= List of township-level divisions of Shaanxi =

Location of Shaanxi province in China

This is a list of township-level divisions of the province of Shaanxi, People's Republic of China. After province, prefecture, and county-level divisions, township-level divisions constitute the formal fourth-level administrative divisions of the PRC. This list is divided first into the prefecture-level then the county-level divisions. The ten prefecture-level divisions of Shaanxi are subdivided into 107 county-level divisions (28 districts, 3 county-level cities, and 76 counties). Those are in turn divided into 1785 township-level divisions: 917 towns (simplified Chinese: 镇; traditional Chinese: 鎮; pinyin: Zhèn), 680 townships (simplified Chinese: 乡; traditional Chinese: 鄉; pinyin: Xiāng), 98 ethnic townships (simplified Chinese: 民族乡; traditional Chinese: 民族鄉; pinyin: Mínzú Xiāng), and 148 subdistricts (Chinese: 街道; pinyin: Jiēdào).

== Xi'an ==
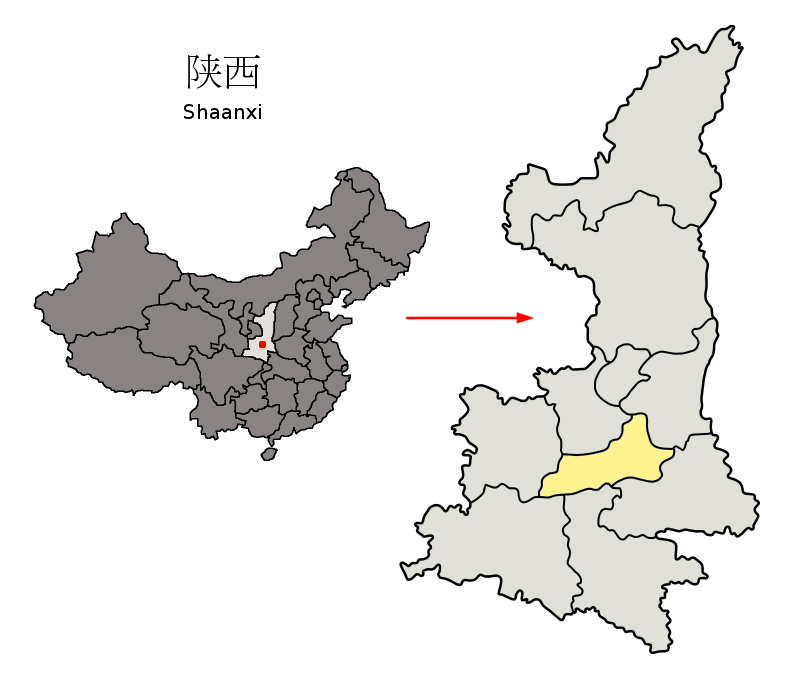
Location of Xi'an within Shaanxi

Xi'an is divided into eleven districts and two counties.

=== Baqiao District ===
Baqiao District has nine subdistricts.

Its subdistricts are Fangzhicheng Subdistrict, Shilipu Subdistrict, Hongqi Subdistrict, Xiwang Subdistrict, Hongqing Subdistrict, Dizhai Subdistrict, Baqiao Subdistrict, Xinzhu Subdistrict, and Xinhe Subdistrict.

=== Beilin District ===
Beilin District has eight subdistricts.

Its subdistricts are Nanyuanmen Subdistrict, Baishulin Subdistrict, Changlefang Subdistrict, Dongguannan Street Subdistrict, Taiyi Road Subdistrict, Wenyi Road Subdistrict, Chang'an Road Subdistrict, and Zhangjiacun Subdistrict.

=== Chang'an District ===
Chang'an District has twenty-five subdistricts.

Its subdistricts are Weiqu Subdistrict, Guodu Subdistrict, Luanzhen Subdistrict, Yinzhen Subdistrict, Wangsi Subdistrict, Mawang Subdistrict, Taiyigong Subdistrict, Dongda Subdistrict, Ziwu Subdistrict, Doumen Subdistrict, Xiliu Subdistrict, Duqu Subdistrict, Dazhao Subdistrict, Huangliang Subdistrict, Xinglong Subdistrict, Wangqu Subdistrict, Mingdu Subdistrict, Wangmang Subdistrict, Wutai Subdistrict, Gaoqiao Subdistrict, Wuxing Subdistrict, Lingzhao Subdistrict, Yangzhuang Subdistrict, Paoli Subdistrict, and Weizhai Subdistrict.

=== Gaoling District ===
Gaoling District has seven subdistricts.

Its subdistricts are Luyuan Subdistrict, Jingwei Subdistrict, Xi'an, Chonghuang Subdistrict, Jijia Subdistrict, Gengzhen Subdistrict, Zhangbo Subdistrict, and Tongyuan Subdistrict.

=== Huyi District ===
Huyi District has eight subdistricts and six towns.

Its subdistricts are Ganting Subdistrict, Yuxia Subdistrict, Yuchan Subdistrict, Wuzhu Subdistrict, Dawang Subdistrict, Qindu Subdistrict, Caotang Subdistrict, and Pangguang Subdistrict.

Its towns are Zu'an, Jiangcun, Laodian, Ganhe, Shijing, and Weifeng.

=== Lantian County ===
Lantian County has one subdistrict and eighteen towns.

Its sole subdistrict is Languan Subdistrict.

Its eighteen towns are Xiehu, Huaxu, Qianwei, Tangyu, Jiaodai, Yushan, Sanli, Puhua, Gepai, Bayuan, Jiujianfang, Lanqiao, Wangchuan, Hou, Sanguanmiao, Ancun, Mengcun, and Xiaozhai.

=== Lianhu District ===
Lianhu District has nine subdistricts.

Its subdistricts are Qingnian Road Subdistrict, Beiyuanmen Subdistrict, Beiguan Subdistrict, Hongmiaopo Subdistrict, Huanchengxi Road Subdistrict, Xiguan Subdistrict, Tumen Subdistrict, Taoyuan Road Subdistrict, and Zaoyuan Subdistrict.

Lianhu District has the following subdistricts.

=== Lintong District ===
Lintong District has twenty-three subdistricts.

Its subdistricts are Lishan Subdistrict, Qingling Subdistrict, Xinfeng Subdistrict, Daiwang Subdistrict, Xiekou Subdistrict, Xingzhe Subdistrict, Lingkou Subdistrict, Xiangqiao Subdistrict, Yujin Subdistrict, Xinshi Subdistrict, Xuyang Subdistrict, Xiquan Subdistrict, Liyang Subdistrict, Ma'e Subdistrict, Hezhai Subdistrict, Jiaokou Subdistrict, Youhuai Subdistrict, Beitian Subdistrict, Tielu Subdistrict, Renliu Subdistrict, Muzhai Subdistrict, Xiaojin Subdistrict, and Renzong Subdistrict.

=== Weiyang District ===
Weiyang District has twelve subdistricts.

Its subdistricts are Zhangjiabao Subdistrict, Sanqiao Subdistrict, Xinjiamiao Subdistrict, Xujiawan Subdistrict, Daminggong Subdistrict, Tanjia Subdistrict, Caotan Subdistrict, Liucunbao Subdistrict, Weiyanggong Subdistrict, Hancheng Subdistrict, Weiyanghu Subdistrict, and Jianzhanglu Subdistrict.

=== Xincheng District ===
Xincheng District has nine subdistricts.

Its subdistricts are Xiyi Road Subdistrict, Changlezhong Road Subdistrict, Zhongshanmen Subdistrict, Hansenzhai Subdistrict, Jiefangmen Subdistrict, Ziqiang Road Subdistrict, Taihua Road Subdistrict, Changlexi Road Subdistrict, and Hujiamiao Subdistrict.

=== Yanliang District ===
Yanliang District has seven subdistricts.

Its subdistricts are Fenghuang Road Subdistrict, Xinhua Road Subdistrict, Zhenxing Subdistrict, Xinxing Subdistrict, Beitun Subdistrict, Wutun Subdistrict, and Guanshan Subdistrict.

=== Yanta District ===
Yanta District has ten subdistricts.

Its subdistricts are Xiaozhai Road Subdistrict, Dayanta Subdistrict, Changyanbao Subdistrict, Dianzicheng Subdistrict, Dengjiapo Subdistrict, Yuhuazhai Subdistrict, Zhangbagou Subdistrict, Qujiang Subdistrict, Ducheng Subdistrict, and Zhangyuzhai Subdistrict.

=== Zhouzhi County ===
Zhouzhi County has one subdistrict and nineteen towns.

Its sole subdistrict is Erqu Subdistrict.

Its towns are Yabai, Zhongnan, Mazhao, Jixian, Louguan, Shangcun, Guangji, Houzhenzi, Qinghua, Zhuyu, Cuifeng, Situn, Sizhu, Jiufeng, Furen, Luoyu, Chenhe, Banfangzi, and Wangjiahe.

== Tongchuan ==
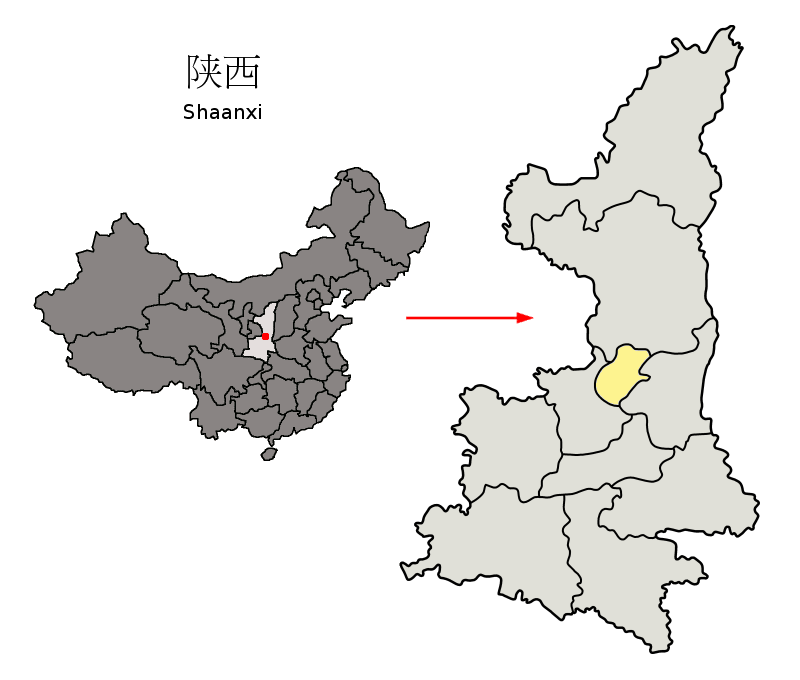
Location of Tongchuan within Shaanxi

Tongchuan is divided into three districts and one county.

=== Wangyi District ===
Wangyi District has six subdistricts and one town.

Its subdistricts are Qiyi Road Subdistrict, Hongqi Street Subdistrict, Taoyuan Subdistrict, Qingnian Road Subdistrict, Wangjiahe Subdistrict, and Wangyi Subdistrict.

Its sole town is Huangbao.

=== Yaozhou District ===
Yaozhou District has six subdistricts and eight towns.

Its subdistricts are Yong'an Road Subdistrict, Tianbao Road Subdistrict, Xianfeng Road Subdistrict, Zhengyang Road Subdistrict, Jinyang Road Subdistrict, and Potou Subdistrict.

Its towns are Dongjiahe, Miaowan, Yaoqu, Zhaojin, Xiaoqiu, Sunyuan, Guanzhuang, and Shizhu.

=== Yijun County ===
Yijun County has one subdistrict, six towns, and one township.

Its sole subdistrict is Yiyang Subdistrict.

Its towns are Peng, Wuli, Tai'an, Qipan, Yaosheng, and Kuquan.

Its sole township is Yunmeng Township.

=== Yintai District ===
Yintai District has four subdistricts and five towns.

Its subdistricts are Chengguan Subdistrict, Sanlidong Subdistrict, Wangshi'ao Subdistrict, and Yintai Subdistrict.

Its towns are Chenlu, Hongtu, Guangyang, Jinsuoguan, and Azhuang.

== Baoji ==
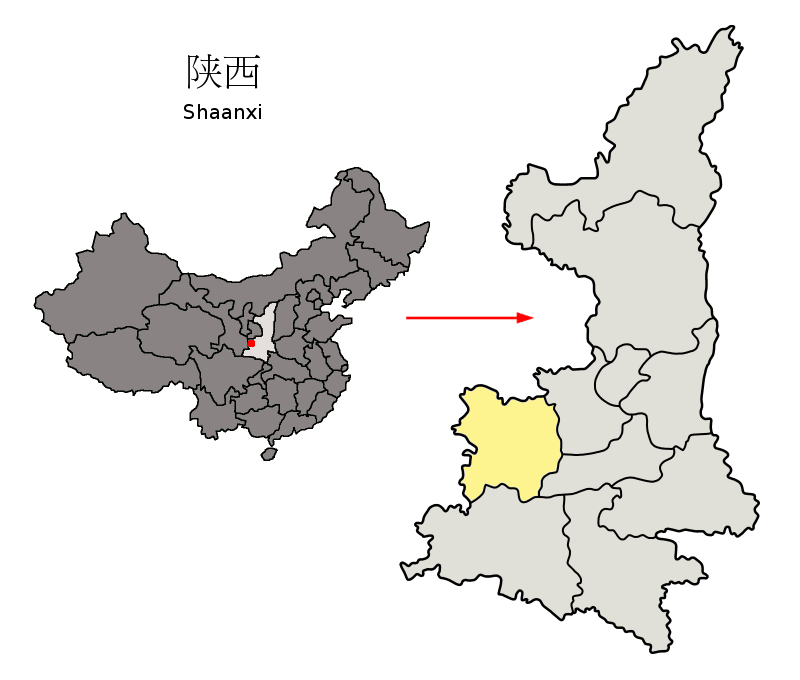
Location of Baoji within Shaanxi

Baoji is divided into three districts and nine counties.

=== Chencang District ===
Chencang District has three subdistricts and fifteen towns.

Its subdistricts are Guozhen Subdistrict, Dongguan Subdistrict, and Qianwei Subdistrict.

Its towns are Yangping, Qianhe, Panxi, Tianwang, Muyi, Zhouyuan, Jiacun, Xiangong, Xinjie, Pingtou, Xiangquan, Chisha, Tuoshi, Fenggeling, and Diaowei.

=== Feng County ===
Feng County has nine towns.

Its towns are Shuangshipu, Fengzhou, Huangniupu, Honghuapu, Hekou, Tangzang, Pingmu, Pingkan, and Liufengguan.

=== Fengxiang County ===
Fengxiang County has twelve towns.

Its towns are Chengguan, Guowang, Biaojiao, Hengshui, Tianjiazhuang, Miganqiao, Nanzhihui, Chencun, Changqing, Liulin, Yaojiagou, and Fanjiazhai.

=== Fufeng County ===
Fufeng County has one subdistrict and seven towns.

Its sole subdistrict is Chengguan Subdistrict.

Its towns are Tiandu, Wujing, Jiangzhang, Duanjia, Xinglin, Shaogong, and Famen.

=== Jintai District ===
Jintai District has seven subdistricts and four towns.

Its subdistricts are Zhongshan East Road Subdistrict, Xiguan Subdistrict, Zhongshan West Road Subdistrict, Qunzhong Road Subdistrict, Dongfeng Road Subdistrict, Shilipu Subdistrict, and Wolongsi Subdistrict.

Its towns are Chencang, Panlong, Jinhe, and Xiashi.

=== Linyou County ===
Linyou County has seven towns.

Its towns are Jiuchenggong, Cuimu, Zhaoxian, Liangting, Changfeng, Zhangba, and Jiufang.

=== Long County ===
Long County has ten towns.

Its towns are Chengguan, Dongfeng, Badu, Dongnan, Wenshui, Tiancheng, Caojiawan, Guguan, Hebei, and Xinjichuan.

=== Mei County ===
Mei County has one subdistrict, and seven towns, and two other township-level divisions.

Its sole subdistrict is Shoushan Subdistrict.

Its towns are Hengqu, Huaiya, Tangyu, Changxing, Jinqu, Yingtou, and Qi.

Its other township-level divisions are Shaanxi Mount Taibai Scenic Area and Honghegu Forest Park.

=== Qianyang County ===
Qianyang County has seven towns.

Its towns are Chengguan, Cuijiatou, Nanzhai, Zhangjiayuan, Shuigou, Caobi, and Gaoya.

=== Qishan County ===
Qishan County has nine towns.

Its towns are Fengming, Caijiapo, Yijian, Pucun, Qinghua, Zaolin, Yongchuan, Gujun, and Jingdang.

=== Taibai County ===
Taibai County has seven towns.

Its towns are Zuitou, Taochuan, Yingge, Jingkou, Taibaihe, Huangboyuan, and Wangjialeng.

=== Weibin District ===
Weibin District has five subdistricts and five towns.

Its subdistricts are Jinling Subdistrict, Jing'er Road Subdistrict, Qingjiang Subdistrict, Jiangtan Subdistrict, and Qiaonan Subdistrict.

Its towns are Maying, Shigu, Shennong, Gaojia, and Bayu.

== Xianyang ==
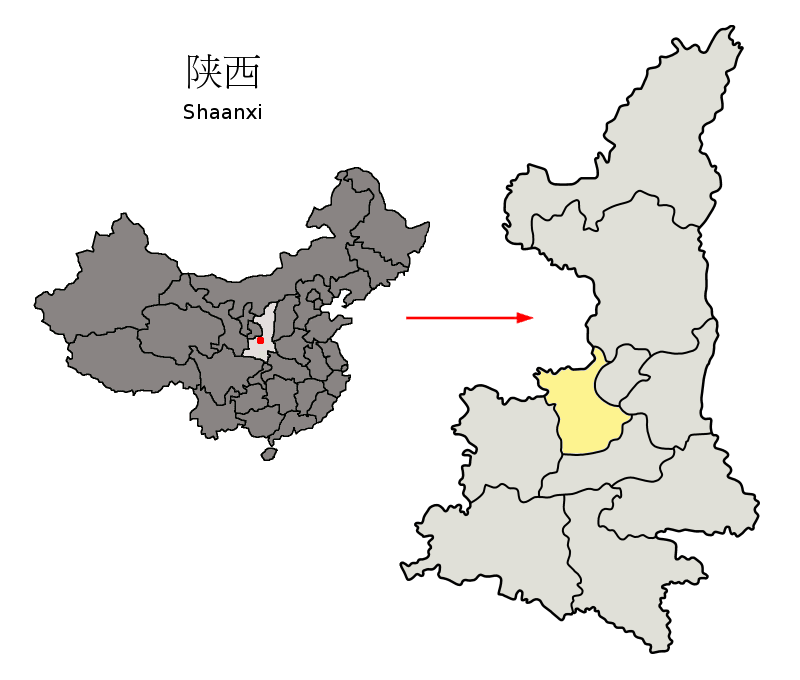
Location of Xianyang within Shaanxi

Xianyang is divided into three districts, nine counties, and two county-level cities.

=== Binzhou ===
Binzhou has two subdistricts and eight towns.

Its subdistricts are Chengguan Subdistrict and Binfeng Subdistrict.

Its towns are Beiji, Xinming, Longgao, Yongle, Yimen, Shuikou, Hanjia, and Taiyu.

=== Changwu County ===
Changwu County has one subdistrict and seven towns.

Its sole subdistrict is Zhaoren Subdistrict.

Its towns are Xianggong, Jujia, Dingjia, Hongjia, Tingkou, Penggong, and Zaoyuan.

=== Chunhua County ===
Chunhua County has one subdistrict and seven towns.

Its sole subdistrict is Chengguan Subdistrict.

Its towns are Guanzhuang, Fangli, Run, Chewu, Tiewang, Shiqiao, and Shiliyuan.

=== Jingyang County ===
Jingyang County has one subdistrict and twelve towns.

Its sole subdistrict is Jinggan Subdistrict.

Its towns are Yongle, Yunyang, Qiaodi, Wangqiao, Kou, Sanqu, Gaozhuang, Taiping, Chongwen, Anwu, Xinglong, and Zhongzhang.

=== Liquan County ===
Liquan County has one subdistrict and eleven towns.

Its sole subdistrict is Chengguan Subdistrict.

Its towns are Shide, Xizhangbao, Qiandong, Fenghuo, Yanxia, Zhao, Chigan, Nanfang, Shitan, Zhaoling, and Junma.

=== Qian County ===
Qian County has one subdistrict and fifteen towns.

Its sole subdistrict is Chengguan Subdistrict.

Its towns are Xuelu, Liangcun, Linping, Jiangcun, Wangcun, Malian, Yangyu, Fengyang, Zhugan, Lingyuan, Yanghong, Liangshan, Zhoucheng, Xinyang, and Dayang.

=== Qindu District ===
Qindu District has twelve subdistricts.

Its subdistricts are Renmin Road Subdistrict, Xilan Road Subdistrict, Wujiabao Subdistrict, Weiyang West Road Subdistrict, Chenyangzhai Subdistrict, Gudu Subdistrict, Shanglin Subdistrict, Diaotai Subdistrict, Maquan Subdistrict, Weibin Subdistrict, Shuangzhao Subdistrict, and Mazhuang Subdistrict.

=== Sanyuan County ===
Sanyuan County has one subdistrict and nine towns.

Its sole subdistrict is Chengguan Subdistrict.

Its towns are Pixi, Duli, Dacheng, Xiyang, Luqiao, Lingqian, Xinxing, Cuo'e, and Qu'an.

=== Weicheng District ===
Weicheng District has ten subdistricts.

Its subdistricts are Zhongshan Subdistrict, Wenhui Road Subdistrict, Xinxing Subdistrict, Weiyang Subdistrict, Weicheng Subdistrict, Yaodian Subdistrict, Zhengyang Subdistrict, Zhouling Subdistrict, Dizhang Subdistrict, and Beidu Subdistrict.

=== Xunyi County ===
Xunyi County has one subdistrict and nine towns.

Its sole subdistrict is Chengguan Subdistrict.

Its towns are Tuqiao, Zhitian, Zhanghong, Taicun, Zhengjia, Qiupotou, Dimiao, Malan, and Qingyuan.

=== Yangling District ===
Yangling District has three subdistricts and two towns.

Its subdistricts are Yangling Subdistrict, Litai Subdistrict, and Dazhai Subdistrict.

Its towns are Wuquan and Rougu.

=== Yongshou County ===
Yongshou County has one subdistrict and six towns.

Its sole subdistrict is Jianjun Subdistrict.

Its towns are Diantou, Changning, Ganjing, Mafang, Quzi, and Yongping.

=== Wugong (武功县) ===
Town 镇

- Puji (普集镇), Sufang (苏坊镇), Wugong (武功镇), Youfeng (游风镇), Zhenyuan (贞元镇), Changning (长宁镇), Xiaocun (小村镇), Dazhuang (大庄镇)

=== Xingping (兴平市) ===
Subdistrict 街道

- Dongcheng Subdistrict (东城街道), Western City Subdistrict (西城街道), Dianzhang Subdistrict (店张街道), Xiwu Subdistrict (西吴街道), Mawei Subdistrict (马嵬街道)

Town 镇

- Zhaocun (赵村镇), Nanshi (南市镇), Zhuangtou (庄头镇), Nanwei (南位镇), Fuzhai (阜寨镇), Fengyi (丰仪镇), Tangfang (汤坊镇)

== Weinan(渭南) ==
=== Linwei (临渭区) ===
Subdistrict 街道

- Duqiao Subdistrict (杜桥街道), Renming Subdistrict (人民街道), Jiefang Subdistrict (解放街道), Xiangyang Subdistrict (向阳街道), Zhannan Subdistrict (站南街道), Shuangwang Subdistrict (双王街道), Liangtian Subdistrict (良田街道), Chongye Subdistrict (崇业路街道)

Town镇

- Qiaonan (桥南镇), Yangguo (阳郭镇), Gushi (故市镇), Xiagui (下邽镇), Sanzhang (三张镇), Jiaoxie (交斜镇), Xinshi (辛市镇), Chongning (崇宁镇), Xiaoyi (孝义镇), Lingdian (吝店镇), Guandi (官底镇), Guanlu (官路镇), Fengyuan (丰原镇), Yancun (阎村镇), Longbei (龙背镇), Guandao (官道镇),

=== Hua (华州区) ===
Town 镇

- Huazhou (华州镇), Xinling (杏林镇), Sushui (赤水镇), Gaotang (高塘镇), Daming (大明镇), Guapo (瓜坡镇), Lianhuasi (莲花寺镇) Liuzhi (柳枝镇) Xiamiao (下庙镇), Jindui (金堆镇)

=== Tongguan (潼关县) ===
Town镇

- Chengguan (城关镇), Qingdong (秦东镇), Taiyao (太要镇), Tongyu (桐峪镇), Daiziying (代字营镇)

Township乡

- Anle (安乐乡)

=== Dali (大荔县) ===
Town 镇

- Chengguan (城关镇), Xuzhuang (许庄镇), Chaoyi (朝邑镇), Anren (安仁镇), Liangyi (两宜镇), Qiangbai (羌白镇), Guanchi (官池镇), Fengcun (冯村镇), Shaungquan (双泉镇), Gaoming (高明镇), Xiazhai (下寨镇), Weilin (韦林镇), Fanjia (范家镇), Sucun (苏村镇), Zhaodu (赵渡镇), Pingming (平民镇), Nianqiao (埝桥镇), Duanjia (段家镇)

Others which be similar township unit.(类似乡级单位)

- State-owned Shaanxi Libei Enterprise Company (国营陕西荔北企业公司), State-owned Shaanxi Shayuan Enterprise Company (国营陕西沙苑企业公司), State-owned Shaanxi Yellow River Enterprise Company (国营陕西黄河企业公司)

=== Heyang (合阳县) ===
Town 镇

- Chengguan (城关镇), Ganjing (甘井镇), Fang (坊镇), Qiachuan (洽川镇), Xinchi (新池镇), Heichi (黑池镇), Lujing (路井镇), Hejiazhuang (和家庄镇), Wangcun (王村镇), Tongjiazhuang (同家庄镇), Bailiang (百良镇), Jinyu (金峪镇)

=== Chengcheng ===
Subdistricts:

- Chengguan Sudistrict (城关街道)

Towns:

- Fengyuan (冯原镇), Wangzhuang (王庄镇), Yaotou (尧头镇), Zhaozhuang (赵庄镇), Jiaodao (交道镇), Siqian (寺前镇), Weizhuang (韦庄镇), Anli (安里镇), Zhuangtou (庄头镇)

=== Pucheng ===
Subdistricts:

- Fengxian Subdistrict (奉先街道), Zijing Subdistrict (紫荆街道)

Towns:

- Hanjing (罕井镇), Sun (孙镇), Xing (兴镇), Dangmu (党睦镇), Gaoyang (高阳镇), Yongfeng (永丰镇), Jingyao (荆姚镇), Sufang (苏坊镇), Longyang (龙阳镇), Luobin (洛滨镇), Chenzhuang (陈庄镇), Qiaoling (桥陵镇), Yaoshan (尧山镇), Chunlin (椿林镇), Longchi (龙池镇)

=== Baishui ===
Subdistricts:

- Chengguan Subdistrict (城关街道)

Towns:

- Yaohe (尧禾镇), Dukang (杜康镇), Xigu (西固镇), Lingao (林皋镇), Shiguan (史官镇), Beiyuan (北塬镇), Leiya (雷牙镇)

=== Fuping ===
Subdistricts:

- Chengguan Subdistrict (城关街道)

Towns:

- Zhuangli (庄里镇), Zhangqiao (张桥镇), Meiyuan (美原镇), Liuqu (流曲镇), Dancun (淡村镇), Liugu (留古镇), Laomiao (老庙镇), Xue (薛镇), Daoxian (到贤镇), Caocun (曹村镇), Gongli (宫里镇), Meijiaping (梅家坪镇), Liuji (刘集镇), Qicun (齐村镇)

=== Hancheng ===
Subdistricts:

- Xincheng Subdistrict (新城街道), Jincheng Subdistrict (金城街道

Towns:

- Longmen (龙门镇), Sangshuping (桑树坪镇), Zhichuan (芝川镇), Xizhuang (西庄镇), Zhiyang (芝阳镇), Banqiao (板桥镇)

=== Huayin ===
Subdistricts:

- Taihualu Subdistrict (太华路街道), Yuemiao Subdistrict (岳庙街道

Towns:

- Mengyuan (孟塬镇), Huaxi (华西镇), Luofu (罗敷镇), Huashan (华山镇)

Others:

- State-owned Shaanxi Huashan Enterprise Companyown (国营陕西华山企业公司)

== Yan'an ==
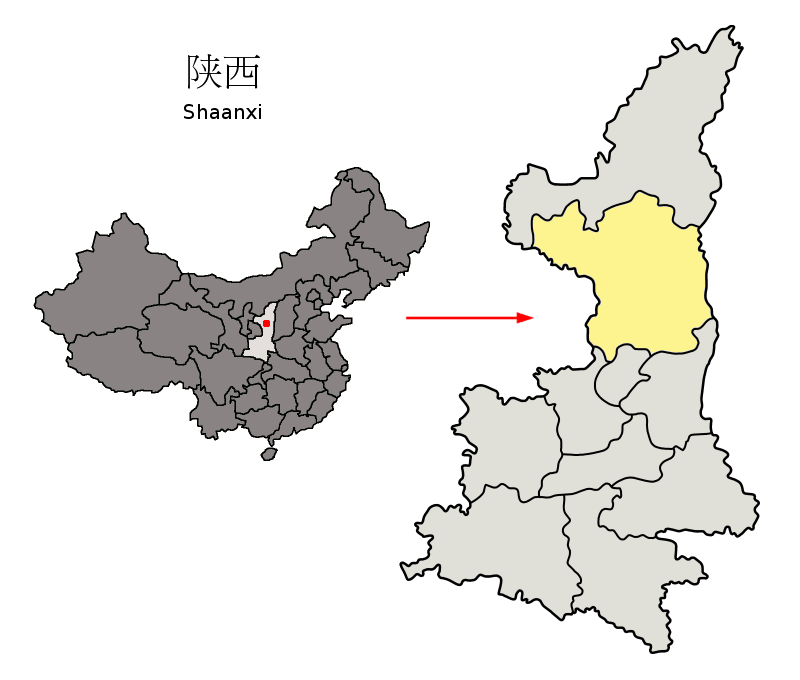
Location of Yan'an within Shaanxi

Yan'an is divided into two districts, ten counties, and one county-level city.

=== Ansai District ===
Ansai District has three subdistricts and eight towns.

Its subdistricts are Zhenwudong Subdistrict, Jinming Subdistrict, and Baiping Subdistrict.

Its towns are Zhuanyaowan, Yanhewan, Zhao'an, Huaziping, Pingqiao, Jianhua, Gaoqiao, and Liandaowan.

=== Baota District ===
Baota District has five subdistricts, twelve towns, and one township.

Its subdistricts are Baotashan Subdistrict, Nanshi Subdistrict, Fenghuangshan Subdistrict, Zaoyuan Subdistrict, and Qiaogou Subdistrict.

Its towns are Hezhuangping, Liqu, Yaodian, Qinghuabian, Panlong, Liulin, Nanniwan, Lin, Ganguyi, Wanghuashan, Chuankou, and Madongchuan.

Its sole township is Fengzhuang Township.

=== Fu County ===
Fu County has one subdistrict, six towns, and one township.

Its sole subdistrict is Chafang Subdistrict.

Its six towns are Zhangcunyi, Zhangjiawan, Zhiluo, Niuwu, Sixian, and Yangquan.

Its sole township is Beidaode Township.

=== Ganquan County ===
Ganquan County has one subdistrict, three towns, and two townships.

Its sole subdistrict is Meishui Subdistrict.

Its three towns are Xiasiwan, Dao, and Shimen.

Its two townships are Qiaozhen Township and Laoshan Township.

=== Huangling County ===
Huangling County has one subdistrict and five towns.

Its sole subdistrict is Qiaoshan Subdistrict.

Its five towns are Diantou, Longfang, Tianzhuang, Adang, and Shuanglong.

=== Huanglong County ===
Huanglong County has five towns and two townships.

Its five towns are Shibao, Baimatan, Wazijie, Jietoumiao, and Sancha.

Its two townships are Getai Township and Yaoxian Township.

=== Luochuan County ===
Luochuan County has one subdistrict and eight towns.

Its sole subdistrict is Fengqi Subdistrict.

Its eight towns are Jiuxian, Jiaokouhe, Laomiao, Tuji, Shitou, Huaibai, Yongxiang, and Pudi.

=== Wuqi County ===
Wuqi County has one subdistrict and eight towns.

Its sole subdistrict is Wuqi Subdistrict.

Its eight towns are Tiebiancheng, Zhouwan, Baibao, Zhangguanmiao, Changcheng, Wugucheng, Wucangbao, and Miaogou.

=== Yanchang County ===
Yanchang County has one subdistrict and seven towns.

Its sole subdistrict is Qilucun Subdistrict.

Its seven towns are Heijiabao, Zhengzhuang, Zhangjiatan, Jiaokou, Luozishan, Leichi, and Angou.

=== Yanchuan County ===
Yanchuan County has one subdistrict and seven towns.

Its sole subdistrict is Dayu Subdistrict, Yanchuan County.

Its seven towns are Yongping, Yanshuiguan, Wen'anyi, Yangjiagetai, Jiajiaping, Guanzhuang, and Qiankunwan.

=== Yichuan County ===
Yichuan County has one subdistrict, four towns, and two townships.

Its sole subdistrict is Danzhou Subdistrict.

Its four towns are Qiulin, Yunyan, Jiyi, and Hukou.

Its two townships are Yingwang Township and Jiaoli Township.

=== Zhidan County ===
Zhidan County has one subdistrict and seven towns.

Its sole subdistrict is Bao'an Subdistrict.

Its seven towns are Danba, Jinding, Yongning, Xinghe, Shunning, Yizheng, and Shuanghe.

=== Zichang ===
Zichang has one subdistrict and eight towns.

Its sole subdistrict is Wayaobu Subdistrict.

Its eight towns are Yangjiayuanze, Yujiawan, Anding, Majiabian, Nangoucha, Jianyucha, Lijiacha, and Yujiaping.

== Hanzhong (汉中) ==
=== Hantai ===
Subdistricts:

- Beiguan Subdistrict (北关街道), Dongdajie Subdistrict (东大街街道), Hanzhonglu Subdistrict (汉中路街道), Zhongshanjie Subdistrict (中山街街道), Dongguan Subdistrict (东关街道), Xinyuan Subdistrict (鑫源街道), Qili Subdistrict (七里街道), Longjiang Subdistrict (龙江街道)

Towns:

- Pu (铺镇), Wuxiang (武乡镇), Hedongdian (河东店镇), Zongying (宗营镇), Laojun (老君镇), Hanwang (汉王镇), Xuwang (徐望镇)

=== Nanzheng ===
Subdistricts:

- Hanshan Subdistrict (汉山街道), Zhongsuoying Subdistrict (中所营街道)

Towns:

- Shengshui (圣水镇), Dahekan (大河坎镇), Xieshui (协税镇), Liangshan (梁山镇), Yangchun (阳春镇), Gaotai (高台镇), Xinji (新集镇), Lianshui (濂水镇), Huangguan (黄官镇), Qingshu (青树镇), Hongmiao (红庙镇), Moujiaba (牟家坝镇), Fa (法镇), Xiangshui (湘水镇), Xiaonanhai (小南海镇), Beiba (碑坝镇), Liping (黎坪镇), Fucheng (福成镇), Lianghe (两河镇), Hujiaying (胡家营镇)

=== Chenggu ===
Subdistricts:

- Bowang Subdistrict (博望街道), Lianhua Subdistrict (莲花街道)

Towns:

- Longtou (龙头镇), Shaheying (沙河营镇), Wenchuan (文川镇), Liulin (柳林镇), Laozhuang (老庄镇), Juyuan (桔园镇), Yuangong (原公镇), Shangyuanguan (上元观镇), Tianming (天明镇), Erli (二里镇), Wudu (五堵镇), Shuangxi (双溪镇), Xiaohe (小河镇), Dongjiaying (董家营镇), Sanhe (三合镇)

Others:

- Shaanxi Aircraft Manufacturing Company (陕西飞机制造公司)

=== Yang ===
Subdistricts:

- Yangzhou Subdistrict (洋州街道), Zhifang Subdistrict (纸坊街道), Qishi Subdistrict (戚氏街道)

Towns:

- Longting (龙亭镇), Xiecun (谢村镇), Machang (马畅镇), Yishui (溢水镇), Moziqiao (磨子桥镇), Huangjiaying (黄家营镇), Huang'an (黄安镇), Huangjin (黄金峡镇), Huaishuguan (槐树关镇), Jinshui (金水镇), Huayang (华阳镇), Maoping (茅坪镇), Baliguan (八里关镇), Sangxi (桑溪镇), Guandi (关帝镇)

=== Xixiang ===
Subdistricts:

- Chengbei Subdistrict (城北街道), Chengnan Subdistrict (城南街道)

Towns:

- Yanghe (杨河镇), Liushu (柳树镇), Shahe (沙河镇), Sidu (私渡镇), Sangyuan (桑园镇), Bailongtang (白龙塘镇), Xiakou (峡口镇), Yankou (堰口镇), Cha (茶镇), Gaochuan (高川镇), Lianghekou (两河口镇), Dahe (大河镇), Luojiaba (骆家坝镇), Ziwu (子午镇), Baimianxia (白勉峡镇)

=== Mian ===
Subdistricts:

- Mianyang Subdistrict (勉阳街道)

Towns:

- Wuhou (武侯镇), Zhoujiashan (周家山镇), Tonggousi (同沟寺镇), Xinjiezi (新街子镇), Laodaosi (老道寺镇), Baocheng (褒城镇), Jinquan (金泉镇), Dingjunshan (定军山镇), Wenquan (温泉镇), Yuandun (元墩镇), Fuchuan (阜川镇), Xinpu (新铺镇镇), Chadian (茶店镇), Zhenchuan (镇川镇), Chisuba (漆树坝镇), Zhangjiahe (张家河镇), Changgouhe (长沟河镇)

=== Ningqiang ===
Subdistricts:

- Hanyuan Subdistrict (汉源街道), Gaozhaizi Subdistrict (高寨子街道)

Towns:

- Da'an (大安镇), Daijiaba (代家坝镇), Yangpingguan (阳平关镇), Yanzibian (燕子砭镇), Guangping (广坪镇), Qingmuchuan (青木川镇), Maobahe (毛坝河镇), Tiesuoguan (铁锁关镇), Hujiaba (胡家坝镇), Bashan (巴山镇), Juting (巨亭镇), Shujiaba (舒家坝镇), Taiyangling (太阳岭镇), Anlehe (安乐河镇), Erlangba (二郎坝镇), Chanjiayan (禅家岩镇)

=== Lueyang ===
Subdistricts:

- Xingzhou Subdistrict (兴州街道), Hengxianhe Subdistrict (横现河街道)

Towns:

- Jieguanting (接官亭镇), Xihuaiba (西淮坝镇), Lianghekou (两河口镇), Jinjiahe (金家河镇), Xujiaping (徐家坪镇), Baishuijiang (白水江镇), Xiakouyi (硖口驿镇), Matiwan (马蹄湾镇), Lesuhe (乐素河镇), Guo (郭镇), Heihe (黑河镇), Baiquesi (白雀寺镇), Sendaiba (仙台坝镇), Wulongdong (五龙洞镇), Guanyin (观音寺镇)

=== Zhenba ===
Subdistricts:

- Jingyang Subdistrict (泾洋街道)

Towns:

- Yudu (渔渡镇), Yanchang (盐场镇), Guanyin (观音镇), Bamiao (巴庙镇), Xinglong (兴隆镇), Changling (长岭镇), Sanyuan (三元镇), Jianchi (简池镇), Nianzi (碾子镇), Xiaoyang (小洋镇), Qingshui (青水镇), Chinan (赤南镇), Pingan (平安镇), Yangjiahe (杨家河镇), Bashan (巴山镇), Liba (黎坝镇), Rencun (仁村镇), Dachi (大池镇), Yongle (永乐镇)

=== Liuba ===
Subdistricts:

- Zibai Subdistrict (紫柏街道)

Towns:

- Madao (马道镇), Wuguanyi (武关驿镇), Liuhou (留侯镇), Jiangkou (江口镇), Yuhuangmiao (玉皇庙镇), Huoshaodian (火烧店镇), Qingqiaoyi (青桥驿镇)

=== Foping ===
Subdistricts:

- Yuanjiazhuang Subdistrict (袁家庄街道)

Towns:

- Chenjiaba (陈家坝镇), Daheba (大河坝镇), Xichahe (西岔河镇), Yueba (岳坝镇), Changjiaoba (长角坝镇), Shidunhe (石墩河镇)

== Yulin (榆林) ==
=== Yuyang ===
Subdistricts:

- Gulou Subdistrict (鼓楼街道), Qingshanlu Subdistrict (青山路街道), Shangjunlu Subdistrict (上郡路街道), Xinminglou Subdistrict (新明楼街道), Tuofenglu Subdistrict (驼峰路街道), Chongwenlu Subdistrict (崇文路街道), Hangyulu Subdistrict (航宇路街道), Changchenglu Subdistrict (长城路街道), Jinshalu Subdistrict (金沙路街道), Chaoyanglu Subdistrict (朝阳路街道), Shahelu Subdistrict (沙河路街道), Mingzhulu Subdistrict (明珠路街道)

Towns:

- Yuhe (鱼河镇), Shangyanwan (上盐湾镇), Zhenchuan (镇川镇), Mahuangliang (麻黄梁镇), Niujialiang (牛家梁镇), Jinjitan (金鸡滩镇), Mahe (马合镇), Balasu (巴拉素镇), Yuhemao (鱼河峁镇), Qingyun (青云镇), Guta (古塔镇), Daheta (大河塔镇), Xiaojihan (小纪汗镇), Qinhe (芹河镇)

Townships:

- Mengjiawan Township (孟家湾乡), Xiaohaotu Township (小壕兔乡), Chaheze Township (岔河则乡), Bulanghe Township (补浪河乡), Hongshiqiao Township (红石桥乡)

=== Shenmu ===
Subdistricts:

- Binhexinqu Subdistrict (滨河新区街道), Xisha Subdistrict (西沙街道), Linzhou Subdistrict (麟州街道), Yingbinlu Subdistrict (迎宾路街道), Yongxing Subdistrict (永兴街道), Xigou Subdistrict (西沟街道)

Towns:

- Gaojiabao (高家堡镇), Dianta (店塔镇), Sunjiacha (孙家岔镇), Daliuta (大柳塔镇), Huashiya (花石崖镇), Zhongji (中鸡镇), Hejiachuan (贺家川镇), Erlintu (尔林兔镇), Wan (万镇), Dabaodang (大保当镇), Ma (马镇), Langanbao (栏杆堡镇), Shamao (沙峁镇), Jinjie (锦界镇)

=== Fugu ===
Towns:

- Fugu (府谷镇), Huangfu (黄甫镇), Ha (哈镇), Miaogoumen (庙沟门镇), Xinmin (新民镇), Gushan (孤山镇), Qingshui (清水镇), Dachanghan (大昌汗镇), Gucheng (古城镇), Sandaogou (三道沟镇), Laogaochuan (老高川镇), Wujiazhuang (武家庄镇), Mugua (木瓜镇), Tianjiazhai (田家寨镇)

=== Hengshan ===
Subdistricts:

- Chengguan Subdistrict (城关街道), Huaiyuan Subdistrict (怀远街道), Xiazhou Subdistrict (夏州街道), Huairenlu Subdistrict (怀仁路街道), Chongdelu Subdistrict (崇德路街道)

Towns:

- Shiwan (石湾镇), Gao (高镇), Wu (武镇), Dangcha (党岔镇), Xiangshui (响水镇), Boluo (波罗镇), Dianshi (殿市镇), Tawan (塔湾镇), Zhaoshipan (赵石畔镇), Weijialou (魏家楼镇), Hancha (韩岔镇), Baijie (白界镇), Leilongwan (雷龙湾镇)

=== Jingbian ===
Subdistricts:

- Zhangjiapan Subdistrict (张家畔街道)

Towns:

- Dongkeng (东坑镇), Qingyangcha (青阳岔镇), Ningtiaoliang (宁条梁镇), Zhouhe (周河镇), Hongdunjie (红墩界镇), Yangqiaopan (杨桥畔镇), Wangquze (王渠则镇), Zhongshanjian (中山涧镇), Yangmijian (杨米涧镇), Tianciwan (天赐湾镇), Xiaohe (小河镇), Longzhou (龙洲镇), Huanghaojie (黄蒿界镇), Haizetan (海则滩镇), Ximawan (席麻湾镇), Zhenjing (镇靖镇)

=== Dingbian ===
Subdistricts:

- Dingbian Subdistrict (定边街道)

Towns:

- Hequan (贺圈镇), Hongliugou (红柳沟镇), Zhuanjing (砖井镇), Bainijing (白泥井镇), Anbian (安边镇), Duiziliang (堆子梁镇), Baiwanzi (白湾子镇), Jiyuan (姬塬镇), Yangjing (杨井镇), Xin'anbian (新安边镇), Zhangweixian (张崾先镇), Fanxue (樊学镇), Yanchangbao (盐场堡镇), Haotan (郝滩镇), Shidonggou (石洞沟镇), Fengdikeng (冯地坑镇)

Townships:

- Youfangzhuang Township(油房庄乡), Xuezhuang Township(学庄乡)

=== Suide ===
Towns:

- Mingzhou (名州镇), Xuejiamao (薛家峁镇), Cuijiawan (崔家湾镇), Dingxianchi (定仙墕镇), Zaolinping (枣林坪镇), Yihe (义合镇), Ji (吉镇), Xuejiahe (薛家河镇), Sishilipu (四十里铺镇), Shijiawan (石家湾镇), Tianzhuang (田庄镇), Zhongjiao (中角镇), Mantangchuan (满堂川镇), Zhangjiayun (张家砭镇), Baijianai (白家硷镇)

=== Mizhi ===
Subdistricts:

- Yinzhou Subdistrict (银州街道)

Towns:

- Tao (桃镇), Long (龙镇), Yangjiagou (杨家沟镇), Dujiashigou (杜家石沟镇), Shajiadian (沙家店镇), Yindou (印斗镇), Guoxingzhuang (郭兴庄镇), Chengjiao (城郊镇)

=== Jia ===
Subdistricts:

- Jiazhou Subdistrict (佳州街道)

Towns:

- Keng (坑镇), Dian (店镇), Wu (乌镇), Jinmingsi (金明寺镇), Tong (通镇), Wangjiayun (王家砭镇), Tangta (方塌镇), Zhujiagua (朱家坬镇), Xi (螅镇), Zhuguanzhai (朱官寨镇), Liuguoju (刘国具镇), Mutouyu (木头峪镇)

=== Wubu ===
Subdistricts:

- Songjiachuan Subdistrict (宋家川街道)

Towns:

- Xinjiagou (辛家沟镇), Guojiagou (郭家沟镇), Koujiayuan (寇家塬镇), Chashang (岔上镇), Zhangjiashan (张家山镇)

=== Qingjian ===
Towns:

- Kuanzhou (宽州镇), Shizuiyi (石咀驿镇), Zhejiaping (折家坪镇), Yujiahe (玉家河镇), Gaojiecun (高杰村镇), Lijiata (李家塔镇), Dianzegou (店则沟镇), Xiejiagou (解家沟镇), Xialianlipu (下廿里铺镇)

=== Zizhou ===
Subdistricts:

- Binhexinqu Subdistrict (双湖峪街道)

Towns:

- Hejiaji (何家集镇), Laojundian (老君殿镇), Peijiawan (裴家湾镇), Miaojiaping (苗家坪镇), Sanchuankou (三川口镇), Matigou (马蹄沟镇), Zhoujiadao (周家硷镇), Dianshi (电市镇), Zhuanmiao (砖庙镇), Huainingwan (淮宁湾镇), Macha (马岔镇)

Townships:

- Tuoerxiang Township(驼耳巷乡)

== Ankang (安康) ==
=== Hanbin ===
Subdistricts:

- Laocheng Subdistrict (老城街道), Xincheng Subdistrict (新城街道), Jiangbei Subdistrict (江北街道), Jianmin Subdistrict (建民街道)

Towns:

- Guanmiao (关庙镇), Zhangtan (张滩镇), Yinghu (瀛湖镇), Wuli (五里镇), Hengkou (恒口镇), Jihe (吉河镇), Liushui (流水镇), Dazhuyuan (大竹园镇), Hongshan (洪山镇), Cigou (茨沟镇), Dahe (大河镇), Shenba (沈坝镇), Shuanglong (双龙镇), Yeping (叶坪镇), Zhongyuan (中原镇), Xianhe (县河镇), Zijing (紫荆镇), Zaoyang (早阳镇), Guanjia (关家镇), Shiti (石梯镇), Bahe (坝河镇), Niutie (牛蹄镇), Yanba (晏坝镇), Tanba (谭坝镇)

=== Hanyin ===
Towns:

- Chengguan (城关镇), Jianchi (涧池镇), Puxi (蒲溪镇), Pingliang (平梁镇), Shuangru (双乳镇), Tiefosi (铁佛寺镇), Xuanwo (漩涡镇), Hanyang (汉阳镇), Shuanghekou (双河口镇), Guanyinhe (观音河镇)

=== Shiquan ===
Towns:

- Chengguan (城关镇), Raofeng (饶峰镇), Lianghe (两河镇), Yingfeng (迎丰镇), Chihe (池河镇), Houliu (后柳镇), Xihe (喜河镇), Yundou (熨斗镇), Yunwushan (云雾山镇), Zhongchi (中池镇), Zengxi (曾溪镇)

=== Ningshan ===
Towns:

- Chengguan (城关镇), Simude (四亩地镇), Jiangkou (江口镇), Guanghuojie (广货街镇), Longwang (龙王镇), Tongchewan (筒车湾镇), Jinchuan (金川镇), Huangguan (皇冠镇), Taishanmiao (太山庙镇), Meizi (梅子镇), Xinchang (新场镇)

=== Ziyang ===
Towns:

- Chengguan (城关镇), Haoping (蒿坪镇), Hanwang (汉王镇), Huangu (焕古镇), Xiangyang (向阳镇), Donghe (洞河镇), Huishui (洄水镇), Shuangqiao (双桥镇), Gaoqiao (高桥镇), Hongchun (红椿镇), Gaotan (高滩镇), Maoba (毛坝镇), Wamiao (瓦庙镇), Maliu (麻柳镇), Shuang'an (双安镇), Dongmu (东木镇), Jieling (界岭镇)

=== Langao ===
Towns:

- Chengguan (城关镇), Zuolong (佐龙镇), Taohe (滔河镇), Guanyuan (官元镇), Shimen (石门镇), Minzhu (民主镇), Dadaohe (大道河镇), Yanmen (堰门镇), Linhe (蔺河镇), Siji (四季镇), Mengshiling (孟石岭镇), Nangongshan (南宫山镇)

=== Pingli ===
Towns:

- Chengguan (城关镇), Xinglong (兴隆镇), Laoxian (老县镇), Dagui (大贵镇), Sanyang (三阳镇), Luohe (洛河镇), Guangfo (广佛镇), Baxian (八仙镇), Chang'an (长安镇), Zhengyang (正阳镇), Xihe (西河镇)

=== Zhenping ===
Towns:

- Chengguan (城关镇), Cengjia (曾家镇), Niutoudian (牛头店镇), Zhongbao (钟宝镇), Shangzhu (上竹镇), Huaping (华坪镇), Shuping (曙坪镇)

=== Xunyang ===
Towns:

- Chengguan (城关镇), Zongxi (棕溪镇), Guankou (关口镇), Shuhe (蜀河镇), Shuanghe (双河镇), Xiaohe (小河镇), Zhaowan (赵湾镇), Maping (麻坪镇), Ganxi (甘溪镇), Bailiu (白柳镇), Luhe (吕河镇), Shenhe (神河镇), Tongqianguan (铜钱关镇), Duanjiahe (段家河镇), Xianhe (仙河镇), Jinzhai (金寨镇), Tongmu (桐木镇), Gouyuan (构元镇), Shimen (石门镇), Hongjun (红军镇), Renhekou (仁河口镇)

=== Baihe ===
Towns:

- Chengguan (城关镇), Zhongchang (中厂镇), Gouba (构扒镇), Kazi (卡子镇), Maoping (茅坪镇), Songjia (宋家镇), Xiying (西营镇), Cangshang (仓上镇), Lengshui (冷水镇), Shuangfeng (双丰镇), Mahu (麻虎镇)

== Shangluo (商洛) ==
=== Shangzhou ===
Subdistricts

- Chengguan Subdistrict (城关街道), Dazhaoyu Subdistrict (大赵峪街道), Chenyuan Subdistrict (陈塬街道), Liuwan Subdistrict (刘湾街道)

Towns

- Yecun (夜村镇), Shahezi (沙河子镇), Yangyuhe (杨峪河镇), Jinlingsi (金陵寺镇), Heishan (黑山镇), Yangxie (杨斜镇), Majie (麻街镇), Muhuguan (牧护关镇), Dajing (大荆镇), Yaoshi (腰市镇), Banqiao (板桥镇), Beikuanping (北宽坪镇), Sanchahe (三岔河镇), Yancun (闫村镇)

Others

- Erlongshan Reservoir(二龙山水库), Nanqin Reservoir(南秦水库), Erlongshan State Forest Farm(二龙山国营林场), Shangdan Circulation Industrial Park(商丹循环工业园), Jinghe Industrial Park(荆河工业园), Jinghe Agricultural Demonstration Park(荆河农业示范园), University Park(高校园区), Shangluo Vocational and Technical College Township(商洛职业技术学院), Silicon Fluoride Industrial Park (氟化硅产业业园)

=== Luonan ===
1 subdistrict

- Chengguan (城关街道)

9 towns

- Maping (麻坪镇), Shimen (石门镇), Shipo (石坡镇), Xunjian (巡检镇), Si′er (寺耳镇), Lingkou (灵口镇), Sanyao (三要镇), Gucheng (古城镇), and Jingcun (景村镇)

=== Danfeng ===
1 subdistrict

- Longjuzhai (龙驹寨街道)

9 townships

- Dihua (棣花镇), Siping (寺坪镇), Tumen (土门镇), Zhulinguan (竹林关镇), Wuguan (武关镇), Tieyupu (铁峪铺镇), Luanzhuang (峦庄镇), Caichuan (蔡川镇), and Yuling (庾岭镇)

=== Shangnan ===
1 subdistrict

- Chengguan (城关街道)

8 towns

- Shiliping (十里坪镇), Qingyouhe (清油河镇), Shima (试马镇), Guofenglou (过风楼镇), Zhaochuan (赵川镇), Xianghe (湘河镇), Fushui (富水镇), and Qingshan (青山镇)

=== Shanyang ===
2 subdistricts

- Chengguan (城关街道), and Shilipu (十里铺街道)

8 towns

- Banyan (板岩镇), Sehepu (色河铺镇), Xiaohekou (小河口镇), Yangdi (杨地镇), Nankuanping (南宽坪镇), Manchuanguan (漫川关镇), Xizhaochuan (西照川镇), and Yinhua (银花镇)

=== Zhen'an ===
8 towns

- Daren (达仁镇), Chaiping (柴坪镇), Qingtongguan (青铜关镇), Gaofeng (高峰镇), Miliang (米粮镇), Daping (大坪镇), Tiechang (铁厂镇), and Huilong (回龙镇)

2 ethnic towns

- Hui Xikou (西口回族镇), and Hui Maoping (茅坪回族镇)

=== Zhashui ===
1 subdistrict

- Qianyou (乾佑街道)

8 towns

- Xingping (杏坪镇), Caoping (曹坪镇), Hongyansi (红岩寺镇), Fenghuang (凤凰镇), Xiaoling (小岭镇), Xialiang (下梁镇), Yingpan (营盘镇), and Wafangkou (瓦房口镇)
