= Xinshi =

Xinshi may refer to the following locations in mainland China and Taiwan:

== Districts ==
- Xinshi District, Baoding, Hebei
- Xinshi District, Ürümqi, Xinjiang

== Subdistricts ==
- Xinshi Subdistrict, Shijiazhuang (新石街道), in Qiaoxi District, Shijiazhuang, Hebei
- Xinshi Subdistrict, Jinhua (新狮街道), in Wucheng District, Jinhua, Zhejiang
- Xinshi Subdistrict, Guangzhou, in Baiyun District
- Xinshi Subdistrict, Linjiang, Jilin
- Xinshi Subdistrict, Xi'an, in Lintong District

== Towns ==
- Xinshi, Anhui, in Bowang District, Ma'anshan, Anhui
- Xinshi, Chongqing, Changshou District, Chongqing
- Xinshi, Zaoyang, Xiangyang, Hubei
- Xinshi, Jingshan County, Jingmen, Hubei
- Xinshi, Leiyang (新市镇), Leiyang City, Hengyang, Hunan.
- Xinshi, You County, Hunan
- Xinshi, Mianzhu, Sichuan
- Xinshi, Ziyang, in Jianyang, Sichuan
- Xinshi, Yibin, in Pingshan County, Sichuan
- Xinshi, Huzhou, in Deqing County, Zhejiang

== Townships ==
- Xinshi Township, Qu County, Sichuan

== See also ==
- Sinshih District, Tainan, Taiwan
- Xinshi 1st Rd light rail station
