= Shennong (disambiguation) =

Shennong was a legendary leader of China.

Shennong may also refer to:

- Shennong, Shaanxi, town in Baoji, Shaanxi, China
- Shennong, Shanxi, town in Gaoping, Shanxi, China
- Shennong Stream, river in Hubei, China
- Shennong Mountain, mountain near Qinyang, Henan, China
- Somatochlora shennong, dragonfly in the family Corduliidae

== See also ==
- Shennong Bencaojing, Chinese agricultural and medicinal text attributed to Shennong
- Shilin Shennong Temple in Shilin District, Taipei, Taiwan
- Emperor Yan, believed to be the same person as Shennong
- Shennongjia in Hubei, China
