= Beilin, Xi'an =

Beilin 碑林区
- District
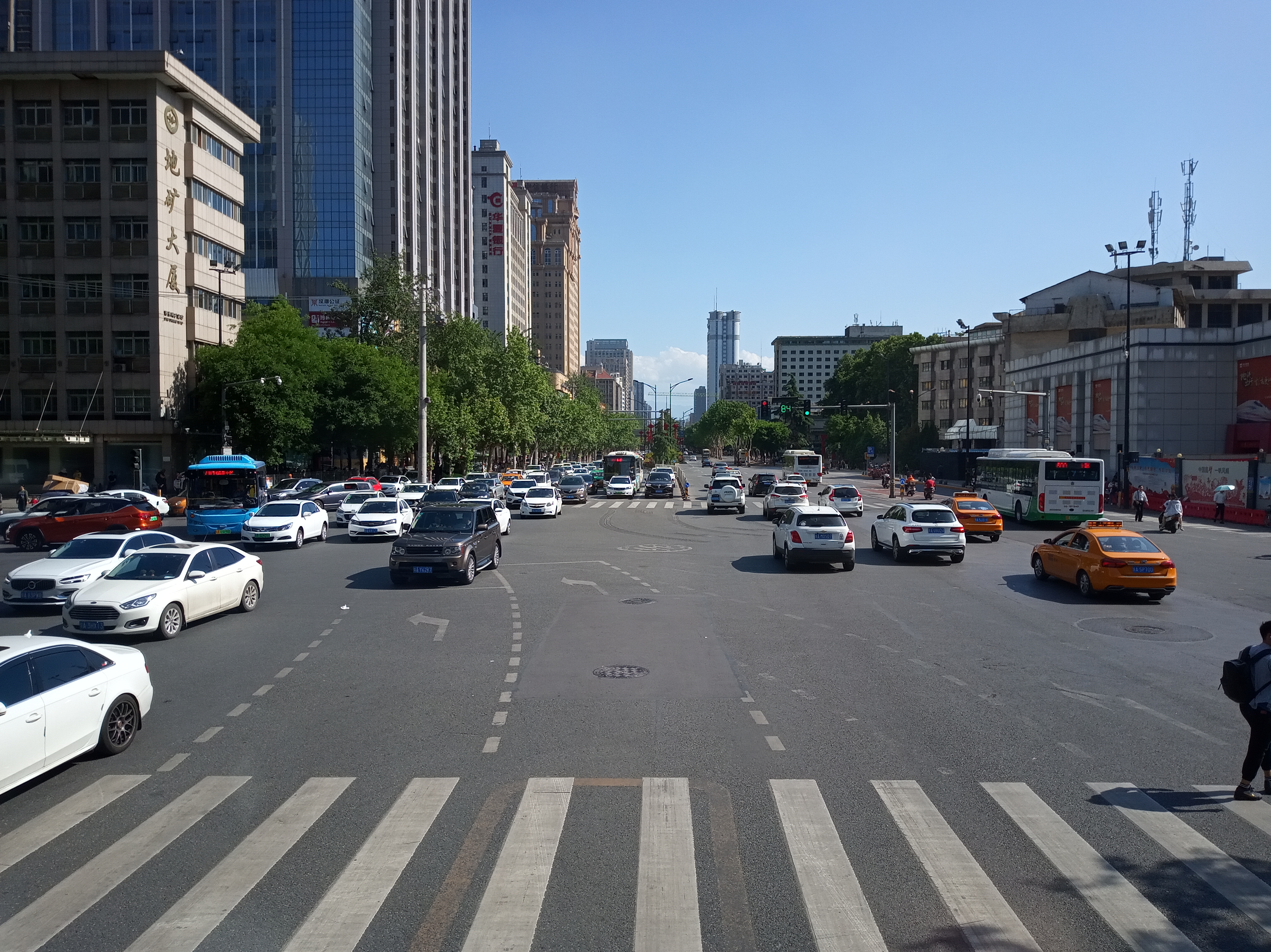
- Interactive map of Beilin
- Coordinates: 34°14′55″N 108°57′28″E
- Country: People's Republic of China
- Province: Shaanxi
- Sub-provincial city: Xi'an

Area
  - Total: 23.37 km^{2} (9.02 sq mi)

Population (2019)
  - Total: 734,000
  - Density: 26,298.54/km^{2} (68,112.9/sq mi)
- Time zone: UTC+8 (China Standard)
- Postal code: 710000

Beilin District (simplified Chinese: 碑林区; traditional Chinese: 碑林區; pinyin: Bēilín Qū) is one of 11 urban districts of the prefecture-level city of Xi'an, the capital of Shaanxi Province, Northwest China. It is named after the well-known Xi'an Stele Forest, and Small Wild Goose Pagoda is also located in the district. The smallest, but most densely populated, of Xi'an's county-level divisions, it borders the districts of Xincheng to the northeast, Yanta to the south, and Lianhu to the northwest.

== History ==
The area around the present district was organized as Xianning County (simplified Chinese: 咸宁县; traditional Chinese: 咸寜縣; pinyin: Xiánníng Xiàn; lit. 'Completely Peaceful County') during the Qing Dynasty. At the time, the name was variously spelled Hien-ning, Hsien-ning, and Hsien-ning-hsien.

== Administrative divisions ==
As of 2020, Beilin District is divided to 8 subdistricts.

Subdistricts

- Nanyuanmen Subdistrict (南院门街道)
- Baishulin Subdistrict (柏树林街道)
- Changlefang Subdistrict (长乐坊街道)
- Dongguannanjie Subdistrict (东关南街街道)
- Taiyilu Subdistrict (太乙路街道)
- Wenyilu Subdistrict (文艺路街道)
- Chang'anlu Subdistrict (长安路街道)
- Zhangjiacun Subdistrict (张家村街道)

== Population ==
According to the seventh national census, at 00:00 on November 1, 2020: the resident population of the region was 756,840 people.

== Tourist Attractions ==
- Stele Forest
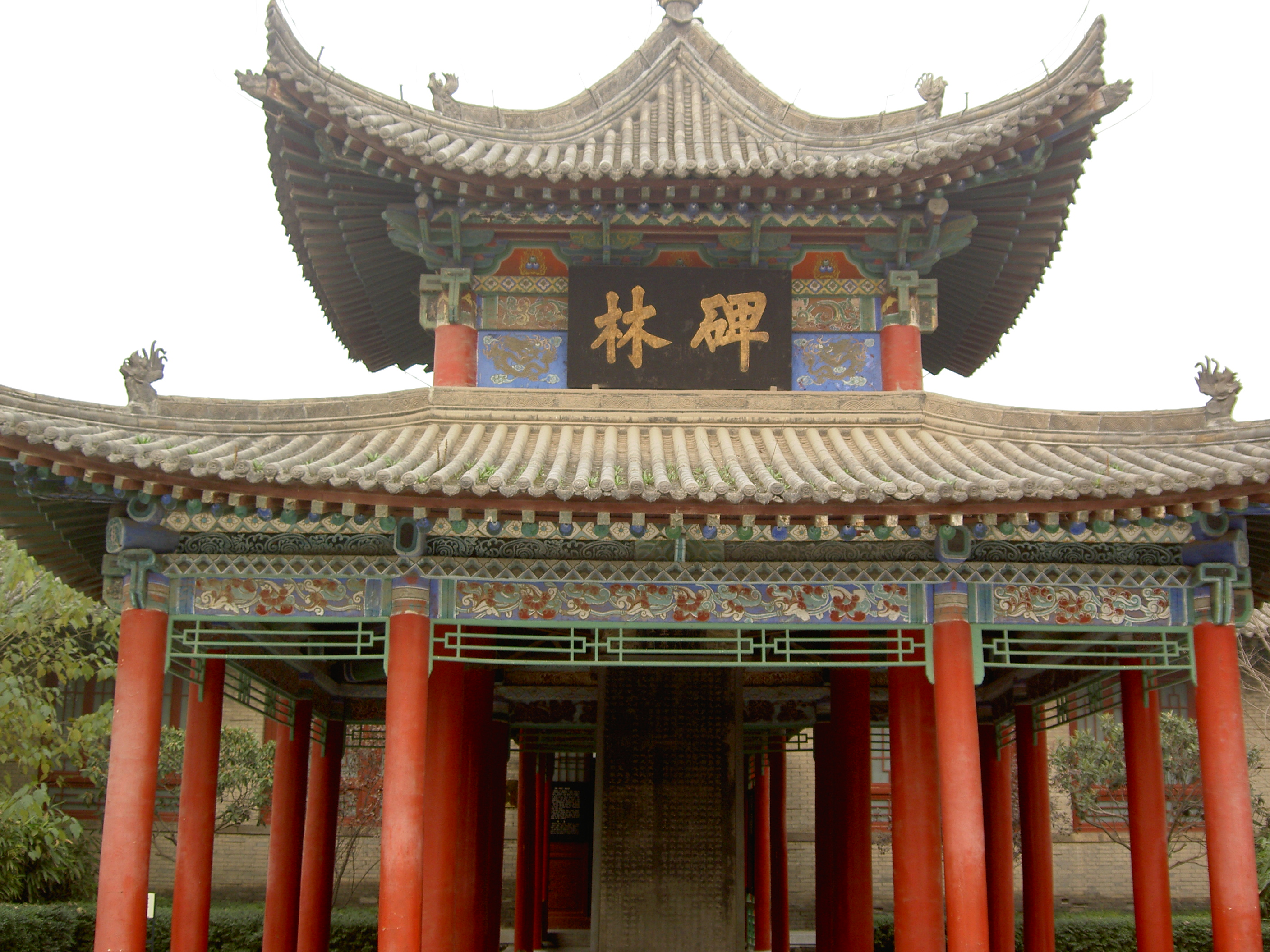
- avilion at the Stele Forest in Xi'an
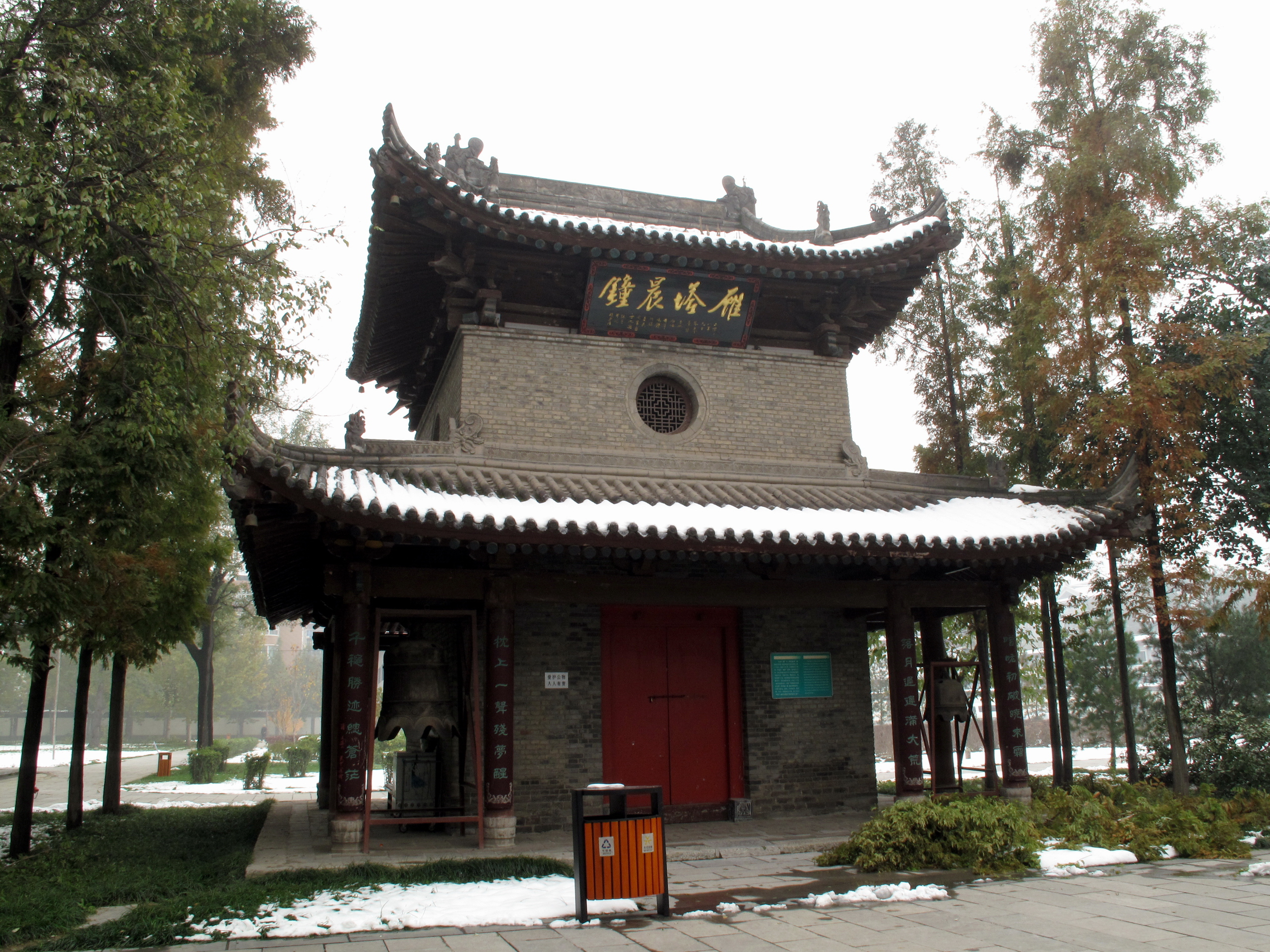
  Jianfu Temple
  Jianfu Temple
- Small Wild Goose Pagoda
- Xi'an Museum
- Xingqinggong Park
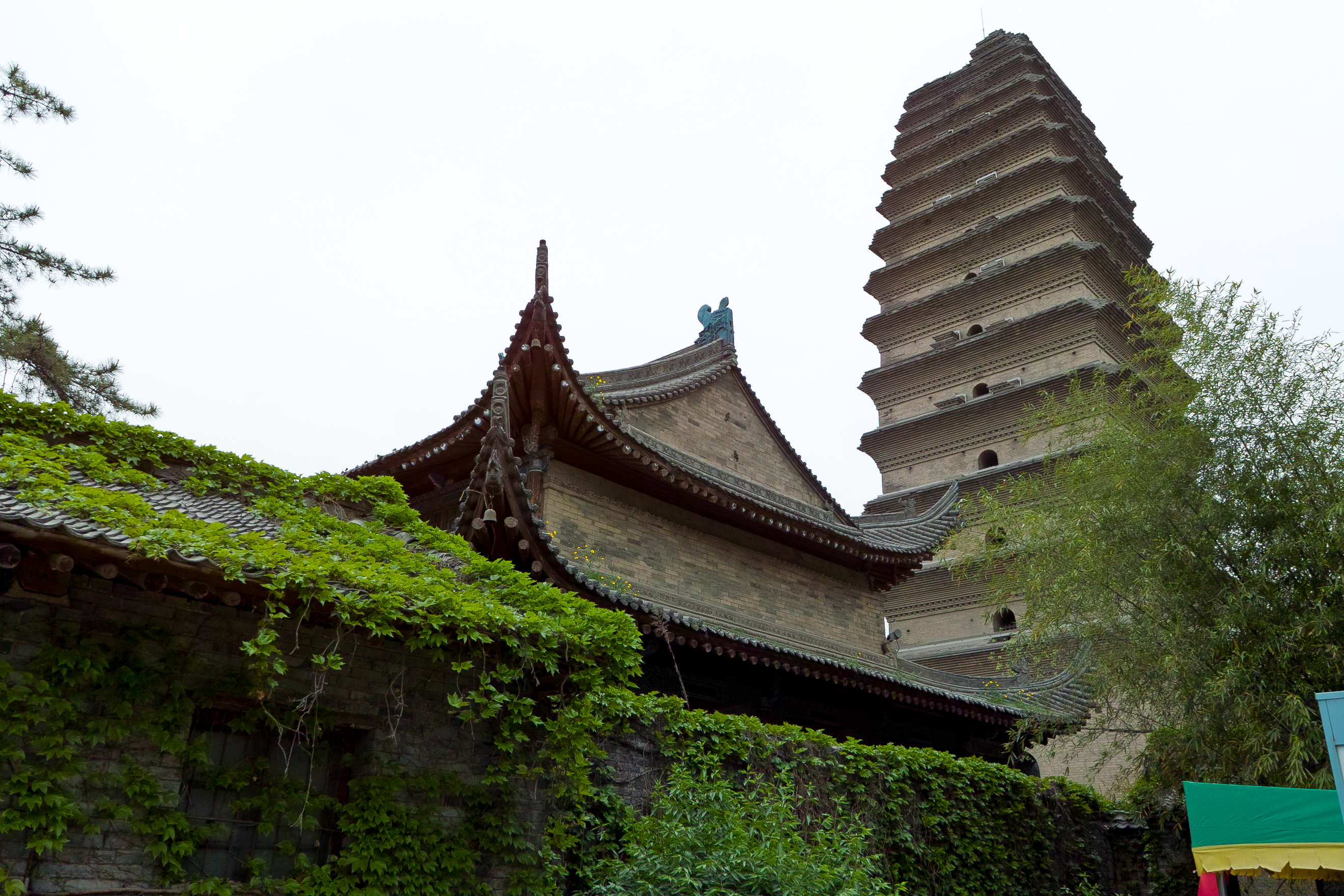
- Small Wild Goose Pagoda
  Wolong Temple

== Education ==
Beilin district is an important center of Xi'an. There are many educational institutions in Beilin.

=== University ===
- Xi'an Jiaotong University
- Northwest University
- Northwestern Polytechnical University
- Xi'an University of Architecture and Technology
- Xi'an University of Technology
- Xi'an Polytechnic University

=== High school ===
- Middle School Attached to Northwestern Polytechnical University
- High School Affiliated to Xi'an Jiaotong University
