= XPU =

XPU or xpu may refer to:

- Xi'an Polytechnic University, a college located in Xi'an, Shaanxi Province, China
- XPU, the China Railway Pinyin code for Xipu station, Chengdu, Sichuan, China
- xpu, the ISO 639-3 code for Punic language
