= Chen Lu =

Chen Lu or Lu Chen may refer to:

== People named Chen Lu ==
- Chen Lu (painter) (fl. 15th century), Ming dynasty painter
- Lu Chen (scientist) (born 1972), Chinese-born American neuroscientist
- Chen Lu (figure skater) (born 1976), Chinese figure skater
- Chen Lu (badminton) (born 1997), Chinese badminton player
- Chen Lu, one of the villains who use the name Radioactive Man

== People named Lu Chen ==
- Lu Chen (magician) (born 1976), Taiwanese magician
- Lu Chen (actress) (born 1987), Chinese actress

== See also ==
- Chenlu, a town in Yintai District, Tongchuan, Shaanxi, China
- Lu Zhen (957–1014), Song dynasty official and historian, romanized "Lu Chen" in Wade–Giles
