= Jianxi, Luoyang =

Coordinates: 34°41′13″N 112°27′49″E

Jianxi 涧西区
- District
- Interactive map of Jianxi
- Country: People's Republic of China
- Province: Henan
- Prefecture-level city: Luoyang

Area
  - Total: 89 km^{2} (34 sq mi)

Population (2019)
  - Total: 699,300
  - Density: 7,900/km^{2} (20,000/sq mi)
- Time zone: UTC+8 (China Standard)
- Postal code: 471000

Jianxi District (simplified Chinese: 涧西区; traditional Chinese: 澗西區; pinyin: Jiànxī Qū) is a district of the city of Luoyang, Henan province, China.

Jianxi District was established in July 1955. It is located to the west of Jian River and Xigong District is east of the Jian River. Jianxi is a manufacturing center.

== Administrative divisions ==
As of 2012, this district is divided to 11 subdistricts.

Subdistricts

- Hubeilu Subdistrict (湖北路街道)
- Changchunlu Subdistrict (长春路街道)
- Tianjinlu Subdistrict (天津路街道)
- Chongqinglu Subdistrict (重庆路街道)
- Chang'anlu Subdistrict (长安路街道)
- Wuhanlu Subdistrict (武汉路街道)
- Zhengzhoulu Subdistrict (郑州路街道)
- Zhujianglu Subdistrict (珠江路街道)
- Nanchanglu Subdistrict (南昌路街道)
- Zhoushanlu Subdistrict (周山路街道)
- Xujiaying Subdistrict (徐家营街道)
