= Middle School Attached to Northwestern Polytechnical University =

Coordinates: 34.2420°N 108.9130°E

- 西工大附中
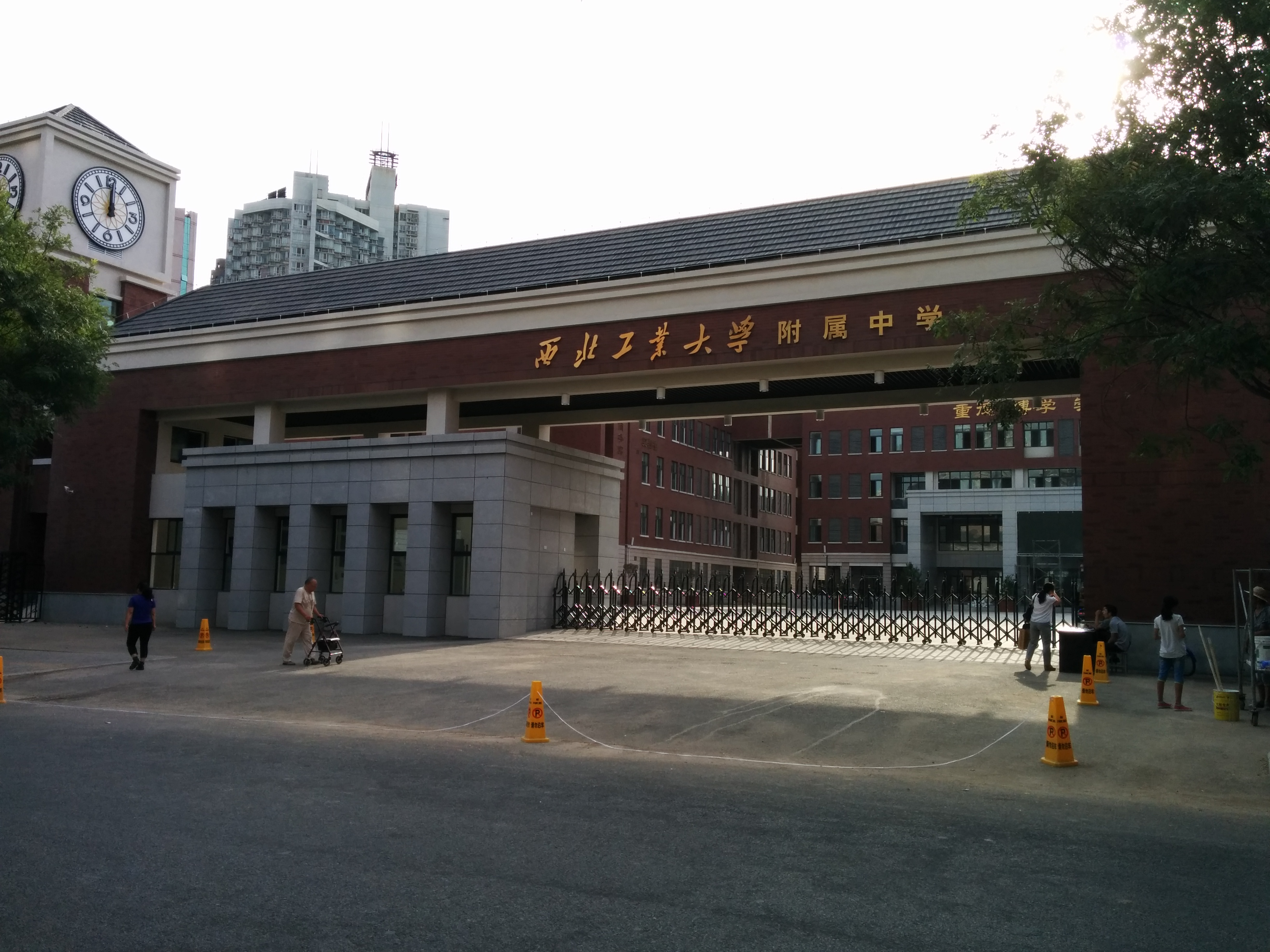

Location
- 127 Youyixilu Beilin Xi'an Shaanxi China

Information
- Type: High school
- Motto: 重德 博学 崇实 创新
- Established: 1971
- Principal: Li Ye
- Enrollment: >6000
- Campus size: ~50000 sq.meters
- Other name: NPUMS
- Website: http://www.xgdfz.com

Middle School Attached to Northwestern Polytechnical University (NPUMS; Chinese: 西北工业大学附属中学; pinyin: Xīběi Gōngyè Dàxué Fùshǔ Zhōngxué) or Xigongda High School is a secondary school (including grades 7–12) in Xi'an, Shaanxi Province, China affiliated with the Northwestern Polytechnical University.

It is located in the southern suburbs of Xi'an and covers an area of over 34,000 square meters. The school's staff consists of 235 people and hosts more than 4,000 students. Since 1995, Xigongda High School has rapidly developed. From 2000 to the present, 98% of its students have scored at or above the required score on their college entrance examination boards to get into leading universities.

It is often ranked as one of the top 5 middle schools in China in terms of the number of students matriculating at Peking University and Tsinghua University. For instance, in 2020, the number of students admitted to these top two universities in China was 87, ranked the 4th nationally. Meanwhile, NPUMS also consistently has the most number of students winning national and international level competitions in Shannxi province and across northwestern China.

== History ==
Founded in 1971, the school became one of the key schools in Shaanxi by 1985, and eventually "the demonstrate school in Shaanxi" on 14 April 2009.

== Academic performance ==
Students from NPUMS perform well in the Zhongkao and Gaokao exams.

In terms of college admission, 104 students in the NPUMS received an offer for Tsinghua University (TSU) and Peking University (PKU) in 2013. NPUMS is the only school outside of Beijing that has received over 100 offers from TSU and PKU.
