= Zhangjiacun Subdistrict =

Subdistrict in Xi'an, Shaanxi, China

Coordinates: 34.24058°N 108.9183°E

Zhangjiacun Subdistrict (Chinese: 张家村街道) is a subdistrict of Beilin District, Xi'an.

== See also ==
- List of township-level divisions of Shaanxi
