= Baishulin Subdistrict =

Subdistrict in Xi'an, Shaanxi, China

Coordinates: 34°15′33″N 108°57′38″E

Baishulin Subdistrict (Chinese: 柏树林街道) is a subdistrict of Beilin District, Xi'an.

== See also ==
- List of township-level divisions of Shaanxi
