= Xiangyang Subdistrict, Weinan =

Xiangyang Subdistrict 向阳街道
- Subdistrict
- Location in China
- Coordinates: 34°29′59″N 109°30′47″E
- Country: People's Republic of China
- Province: Shaanxi
- Prefecture-level city: Weinan
- District: Linwei District
- Time zone: UTC+8 (China Standard)

Xiangyang Subdistrict (Chinese: 向阳街道; pinyin: Xiàngyáng Jiēdào) is a subdistrict in Linwei District, Weinan, Shaanxi, China. As of 2018, it has 26 residential communities under its administration.

== See also ==
- List of township-level divisions of Shaanxi
