= Dayu Subdistrict, Yanchuan County =

Dayu Subdistrict 大禹街道
- Subdistrict
- Location in China
- Coordinates: 36°52′54″N 110°11′1″E
- Country: People's Republic of China
- Province: Shaanxi
- Prefecture-level city: Yan'an
- County: Yanchuan County
- Time zone: UTC+8 (China Standard)

Dayu Subdistrict (Chinese: 大禹街道; pinyin: Dàyǔ Jiēdào) is a subdistrict in Yanchuan County, Shaanxi, China. As of 2023, it administers seven residential communities and 29 villages.

== Communities ==
- Hedong Community (河东社区)
- Beiguan Community (北关社区)
- Nanguan Community (南关社区)
- Beixinjie Community (北新街社区)
- Dongfeng Community (东峰社区)
- Zhangjiawan Community (张家湾社区)
- Guojiata Community (郭家塔社区)

== Villages ==
- Zhaojiagou Village (赵家沟村)
- Yangjiawan Village (杨家湾村)
- Xiazhangjiawan Village (下张家湾村)
- Liujiawan Village (刘家湾村)
- Majiaping Village (马家坪村)
- Yangjiageta Village (杨家圪塔村)
- Majiadian Village (马家店村)
- Beiyuan Village (北塬村)
- Gaojiageta Village (高家圪台村)
- Hetuping Village (贺土坪村)
- Gaojiawan Village (高家湾村)
- Dujiahe Village (都家河村)
- Hejiawan Village (贺家湾村)
- Shangzhangjiawan Village (上张家湾村)
- Xigouhe Village (西沟河村)
- Liangjiacha Village (梁家岔村)
- Guojiata Village (郭家塔村)
- Hubaishan Village (虎白山村)
- Liujiahe Village (刘家河村)
- Baijiajian Village (白家硷村)
- Xingshan Village (杏山村)
- Mujiayao Village (幕家崾村)
- Yangjiaping Village (杨家坪村)
- Gaojiapan Village (高家畔村)
- Dongwa Village (东洼村)
- Shike Village (石克村)
- Luzewa Village (芦则洼村)
- Yantouyuan Village (眼头塬村)
- Nanhe Village (南河村)

== See also ==
- List of township-level divisions of Shaanxi
