= Dongguannanjie Subdistrict =

Subdistrict in Xi'an, Shaanxi, China

Dongguannanjie Subdistrict (Chinese: 东关南街街道) is a subdistrict of Beilin District, Xi'an.

== See also ==
- List of township-level divisions of Shaanxi
