= Changlefang Subdistrict =

Subdistrict in Xi'an, Shaanxi, China

Changlefang Subdistrict (Chinese: 长乐坊街道) is a subdistrict of Beilin District, Xi'an.

== See also ==
- List of township-level divisions of Shaanxi
