= Chenlu =

Chenlu 陈炉镇
- Town
- Location in China
- Coordinates: 35°1′43″N 109°9′17″E
- Country: People's Republic of China
- Province: Shaanxi
- Prefecture-level city: Tongchuan
- District: Yintai District
- Time zone: UTC+8 (China Standard)

Chenlu (simplified Chinese: 陈炉; traditional Chinese: 陳爐; pinyin: Chénlú) is a town in Yintai District, Tongchuan, Shaanxi province, China. As of 2018, it has 2 residential communities and 13 villages under its administration.

== See also ==
- List of township-level divisions of Shaanxi
