= Xiquan Subdistrict =

Xiquan Subdistrict 西泉街道
- Subdistrict
- Location in China
- Coordinates: 34°24′24″N 109°08′20″E
- Country: People's Republic of China
- Province: Shaanxi
- Prefecture-level city: Xi'an
- District: Lintong District
- Time zone: UTC+8 (China Standard)

Xiquan Subdistrict (Chinese: 西泉街道; pinyin: Xīquán Jiēdào) is a subdistrict in Lintong District, Xi'an, Shaanxi, China. As of 2023, it administers Xiquan Residential Community and the following ten villages:

- Xiquan Village
- Weizhuang Village (魏庄村)
- Sangyuan Village (桑园村)
- Xuankong Village (宣孔村)
- Maiwang Village (麦王村)
- Dongzhao Village (东赵村)
- Chunshu Village (椿树村)
- Xingwang Village (兴王村)
- Jia Village (贾村)
- Podi Village (坡底村)

== See also ==
- List of township-level divisions of Shaanxi
