= Wolong Temple =

Buddhist temple in Xi'an, China

Coordinates: 34°15′23″N 108°57′00″E

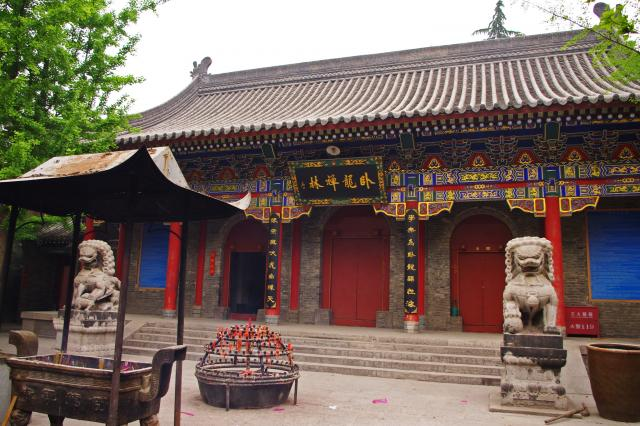
Wolong Temple

Wolong Temple (Chinese: 卧龙寺; pinyin: Wòlóng Sì) is located on Baishulin St., Beilin District, Xi'an, Shaanxi Province of China. It is the earliest Buddhist temple in Shaanxi. And one of the national key monasteries of Buddhism in the Han region.

== History ==
According to the stele in the temple, it was built during Lingdi's reign (AD 168–189), Han dynasty, more than 1,800 years ago. It was called "Fuying Chan Yuan" (福应禅院) during the Sui dynasty. The temple kept a painting of Guanyin drawn by Wu Daozi in the Tang dynasty, so it was also called "Guanyin Temple" (观音寺). It was renamed Wolong Temple during Taizong's reign of (976–997), Song dynasty. It was rebuilt in the Yuan, Ming and Qing dynasties.

In 1900, the Eight-Nation Alliance invaded Beijing, Empress Dowager Cixi and Emperor Guangxu took refuge in Xi'an, Empress Dowager Cixi gave 1,000 taels of silver to rebuild the temple and established a stone tablet. Cixi also personally wrote a plaque to the temple, and for the door of the mountain wrote "Royal Decree on the construction of the Ten Square Wolong Zen Forest" (敕建十方卧龙禅林). At the time, Tibet, Mongolia's lamas, princes sent all kinds of tributes, statues of Buddha, of which the statues were sent to the Wolong Temple under the order of feeding. In 1931, Zhu Ziqiao (朱子桥) and others to raise funds to renovate the Buddhist temple, and purchasing Buddhist scriptures to create a national library of Buddhist studies. Later, he also invited Taixu to preach the sutra.

During the Cultural Revolution, Wolong Monastery was destroyed by the Red Guards, and the abbot of the temple, Mr. Langzhao, and all the monks were forced to commit suicide by taking poison. In 1992, Wolong Temple was rebuilt.

== Building pattern ==
Wolong Temple is a typical Han Buddhist architectural style, which is divided into three courtyards: the middle courtyard, the east courtyard and the west courtyard.

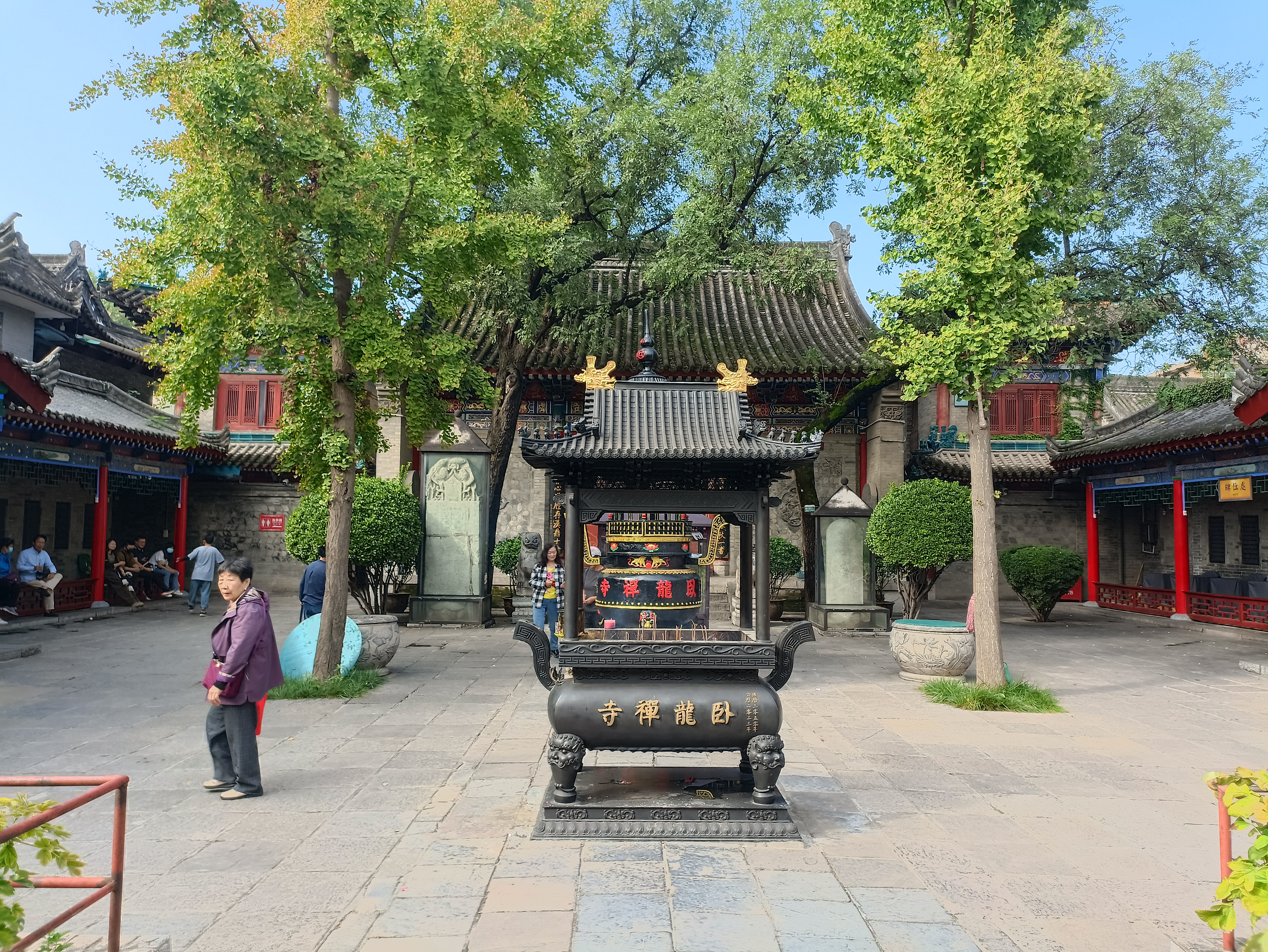

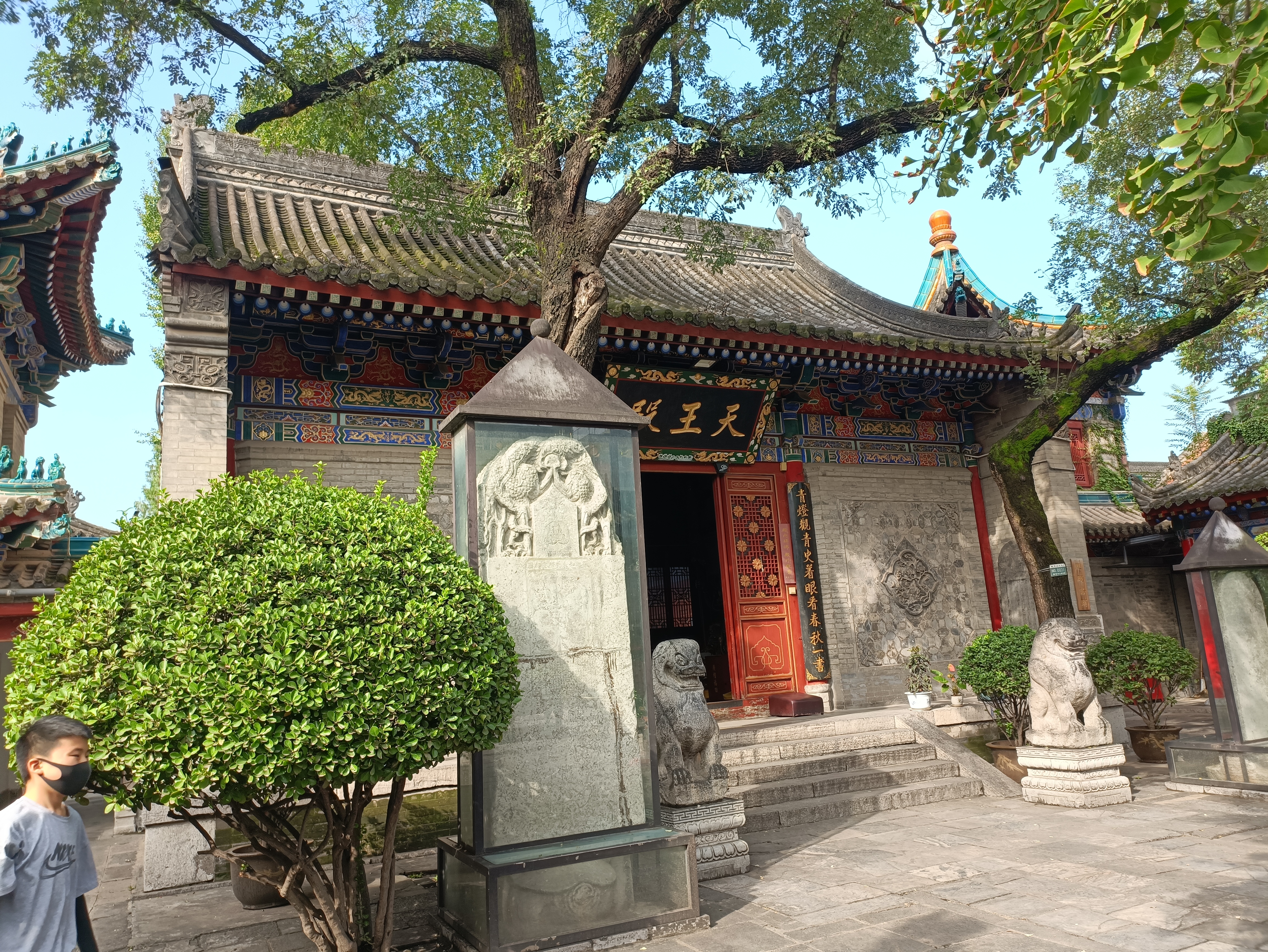

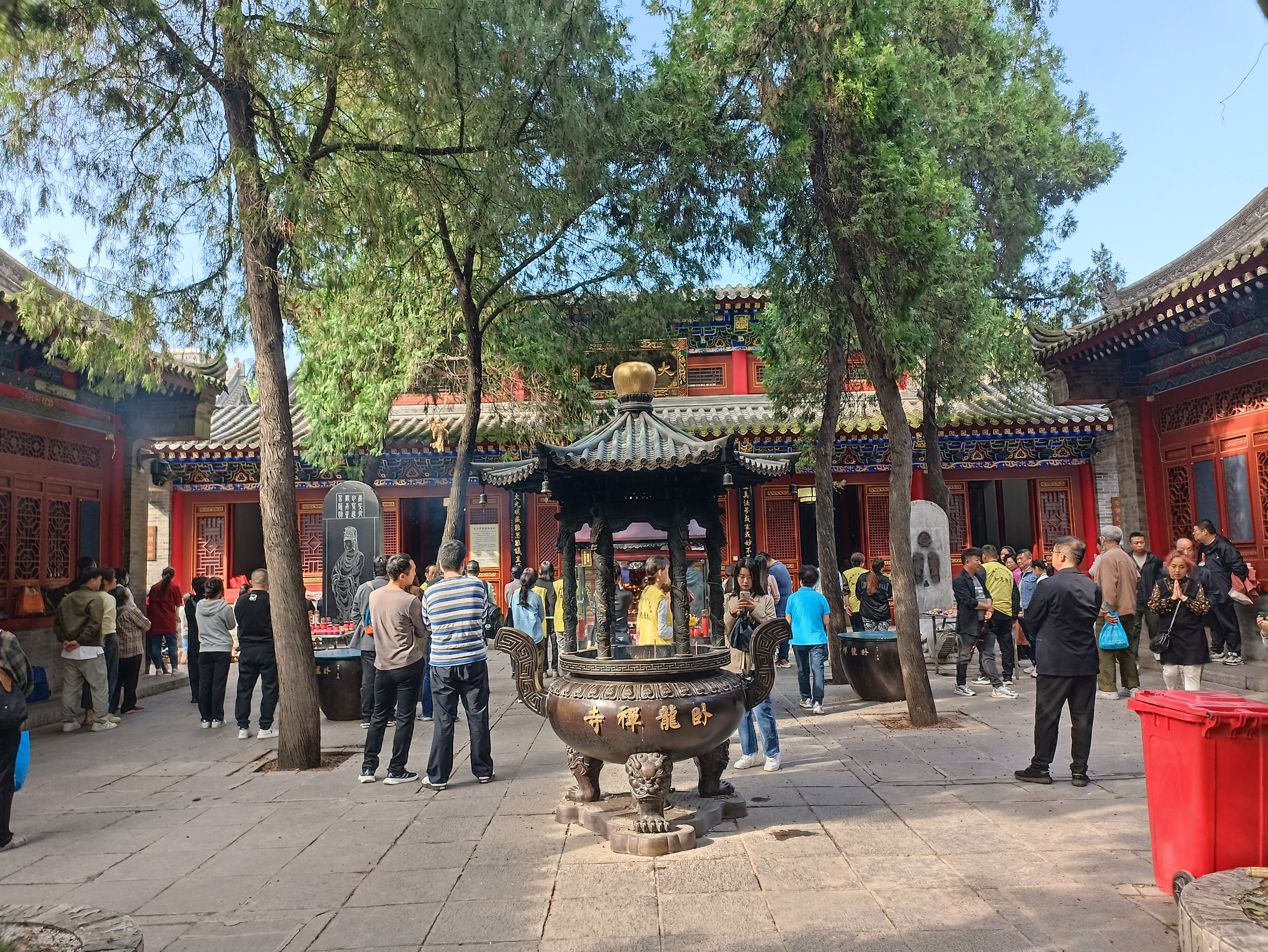

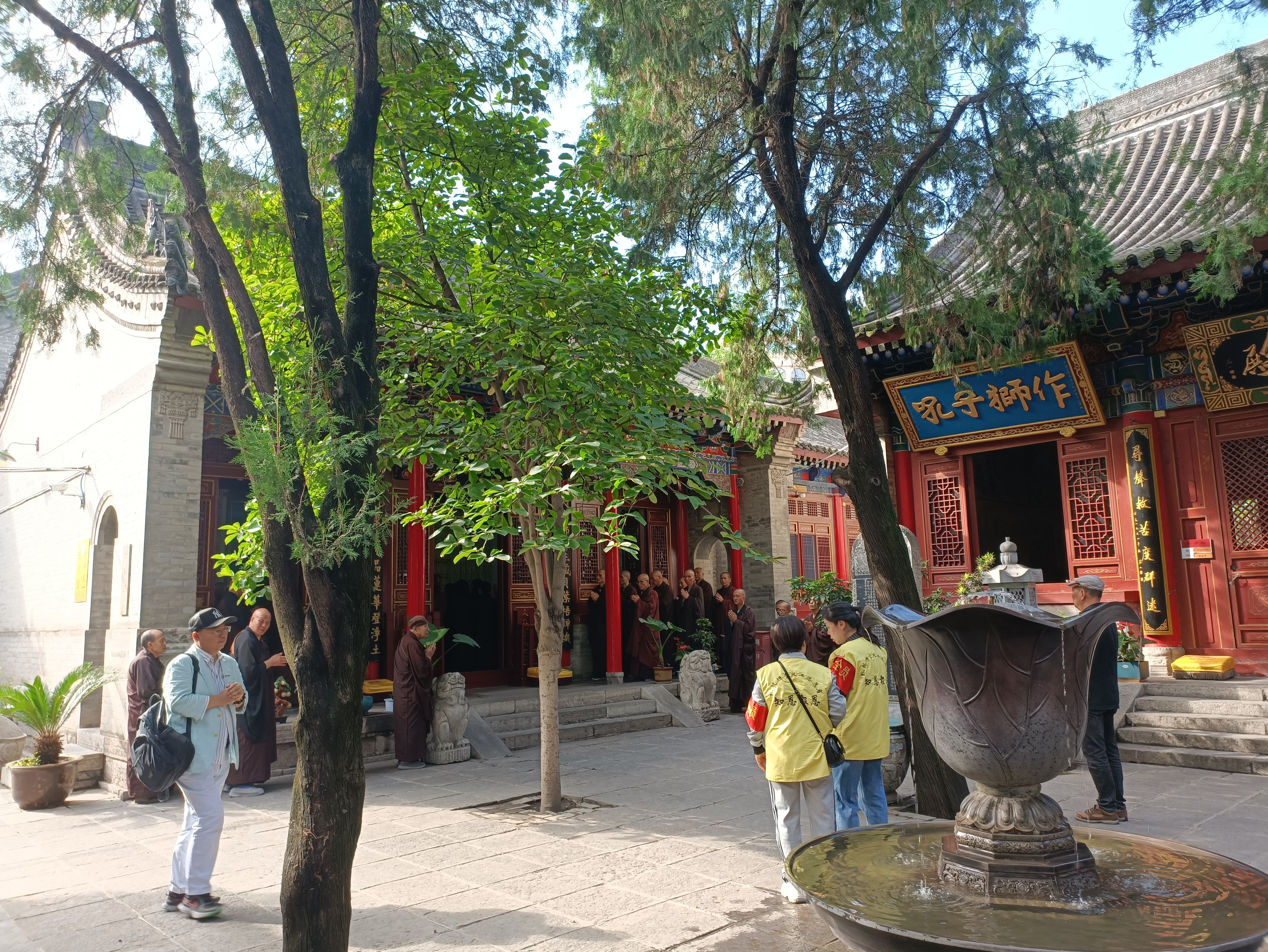

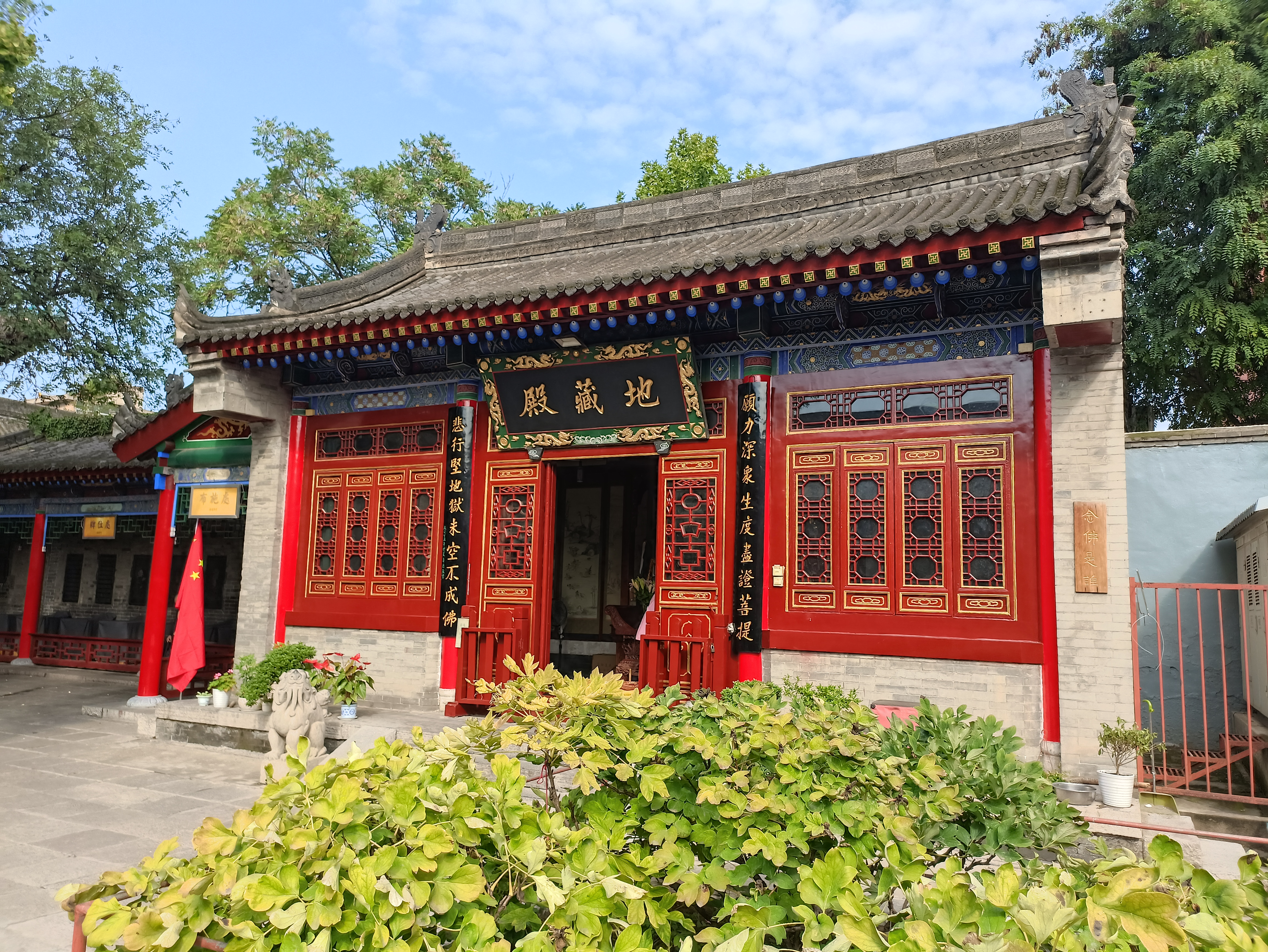
