= Liangtian Subdistrict =

Liangtian Subdistrict 良田街道
- Subdistrict
- Location in China
- Coordinates: 34°29′39″N 109°26′43″E
- Country: People's Republic of China
- Province: Shaanxi
- Prefecture-level city: Weinan
- District: Linwei District
- Time zone: UTC+8 (China Standard)

Liangtian Subdistrict (Chinese: 良田街道; pinyin: Liángtián Jiēdào) is a subdistrict in Linwei District, Weinan, Shaanxi, China. As of 2018, it has 6 villages under its administration.

== See also ==
- List of township-level divisions of Shaanxi
