= Shennong, Shanxi =

Town in Shanxi, China

Shennong 神农镇
- Town
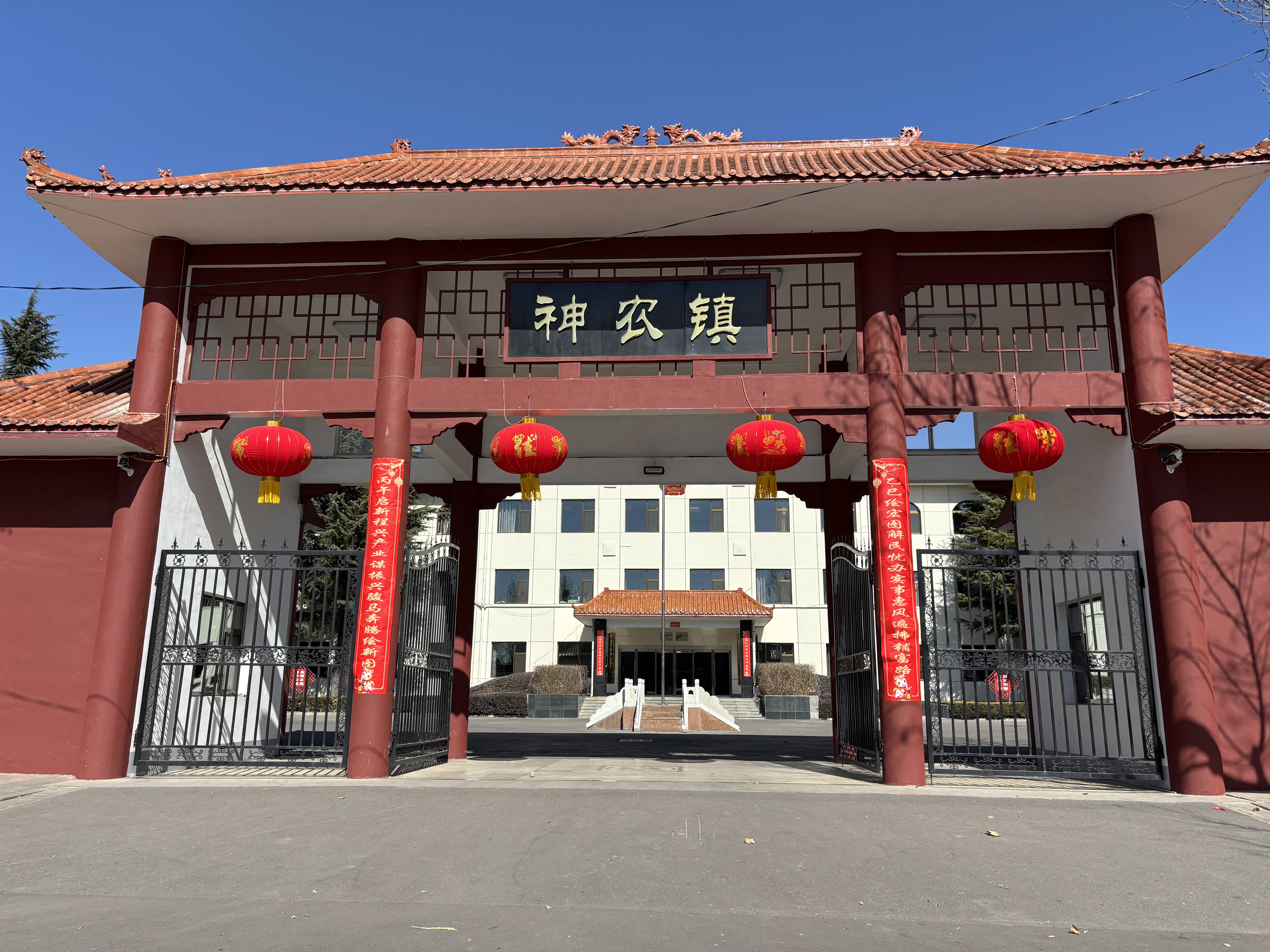
- People's Government of Shennong Town

- Location in Shanxi
- Coordinates: 35°52′43″N 112°57′55″E
- Country: People's Republic of China
- Province: Shanxi
- Prefecture-level city: Jincheng
- County-level city: Gaoping
- Time zone: UTC+8 (China Standard)

Shennong (simplified Chinese: 神农; traditional Chinese: 神農; pinyin: Shénnóng) is a town under the administration of Gaoping, Shanxi, China. As of 2023, it administers the following 23 villages:

- Tuandong Village (团东村)
- Tuanxi Village (团西村)
- Dongsha Village (东沙村)
- Kouze Village (口则村)
- Shihe Village (石壑村)
- Lingdong Village (岭东村)
- Zhuangli Village (庄里村)
- Huanma Village (换马村)
- Guguan Village (故关村)
- Xujia Village (许家村)
- Xiposhang Village (西坡上村)
- Changzhenpo Village (长畛坡村)
- Donghaozhuang Village (东郝庄村)
- Chiyuan Village (池院村)
- Lijiazhuang Village (李家庄村)
- Dongshayuan Village (东沙院村)
- Xishayuan Village (西沙院村)
- Qiu Village (邱村)
- Zhongmiao Village (中庙村)
- Zhong Village (中村)
- Xiaoxigou Village (小西沟村)
- Xiaohexi Village (小河西村)
- Shenjia Village (申家村)
