= Taibai County =

Taibai County 太白县
- County
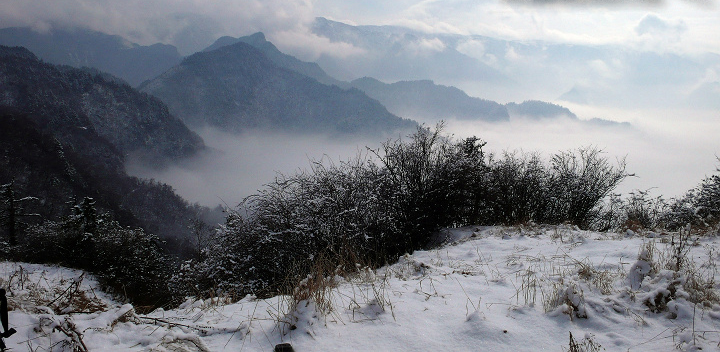

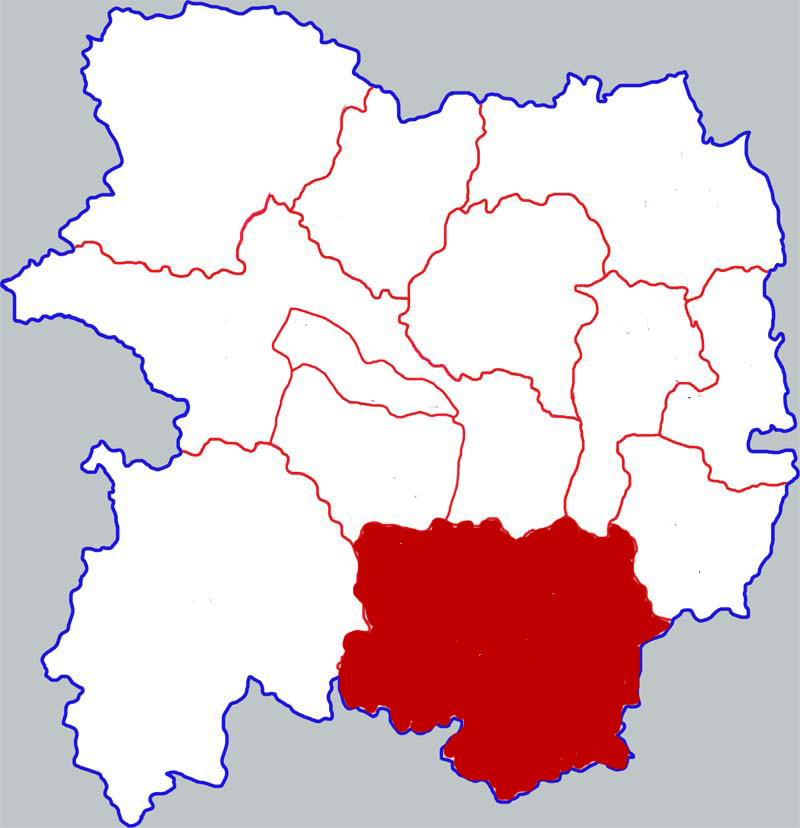
- Taibai in Baoji

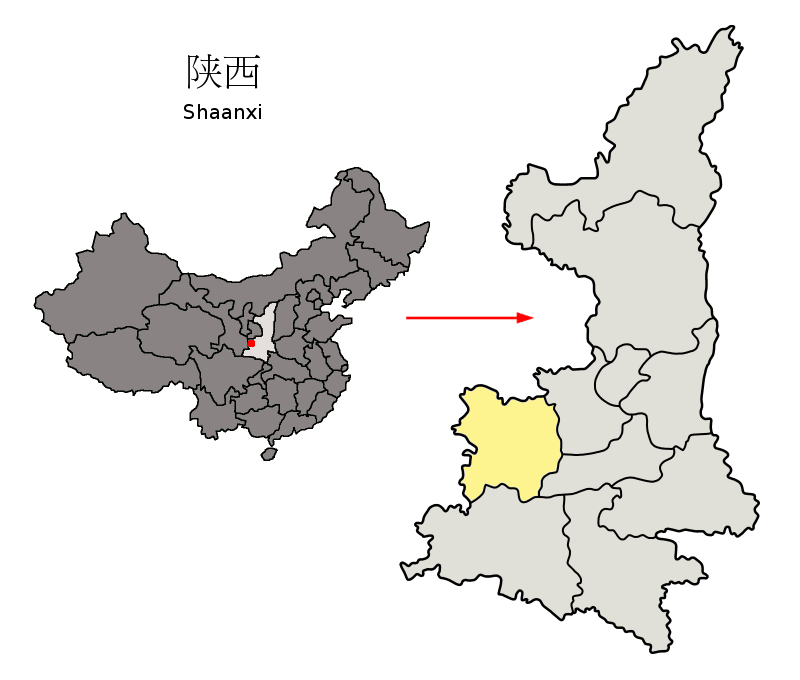
- Baoji in Shaanxi
- Coordinates: 34°03′29″N 107°19′08″E
- Country: People's Republic of China
- Province: Shaanxi
- Prefecture-level city: Baoji

Area
  - Total: 2,780 km^{2} (1,070 sq mi)
- Elevation: 1,543 m (5,062 ft)
- Highest elevation (Mount Taibai): 3,771 m (12,372 ft)
- Lowest elevation: 740 m (2,430 ft)

Population (2019)
  - Total: 51,513
  - Density: 18.5/km^{2} (48.0/sq mi)
- Time zone: UTC+8 (China standard time)
- Postal Code: 721600

Taibai County (simplified Chinese: 太白县; traditional Chinese: 太白縣; pinyin: Tàibái Xiàn) is a county in the west of Shaanxi province, China. It is under the administration of the prefecture-level city of Baoji.

Taibai County is located west of the Qin Mountains and southeast of downtown Baoji. It is named after nearby Mount Taibai, a major peak of the Qin Mountains. It has five towns and three townships, including 66 administrative villages, and covers an area of 2,780 km^{2} (1,070 sq mi). It has a population of 52,000. The county was first established on December 27, 1952, being part of neighboring counties before then.

The county is noted for its high air quality, 92% of the county is covered by forests.

== Administrative divisions ==
As of 2020, Taibai County is divided to 7 towns. In 2001, Baiyun township was merged into Zuitou and Erlangba township was merged into Huangbaiyuan. In 2011, Guanglong township was merged into Yingge, and Huangbaiyuan and Wangjialeng were changed from township to town.

Towns

- Zuitou (嘴头镇)
- Taochuan (桃川镇)
- Yingge (鶯歌镇)
- Jingkou (靖口镇)
- Taibaihe (太白河镇)
- Huangbaiyuan (黄柏塬镇)
- Wangjialeng (王家堎镇)

== Climate ==
Climate data for Taibai, elevation 1,576 m (5,171 ft), (1991–2020 normals, extremes 1981–2010)
Month	Jan	Feb	Mar	Apr	May	Jun	Jul	Aug	Sep	Oct	Nov	Dec	Year
Record high °C (°F)	15.1 (59.2)	20.6 (69.1)	27.6 (81.7)	30.5 (86.9)	31.9 (89.4)	33.5 (92.3)	34.0 (93.2)	32.9 (91.2)	33.0 (91.4)	25.8 (78.4)	21.3 (70.3)	17.5 (63.5)	34.0 (93.2)
Mean daily maximum °C (°F)	3.3 (37.9)	6.0 (42.8)	11.0 (51.8)	17.2 (63.0)	20.8 (69.4)	24.1 (75.4)	26.1 (79.0)	24.9 (76.8)	20.0 (68.0)	15.1 (59.2)	10.2 (50.4)	5.1 (41.2)	15.3 (59.6)
Daily mean °C (°F)	−3.8 (25.2)	−0.7 (30.7)	4.3 (39.7)	10.0 (50.0)	13.8 (56.8)	17.3 (63.1)	19.7 (67.5)	18.5 (65.3)	14.0 (57.2)	8.6 (47.5)	3.2 (37.8)	−2.2 (28.0)	8.6 (47.4)
Mean daily minimum °C (°F)	−9.2 (15.4)	−5.8 (21.6)	−0.9 (30.4)	4.2 (39.6)	8.0 (46.4)	11.7 (53.1)	14.8 (58.6)	14.0 (57.2)	10.0 (50.0)	4.2 (39.6)	−1.8 (28.8)	−7.5 (18.5)	3.5 (38.3)
Record low °C (°F)	−24.5 (−12.1)	−19.2 (−2.6)	−15.2 (4.6)	−11.4 (11.5)	−3.5 (25.7)	0.0 (32.0)	4.0 (39.2)	4.7 (40.5)	−1.8 (28.8)	−9.3 (15.3)	−20.2 (−4.4)	−29.8 (−21.6)	−29.8 (−21.6)
Average precipitation mm (inches)	5.2 (0.20)	10.7 (0.42)	21.0 (0.83)	40.9 (1.61)	77.2 (3.04)	104.9 (4.13)	124.5 (4.90)	126.8 (4.99)	126.0 (4.96)	60.5 (2.38)	17.0 (0.67)	4.9 (0.19)	719.6 (28.32)
Average precipitation days (≥ 0.1 mm)	6.4	7.3	8.7	9.2	12.6	13.3	13.2	13.3	14.2	12.7	7.1	5.0	123
Average snowy days	10.2	10.1	7.2	1.6	0.2	0	0	0	0	1.1	5.6	8.1	44.1
Average relative humidity (%)	61	62	62	62	67	74	78	81	82	78	69	62	70
Mean monthly sunshine hours	154.4	139.3	161.5	182.2	192.2	179.2	191.5	172.0	118.1	133.9	150.6	164.7	1,939.6
Percentage possible sunshine	49	45	43	46	44	42	44	42	32	39	49	54	44
Source: China Meteorological Administration
