= Xinshi, Mianzhu =

Xinshi 新市镇
- Town
- Location in Sichuan
- Coordinates: 31°13′12″N 104°10′58″E
- Country: People's Republic of China
- Province: Sichuan
- Prefecture-level city: Deyang
- County-level city: Mianzhu
- Village-level divisions: 2 residential community 13 villages
- Elevation: 554 m (1,818 ft)
- Time zone: UTC+8 (China Standard)
- Area code: 0838

Xinshi (Chinese: 新市; pinyin: Xīnshì; lit. 'new city') is a town under the administration of Mianzhu City in northern Sichuan, People's Republic of China, located about 13 kilometres (8.1 mi) south-southwest of downtown Mianzhu. As of 2011, it has two residential communities (社区) and 13 villages under its administration.

== See also ==
- List of township-level divisions of Sichuan
