= Taochuan, Shaanxi =

Taochuan 桃川镇
- Town
- Location within China
- Coordinates: 34°3′23″N 107°32′52″E
- Country: China
- Province: Shaanxi
- Prefecture: Baoji
- County: Taibai County

Area
  - Total: 337 km^{2} (130 sq mi)

Population (2010)
  - Total: 6,106
  - Density: 18.1/km^{2} (46.9/sq mi)
- Time zone: UTC+8 (China Standard)

Taochuan (Chinese: 桃川镇) is a town located in the Taibai County of Baoji, Shaanxi, China.
