= Xingqinggong Park =

Park in Xi'an, China

Coordinates: 34°15′21″N 108°58′44″E

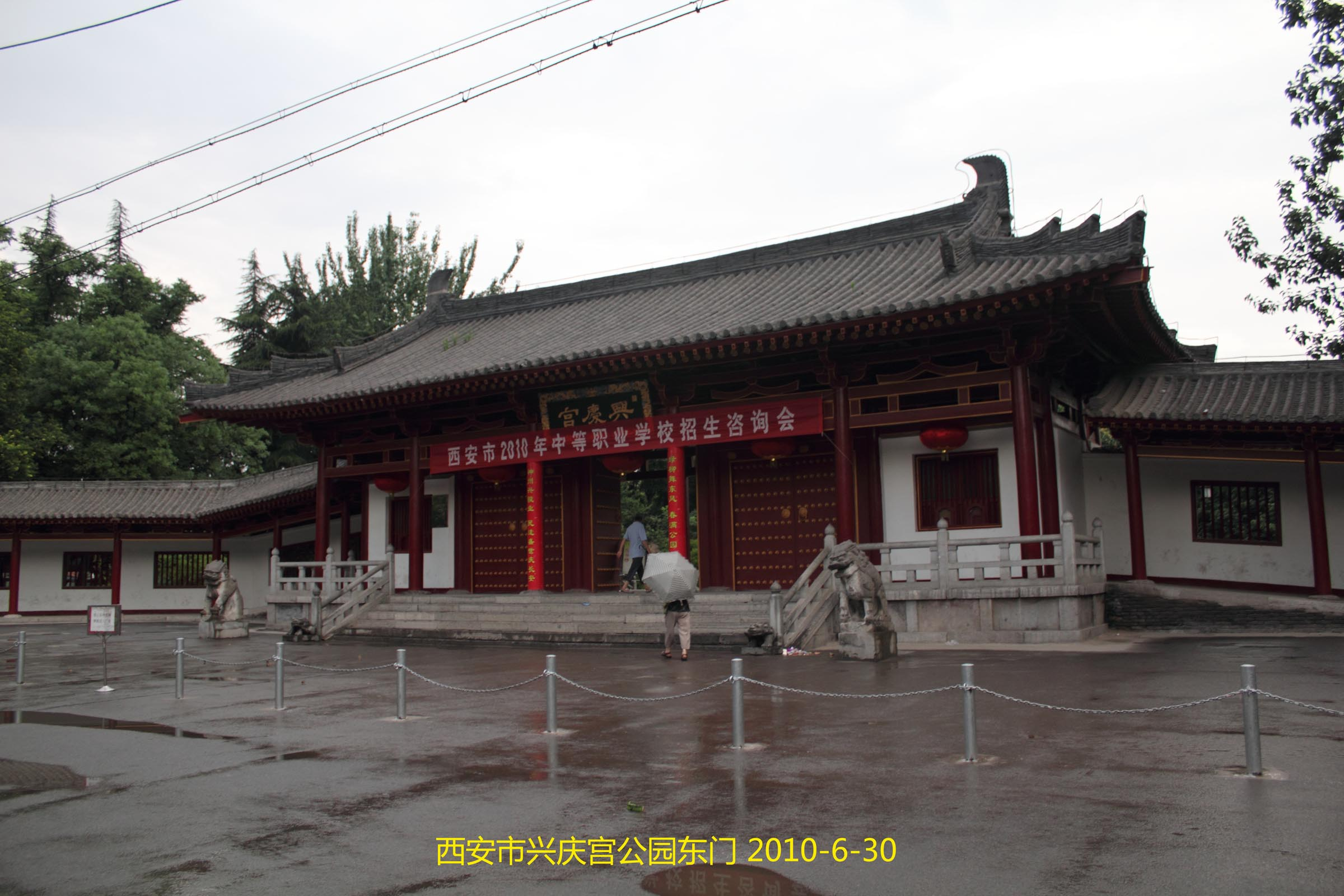
The eastern gate of Xingqinggong Park, Xi'an, China

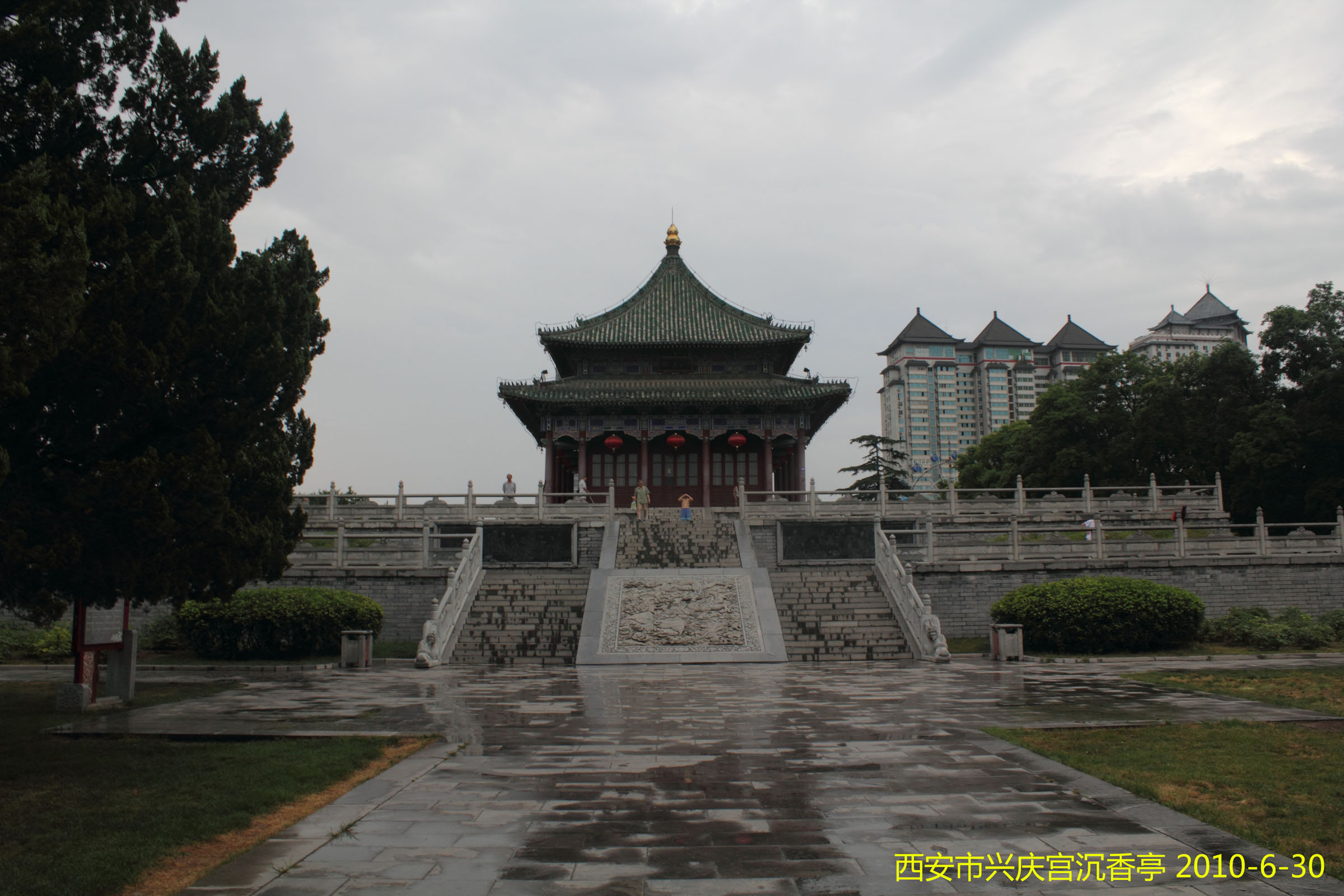
The Chenxiang Pavilion in the park

Xingqinggong Park (Chinese: 兴庆宫公园) is a city park in Xi'an, the capital of Shaanxi Province, China. With an area of 743 acres, it is the largest park in Xi'an's city proper. Meanwhile, Xingqing Palace was a famous palace in the Tang Dynasty and was the center of political gravity during the reign of Emperor Xuanzong of the Tang Dynasty, known as "Nannei"(南内).

== General ==
Xingqinggong Park was built in 1958 on the former site of Xinqing Palace (see below), when Xi'an Jiaotong University was established directly in its south. The park's main entrance faces Xi'an Jiaotong University.

The park has 150 acres of Xingqing Lake and the Chenxiang Pavilion, which is built in the Tang Dynasty architecture.

== Xingqing Palace ==
The Xingqing Palace was originally an old house, called Longqing Fang, where Li Longji lived with his five brothers when he was a prince. After becoming a palace, he changed its name.

At the end of the Tang Dynasty, the Xingqing Palace was destroyed, and by the beginning of the Qing Dynasty, the site gradually became a farmland.

On May 31, 1957, the Xingqing Palace site was listed as a cultural relic protection unit of Shaanxi Province.

In 1958, in order to cooperate with the westward relocation of the Xi'an Jiaotong University, Xingqing Palace Park was built on the site, covering an area of 743 acres, which is the largest park in Xi'an. The main entrance faces Xi'an Jiaotong University. The park consists of 150 acres of Xingqing Lake and the old names of Chenxiang Ting(沉香亭), Huaexianghui Lou(花萼相辉楼), Nanxun Ge(南薰阁), etc., which were used in the Tang Dynasty. The Chenxiang Ting(沉香亭) on the island in the center of the lake is modeled after a Tang Dynasty building.

== See also ==
- Xi'an Jiaotong University
