= Jingkou, Shaanxi =

Jingkou 靖口镇
- Town
- Location within China
- Coordinates: 33°59′39″N 107°6′58″E
- Country: China
- Province: Shaanxi
- Prefecture: Baoji
- County: Taibai County

Population (2010)
  - Total: 3,260
- Time zone: UTC+8 (China Standard)

Jingkou (Chinese: 靖口镇) is a town located in the Taibai County of Baoji, Shaanxi, China.
