= Xinshi, Ziyang =

Xinshi 新市镇
- Town
- Location in Sichuan
- Coordinates: 30°20′00″N 104°34′38″E
- Country: People's Republic of China
- Province: Sichuan
- Prefecture-level city: Ziyang
- County-level city: Jianyang
- Village-level divisions: 1 residential community 34 villages
- Elevation: 388 m (1,273 ft)
- Time zone: UTC+8 (China Standard)
- Area code: 0028

Xinshi (Chinese: 新市; pinyin: Xīnshì; lit. 'new city') is a town under the administration of Jianyang City in northern Sichuan, People's Republic of China, located about 6 to 7 kilometres (3.7 to 4.3 mi) southeast of downtown Jianyang on the southern (right) bank of the Tuo River and is served by China National Highway 321. As of 2011, it has one residential community (社区) and 34 villages under its administration.

== See also ==
- List of township-level divisions of Sichuan
