= Yingge, Taibai =

Yingge 鹦鸽镇
- Town
- Location within China
- Coordinates: 34°5′43″N 107°38′52″E
- Country: China
- Province: Shaanxi
- Prefecture: Baoji
- County: Taibai County

Population (2010)
  - Total: 9,048
- Time zone: UTC+8 (China Standard)

Yingge (Chinese: 鹦鸽镇) is a town located in the Taibai County of Baoji, Shaanxi, China.
