= Xinshi, Yibin =

Xinshi 新市镇
- Town
- Location in Sichuan
- Coordinates: 28°40′14″N 103°50′40″E
- Country: People's Republic of China
- Province: Sichuan
- Prefecture-level city: Yibin
- County-level city: Pingshan
- Village-level divisions: 2 residential communities 27 villages
- Elevation: 355 m (1,165 ft)
- Time zone: UTC+8 (China Standard)
- Area code: 0831

Xinshi (Chinese: 新市; pinyin: Xīnshì; lit. 'new city') is a town under the administration of Pingshan County in southeastern Sichuan province, China, located about 31 kilometres (19 mi) west of the county seat on the southern (right) bank of the Min River, across which is Yunnan. As of 2011, it has two residential communities (社区) and 27 villages under its administration.

== See also ==
- List of township-level divisions of Sichuan
