= Zuitou =

Zuitou 嘴头镇
- Town
- Location within China
- Coordinates: 34°3′44″N 107°18′46″E
- Country: China
- Province: Shaanxi
- Prefecture: Baoji
- County: Taibai County

Area
  - Total: 337 km^{2} (130 sq mi)

Population (2010)
  - Total: 26,948
  - Density: 80.0/km^{2} (207/sq mi)
- Time zone: UTC+8 (China Standard)

Zuitou (Chinese: 嘴头镇) is a town in and the county seat of Taibai County of Baoji, Shaanxi, China.
