= Taibaihe =

Taibaihe 太白河镇
- Town
- Location within China
- Coordinates: 33°49′12″N 107°12′23″E
- Country: China
- Province: Shaanxi
- Prefecture: Baoji
- County: Taibai County

Area
  - Total: 245 km^{2} (95 sq mi)

Population (2010)
  - Total: 2,338
  - Density: 9.54/km^{2} (24.7/sq mi)
- Time zone: UTC+8 (China Standard)

Taibaihe (Chinese: 太白河镇) is a town located in Taibai County, Baoji, Shaanxi, China. Per the 2010 census, the town had a population of 2,338.
