= Hetrombopag =

Chemical compound

Hetrombopag INN: Hetrombopag

Clinical data
- Trade names: Hengqu
- Other names: Rafutrombopag olamine; rafutrombopag ethanolamine; hetrombopag; SHR-8735; SHR8735
- Routes of administration: Oral

Legal status
- Legal status: In general: ℞ (Prescription only)

Identifiers
- IUPAC name: 5-[2-Hydroxy-3-[[5-methyl-3-oxo-2-(5,6,7,8-tetrahydronaphthalen-2-yl)-1H-pyrazol-4-yl]diazenyl]phenyl]furan-2-carboxylic acid
- CAS Number: 2600513-51-5 1257792-42-9 (rafutrombopag olamine)
- PubChem CID: 135565610
- IUPHAR/BPS: 10657
- DrugBank: DB16184
- ChemSpider: 52084807
- UNII: 9WGT51BDDL
- ChEMBL: ChEMBL4594401

Chemical and physical data
- Formula: C_{25}H_{22}N_{4}O_{5}
- Molar mass: 458.474 g·mol^{−1}
- 3D model (JSmol): Interactive image
- SMILES: CC1=C(C(=O)N(N1)C2=CC3=C(CCCC3)C=C2)N=NC4=CC=CC(=C4O)C5=CC=C(O5)C(=O)O
- InChI: InChI=InChI=1S/C25H22N4O5/c1-14-22(24(31)29(28-14)17-10-9-15-5-2-3-6-16(15)13-17)27-26-19-8-4-7-18(23(19)30)20-11-12-21(34-20)25(32)33/h4,7-13,28,30H,2-3,5-6H2,1H3,(H,32,33); Key:YATJUTCKRWETAB-UHFFFAOYSA-N

Hetrombopag (also known as rafutrombopag; trade name Hengqu) is a pharmaceutical drug for the treatment of thrombocytopenia and anemia.

It is a non-peptide small‐molecule thrombopoietin receptor agonist.

In China, it is approved for second-line treatment for primary immune thrombocytopenic purpura (ITP) and severe aplastic anemia (SAA) in adults.
