= Yintai District =

Yintai 印台区
- District
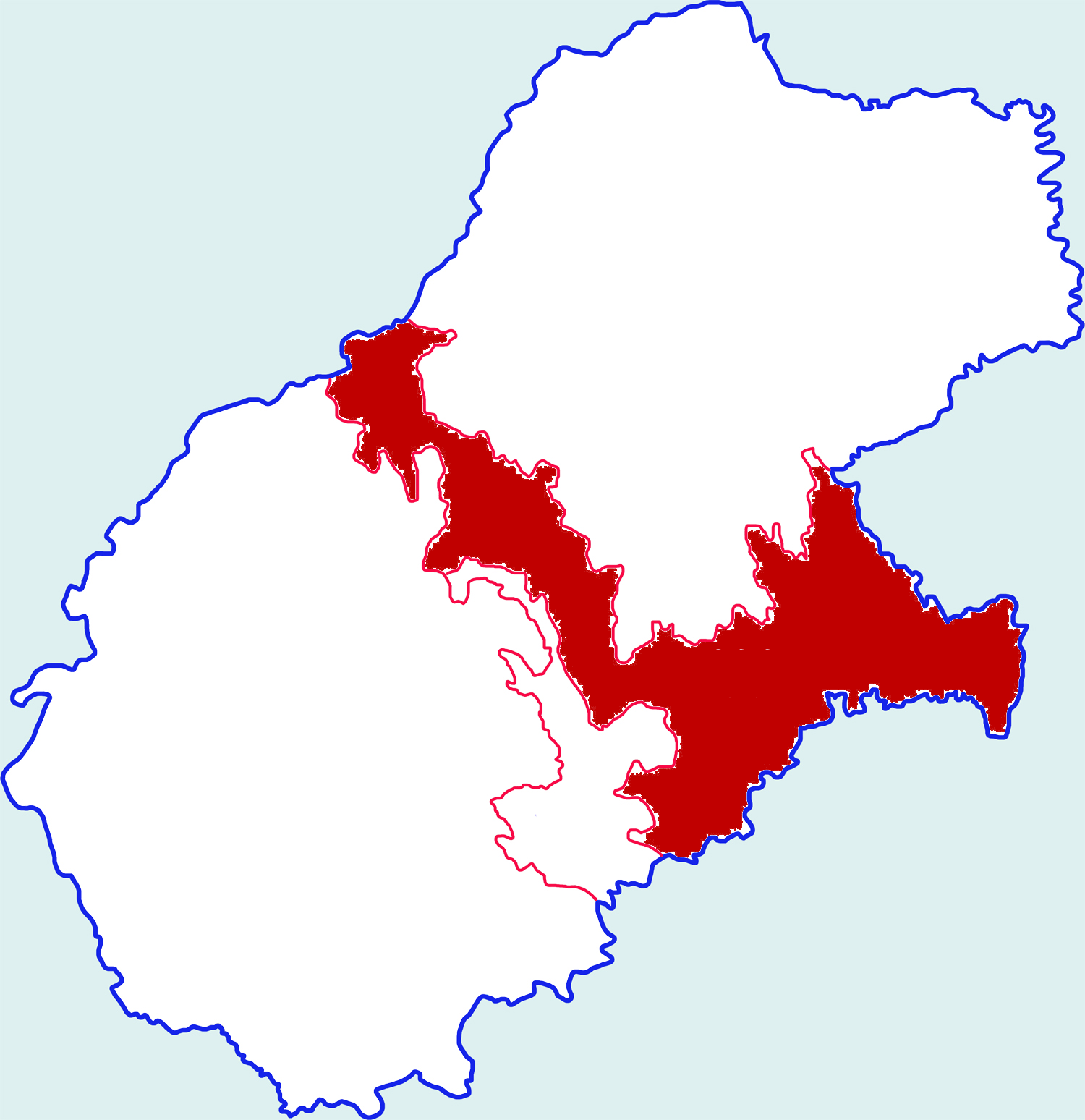
- Yintai in Tongchuan
- Coordinates: 35°7′N 109°6′E
- Country: People's Republic of China
- Province: Shaanxi

Area
  - Total: 627 km^{2} (242 sq mi)

Population (2002)
  - Total: 230,000
  - Density: 370/km^{2} (950/sq mi)
- Time zone: UTC+8 (China standard time)

Yintai District (Chinese: 印台区; pinyin: Yìntái Qū) is a district under the administration of Tongchuan city in Shaanxi province of the People's Republic of China. Its area is 627 square kilometers, with a population of approximately 230,000 people as of 2002.

== Administrative divisions ==
Yintai District administers two neighbourhoods, seven towns, and three rural townships. The neighbourhoods are Chengguan and Sanlidong. The towns are Yuhua, Jinsuoguan, Wangshiwa, Hongtu, Azhuang, Guangyang, and Chenlu. The rural townships are Yintai, Xiaojiabao, and Gaolouhe.
