= Xi'an Polytechnic University =

University in Xi'an, China

- 西安工程大学
- Type: Public Polytechnic
- Established: 1912
- Chairman: Liu Jiangnan (刘江南)
- Chancellor: Gao Yong (高勇)
- Academic staff: 1,565
- Students: ~24,000
- Location: 19 South Jinhua St., Xi'an, China, Xi'an, Shaanxi, China; 32°15′32″N 108°59′32″E
- Campus: 1,500 mu (2.25 km², 556 acres)
- Website: www.xpu.edu.cn

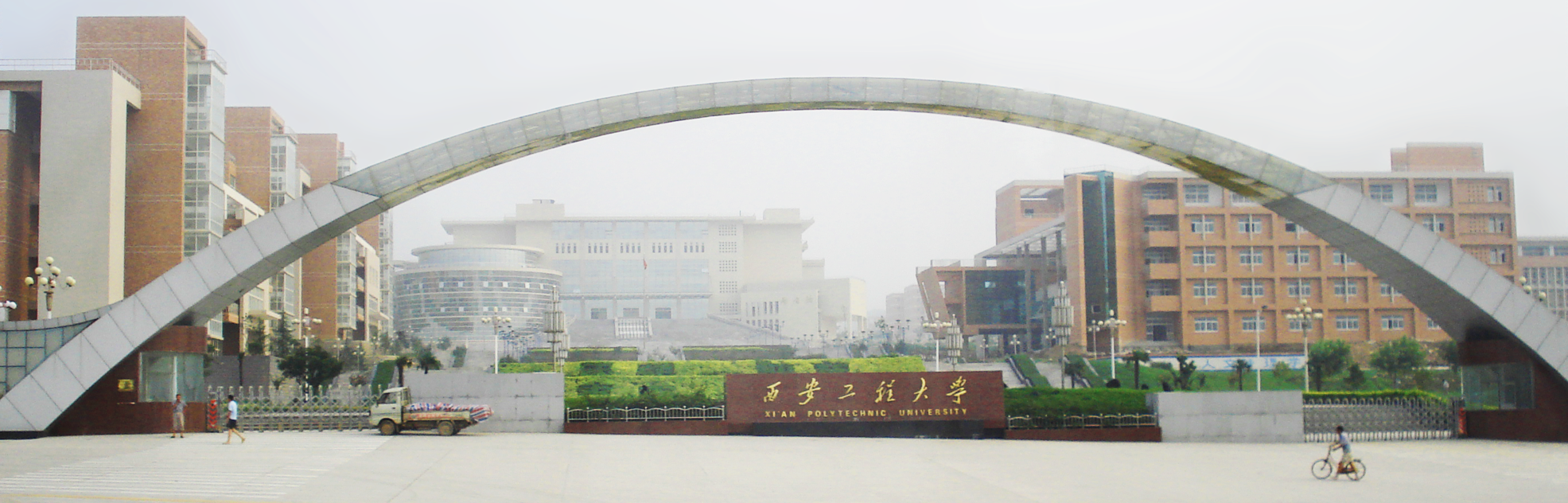
Main gate of the university

Xi'an Polytechnic University (Chinese: 西安工程大学; pinyin: Xī'ān Gōngchéng Dàxué) is a college located in Xi'an, in the Shaanxi province, China.

== History ==
Xi'an Polytechnic University enjoys a long history which can be traced back to 1912 when it was the Weaving Division of the Beijing Higher Industrial School. The school was approved in 1978 to set up the Northwest Textile Institute, one of the three national institutions controlled directly by the national Ministry of Textiles. In 1998, control transferred to the Shaanxi Province Ministry of Education. In 2001, the school changed its name to Xi'an Institute of Engineering and Technology, then changed to Xi'an Polytechnic University in 2006.

XPU is a large-scale university with 10 colleges and 2 teaching departments, with over 24,000 students. There are 2 campuses, covering an area of 1,080,000 square meters.
