= Xinshi Subdistrict, Xi'an =

Xinshi Subdistrict 新市街道
- Subdistrict
- Xinshi Subdistrict in China
- Coordinates: 34°32′14″N 109°10′59″E
- Country: People's Republic of China
- Province: Shaanxi
- Sub-provincial city: Xi'an
- District: Lintong
- Village-level divisions: 1 residential community 11 villages
- Elevation: 369 m (1,211 ft)
- Time zone: UTC+8 (China Standard)
- Area code: 0029

Xinshi Subdistrict (Chinese: 新市街道; pinyin: Xīnshì Jiēdào; lit. 'new city') is a subdistrict of Lintong District in the northeastern suburbs of Xi'an, located 18 kilometres (11 mi) north-northeast of downtown Lintong. As of 2011, it has one residential communities (社区) and 11 villages under its administration.
