= Shennong, Shaanxi =

Shennong 神农镇
- Town
- Location in China
- Coordinates: 34°20′24″N 107°6′49″E
- Country: People's Republic of China
- Province: Shaanxi
- Prefecture-level city: Baoji
- District: Weibin District
- Time zone: UTC+8 (China Standard)

Shennong (simplified Chinese: 神农; traditional Chinese: 神農; pinyin: Shénnóng) is a town under the administration of Weibin District, Baoji, Shaanxi, China. As of 2023, it administers Chenjia Residential Community (陈家社区), Jiangchengbao Residential Community (姜城堡社区), and the following eleven villages:

- Dawanpu Village (大湾铺村)
- Taipingzhuang Village (太平庄村)
- Zhuyuangou Village (竹园沟村)
- Shaojiashan Village (邵家山村)
- Yimenbao Village (益门堡村)
- Rujiazhuang Village (茹家庄村)
- Xiayahe Village (夏砑壑村)
- Fengjiayuan Village (冯家塬村)
- Yuquan Village (峪泉村)
- Renjiawan Village (任家湾村)
- Dasanguan Village (大散关村)
