= Baotashan Subdistrict =

Baotashan Subdistrict 宝塔山街道
- Subdistrict
- Location within China
- Coordinates: 36°36′01″N 109°29′32″E
- Country: People's Republic of China
- Province: Shaanxi
- Prefecture-level city: Yan'an
- District: Baota District

Population (2010)
  - Total: 67,388

Baotashan Subdistrict (simplified Chinese: 宝塔山街道; traditional Chinese: 寶塔山街道; pinyin: Bǎotǎshān Jiēdào) is a subdistrict in Baota District, Yan'an, Shaanxi Province, China. The subdistrict spans an area of 26.9 square kilometres (10.4 sq mi), and had a population of 67,388 as of 2010.

== Geography ==
Baotashan Subdistrict is located within Baota District, along the shore of the Yan River. The subdistrict is bordered by Qiaogou Subdistrict to the east, Nanshi Subdistrict to the south, Fenghuangshan Subdistrict to the west, and Hezhuangping and Zaoyuan Subdistrict to the north.

== Administrative divisions ==
Baotashan Subdistrict is divided into 7 residential communities:

Yangjialing Residential Community (杨家岭社区), Wangjiaping Residential Community (王家坪社区), Dongguan Street Residential Community (东关街社区), Dongfeng Residential Community (东风社区), Xiangyang Residential Community (向阳社区), Dongyuan Residential Community (东苑社区), and Baotashan Residential Community (宝塔山社区).

== See also ==
- List of township-level divisions of Shaanxi
