= Liqu =

Liqu 李渠镇
- Town
- Location within China
- Coordinates: 36°40′17″N 109°36′23″E
- Country: China
- Province: Shaanxi
- Prefecture-level city: Yan'an
- District: Baota District

Area
  - Total: 136 km^{2} (53 sq mi)

Population (2010)
  - Total: 21,167
  - Density: 156/km^{2} (403/sq mi)

Liqu (simplified Chinese: 李渠镇; traditional Chinese: 李渠鎮; pinyin: Lǐqú Zhèn) is a town in Baota District, Yan'an, Shaanxi, China. Liqu is located in the northeast of central Baota District, bordered by Fengzhuang Township to its north, Chuankou to its south, Yaodian to its east, and Qiaogou Subdistrict to its west. The town spans an area of 136 square kilometres (53 mi^{2}), and has a population of 21,167 according to the 2010 Chinese census.

== History ==
After Liu Bobo established the Great Xia dynasty in 407 CE, he built the ancient city of Fenglin (simplified Chinese: 丰林; traditional Chinese: 豐林; pinyin: Fēnglín), which was located in present-day Zhoujiawan Village (Chinese: 周家湾村) in Liqu. Fenglin's location, on a mountainous terrace north of the Yan River, made the city easy to defend. Fenglin was a Walled City, and the city's walls were approximately 9 metres (30 ft) high and anywhere between 3 centimetres (1.2 in) to 30 centimetres (12 in) thick. Song dynasty scientist Shen Kuo called the city as dense as a stone, and noted how difficult it would be to attack the city. The city was colloquially known as Helian City (simplified Chinese: 赫连城; traditional Chinese: 赫連城; pinyin: Hèlián chéng), after Liu Bobo's alternative name Helian Bobo. In 577 CE, Fenglin County (simplified Chinese: 丰林县; traditional Chinese: 豐林縣; pinyin: Fēnglín Xiàn) was established, and was seated in the city of Fenglin. Song dynasty general Di Qing once renovated it. The county existed intermittently until 1072, when it was abolished by Emperor Shenzong of Song and demoted to a town. Today, the site of Fenglin is used as farmland.

In 1972 the people's communes of Liqu and Nianzhuang (Chinese: 碾庄) were established. In 1984, the people's communes were abolished, and Liqu was re-established as a town, and Nianzhuang was re-established as a township.

By 1996, Liqu spanned an area of 82 square kilometres (32 mi^{2}), and had a population of approximately 16,000. That same year, Nianzhuang Township had a total area of 54 square kilometres (21 mi^{2}), and a population of about 5,000.

In 2001, Nianzhuang Township was merged into Liqu.

== Geography ==
Liqu is located in the northeast of central Baota District, bordered by Fengzhuang Township to its north, Chuankou to its south, Yaodian to its east, and Qiaogou Subdistrict to its west.

The Yan River flows through the town.

From the mid-1980s throughout the 2010s, there was an increase in forested land throughout much of rural Liqu, largely driven by a decrease in cropland, which itself is a product of a decrease in the area's rural working-age population.

== Administrative divisions ==
Liqu administers 2 residential communities and 24 administrative villages.

=== Residential communities ===
The town's 2 residential communities are as follows:

- Jingqu Community (Chinese: 井渠社区)
- Yangshan Community (Chinese: 阳山社区)

=== Administrative villages ===
The town's 24 administrative villages are as follows:

- Dongcun Village (Chinese: 东村村; lit. 'east village')
- Xicun Village (Chinese: 西村村; lit. 'west village')
- Zhoujiawan Village (Chinese: 周家湾村)
- Chaiya Village (Chinese: 柴崖村)
- Miaogou Village (Chinese: 庙沟村)
- Gaomaowan Village (Chinese: 高峁湾村)
- Zhujiagou Village (Chinese: 朱家沟村)
- Yaliping Village (Chinese: 崖里坪村)
- Goumen Village (Chinese: 沟门村)
- Yangshan Village (Chinese: 阳山村)
- Zhangzhuang Village (Chinese: 张庄村)
- Zhongzhuang Village (Chinese: 中庄村)
- Lijiagou Village (Chinese: 李家沟村)
- Wangzhuang Village (Chinese: 王庄村)
- Caojiagou Village (Chinese: 曹家沟村)
- Hujiapo Village (Chinese: 呼家坡村)
- Lijiagou Village (Chinese: 刘家沟村)
- Shagelao Village (Chinese: 沙圪崂村)
- Nianzhuang Village (Chinese: 碾庄村)
- Yangxingzhuang Village (Chinese: 杨兴庄村)
- Liuzhuang Village (Chinese: 刘庄村)
- Wangjiabian Village (Chinese: 王家砭村)
- Shuangtian Village (Chinese: 双田村)
- Zhangxingzhuang Village (Chinese: 张兴庄村)

== Demographics ==
According to the 2010 Chinese census, Liqu has a population of 21,167.

A 2008 survey put the town's population at about 28,000 residents living in 5,360 households. Of this, 16,863 people lived in 4,110 agricultural households, 6,158 people lived in 1,328 non-agricultural households, and 4,979 or so people were found to be temporary residents.

The 2000 Chinese census recorded a population of 17,343 in the town.

A 1996 estimate put Liqu's population at approximately 16,000. Nianzhuang Township (Chinese: 碾庄乡), which would be merged into Liqu in 2001, had a population of about 5,000 in 1996, giving the combined area a total population of about 21,000.

== Economy ==
Through the 1990s into the 21st century, as China's economy grew rapidly, an increasing amount of Liqu's residents migrated elsewhere for work, particularly younger working-age people. Income for those who work in Liqu is generally lower than for those who migrate elsewhere.

Beginning in the late 20th century, local agriculture began to shift from primarily Vegetables, and towards increased maize growing.

== Transportation ==
The Shenmu–Yan'an railway passes through Liqu. Yan'an North railway station is located in the town.

National Highway 210 also passes through Liqu.

The town was located 1.5 kilometres (0.93 mi) away from the now-defunct Yan'an Ershilipu Airport. The region is now served by Yan'an Nanniwan Airport.

== See also ==
- Baota District
- China National Highway 210
- List of township-level divisions of Shaanxi
- Shenmu–Yan'an railway
- Towns of China
- Yan River
- Yan'an
