= Qiaogou Subdistrict =

Qiaogou Subdistrict 桥沟街道
- Subdistrict
- Location within China
- Coordinates: 36°37′26″N 109°31′29″E
- Country: China
- Province: Shaanxi
- Prefecture-level city: Yan'an
- District: Baota District

Area
  - Total: 110.85 km^{2} (42.80 sq mi)

Population (2010)
  - Total: 69,345
  - Density: 625.58/km^{2} (1,620.2/sq mi)

Qiaogou Subdistrict (simplified Chinese: 桥沟街道; traditional Chinese: 橋溝街道; pinyin: Qiáogōu Jiēdào) is a subdistrict in Baota District, Yan'an, Shaanxi Province, China. The subdistrict spans an area of 110.85 square kilometres (42.80 mi^{2}), and has a population of 69,345 as of 2010.

== History ==
The Qiao'ergou Catholic Church was built in present-day Qiaogou Subdistrict in 1934. Shortly after its construction, it began to host the Central Party School of the Chinese Communist Party. In 1938, the sixth plenary session of the 6th Central Committee of the Chinese Communist Party happened at the church.

Qiaogou as an administrative unit dates back to 1972, when the Qiao'ergou People's Commune (simplified Chinese: 桥儿沟公社; traditional Chinese: 橋兒溝公社; pinyin: Qiáo'ergōu Gōngshè) was established.

Qiao'ergou was changed to a township in 1984, when people's communes were abolished in China.

In 1998, Qiao'ergou Township was upgraded to become a town, and its name was changed to Qiaogou (simplified Chinese: 桥沟; traditional Chinese: 橋溝).

In 2015, Qiaogou was upgraded from a town to a subdistrict.

== Geography ==
Qiaogou Subdistrict is located in the central western portion of Baota District, near the urban core of Yan'an. The subdistrict is adjacent to Liqu to the east, Liulin to the south, and both Zaoyuan Subdistrict and Hezhuangping to the northwest. The subdistrict has an average elevation of 957.6 metres (3,142 ft) above sea level. The Yan River flows through the subdistrict.

== Administrative divisions ==
Qiaogou Subdistrict has jurisdiction over 6 residential communities and 15 administrative villages.

- Xiangyang Community (Chinese: 向阳社区)
- Dongyuan Community (Chinese: 东苑社区)
- Ershilipu Community (Chinese: 二十里铺社区)
- Luojiaping Community (Chinese: 罗家坪社区)
- Fangta Community (Chinese: 方塔社区)
- Qiaogou Community (Chinese: 桥沟社区)
- Yinjiagou Village (Chinese: 尹家沟村)
- Luojiaping Village (Chinese: 罗家坪村)
- Liushudian Village (Chinese: 柳树店村)
- Wangchagou Village (Chinese: 王岔沟村)
- Yandonggou Village (Chinese: 烟洞沟村)
- Liuwanjiagou Village (Chinese: 刘万家沟村)
- Ershilipu Village (Chinese: 二十里铺村)
- Shilipu Village (Chinese: 十里铺村)
- Qiaogou Village (Chinese: 桥沟村)
- Dongsheng Village (Chinese: 东胜村)
- Nanzhaibian Village (Chinese: 南寨砭村)
- Zezigou Village (Chinese: 泽子沟村)
- Fangta Village (Chinese: 方塔村)
- Renjiayaoce Village (Chinese: 任家窑则村)
- Zhujiawa Village (Chinese: 朱家洼村)

== Transportation ==
National Highway 210 passes through Qiaogou Subdistrict.

== Attractions ==
Attractions within Qiaogou Subdistrict include Wangjiaping Memorial Hall (Chinese: 王家坪纪念馆), the Yangjialing Revolutionary Site (Chinese: 杨家岭革命旧址), the Qiaogou Lu Xun Art School Site (Chinese: 桥沟鲁迅艺术学校旧址, predecessor of modern Lu Xun Academy of Fine Arts), and Du Fu Temple (Chinese: 杜甫祠).

== See also ==
- List of township-level divisions of Shaanxi
- Qiao'ergou Catholic Church
