= Madongchuan =

Madongchuan 麻洞川镇
- Town
- Location within China
- Coordinates: 36°23′17″N 109°48′53″E
- Country: China
- Province: Shaanxi
- Prefecture-level city: Yan'an
- District: Baota District

Area
  - Total: 252.73 km^{2} (97.58 sq mi)

Population (2010)
  - Total: 6,544
  - Density: 25.89/km^{2} (67.06/sq mi)

Madongchuan (simplified Chinese: 麻洞川镇; traditional Chinese: 麻洞川鎮; pinyin: Mádòngchuān Zhèn) is a town in Baota District, Yan'an, Shaanxi, China. The town spans an area of 252.73 square kilometres (97.58 mi^{2}), and has a population of 6,544 as of 2010.

== History ==
Manmade grottoes dating back to the Song dynasty have been found in Madongchuan. The Shiyaowan Grotto (Chinese: 石窑湾石窟; pinyin: Shíyáowān Shíkū) contains a number of Buddha statues (many of which have now been partially or completed destroyed), and inscriptions dating back to the late 11th century.

On the evening of February 18, 1935, as part of the Chinese Civil War, forces of the Chinese Red Army clashed with 50 Mintuan soldiers, aligned with Chiang Kai-Shek's Nationalist government, in the village of Jinpenwan (Chinese: 金盆湾村). Red Army forces won the battle. Later in the Civil War, on May 11, 1947, Communist Party forces, now reorganized as the People's Liberation Army, clashed with Chiang's Nationalist Army again in Jinpenwan. Forces of the People's Liberation Army, led by Yan Kuiyao, won the battle, and effectively captured the village. On November 14 and November 15 later that year, Nationalist Army aircraft bombed the village.

From May through July 1950, an unidentified illness swept through the village of Jinpenwan, as well as other parts of present-day Baota District, killing 680 people.

Madongchuan was established as a people's commune in 1972. In 1984, it was changed to a township.

== Geography ==
Madongchuan is located in the southeast portion of Baota District, bordered by the town of Lin to its east, Nanniwan and Chuankou to its west, Zhengzhuang in neighboring Yanchang County to its north, and Niuwu in neighboring Fu County to its south. The town is located 65 kilometres (40 mi) from Baota District's urban core.

The Fenchuan River (Chinese: 汾川河; pinyin: Fénchuān Hé), a minor river which flows from Nanniwan to Yichuan County and into the Yellow River, flows through Madongchuan. The Fenchuan Canal (Chinese: 汾川渠; pinyin: Fénchuān Qú), a small canal off the Fenchuan River which irrigates nearby land, flows through Madongchuan, creating the Jinpenwan Reservoir (Chinese: 金盆湾水库; pinyin: Jīnpénwān Shuǐkù). According to 1994 government publication, 62.3% of Madongchuan is forested.

== Administrative divisions ==
Madongchuan administers 10 administrative villages (Chinese: 行政村; pinyin: xíngzhèng cūn), as well as 38 natural villages (Chinese: 自然村; pinyin: zìrán cūn), although the latter lacks any administrative jurisdiction. Madongchuan's government is located in Madongchuan Village (Chinese: 麻洞川村). The town's 10 administrative villages are as follows:

- Madongchuan Village (Chinese: 麻洞川村)
- Jinpenwan Village (Chinese: 金盆湾村)
- Yuetun Village (Chinese: 岳屯村)
- Xueshuiwan Village (Chinese: 雪水湾村)
- Shiyaowan Village (Chinese: 石窑湾村)
- Xicun Village (Chinese: 西村村; lit. 'west village')
- Fancun Village (Chinese: 樊村村)
- Zhaotai Village (Chinese: 赵台村)
- Yaojiapo Village (Chinese: 姚家坡村)
- Quli Village (Chinese: 曲里村)

== Demographics ==
As per the 2010 Chinese Census, Madongchuan has a population of 6,544. This represents a significant decline from the 2000 Chinese Census, when its population totaled 10,416. In 1985, Madongchuan's population totaled 8,405. According to the 1982 Chinese Census, Madongchuan had a population of 8,257, all of whom were classified as ethnically Han Chinese. In the 1982 Census, Madongchuan had an average household size of 4.44 people. As of the 1964 Chinese Census, Madongchuan had a population of 4,241, all of whom were classified as ethnically Han Chinese.

Madongchuan has a recorded hukou population of 11,142 as of 2018.

== Economy ==
Major crops grown in Madongchuan include maize, tobacco, and vegetables.

A small hydropower plant known as the Dongwan Small Hydropower Plant (Chinese: 洞湾小水电站) was built in Madongchuan in 1958, and produces 1,000 Kilowatt-hour of electricity annually.

== Transportation ==
The S303 highway runs through Madongchuan.

== See also ==
- List of township-level divisions of Shaanxi
