= Yan'an Revolutionary Memorial Hall =

State-level museum in China

- 延安革命纪念馆
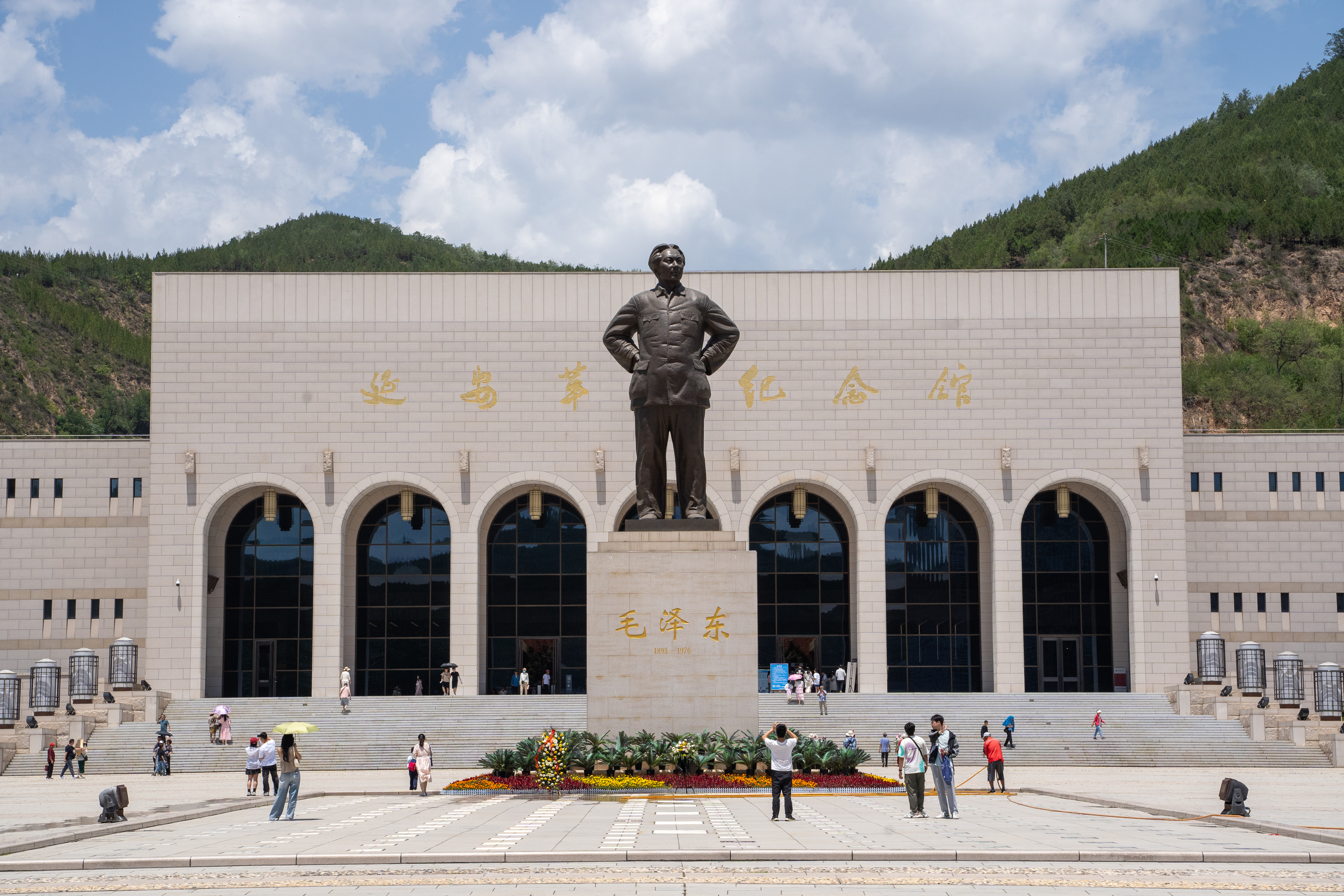
- Statue of Mao Zedong in front of the Memorial Hall
- Established: 1950
- Location: Baota District, Yan'an, Shaanxi Province, China
- Coordinates: 36.6096°N 109.4719°E
- Type: History museum

The Yan'an Revolutionary Memorial Hall is a state-level museum located in the Baota District of Yan'an, Shaanxi Province, China.

The museum was established in 1950 as one of the first revolutionary museums in China after the 1949 victory of the Chinese Communist Party in the Chinese Civil War. The museum is divided into six thematic sections, which cover the 13-year period between 1935 and 1948 when the Chinese Communist Party was based in Yan'an, and the importance of Yan'an in the CCP's road to victory in the Chinese Civil War. The Prefatory Hall contains bronze status of Mao Zedong and other revolutionary leaders including Zhu De and Zhou Enlai. The museum also contains the "New Market" exhibit which is a replica of a commercial street in Yan'an damaged by Japanese bombing.

The museum holds more than 35,000 cultural relics, 5,500 historical photographs, 12,000 volumes of books and material, and more than 100 types of journals and magazines published during the Yan'an period of the CCP.

== Gallery ==
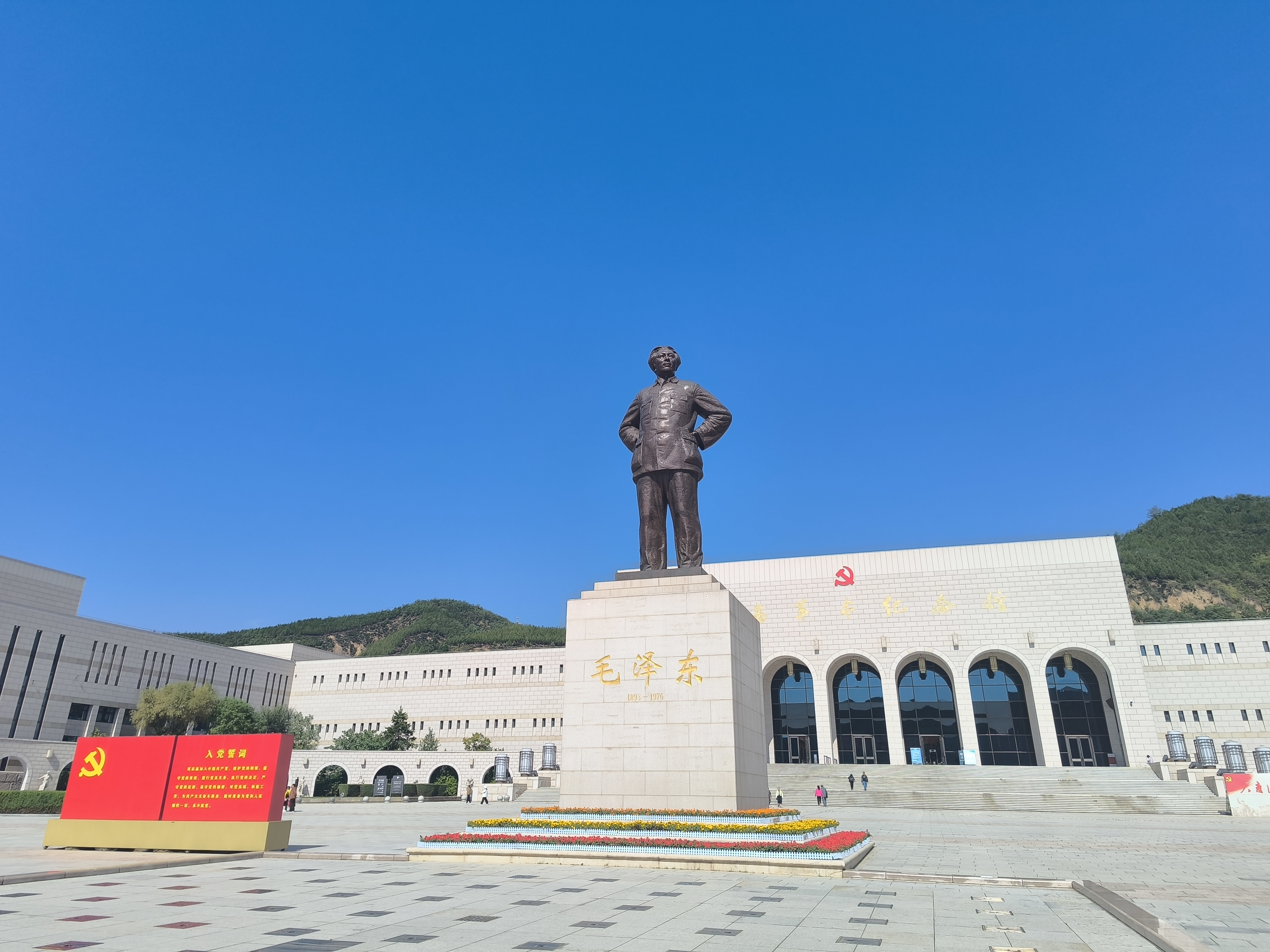

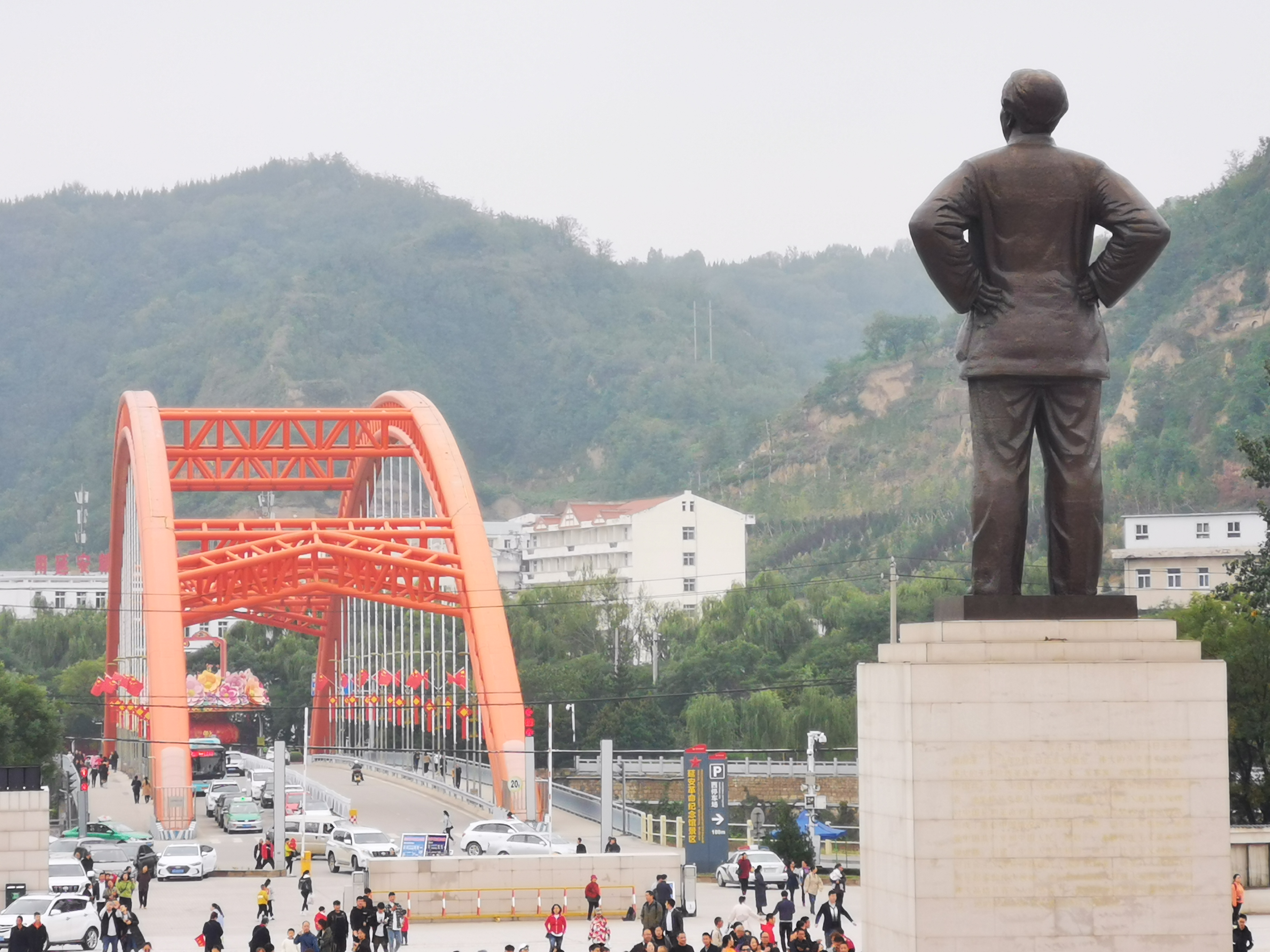

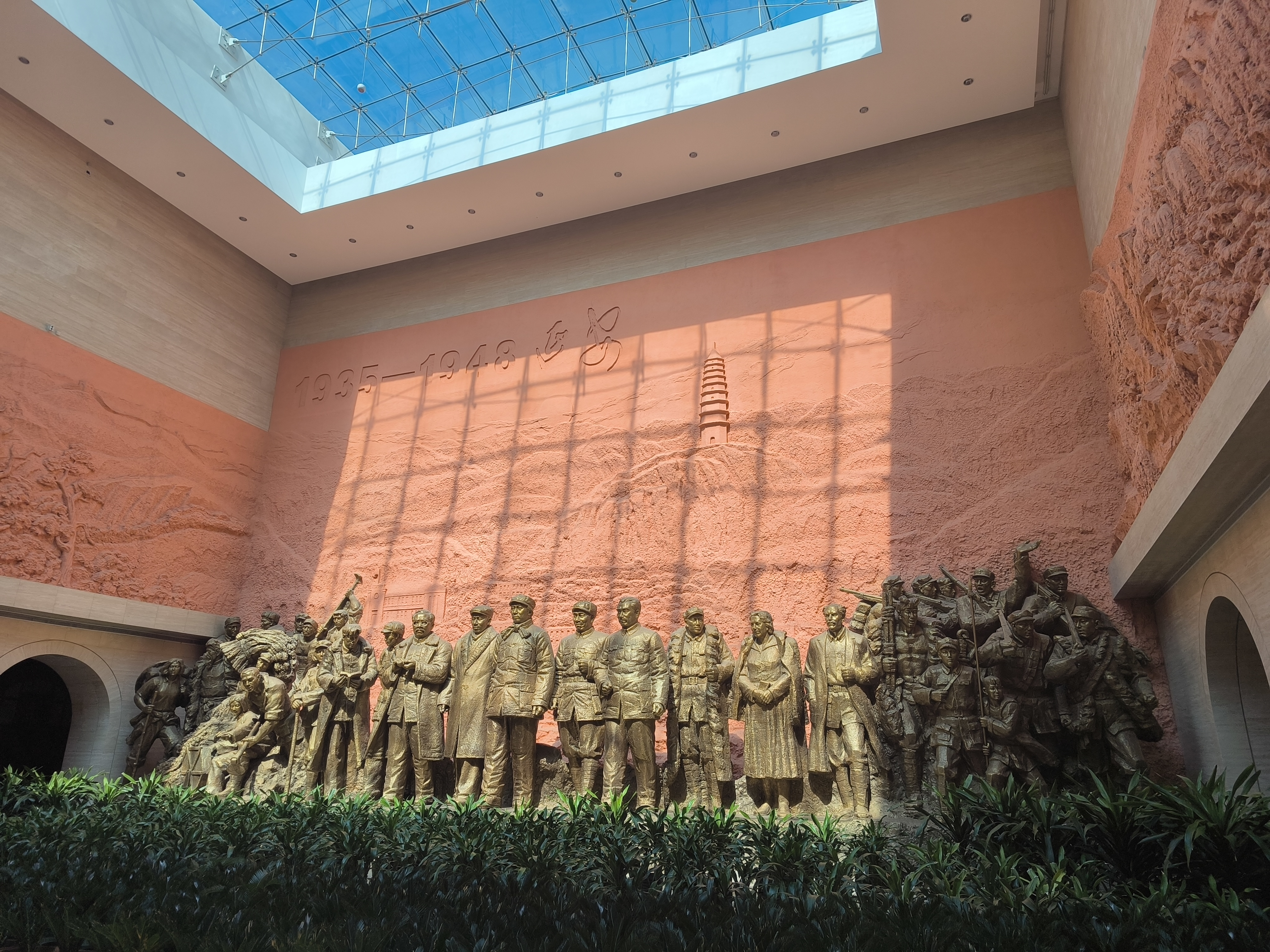
