= Liulin, Baota District =

Liulin 柳林镇
- Town
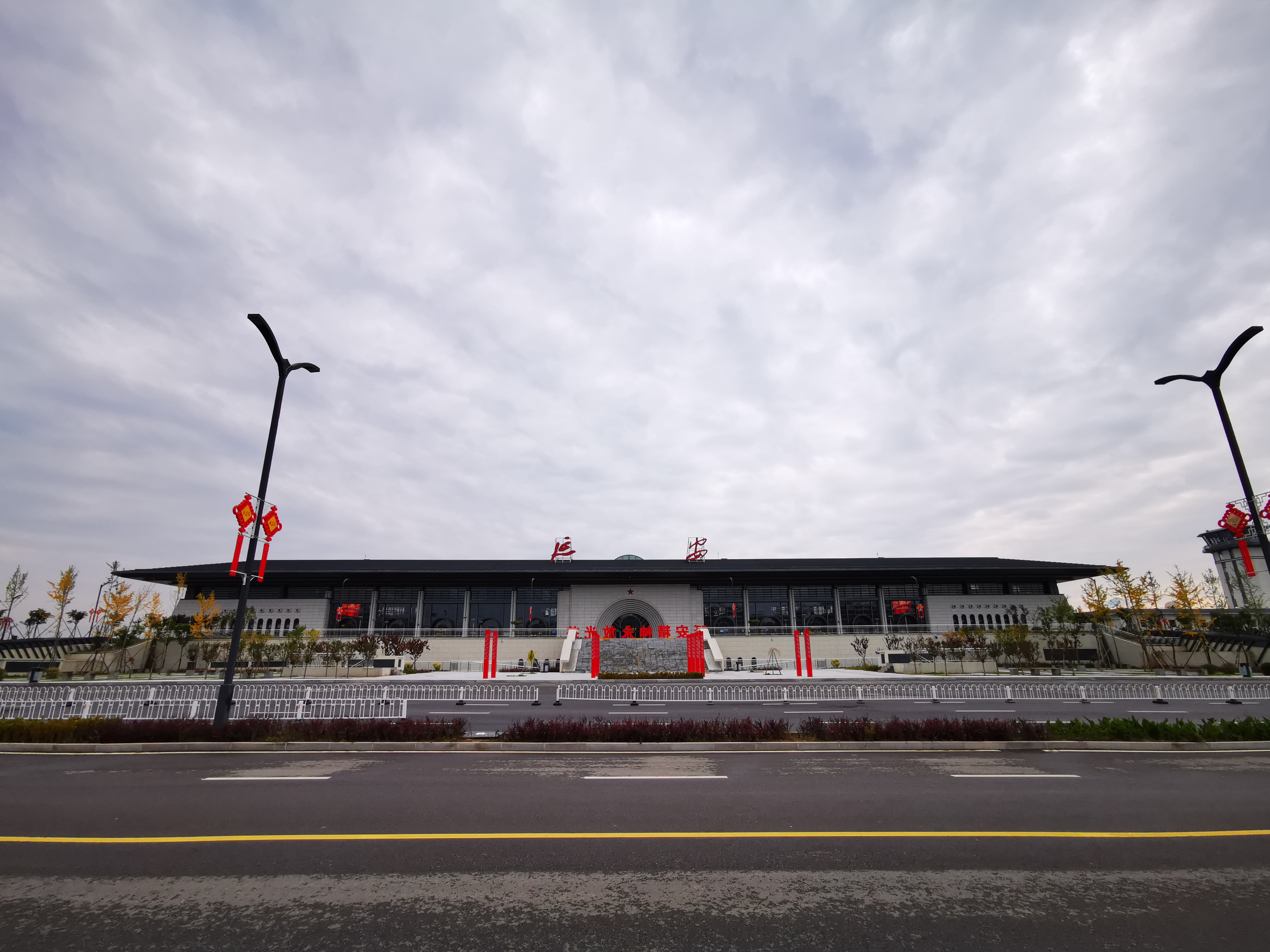
- Yan'an Nanniwan Airport

- Location within China
- Coordinates: 36°32′52″N 109°28′21″E
- Country: China
- Province: Shaanxi
- Prefecture-level city: Yan'an
- District: Baota District

Area
  - Total: 251.00 km^{2} (96.91 sq mi)

Population (2010)
  - Total: 46,991
  - Density: 187.22/km^{2} (484.88/sq mi)

Liulin (simplified Chinese: 柳林镇; traditional Chinese: 柳林鎮; pinyin: Liǔlín Zhèn) is a town in Baota District, Yan'an, Shaanxi province, China. Liulin is located 5 kilometres (3.1 mi) from Yan'an's urban center, and spans an area of 251.00 square kilometres (96.91 sq mi). Liulin has a population of 46,991 according to the 2010 Chinese Census.

== History ==
In 1972, the Liulin People's Commune (Chinese: 柳林公社) was established. In 1984, the Liulin People's Commune was replaced by Liulin Township (Chinese: 柳林乡). Liulin was upgraded to a town in 1998, which it remains today.

== Administrative divisions ==
Liulin administers 5 residential communities and 22 administrative villages.

=== Residential communities ===
Liulin's 5 residential communities are as follows:

- Liulin Community (Chinese: 柳林社区)
- Yangou Community (Chinese: 燕沟社区)
- Nancheng Community (Chinese: 南城社区)
- Hutouyuan Community (Chinese: 虎头园社区)
- Jinyue Community (Chinese: 金岳社区)

=== Administrative villages ===
Liulin's 22 administrative villages are as follows:

- Liulin Village (Chinese: 柳林村)
- Erzhuangke Village (Chinese: 二庄科村)
- Zhaozhuang Village (Chinese: 赵庄村)
- Wuzaoyuan Village (Chinese: 吴枣园村)
- Mata Village (Chinese: 麻塔村)
- Nanzhuanghe Village (Chinese: 南庄河村)
- Shaoyuanliang Village (Chinese: 稍远梁村)
- Hutoumao Village (Chinese: 虎头峁村)
- Wangjiagou Village (Chinese: 王家沟村)
- Shanlangcha Village (Chinese: 山狼岔村)
- Gaopo Village (Chinese: 高坡村)
- Ershilipu Village (Chinese: 二十里铺村)
- Goumen Village (Chinese: 沟门村)
- Huaishuwa Village (Chinese: 槐树洼村)
- Hezhuang Village (Chinese: 何庄村)
- Sanshilipu Village (Chinese: 三十里铺村)
- Rentai Village (Chinese: 仁台村)
- Niuzhuang Village (Chinese: 牛庄村)
- Yuanzhuang Village (Chinese: 元庄村)
- Sishilipu Village (Chinese: 四十铺村)
- Mazhuang Village (Chinese: 麻庄村)
- Kongjiagou Village (Chinese: 孔家沟村)

== Demographics ==
According to the 2010 Chinese Census, Liulin had a population of 46,991. This is an increase from the 24,429 recorded in the 2000 Chinese Census, and a 1996 estimate putting Liulin's population at approximately 12,000.

== Transportation ==
Yan'an Nanniwan Airport, which opened on October 1, 2018, to replace Yan'an Ershilipu Airport, is located in Liulin. As of late 2018, Yan'an Nanniwan has direct flights to Beijing, Xi'an, Chongqing, Guangzhou, Qingdao, Hangzhou, Nanjing, Shenzhen, Haikou, and Tianjin. National Highway 210 runs through Liulin.

== See also ==
- List of township-level divisions of Shaanxi
