= Zhi-Yan dialect =

Jin Chinese dialect of Shaanxi, China

Zhi-Yan
- 志延片
- Native to: China
- Region: Shaanxi
- Language family: Sino-Tibetan: Sinitic; Chinese; Jin; Zhi-Yan
- Writing system: Chinese characters

Language codes
- ISO 639-3: –
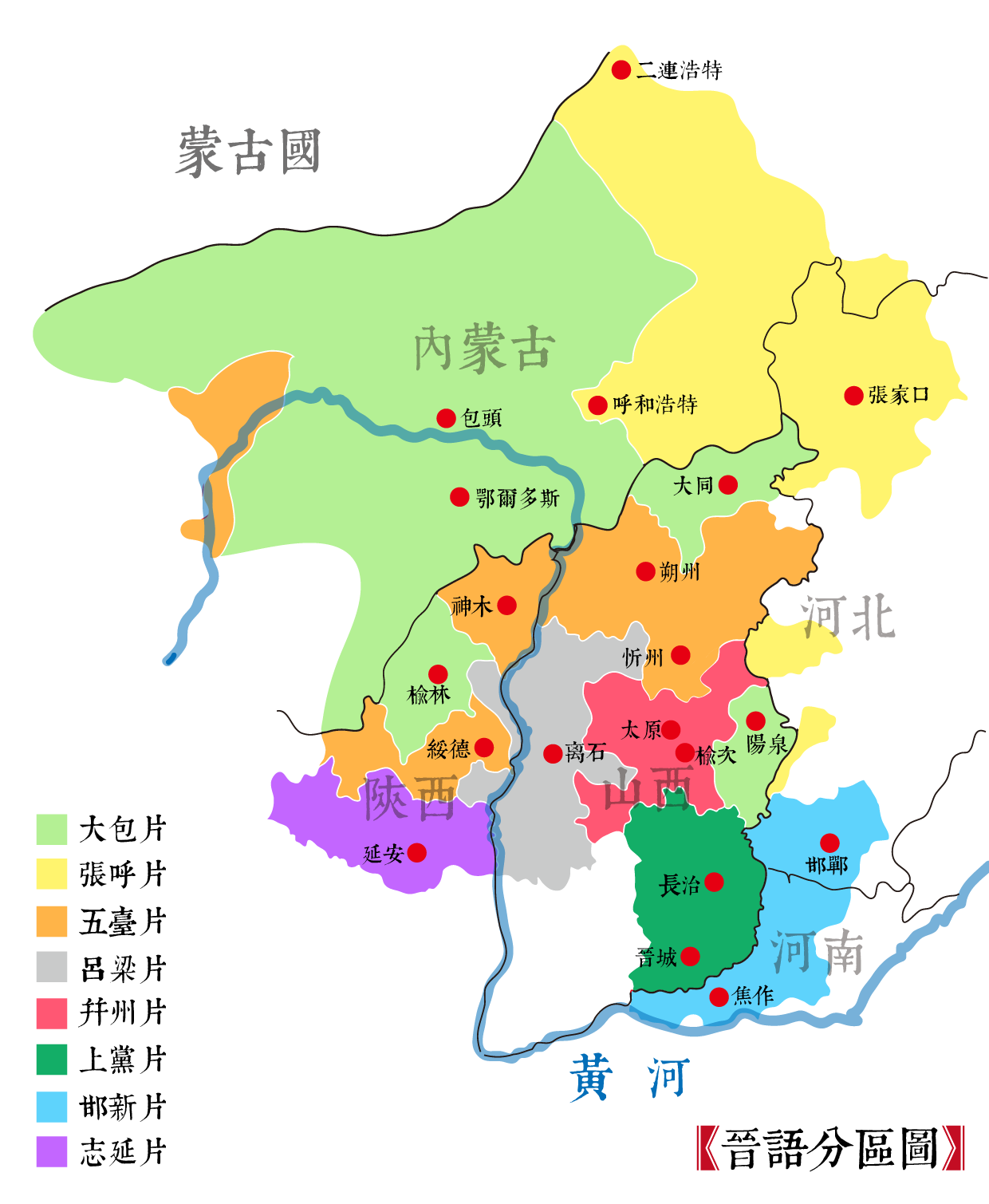
- Distribution of the Zhi-Yan dialect within Jin Chinese (shown in purple)

The Zhi-Yan dialect (Chinese: 志延片; pinyin: Zhìyán piàn; lit. 'Zhidan and Yanchuan variety') is a dialect of Jin Chinese spoken within much of Yan'an, Shaanxi, China. The dialect is spoken throughout Baota District, Zhidan County, and Yanchuan County.

Located in a transition zone between the Jin Chinese of northern Shaanxi and Guanzhong, the Zhi-Yan dialect shows some transitional characteristics in both tones and vocabulary. With the exception of the checked tone, the tones between the Zhi-Yan dialect and the nearby Lüliang dialect are the same. Among ancient checked tone syllables, only fully voiced consonants still retain the checked tone, while clear and sub-voiced syllables are spoken with a high tone (Chinese: 陰平; pinyin: yīnpíng). Most tones are similar to those spoken in Guanzhong. The Zhi-Yan dialect retains checked tones found in northern Shaanxi Jin, but not the checked tones found in Central Plains Mandarin.

The Zhi-Yan dialect was heavily influences by a mass migration of people from nearby Yulin, who moved to Yan'an en masse in the 1930s after a famine struck Yulin. As such, Zhi-Yan speakers descended from those who migrated from Yulin retain characteristics not found in other Zhi-Yan speakers, who share more characteristics with people from Guanzhong.

The Zhi-Yan dialect is spoken in Baota District, Zhidan County and Yanchuan County.
