= Nanshi Subdistrict, Yan'an =

Nanshi Subdistrict 南市街道
- Subdistrict
- Location within China
- Coordinates: 36°34′06″N 109°28′44″E
- Country: China
- Province: Shaanxi
- Prefecture-level city: Yan'an
- District: Baota District

Population (2010)
  - Total: 57,320

Nanshi Subdistrict (Chinese: 南市街道; pinyin: Nánshì Jiēdào) is a subdistrict in Baota District, Yan'an, Shaanxi, China. The subdistrict had a population of 57,320 as of 2010.

== History ==
In 1972, the Nanshi People's Commune (Chinese: 南市公社) was established. In 1984, the Nanshi People's Commune was abolished, and Nanshi Subdistrict was established.

== Demographics ==
According to the 2010 Chinese Census, the subdistrict's population totaled 57,320. In the 2000 Chinese Census, the subdistrict's population was 37,177. In 1996, the subdistrict's estimated population approximated 60,000.

== Administrative divisions ==
As of 2020, the subdistrict administers nine residential communities and two villages.

=== Residential communities ===
The subdistrict's nine residential communities are as follows:

- Qilipu Community (Chinese: 七里铺社区)
- Dufuchuan Community (Chinese: 杜甫川社区)
- Shichanggou Community (Chinese: 市场沟社区)
- Nanqiao Community (Chinese: 南桥社区)
- Majiawan Community (Chinese: 马家湾社区)
- Liangshuijin Community (Chinese: 凉水井社区)
- Nanguan Community (Chinese: 南关社区)
- Huize Community (Chinese: 慧泽社区)
- Baoyuan Community (Chinese: 宝元社区)

=== Villages ===
The subdistrict's two villages are as follows:

- Shichanggou Village (Chinese: 市场沟村)
- Qilipu Village (Chinese: 七里铺村)

== See also ==
- List of township-level divisions of Shaanxi
