= Jing Yuexiu =

Chinese warlord

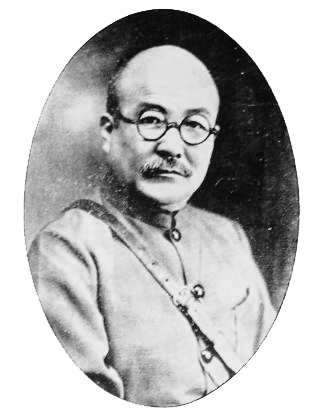
Jing Yuexiu

Jing Yuexiu, 井岳秀, (September 6, 1878 – February 1, 1936) was a warlord from Shaanxi during the Warlord Era. He was born in what is now Tongchuan, Shaanxi on September 6, 1878. His whole life was spent in the army, and he ruled Shaanxi from the city of Yulin for 23 years. He was called "榆林王" or "the Yulin king" because of his major base at Yulin, though he was much more powerful and actually controlled most of Shaanxi for most of his reign. He died of an accidental self-inflicted gunshot wound on February 1, 1936.

== Career ==
Jing Yuexiu joined with other minor warlords in Shaanxi in 1918 to form the jingguojun ("Reverence-the-Republic" Army), and chose as their leader the Shaanxi Kuomintang leader Yu Youren. In 1922, the warlord Liu Zhenhua defeated Yu Youren and took control of Shaanxi, except for isolated corners of the province such as Yulin, where Jing Yuexiu and the remnants of the jingguojun continued in control. In 1924, Sun Yue, a commander of the Guominjun, entered Shaanxi and compelled Liu Zhenhua to submit, while recognizing Jing Yuexiu's authority in the northern part of the province. However, Liu swiftly turned against the Guominjun, leading Jing to cooperate with Guominjun faction leader Feng Yuxiang as he led a successful counterattack into Shaanxi. The new Guominjun-appointed leader of Shaanxi was Song Zheyuan, although Jing's submission to his authority was nominal.
