= Nanniwan, Baota District =

Nanniwan 南泥湾镇
- Town
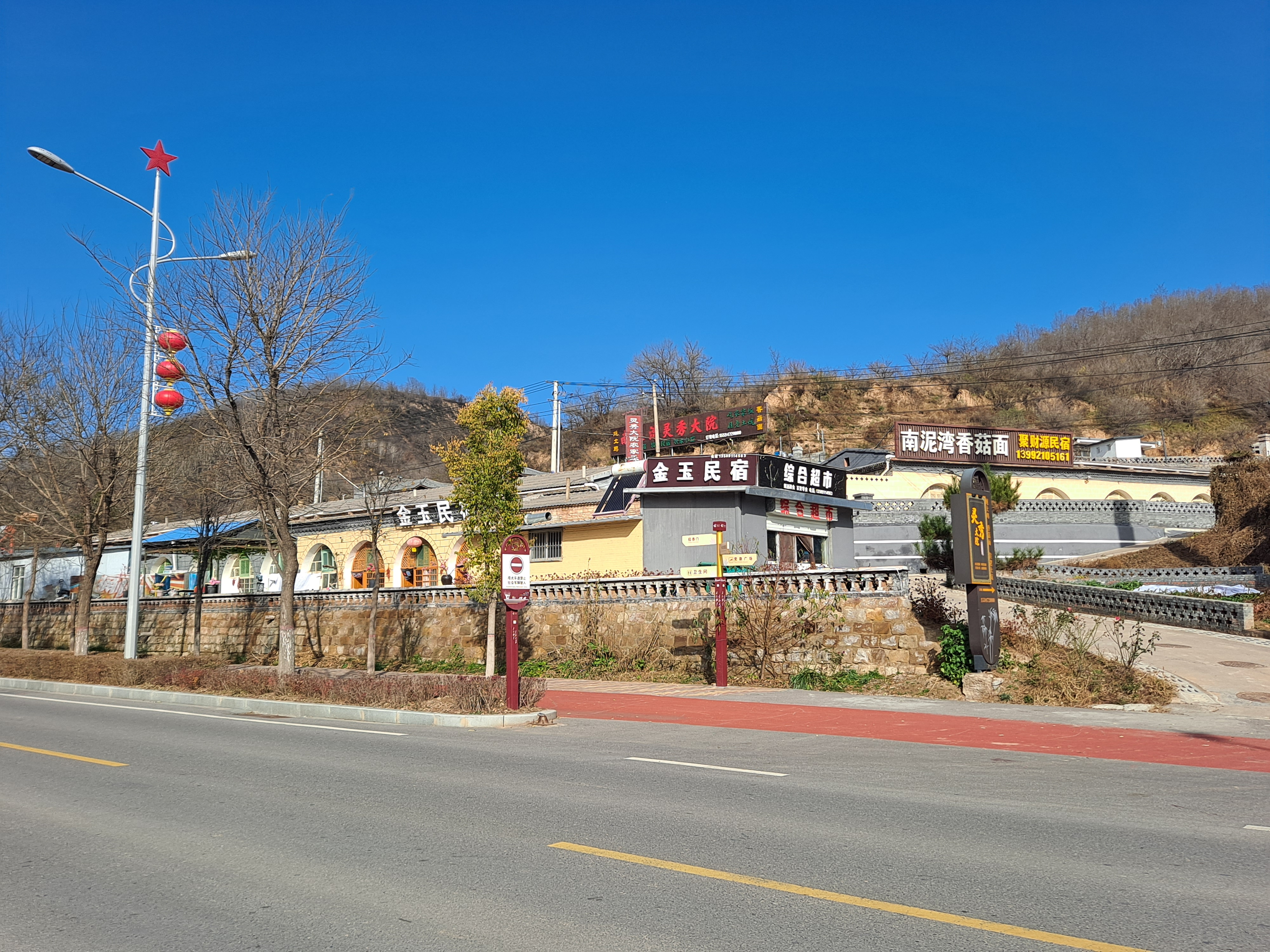

- Location within China
- Coordinates: 36°19′25″N 109°39′08″E
- Country: China
- Province: Shaanxi
- Prefecture-level city: Yan'an
- District: Baota District

Area
  - Total: 513.98 km^{2} (198.45 sq mi)

Population (2015)
  - Total: 15,334
  - Density: 29.834/km^{2} (77.269/sq mi)

Nanniwan (simplified Chinese: 南泥湾镇; traditional Chinese: 南泥灣鎮; pinyin: Nánníwān Zhèn) is a town in Baota District, Yan'an, Shaanxi, China. The town is a significant site for red tourism in China. Nanniwan spans an area of 513.98 square kilometres (198.45 sq mi), and has a population of 15,334 as of 2015.

== History ==
In 1941, the 359th Brigade of the Eighth Route Army arrived in Nanniwan, and established themselves in the town. While stationed in Nanniwan, the brigade created farms, herded livestock, and created an artillery training school.

In 1972, the Nanniwan People's Commune (Chinese: 南泥湾公社) was established. In 1984, the people's commune was abolished, and Nanniwan became a town.

In 2011, Songshulin Township was merged into Nanniwan.

== Administrative divisions ==
Nanniwan governs the following residential community and 12 administrative villages:

- Nanniwan Community (Chinese: 南泥湾社区)
- Panlong Village (Chinese: 盘龙村)
- Taobaoyu Village (Chinese: 桃宝峪村)
- Nanyangfu Village (Chinese: 南阳府村)
- Mafang Village (Chinese: 马坊村)
- Nanniwan Village (Chinese: 南泥湾村)
- Santaizhuang Village (Chinese: 三台庄村)
- Chenzigou Village (Chinese: 陈子沟村)
- Songshulin Village (Chinese: 松树林村)
- Mizhuang Village (Chinese: 米庄村)
- Dengtun Village (Chinese: 邓屯村)
- Jiulongquan Village (Chinese: 九龙泉村)
- Maping Village (Chinese: 马坪村)

== Demographics ==
As of 2018, Nanniwan has a hukou population of 13,264.

A government report in 2015 reported 15,334 living in Nanniwan.

According to the 2010 Chinese Census, Nanniwan had a population of 4,960. Songshulin Township, which was merged into Nanniwan the following year, had a population of 3,138 according to the same census.

According to the 2000 Chinese Census, Nanniwan had a population of 6,518.

A 1996 estimate put Nanniwan's population at about 5,000.

== Economy ==
Nanniwan is a major site for red tourism in China, with approximately 210,000 tourists visiting the town on May Day, 2021, earning the town 12 million renminbi in tourism revenue. However, Nanniwan remains a rural town with relatively low levels of income. A 2015 government report found that 1,041 people in Nanniwan lived in poverty. In an effort to combat the town's low economic development, and improve its touristic development, the town has worked with Yan'an's regional government to shut down oil wells in the town, and restore wetlands and rice paddies. The town's government has also bought farmland from many farmers in the town, and converted it to tourist facilities and parks.

== See also ==
- Nanniwan (song)
- Yan'an Nanniwan Airport
- Yan'an Rectification Movement
- List of township-level divisions of Shaanxi
