= Fenghuangshan Subdistrict, Yan'an =

Fenghuangshan Subdistrict 凤凰山街道
- Subdistrict
- Location within China
- Coordinates: 36°35′48″N 109°28′55″E
- Country: China
- Province: Shaanxi
- Prefecture-level city: Yan'an
- District: Baota District

Population (2010)
  - Total: 44,294

Fenghuangshan Subdistrict (simplified Chinese: 凤凰山街道; traditional Chinese: 鳳凰山街道; pinyin: Fènghuángshān Jiēdào; lit. 'phoenix mountain subdistrict') is a subdistrict in Baota District, Yan'an, Shaanxi, China. As of 2010, the subdistrict has a population of 44,294.

== History ==
The area of contemporary Fenghuangshan Subdistrict is home to a series of centuries old yaodong complexes, most notably, Zhenxilou (Chinese: 镇西楼), which was built into the subdistrict's eponymous Fenghuang Mountain (Chinese: 凤凰山) by Fan Zhongyan during the Northern Song dynasty.

From January 13, 1937 to November 1938, during the Chinese Civil War, the Central Committee of the Chinese Communist Party was based out of the foothills of Fenghuang Mountain.

The division was established as the Fenghuangshan People's Commune (Chinese: 凤凰山公社; pinyin: Fènghuángshān Gōngshè) in March 1972. Fenghuangshan was changed to a subdistrict in September 1984, as people's communes were being phased out.

== Geography ==
Fenghuangshan Subdistrict is located in the northwestern portion of Baota District, where the eponymous Fenghuang Mountain (Chinese: 凤凰山) lies.

== Administrative divisions ==
Fenghuangshan administers seven residential communities (Chinese: 社区; pinyin: Shèqū) and two administrative villages (Chinese: 行政村; pinyin: Xíngzhèng Cūn).

=== Residential communities ===
The subdistrict administers the following seven residential communities:

- Beiyuan Community (Chinese: 北苑社区)
- Wenhuagou Community (Chinese: 文化沟社区)
- Beiguan Street Community (Chinese: 北关街社区)
- Beimenkou Community (Chinese: 北门口社区)
- Fenghuangshan Community (Chinese: 凤凰山社区)
- Zhongxin Street Community (Chinese: 中心街社区)
- Xigou Community (Chinese: 西沟社区)

=== Villages ===
The subdistrict administers the following two administrative villages:

- Wenyi Village (Chinese: 文一村)
- Wen'er Village (Chinese: 文二村)

== Demographics ==
As of the 2010 Chinese census, Fenghuangshan has a population of 44,294, an increase from the 41,194 recorded in the 2000 Chinese census. A 1996 estimate put the subdistrict's population at 29,000. In the 1982 Chinese census, the Fenghuangshan People's Commune had a population of 19,667, comprising 4,312 households.

== See also ==
- List of township-level divisions of Shaanxi
