= Zaoyuan Subdistrict, Yan'an =

Zaoyuan Subdistrict 枣园街道
- Subdistrict
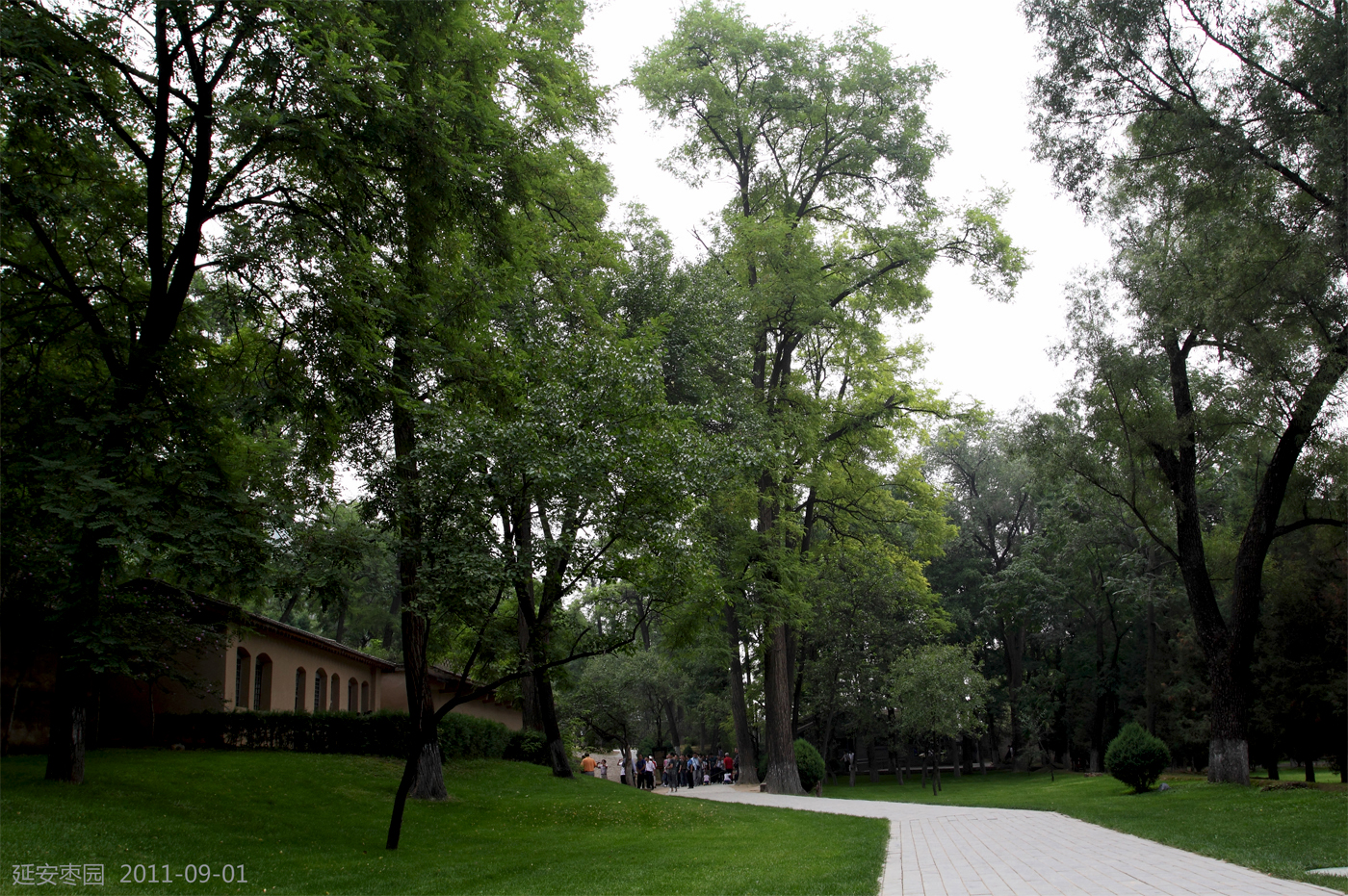

- Location within China
- Coordinates: 36°37′34″N 109°25′17″E
- Country: People's Republic of China
- Province: Shaanxi
- Prefecture-level city: Yan'an
- District: Baota District

Population (2010)
  - Total: 15,835

Zaoyuan Subdistrict (simplified Chinese: 枣园街道; traditional Chinese: 棗園街道; pinyin: Zǎoyuán Jiēdào; lit. 'jujube garden subdistrict') is a subdistrict in Baota District, Yan'an, Shaanxi Province, China. The subdistrict had a population of 15,835 as of 2010.

== History ==
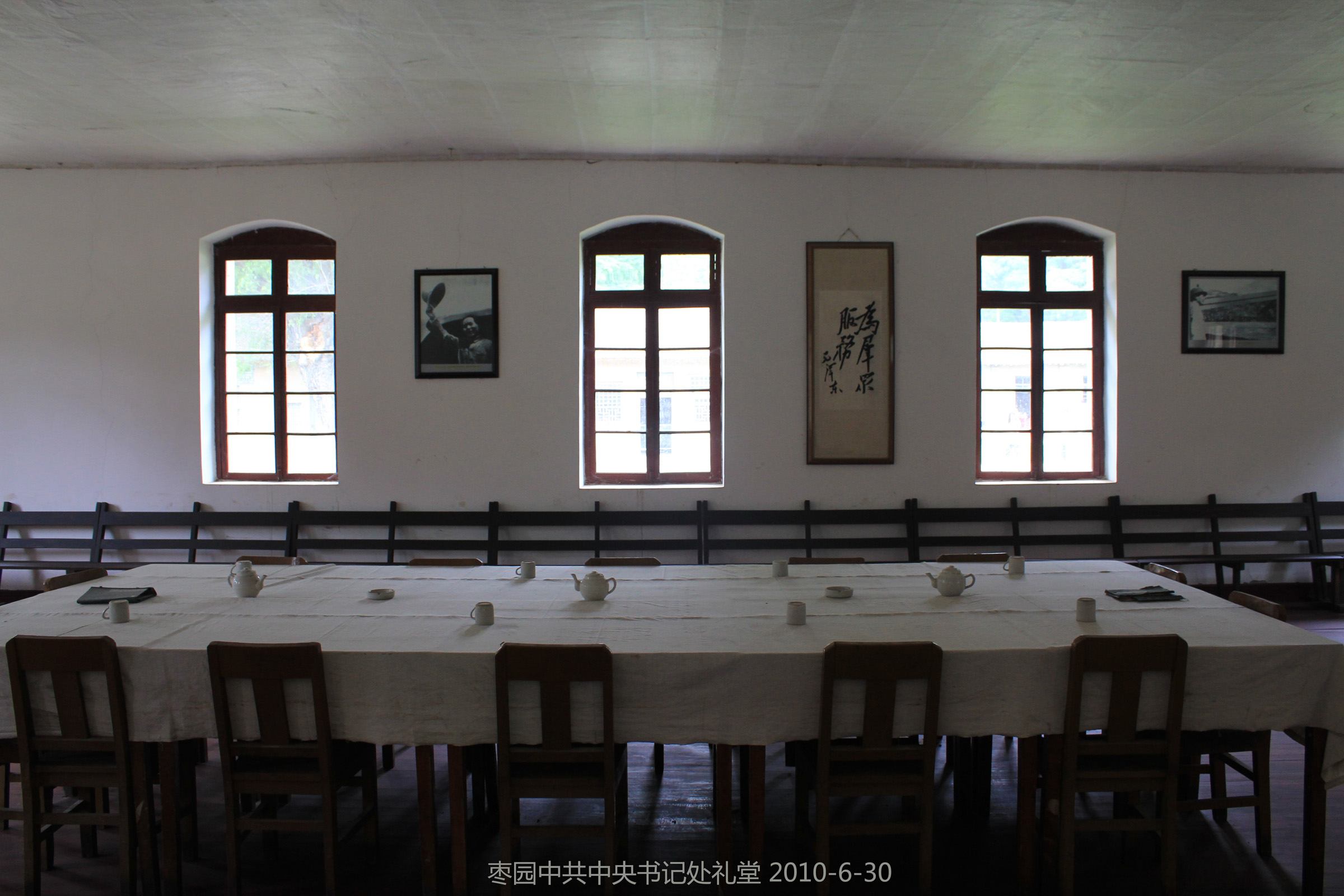
The former site of the Secretariat of the Chinese Communist Party in Zaoyuan

Zaoyuan hosted the Secretariat of the Chinese Communist Party from October 1943 to March 1947.

In 1972, the Zaoyuan People's Commune (simplified Chinese: 枣园公社; traditional Chinese: 棗園公社; pinyin: Zǎoyuán Gōngshè) was established, as part of the nationwide campaign of establishing people's communes. When people's communes were abolished in 1984, Zaoyuan was re-designated as a township.

In 1998, Zaoyuan was upgraded from a township to a town.

In June 2015, the Shaanxi Ministry of Civil Affairs upgraded Zaoyuan from a town to a subdistrict.

== Geography ==
Zaoyuan Subdistrict is located 7.5 kilometres (4.7 mi) to the west of the city center of Yan'an.

== Administrative divisions ==
Zaoyuan Subdistrict administers 2 residential communities (simplified Chinese: 社区; traditional Chinese: 社區; pinyin: Shèqū) and 12 administrative villages (Chinese: 行政村; pinyin: Xíngzhèng Cūn).

- Zaoyuan Community (Chinese: 枣园社区)
- Peizhuang Community (Chinese: 裴庄社区)
- Zaoyuan Village (Chinese: 枣园村)
- Yangya Village (Chinese: 阳崖村)
- Houjiagou Village (Chinese: 候家沟村)
- Peizhuang Village (Chinese: 裴庄村)
- Suancigou Village (Chinese: 酸刺沟村)
- Zhangtianhe Village (Chinese: 张天河村)
- Miaogou Village (Chinese: 庙沟村)
- Mojiawan Village (Chinese: 莫家湾村)
- Shangbiangou Village (Chinese: 上砭沟村)
- Yandianze Village (Chinese: 延店则村)
- Wenjiagou Village (Chinese: 温家沟村)
- Xiabiangou Village (Chinese: 下砭沟村)

== Demographics ==
Per the 2010 Chinese Census, Zaoyuan had a population of 15,835. This is up from the 14,363 recorded in the 2000 Chinese Census, and a 1996 estimate of 7,000.

== Transportation ==
The G65 Baotou–Maoming Expressway runs through the subdistrict, as do Shaanxi Provincial Highways 206 and 303.

== See also ==
- List of township-level divisions of Shaanxi
