= Yan'an Ershilipu Airport =

Chinese airport (1980–2018)

Yan'an Ershilipu Airport 延安二十里堡机场
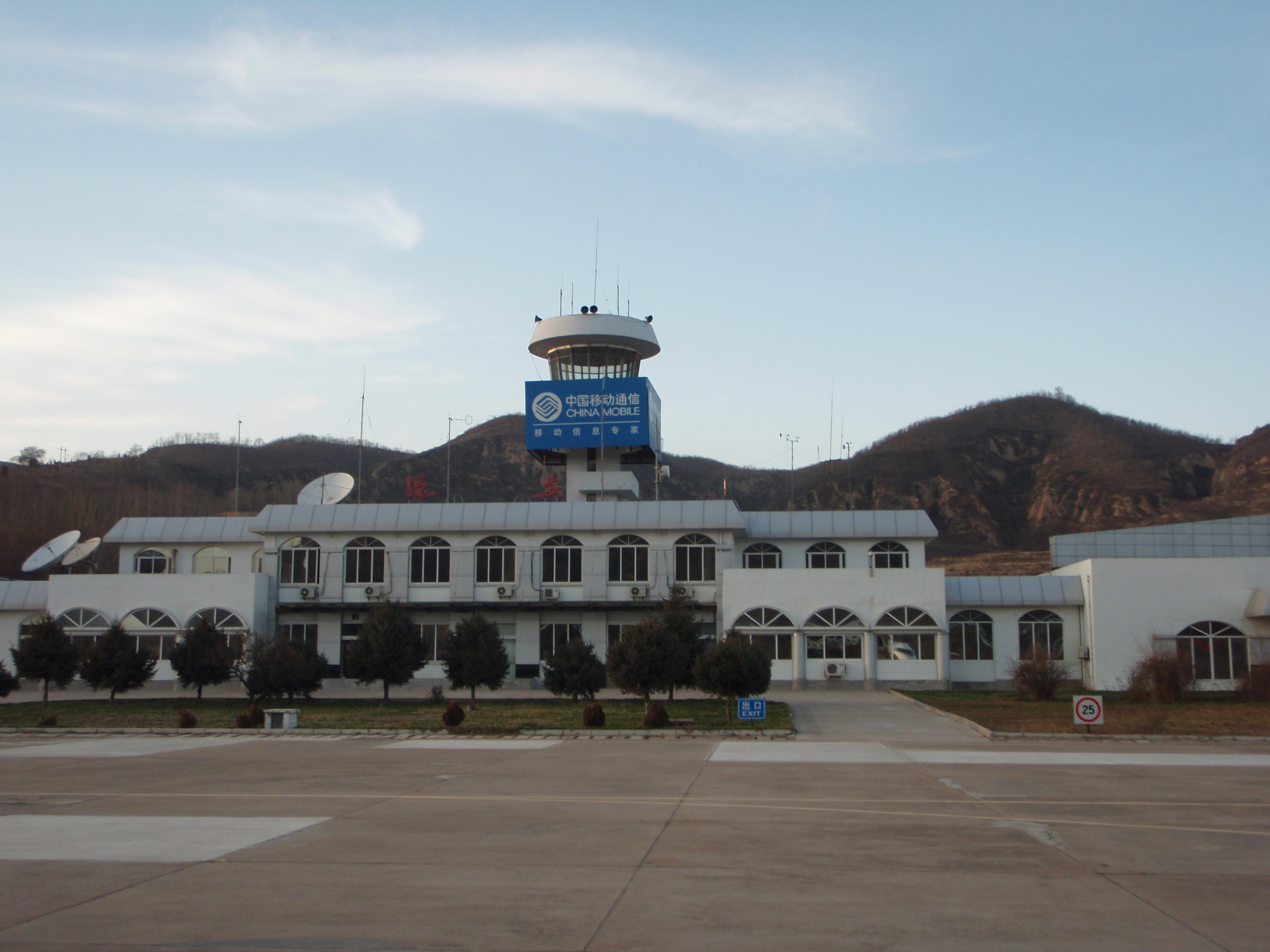
- Terminal
- IATA: ~~ENY~~; ICAO: ~~ZLYA~~

Summary
- Airport type: Military/Public
- Serves: Yan'an, Shaanxi, China
- Elevation AMSL: 945 m / 3,100 ft
- Coordinates: 36°38′13″N 109°33′14″E

Map
- Location of airport in China

Runways
Direction	Length		Surface
Direction	m	ft	Surface
	2,800	9,186

Yan'an Ershilipu Airport
- Traditional Chinese: 延安二十里堡機場
- Simplified Chinese: 延安二十里堡机场
Transcriptions
Standard Mandarin
- Hanyu Pinyin: Yán'ān Èrshílǐpù Jīchǎng

Yan'an Ershilipu Airport was a dual-use military and public airport serving the city of Yan'an in Shaanxi Province, China. It was opened in 1980, replacing the former Yan'an Dongguan Airport which was built in January 1936. It was closed on 8 November 2018, when Yan'an Nanniwan Airport began operation and all flights were transferred to the new airport.

== See also ==
- List of airports in China
- List of the busiest airports in China
