= History of Baota District =

The location of Baota District within Yan'an

The history of Baota District, the contemporary urban core of Yan'an, spans several millennia. Various non-Han ethnicities continuously inhabited the region for millennia prior to the arrival of the Jin state in the 7th century BCE. Over the next several centuries, the area saw frequent periods of conflict, and routinely changed hands from various Han Chinese states and dynasties, and various non-Han Chinese states. The area of contemporary Baota District became a strategic border location for various Chinese dynasties, and site of numerous inter-state battles through the early Ming dynasty.

The area became of particular significance again during the 1930s, when, after the Long March, it became the epicenter of activity for the Chinese Communist Party. The area was the site of conflict during the Second Sino-Japanese War and the Chinese Civil War after the collapse of the Second United Front. During the Great Leap Forward, the largely agrarian area began to industrialize, and during the Cultural Revolution, it became the site of intra-party conflict. Since then, the district's population and economy has steadily grown.

== Pre-Han dynasty ==
Government sources believe that the Guifang established an independent state in the area circa the 16th century BCE. A few dozen ancient jade artifacts uncovered within the district indicate that the territory once belonged to the Shang dynasty.

During the Zhou dynasty, the area was inhabited by the Xianyun and Xirong tribes.

Later, the area was inhabited by the Baidi (Chinese: 白狄; pinyin: Báidí) clan of the Beidi groups. These people were predominantly nomads and hunters. In 627 CE, the Jin state defeated the local Baidi, captured their leader, and incorporated the territory into their lands. When the Jin state collapsed in 376 BCE, the area of present-day Baota District was incorporated into the Wei state.

In 328 BCE, the Qin took the land over from the Wei state. Under the rule of Emperor Qin Shihuang, the area was organized as Gaonu County within the Shang Commandery beginning in 221 BCE.

== Han dynasty ==
Following the collapse of the Qin in 206 BCE, as part of Xiang Yu's attempted rebellion, Gaonu County briefly was held by rebel forces. However, this proved to be short lived, and forces loyal Emperor Gaozu of the newly created Han dynasty retook Gaonu County.

Xiongnu forces number approximately 30,000 invaded and looted Gaonu County in 158 BCE. News of this reached Chang'an, and Han troops were sent to reclaim Gaonu County, which they did after a month. In 117 BCE, as part of the Han–Xiongnu War, Han dynasty forces retook areas of Gaonu County which were previously occupied by Xiongnu forces.

An imperial edict from Emperor Wu in 120 BCE forced approximately 700,000 poor peasants to migrate to the Shaanbei region, resulting in a period of significant agricultural development. The Commentary on the Water Classic, written by Li Daoyuan, highlights observations made during this period that Gaonu County had certain flammable water, which would turn out to be petroleum.

A major earthquake afflicted the Shang Commandery in 32 BCE.

In 9 CE, Gaonu County was renamed to Pingli County (simplified Chinese: 平利县; traditional Chinese: 平利縣; pinyin: Pínglì Xiàn). Shortly afterwards, it was renamed Gaonu County.

Towards the end of the Eastern Han period, the Xiongnu retook control of the area.

== Five Barbarians rule ==
During its incorporation into the Xiongnu confederacy, the Xiongnu people, the Qiang people, and a number of smaller ethnic groups inhabited the area. However, the Western Jin would then retake the land, until Liu Yuan, a Xiongnu noble, rose up and established the Han Zhao state in 304 CE.

After Liu Bobo established the Great Xia dynasty in 407 CE, he built the ancient city of Fenglin (simplified Chinese: 丰林; traditional Chinese: 豐林), which was located in present-day Zhoujiawan Village (Chinese: 周家湾村) in the town of Liqu.

In 451 CE, the Northern Wei organized the area under the jurisdiction of Guangluo County (simplified Chinese: 广洛县; traditional Chinese: 廣洛縣), located in present-day Ansai District. Guangluo County was ruled by the Jinming Commandery (Chinese: 金明郡).

In 559 CE, local Jihu leaders Hao Abao and Hao Langpi fought against the Northern Zhou on behalf of the Northern Qi, but were defeated by Northern Zhou leader Gao Lin.

== Sui dynasty ==
In 582 CE, a number of prominent Göktürk leaders, including Tardu Khagan, Apa Khaghan, and Tanhan Khargan, led an army of approximately 400,000 Göktürks to invade the Sui dynasty. Sui forces in contemporary Baota District successfully repelled them.

Yanzhou, the zhou which governed the area during the early Sui dynasty, was abolished in 607 CE, and replaced with Yan'an Commandery. Under both Yanzhou and Yan'an Commandery, the area of contemporary Baota District was governed as Fushi County (simplified Chinese: 肤施县; traditional Chinese: 膚施縣; pinyin: Fūshī Xiàn).

In 614 CE, general Liu Jia (simplified Chinese: 刘迦; traditional Chinese: 劉迦) attempted an uprising in the area, centered on nearby Fu County. The uprising quickly failed, and was crushed.

In February of 617 CE, rebel leader Liang Shidu captured the northern portions of Yan'an Commandery during his march southward.

== Tang dynasty ==
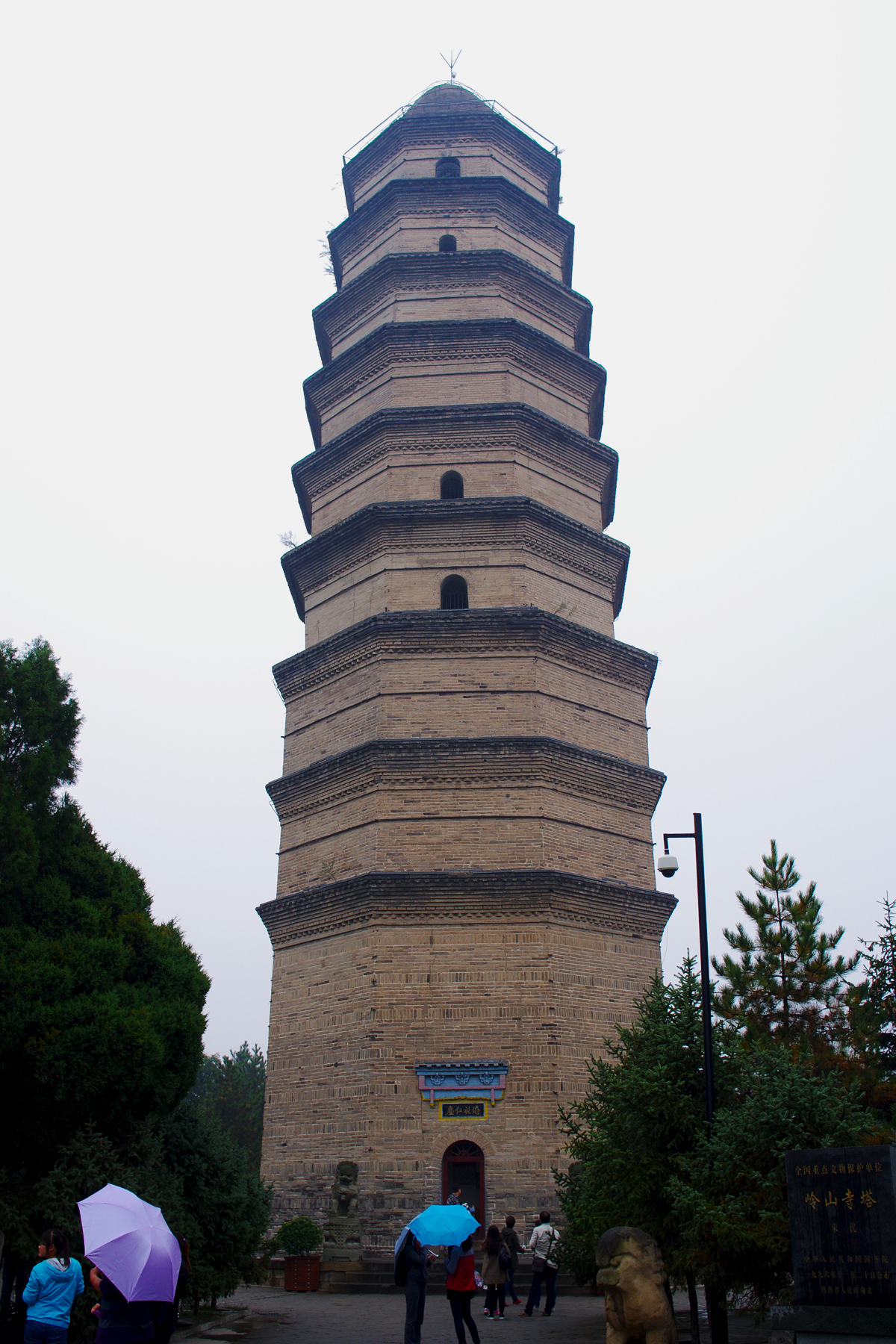
The pagoda on Baota Mountain, constructed from 766 to 779 CE

In September of 619 CE, Liang Shidu and his army was expelled from the region by Tang dynasty general Duan Decao, who was appointed as the head of the Tang's Yanzhou armed forces.

In 633 CE, under Tang rule, the Yanhua Canal (Chinese: 延化渠) was dug out in Yanzhou to better conserve water in the region, and to help irrigate crops. However, the region's agriculture remains highly susceptible to episodes of severe frost, which killed local crops in 651 CE, 679 CE, and 704 CE.

The area of present-day Baota District was greatly affected by the An Lushan Rebellion, which reduced Yanzhou's population from 16,345 households down to just 938 households. In 765 CE, while travelling through the region to migrate to an area less afflicted by the conflict, famous poet Du Fu spent a night in Qilipu (Chinese: 七里铺), in what is now the southern portion of Baota District.

From 766 to 779 CE, the pagoda on Jialing Mountain (simplified Chinese: 嘉岭山; traditional Chinese: 嘉嶺山), now known as Baota Mountain, was constructed.

In 895 CE, Yanzhou experienced rain for a span of 60 consecutive days.

== Subsequent period of conflict ==
Following the collapse of the Tang dynasty, Yanzhou was thrown into decades of unrest, with reported military conflicts in the region happening in 936, 947, and 953 CE. In 962 CE, the Tangut and Qiang peoples, who lived around Yanzhou, became tributaries of the newly emergent Song dynasty. Local Tangut leader Li Jipeng, who ruled over a population of over 50,000 households, visited the Song capital of Bianjing (present-day Kaifeng) in 982 CE.

In 977 CE, the region was afflicted by a severe drought.

When the Western Xia declared independence in 1038, Yanzhou became an important border location. Emperor Renzong of the Song dynasty organized a number of circuits in the region to consolidate Song rule in the region, including Fyuan Circuit and Huanqing Circuit. However, the Western Xia invaded the region in early 1040, led by Emperor Jingzong. Song forces, led by Fan Yong, mobilized to defend 36 villages in the area. Emperor Jingzong captured Jinming (in present-day Ansai District), and then moved on to Yanzhou's center, located in what is now Baota District. After three days of fighting, Western Xia forces captured the area. However, heavy snowfalls later led to food shortages among Western Xia soldiers in Yanzhou, and they were forced to withdraw from the region shortly after. Song general Zhao Zhen was put in charge of guarding the Song's border with the Western Xia, but was dismissed from this role in June 1040 following a Western Xia raid which killed two major generals. Zhao Zhen commanded 8,000 soldiers, but only sent 100 to fend off the attack, resulting in accusations that he refused to help.

In 1041, Fan Zhongyan was put in charge of Qing Prefecture, and Pang Ji was put in charge of Yanzhou.

While serving as a military officer in Yanzhou, Song dynasty scientist Shen Kuo conducted a number of experiments with petroleum in the region, which he believed would have many uses.

Following the collapse of the Song dynasty, the Jin dynasty (not to be confused with the aforementioned Western Jin) was established, and began making quick advances into the region. In November 1128, the Jin conquered nearby Danzhou (in present-day Yichuan County, directly to Baota's south), and then moved to conquer the eastern portion of Yan'an Fu, the fu which governed the region at the time. Following their success in the eastern portion, the Jin conquered the western portions of Yan'an Fu. Jin rule in the region lasted less than a century, with Mongol Empire soldiers capturing the eastern portion of Yan'an Fu in 1221. When the Western Xia was completely conquered by the Mongol Empire in 1227, Jin forces withdrew from Yan'an Fu, allowing the Mongol Empire to occupy it.

An earthquake struck the region during one night in September 1303. In May 1314, a hailstorm with strong winds impacted much of the regions crops, farm animals, and humans. Flooding in the summer of June 1326 uprooted 90 households in Fushi County.

== Ming dynasty ==
In May 1369, Ming dynasty forces led by Xu Da conquered Yan'an Fu.

Yan'an Fu suffered another natural disaster in July 1373, when a drought caused a local famine.

Remnants of the Mongol-led Yuan dynasty, led by Boyan Timur, attacked the region in 1376. However, they were repelled by Ming generals Tang He and Fu Youde, the latter of whom went on to capture Boyan Timur. This marked the final military conflict in Yan'an Fu for many decades.

The region went on to suffer two major natural disasters in 1439. First, a drought happened in the summer, then, the region was flooded in the autumn. These two disasters resulted in a nearly non-existent harvest that year. Another major disaster struck on September 30, 1448, when an earthquake hit the region. Heavy rainfalls in 1456 resulted in major structural damage to many buildings in the region. Serious droughts again afflicted the region in the summer of 1481, and the autumn of 1484.

Yanli Canal (Chinese: 延利渠) was built in the south of Yan'an Fu in 1496, creating Liu Lake (Chinese: 柳湖).

An insect plague destroyed much of the region's crops in October 1497.

The Yongji Bridge (Chinese: 永济桥) was built outside of the eastern gate of the central city in Yan'an Fu in 1503. Yongji Bridge reached a height of 2.18 metres (7.2 ft), and spanned across a distance of 3.11 metres (10.2 ft).

On October 17, 1505, Yan'an Fu was hit by two separate earthquakes on the same day.

Chinese poet Li Panlong, one of the Latter Seven Masters, wrote a poem about the city in 1570 titled "Yanzhou City" (Chinese: 延州城; pinyin: Yánzhōu Chéng).

Severe famine afflicted the region in 1629, and again in 1632.

Chinese peasant rebel leader Li Zicheng occupied Yan'an Fu in November 1643, as part of his short-lived Shun dynasty. Li renamed Yan'an Fu to Tianbao Fu (Chinese: 天保府).

== Qing dynasty ==
Shun forces continued to control Tianbao Fu in the face of ascendant Qing dynasty forces in 1645. Led by Li Guo and Gao Yigong, Shun forces retreated from Wayaobu to Tianbao Fu's urban center. They held it for 20 days before being abandoning it due to lack of food supplies.

In March 1649, Qing general Wang Yongqiang led a rebellion, killing local governor Wang Zhengzhi.

From 1753 to 1773, the region was afflicting by droughts during 10 of its 20 springs, culminating in a failed harvest in 1773.

The White Lotus Rebellion afflicted the region in 1796. Rich families were robbed, and tax collections were resisted.

The Dungan Revolt afflicted the region in 1868, with a major riot breaking out in Sanshilipu (Chinese: 三十里铺), in what is now the town of Liulin.

In 1877, a drought afflicted the region so badly that people resorted to cannibalism. This episode was part of the wider Northern Chinese Famine of 1876–1879, which afflicted the Shaanbei region that year, and led to numerous documented instances of cannibalism in and around present-day Yan'an.

In August 1889, a severe flood afflicted the region, resulting in crops getting washed away.

Frost afflicted the region's crops beginning in the summer of 1899, freezing and killing crops. This continued every summer throughout the next five years.

In 1904 and 1910, the prominent imperial academy in the area, Heming Academy (simplified Chinese: 和鸣书院; traditional Chinese: 和鳴書院; pinyin: Hèmíng Shūyuàn) was spun off into two modern-styled schools.

== Republic of China ==
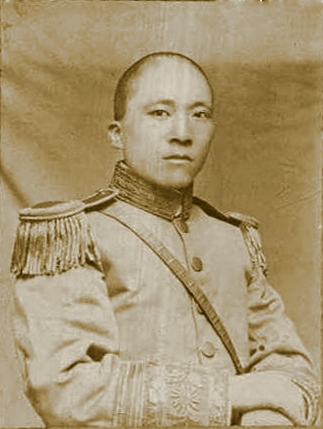
A picture of local warlord Yang Hucheng, taken sometime during the 1920s

On January 1, 1912, the Republic of China was declared, and thousands of Republican troops were stationed in Yan'an Fu to established control.

In 1913, the Republican government reorganized China's administrative divisions, abolishing the fu, and re-establishing the circuit. As such, in 1913, Yan'an Fu was abolished, and Fushi County was assigned to the jurisdiction of Yulin Circuit.

Famers in the town of Lin revolted in June 1913, and laid siege to nearby Yanchang County. The attempted rebellion led to the deaths of 4 people, the wounding of at least 40, and the arrest of 20 people. In subsequent years, a large amount of military forces continued to garrison Fushi County.

Fushi County continued educational reforms begun in the late Qing dynasty, with two primary schools for boys, a primary school for girls, a secondary school, and a Christian-affiliated school all being established in 1915. These schools combined enrolled a total of 145 students upon their foundation that year.

In 1916, American oil company Mobil conducted geological surveys of Fushi County, and began drilling oil wells.

A post office was established in Fushi County in 1917. In August of that year, the region did not receive its typical heavy rainfalls, which had not happened for the first time in approximately a century. The eastern portion of the city's walls were uprooted the following month, and severe banditry afflicted Fushi County and neighboring Ansai County that December. This banditry evolved into a full-fledged revolution, and in June 1918, prominent Chinese educator and politician Yu Youren arrived in the region to partake in revolutionary activities. A police station was built in Fushi County in 1920, staffed by dozens of personnel equipped with guns. However, the government of Baota District claims that these policemen often looted people's properties and violently attacked people, instead of establishing order and peace.

In 1920, a bank was built in Fushi County, which served the nascent commercial and industrial sectors of the region, as well as military higher-ups.

An earthquake afflicted the county in December 1920, creating landslides which damaged and destroyed many homes. A drought afflicted the Shaanbei region the following year.

Yang Hucheng, a warlord in the region, invaded the region from Luochuan County on July 5, 1922. Yang's forces continued from the region up to Ansai County and Jingbian County.

Another secondary school was opened in Fushi County in the spring of 1925, enrolling approximately 20 students from Fushi County and the surrounding areas.

A telegraph office was established in Fushi County in 1934, connecting the county to Xi'an, Yulin, and Luochuan County. By 1935, telephone calls from Fushi County could reach destinations such as Xi'an, Sanyuan County, Yao County, Luochuan County, Lintong, Suide, and Yulin.

== Communist activity and Chinese Civil War ==
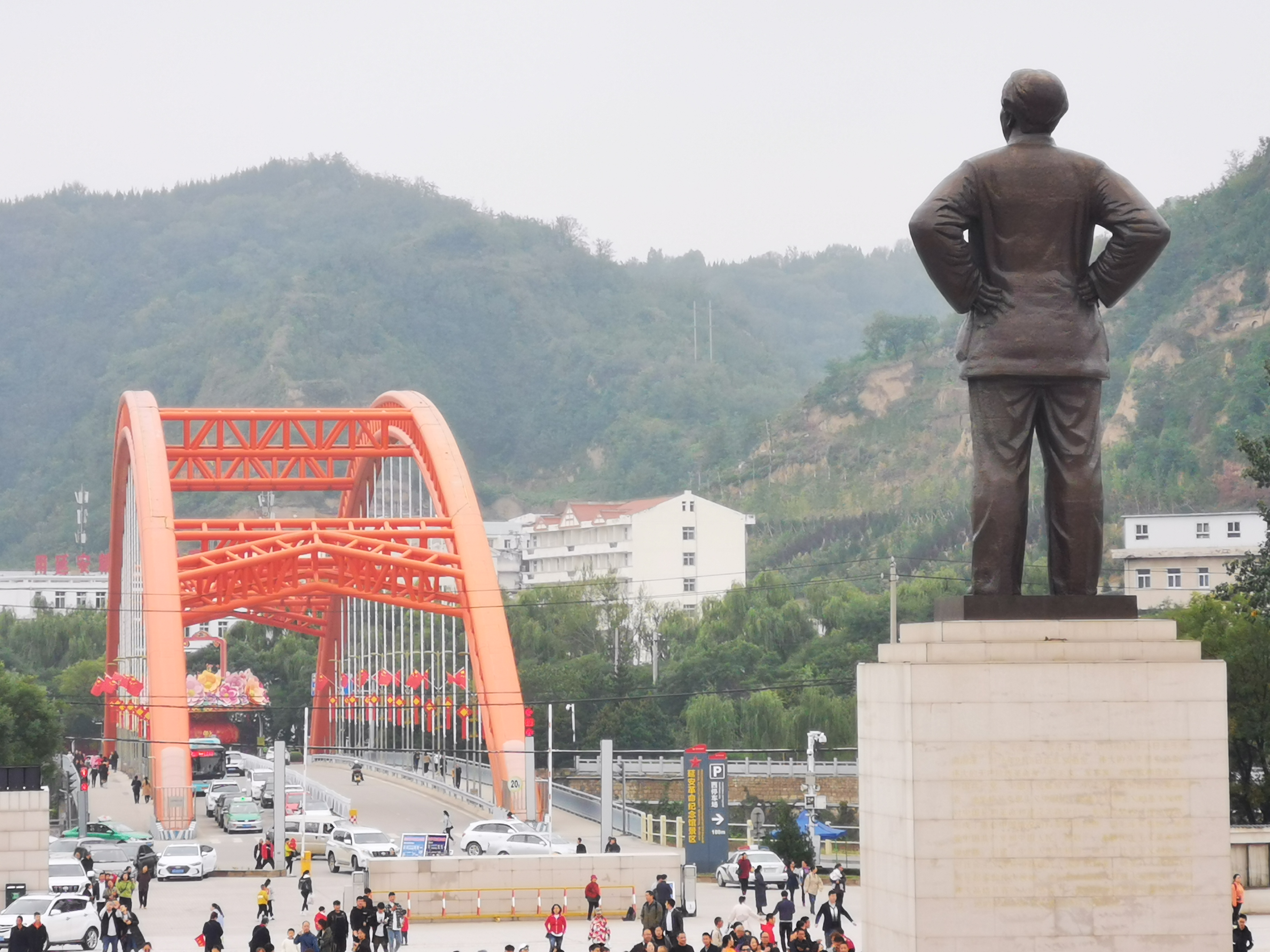
A Statue of Mao Zedong in Baota District

Beginning in 1923, communist agitators such as Wei Yechou, Li Zizhou, and Huyan Zhendong (simplified Chinese: 呼延震东; traditional Chinese: 呼延震東) began organizing in what was then Fushi County. By August 1925, party members began teaching and spreading communist literature in a secondary school in the county, and a Chinese Communist Party (CCP) branch was established in Yan'an by the summer of the following year. In August 1927, local warlord Jing Yuexiu closed the school the CCP members were organizing in, but re-opened it the following month. Though forced underground, CCP members had re-entered the school by October, and succeeded in expelling reactionary faculty by December 1927. Now formally organized, CCP activities in the area continued, and in the summer of 1929, Liu Zhidan visited Fushi County to inspect the Party, and give orders for future activities.

In the spring of 1931, CCP leaders helped organize a rally of approximately 3,000 farmers against various taxes put on their grains and other crops. They ultimately failed in abolishing the taxes, and in response, local warlord Jing Yuexiu closed the school where CCP members organized, and effectively forced the party to go back underground. However, the CCP's underground efforts in the county were further thwarted after the Secretary of the Shaanxi Provincial Committee of the CCP, Du Heng, defected.

Beginning in February 1935, CCP forces began engaging in a number of military conflicts with local Mintuan, pro-Nationalist militias which effectively governed the region. On February 12, 1935, Red Army cavalry forces defeated Mintuan in Sanshilipu (Chinese: 三十里铺), in what is now the town of Liulin. On February 18, Red Army forces defeated a hodgepodge of 50 Mintuan soldiers spanning from the town of Lin to neighboring Ganquan County. That evening, they defeated another 50 Mintuan soldiers from the village of Jinpenwan (Chinese: 金盆湾) in present-day Madongchuan. Two days later, the Red Army defeated a force of over 100 Mintuan soldiers from the town of Lin.

== United Front and CCP government ==
In the spring of 1935, CCP officials appointed Ma Wenrui and other revolutionaries to the town of Lin to form the Revolutionary Committee of the Eastern Area of the Shaan-Gan Border Region (simplified Chinese: 陕甘边东区革命委员会; traditional Chinese: 陝甘邊東區革命委員會; pinyin: Shǎn Gān Biān Dōngqū Gémìng Wěiyuánhuì). In May, the Yan'an County CCP Committee (simplified Chinese: 中共延安县委; traditional Chinese: 中共延安縣委; pinyin: Zhōnggòng Yán'ān Xiàn Wěi) was re-established, and the Yan'an County Revolutionary Committee was established (simplified Chinese: 延安县革命委员; traditional Chinese: 延安縣革命委員; pinyin: Yán'ān Xiàn Gémìng Wěiyuán), and both met in the village of Liuxiaogou (simplified Chinese: 刘小沟; traditional Chinese: 劉小溝), in present-day Qinghuabian. On May 31, Red Army forces took the town of Ganguyi. On July 18, a meeting of CCP forces was held in Qinghuabian, where they declared the transformation of the Yan'an Revolutionary Committee into the Yan'an County Soviet Government (simplified Chinese: 延安县苏维埃政府; traditional Chinese: 延安縣蘇維埃政府; pinyin: Yán'ān Xiàn Sūwéi'āi Zhèngfǔ). In November, a similar declaration transformed the Fushi County Revolutionary Committee (simplified Chinese: 肤施县革命委员会; traditional Chinese: 膚施縣革命委員會; pinyin: Fūshī Xiàn Gémìng Wěiyuánhuì) into the Fushi County Soviet Government (simplified Chinese: 肤施县苏维埃政府; traditional Chinese: 膚施縣蘇維埃政府; pinyin: Fūshī Xiàn Sūwéi'āi Zhèngfǔ).

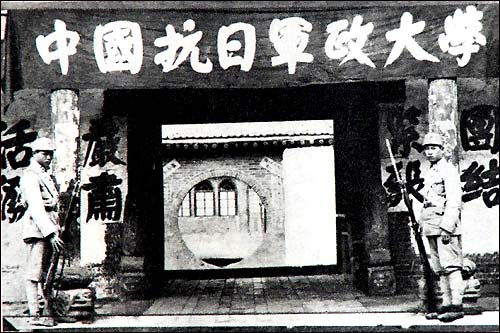
The gate of the Counter-Japanese Military and Political University that was established in Yan'an

In February and April 1936, CCP forces from the area met with local Nationalist forces and Catholic Church representatives to stop some fighting and agree to certain borders in the hopes of stopping local conflict in the face of a rising Japanese presence in China. In spite of recent victories and formal declarations, CCP forces did not go unchallenged in the region. On November 19, 1936, a number of CCP figures, including some from neighboring Ansai County, were captured by Mintuan forces. They were executed in Fushi County two days later. At 2 am on December 18, in response to the Xi'an Incident and a challenging military situation, the remaining Mintuan fled from Fushi County. At dawn on the same day, Red Army forces moved into the county's urban core. On January 13, 1937, Mao Zedong and the CCP Central Committee moved into the center of Fushi County, and established the Yan'an City CCP Committee (Chinese: 中共延安市委). In February 1937, the CCP abolished Fushi County, merging it into Yan'an County. In March, Hongquan County (simplified Chinese: 红泉县; traditional Chinese: 紅泉縣; pinyin: Hóngquán Xiàn) was merged into neighboring Yichuan County, with the new merged county named Hongyi County (simplified Chinese: 红宜县; traditional Chinese: 紅宜縣; pinyin: Hóngyí Xiàn). Despite these advances, the CCP forces in Yan'an remained somewhat stalled with their negotiations with the Nationalist government. On May 25, 1937, Zhou Enlai and other CCP delegations travelling to Xi'an to meet with Kuomintang officials were attacked by bandits, and 11 CCP officials were killed. On May 31, 1937, the Yan'an Anti-Japanese Salvation Congress (simplified Chinese: 延安市抗日救国会; traditional Chinese: 延安市抗日救國會; pinyin: Yán'ān Shì Kàngrì Jiùguó Huì) met, and elected 13 Executive Committee members. Beginning in July and August 1937, a number of large Anti-Japanese meetings and mobilization efforts in Yan'an took place. During this time, a number of journalists arrived to the region to report on its mobilization efforts, including Ding Ling and Agnes Smedley. A defense organization meant to mitigate Japanese airstrikes was formed on August 19, 1937.

The Shaan-Gan-Ning Border Region was formally established in Yan'an on September 6, 1937. The following month, the Yan'an Municipal Government was formally established. On April 17, 1938, Nationalist general Wei Lihuang travelled to Yan'an and met with Mao Zedong. On August 25, 1938, Zhu De returned from the front line, and held a rally to the south of Yan'an's city gate which attracted over 10,000 people. The area of present-day Baota District did not see any conflicts relating to the Sino-Japanese War until November 1938, but the CCP government held near perpetual Anti-Japanese rallies, congresses, and military exercises, and the area served as a launching pad for CCP forces who fought the Japanese elsewhere.

On November 20 and November 21, 1938, Japanese airplanes conducted a bombing campaign against Yan'an, killing and wounding more than 100 people. On March 10, 1939, 14 Japanese planes performed a number of bombing runs on Yan'an. Another aerial bombing took place on August 15, with 10 Japanese airplanes dropping 50 bombs, wounding 5 people. On September 8, 64 Japanese bombers performed 3 bombing runs on Yan'an, killing and wounding more than 30 people. During October and November 1939, local businesspeople and enterprises donated sizable sums of money to the war effort and reconstruction purposes.

Despite the sporadic Japanese bombings from November 1938 through September 1939, no there was no further conflict with the Japanese within Yan'an for the remainder of the war. During that time, the area continued to serve as the center for political rallies and war mobilizations, including some events involving the famous Eighth Route Army, as well prominent CCP leaders like Mao Zedong and Zhu De.

In 1941, long-distance telephone services were introduced to the region.

On August 24, 1942, flash flooding along the Nanchuan River, which flows through the southern portion of present-day Baota District, killed 89 people and caused immense property damage.

From October 19, 1942, to January 14, 1943, the CCP held a prolonged series of meetings in Yan'an to denounce Wang Ming. Prominent CCP officials such as Mao Zedong and Ren Bishi spoke in denunciation of Wang Ming.

On August 15, 1945, a large celebration was held in Yan'an to celebrate the surrender of Japan.

== Second Chinese Civil War ==
Following the conclusion of World War II, the Chinese Civil War resumed. On July 26, 1946, Chinese pilot Liu Shanben defected from the Nationalist side, fleeing from Sichuan to Yan'an to join the CCP. Under CCP control, political reforms began to materialize in the area shortly after the war. In January 1947, the government of Chuankou redistributed more than 240 hectares (590 acres) which local peasants claimed was stolen from them by landlords.

Seven Nationalist aircraft bombed Yan'an on August 2, 1946. On November 11, Nationalist planes flew two reconnaissance missions over Yan'an, but did not bomb the area. A lone Nationalist plane bombed Yan'an in early November 1947.

A major battle for Qinghuabian was fought on March 24, with five Red Army brigades defending the town from Nationalist forces.

From May 2 to May 4, the Red Army and Nationalist Army engaged in a battle for Panlong (simplified Chinese: 蟠龙; traditional Chinese: 蟠龍), which the Red Army won.

On May 11, the Red Army, led by Yan Kuiyao, succeeded in recapturing Jinpenwan from the Nationalists.

Following the Battle of Shajiadian in August 1947, which resulted in a major defeat for the Nationalist army, Nationalist troops led by Hu Zongnan retreated from Yulin, moving south into Yan'an.

25 Nationalists planes arrived on November 13 to bomb the urban areas of Yan'an, and 140,000 Nationalists soldiers commanded by Hu Zongnan attempted to invade. On November 14 and 15, Nationalists aircraft continued to bomb Yan'an's urban core, and also bombed the village of Jinpenwan. By November 18, CCP forces evacuated the city, fleeing northwards, and Nationalist forces moved in.

The CCP claims that while occupying portions of Yan'an in March 1947, the Nationalist Army engaged in a white terror, targeting the local population. By early 1948, CCP forces in the area were relegated to using guerilla warfare tactics, and many CCP units were captured by Nationalist forces in the area. In March 1948, Peng Dehuai led a team from Yan'an County in a battle in nearby Yichuan County. On April 22, Yan'an was recaptured by the Red Army, and various CCP government institutions subsequently returned to Yan'an. In the weeks following its recapture, CCP officials led a number of parades through the city.

Following the recapture of the city of Yan'an, CCP forces saw a number of other military successes nearby. On October 15, 1948, a group 12 Nationalist soldiers in Qilipu, in the south of what is now Baota District, surrendered to the Red Army. With increased control of the area, CCP forces oversaw the reopening of many local businesses in Yan'an County in January 1949. The CCP also made a number of administrative changes to the area. In February 1949, they abolished Linzhen County (simplified Chinese: 临镇县; traditional Chinese: 臨鎮縣; pinyin: Línzhèn Xiàn), which was centered around the town of Lin, and merged it into Yan'an County and Yanchang County. They further consolidated the area by subordinating Yan'an City to Yan'an County in March. On May 5, Yan'an County was placed under the jurisdiction of the Shaanbei Administrative Area, which roughly corresponded to the contemporary boundaries of Yan'an. Also in May, the capital of the Shaan-Gan-Ning Border District was moved from Yan'an to Xi'an.

The newly reorganized government of Yan'an County faced a test on July 14, 1949, when an episode of hail damaged over a thousand houses, and over 18,000 mu of cropland.

== People's Republic of China ==
With the declaration of the People's Republic of China on October 1, 1949, and the retreat of Nationalist forces from the region, the Yan'an County government began embarking on administrative reshufflings and reconstruction efforts, while continuing to hold large-scale political rallies in the county.

From May through July 1950, an unidentified illness swept through Liulin, Jinpenwan, Panlong, Lin, and Yan'an's urban center, killing a recorded 680 people. An epidemic prevention team visited the county in March of the following year.

Beginning in early December 1950, rallies and meetings against the American involvement in the Korean War were held in the Yan'an County.

On January 3, 1951, 6 new primary schools were opened in the county.

Flooding hit the city on the afternoon of August 3, 1953.

In January 1955, Yan'an County adjusted its internal divisions, resulting in 9 county-controlled districts and 45 townships.

By March 1956, all of Yan'an County's districts had received telephone connections. A thermal power plant was built in June, and electric lighting was installed throughout Yan'an city. During this time, the county underwent a degree of industrialization as part of the Great Leap Forward, with a carpet factory, brick and tile factory, a repair shop, a printing factory, and a shoemaking shop all being built in 1956. On April 9, 1958, construction began on the Yan River Bridge (Chinese: 延河大桥; pinyin: Yán Hé Dàqiáo). The Yanhui Canal Dam (simplified Chinese: 延惠渠水坝; traditional Chinese: 延惠渠水壩; pinyin: Yánhuì Qú Shuǐbà) was completed on July 1, 1958. Yan'an County began backyard smelting in early September the same year. At 10:50 am on October 3, the first civil aviation flight from Xi'an to Yan'an landed at Yan'an Dongguan Airport (simplified Chinese: 延安东关机场; traditional Chinese: 延安東關機場; pinyin: Yán'ān Dōngguān Jīchǎng).

In December 1958, the entirety of Ganquan County, as well as the areas of Zhuanyaowan, Zhao'an, Xujiagou (simplified Chinese: 徐家沟; traditional Chinese: 徐家溝), Huangcaowan (simplified Chinese: 黄草湾; traditional Chinese: 黃草灣), and Yanhewan from Ansai County were all merged into Yan'an County.

On April 18, 1959, the county government paid sums of money to lower-income households to combat famine in the county. On May 3, 1959, Yan'an Dongguan Bridge (simplified Chinese: 延安东关大桥; traditional Chinese: 延安東關大橋; pinyin: Yán'ān Dōngguān Dàqiáo) was opened. The bridge spans a length of 120.25 metres (394.5 ft), and is 8 metres (26 ft) wide. A nursing home was opened in the county on September 4. The county government initiated the construction of the Ershilipu Hydropower Station (simplified Chinese: 二十里铺水电站; traditional Chinese: 二十里鋪水電站; pinyin: Èrshílǐpù Shuǐdiàn Zhàn) on January 5, 1960. Food scarcity remained an issue in the county, and the county government issued a notice on February 16, 1960, urging residents to conserve food. In early October 1962, the county began collectivizing much of its economy. A committee to help conserve soil and water was established on March 13, 1963. On July 23, 1963, much of the county's farmland was affected by four separate hailstorms, and the county received financial aid. Yan'an County remained highly agrarian during this time, with the 1964 Chinese Census reporting that 110,683 of the county's 152,359 people were dependent on agriculture.

On October 3, 1964, Indonesian President Sukarno visited Yan'an, and was shown various revolutionary sites. A delegation from the North Vietnamese Vietnam News Agency visited Yan'an on October 27.

On October 22, 1964, Yan'an County received the first of 32 batches of people who relocated as part of the Down to the Countryside Movement.

The Yan'an Yangjialing Bridge (simplified Chinese: 延安杨家岭大桥; traditional Chinese: 延安楊家嶺大橋; pinyin: Yán'ān Yángjiālǐng Dàqiáo) was opened to traffic on December 10, 1964. The first 18 asphalt roads were paved in Yan'an city on May 21, 1966, totaling a length of 25 kilometres (16 mi).

=== Cultural Revolution and intra-party conflict ===
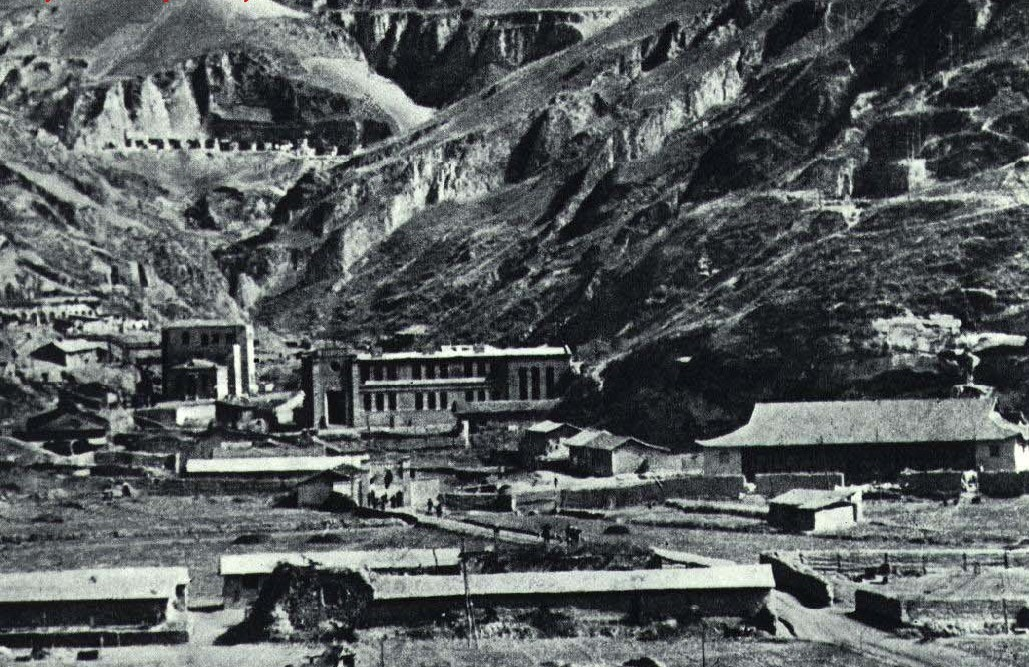
Yangjialing in October 1967

In 1966, the Cultural Revolution began in Yan'an County. Beginning in May of that year, dazibao began appearing at schools, teachers were denounced, rallies against the Three Family Village were held, and the county established a group to further promote revolutionary activities. On July 8, over 800 teachers from Yan'an County partook in a CCP training program which lasted more than 80 days. Yan'an's first Red Guards were established on August 18. By October, the Red Guards were implanted in the county's schools. During that time, a campaign against the Four Olds was enacted. The Red Guards in Yan'an hosted a number of schools in the county where over 200,000 students from around China came to receive ideological training. This large influx of students generated a sizable amount of economic revenue for the county. Many of these students went on to form rival communist organizations, which engaged in widespread debate and disputes with the Red Guards throughout the county.

On January 27, 1967, a "rebel faction" formed a committee to "take over" the county's political structure, and began openly criticizing local party leaders. The group's influence would go on to effectively paralyze the work of the county government. In February of that year, the local army was mobilized to support the San zhi liang jun campaign, which mobilized the military to provide political support, industrial support, agricultural support, managerial support, and military exercises. By March, the county's 410 work units had effectively been split between the ruling CCP figures and the opposition faction, and 848 different combat teams (Chinese: 战斗队; pinyin: zhàndòu duì), militias formed by supporters of a particular faction, had been organized throughout the county. A large public "debate" took place on May 15, and on July 30, the two sides organized violent demonstrations against one another, killing 1 and wounding more than 30. The two sides engaged in another series of violent demonstrations on a bridge on September 3, killing 2 and wounding more than 20. Tensions between the two sides reached a boiling point on October 6, when a local official named Qiao Hongjun (simplified Chinese: 乔鸿俊; traditional Chinese: 喬鴻俊; pinyin: Qiáo Hóngjùn) was escorting a visiting delegation comprising officials from seven countries, including Albania, Romania, and Japan to their hotel. The opposition faction stormed the hotel, resulting in a violent response from crowds supporting the government. When Qiao emerged to try to work out a solution, he was badly beaten, and rushed to Xi'an for medical treatment. Perhaps emboldened from that incident, an anti-government mob stormed the county's military headquarters on the night of December 10, seizing approximately 400 weapons and 1.4 million rounds of ammunition. The following morning, a group from the pro-government faction also stole weapons and ammunition from the county's military forces, although on a much smaller scale. On December 16, members of the county's opposition faction attacked the military members stationed in the city, and forced the soldiers to leave. Beginning that month, members from the two factions began robbing banks for money, and robbing other people and institutions for grain and cooking oil. The next year, from February 27 to March 16, the two sides engaged in open warfare, with approximately 1,000 combatants using machine guns, artillery, and other military-grade weapons to attack each other. 15 people were killed, and an additional 11 were injured during this battle. Later in March, Zhou Enlai invited the two sides to Beijing to work out an agreement, and a declaration of peace between the two sides was reached. As part of this agreement, the two sides agreed to let a unit of the People's Liberation Army (PLA) be stationed in Yan'an, and continue the san zhi liang jun campaign. On April 12, the two sides reached an agreement to hand over their weapons to the PLA, and on the morning of the 14th, PLA soldiers took over military checkpoints and guard posts surrounding Yan'an city.

However, large-scale fighting resumed the next month, and from May 29 through July, open fighting between the two factions resulted in about 110 more deaths and 30 more people wounded. The unrest began to spread beyond Yan'an County, with the two sides skirmishing in nearby Zhidan County and Wuqi County on June 3, killing seven people. Another fight in Chafang, Fu County on June 14 killed more than 30 people. By July, the CCP Central Committee intervened, issuing two proclamations, one on July 3 and another on July 24, calling on the two sides to cease fighting. Leaders from the two factions were sent to Xi'an to partake in a study session, where they arranged a truce, and a surrender of their confiscated weapons. As a result, the Yan'an County Revolutionary Committee (simplified Chinese: 延安县革命委员会; traditional Chinese: 延安縣革命委員會; pinyin: Yán'ān Xiàn Gémìng Wěiyuánhuì), part of the county government, was established in August 18, featuring leaders from both factions. On August 29, this committee agreed to promote the two proclamations made in July by the Central Committee. The local committee also agreed to compensate those from which the two factions stole from, although the amount paid in compensation was just a small fraction of what was stolen.

On December 2, 1968, a batch of approximately 4,500 educated youths from Beijing was sent to Yan'an as part of the Down to the Countryside Movement. On January 19, 1969, the Yan'an County Revolutionary Committee ordered a reduction of Yan'an's urban population, and sent more than 6,000 urban residents to rural portions of the county to help with agricultural work.

On November 17, 1970, Prince Sihanouk of Cambodia visited Yan'an, and on September 20 of the following year, Penn Nouth and his wife also visited. In 1971 alone, delegations from communist parties, military academies, cultural institutions, and scientific institutions came to visit Yan'an from countries such as Belgium, Cambodia, Canada, the Dominican Republic, Japan, Pakistan, Spain, the United Kingdom, and the United States.

In February 1972, Yan'an City was re-established as a county-level city.

On June 9, 1973, Zhou Enlai hosted North Vietnamese leaders Lê Duẩn and Phạm Văn Đồng in Yan'an.

On May 1, 1974, 39 educated youths from Beijing and 16 educated youths from Xi'an were sent to Yan'an as part of the Down to the Countryside Movement.

On June 1, 1974, the Yan'an Nanhe Baotashan Highway Bridge (Chinese: 延安南河宝塔山公路桥; pinyin: Yán'ān Nánhé Bǎotǎshān Gōnglù Qiáo) was completed and opened to traffic. The reinforced concrete bridge spans 87 metres (285 ft) in length, is 7 metres (23 ft) wide, and features sidewalks on both sides of the road.

On August 10, 1975, Yan'an County was merged into Yan'an City.

The Wangjiaping Bridge (Chinese: 王家坪大桥; pinyin: Wángjiāpíng Dàqiáo) was completed and opened to traffic on January 1, 1976. The bridge spans a length of 201 metres (659 ft), and totals 10 metres (33 ft) wide.

On May 16, 1976, Lee Kuan Yew, the Prime Minister of Singapore, and his wife visited Yan'an.

=== Post-Mao era ===
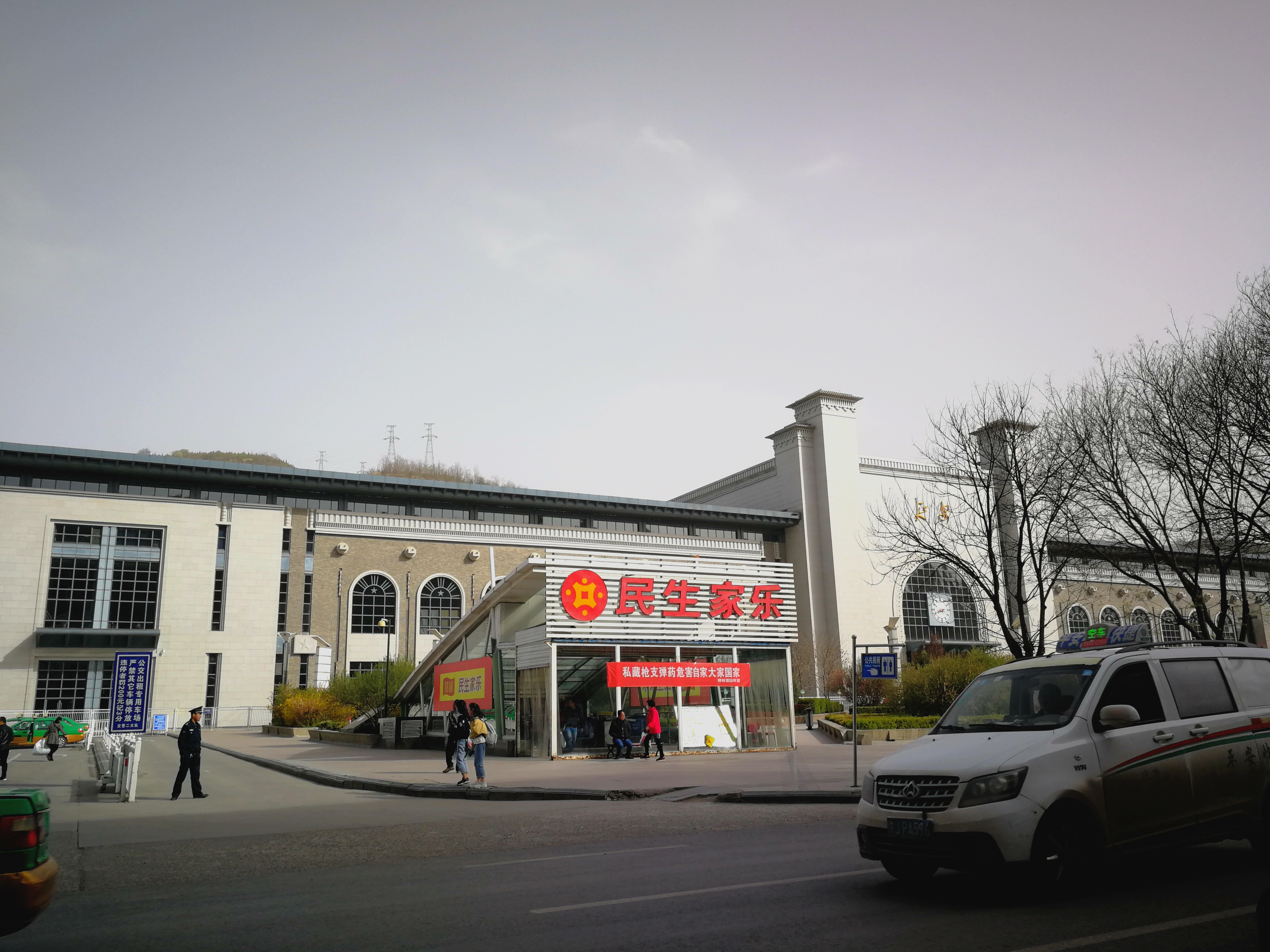
A view of Yan'an railway station, built in 1991

Immediately following the death of Mao Zedong on September 9, 1976, local leaders in Yan'an hoped to continue his policies and the Cultural Revolution. On October 22, 1976, approximately 40,000 people, including many local leaders, partook in a political rally championing the Gang of Four. However, following the Gang of Four's quick downfall, local leaders changed their tune. On January 3, 1977, the Yan'an Municipal Party Committee held a meeting where they deeply criticized the Gang of Four.

On July 6, 1977, a huge flood struck the city, destroying more than 4,100 houses, and killing 134 people. The flooding caused 58 million Renminbi (RMB) in damage, and destroyed the Yan'an Dongguan Bridge built just 18 years earlier. On November 27, 1977, another tragedy struck the city when a bus en route from Yaodian to Yan'an's city center caught fire, killing 48 passengers, and seriously wounding the remaining 19 passengers.

From 1978 through 1980, the Yan'an city government rehabilitated various local politicians and figures who were purged by Maoist elements during the Cultural Revolution. During these three years, the city government reexamined 1,890 instances which took place during the Cultural Revolution, as well as 1,976 cases which took place prior to the Cultural Revolution. In December 1979, the Yan'an Municipal Revolutionary Committee was abolished and replaced by the Yan'an Municipal People's Government (Chinese: 延安市人民政府; pinyin: Yán'ān Shì Rénmín Zhèngfǔ).

On May 9, 1980, an explosion occurred during the construction of a coal mine, killing one person.

At 6 pm on September 5, 1982, a city bus overturned near present-day Qiaogou Subdistrict, injuring 99 people, of which, 27 were seriously injured.

The Yan'an City Department Store (Chinese: 延安市百货大楼; pinyin: Yán'ān Shì Bǎihuò Dàlóu), a 4-story shopping complex spanning an area of 6,000 square metres (65,000 ft^{2}), was opened on August 1, 1983.

On January 29, 1984, an illegal coal mine collapsed, killing two people.

In September 1984, the city's people's commune, a Maoist-era administrative designation, were formally reverted to towns and townships.

On October 19, 1984, the Yan'an Education College (Chinese: 延安教育学院; pinyin: Yán'ān Jiàoyù Xuéyuàn), now a constituent college at Yan'an University, was established.

Two city bus accidents happened in quick succession in November 1987, with one happening on the 22nd, and the other on the 24th. Combined, these accidents killed two and severely injured another person.

Two unusual summer hail storms hit the city in the summer of 1988, one on June 27, and the other on August 25. Combined, these two storms caused 4.11 million RMB in damage.

On January 3, 1989, a large oilfield was discovered in the town of Nanniwan, spanning an estimated area of 500 square kilometres (190 mi^{2}), and containing an estimated 50 million tons of petroleum.

Approximately 5,000 students from the city's colleges, universities, and other schools held a street protest in Yan'an on May 18, 1989, as part of the 1989 Chinese protests. On June 15, the Municipal Party Committee discouraged the protest.

General Secretary Jiang Zemin visited Yan'an in September 1989, Li Ruihuan visited Yan'an on April 16, 1990, and Premier Li Peng followed suit on November 20, 1990.

A ceremony was held at Yan'an railway station on December 26, 1991, to inaugurate the Xi'an - Yan'an Railway. Passenger services on the line commenced on August 1 of the following year.

A large-scale car crash along the Yan'an - Yichuan Highway (Chinese: 延宜公路; pinyin: Yán Yí Gōnglù) in Nanniwan on November 21, 1992, killed 24 people, and injured another 9.

50.92 kilometres (31.64 mi) of electric lines were installed in Yan'an in May 1993. This connected 31 villages to the city's electric grid, and improved the rural electricity connection rate up to 94%.

In October 1993, the Yan'an Jialing Bridge (Chinese: 延安嘉岭大桥; pinyin: Yán'ān Jiālǐng Dàqiáo) was completed and opened to traffic. The bridge spans a length of 181.41 metres (595.2 ft), totals 12 metres (39 ft) wide, and has sidewalks on both sides of the bridge's road.

In November 1996, Yan'an was upgraded to a prefecture-level city, and what was previously Yan'an City was changed to Baota District.

From the 1990s through the mid-2010s, Baota District continued to experience significant population growth. Much of the district's new growth occurred in its city center, although leapfrog development increased throughout the 2000s through the mid-2010s.

== See also ==
- Baota District
- Yan'an
- Yan'an Soviet
