= Yanwu Expressway =

Road in Shaanxi, China

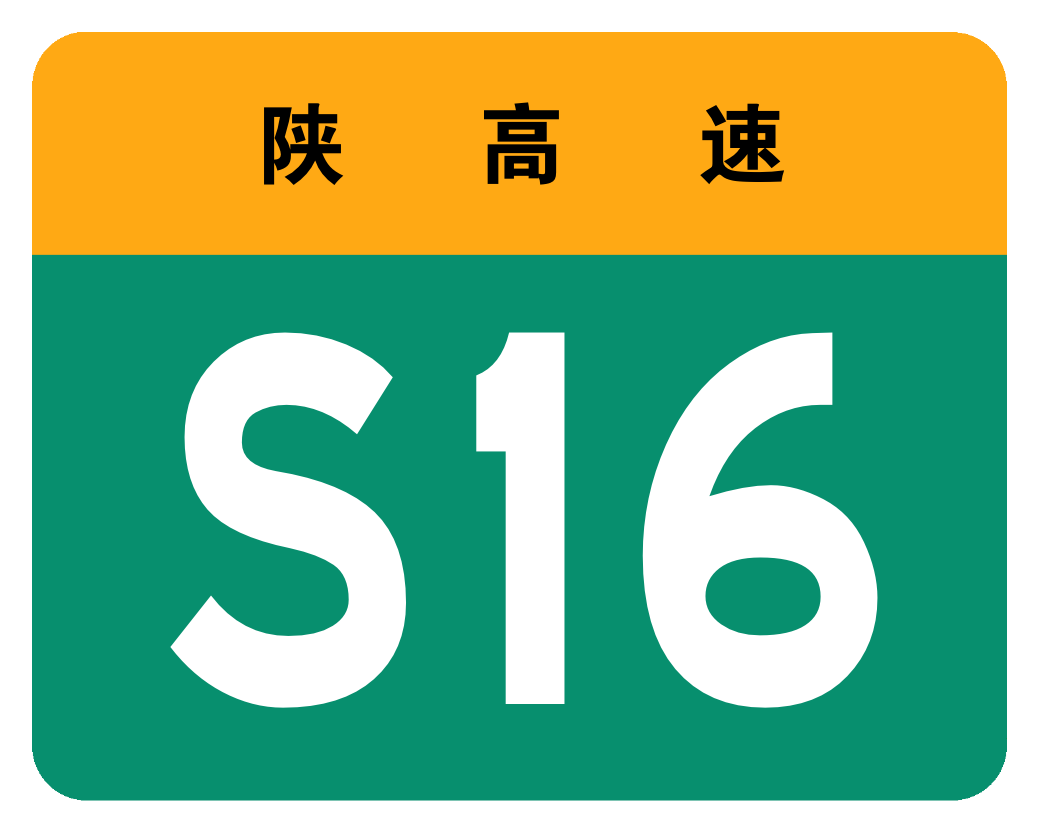
Yanwu Expressway
- 延吴高速公路
- Yan'an-Wuqi Expressway, Yan'an-Zhidan-Wuqi Expressway, Shaanxi Provincial Expressway S16

Route information
- Length: 109.8 km (68.2 mi)
- Existed: December 19, 2013–present

Major junctions
- From: Ansai District
- To: Wuqi County

Location
- Country: China
- Province: Shaanxi
- Counties: Ansai District, Zhidan County, Wuqi County

Highway system
- Shaanxi Provincial Expressway Network

The Yanwu Expressway (Chinese: 延吴高速公路; pinyin: Yán wú gāosù gōnglù), also known as the Yan'an-Wuqi Expressway (Chinese: 延安吴起高速公路; pinyin: Yán'ān Wúqǐ gāosù gōnglù), or the Yan'an-Zhidan-Wuqi Expressway (Chinese: 延安至志丹至吴起高速公路; pinyin: Yán'ān zhì Zhìdān zhì Wúqǐ gāosù gōnglù), or Shaanxi Provincial Expressway S16 (Chinese: 陕高速S16; pinyin: Shǎn gāosù S shí liù) is an expressway in Yan'an, Shaanxi, China. The route traverses the hills of the Loess Plateau in the Shaanbei region, beginning at an interchange with the G65 Baotou-Maoming Expressway in the town of Yanhewan in Ansai District, and travelling through Zhidan County to its terminus in Wuqi County. The expressway's total length is 109.8 kilometres (68.2 mi). Construction started in on December 14, 2008, and on December 19, 2013, construction was completed, and the expressway was opened to traffic. Upon its completion, it became Shaanxi's longest provincial highway by mileage.

== Design ==
The highway has four lanes, a speed limit of 80 kilometres per hour (50 mph), and a roadbed width of 24.5 metres (80 ft). The expressway traverses a total of 202 bridges and 10 tunnels, accounting for 57.2% of the route's total length. Initially, the route was planned to open by the end of 2011, and cost 10.495 billion RMB. Later, its completion date was pushed back to 2012, and its projected total cost was raised to 10.785 billion RMB.

== Route ==
Yanwu Expressway Route (east to west)
| Location | District/County |
|---|---|
| Yanhewan (Chinese: 沿河湾镇) | Ansai District |
| Hougoumen (Chinese: 侯沟门) | Ansai District |
| Zhao'an (Chinese: 招安镇) | Ansai District |
| Gaogoukou (Chinese: 高沟口) | Ansai District |
| Houshi (Chinese: 侯市) | Zhidan County |
| Xuejiagou (Chinese: 薛家沟) | Zhidan County |
| Bao'an (Chinese: 保安街道) | Zhidan County |
| Hanjuzi (Chinese: 韩咀子) | Zhidan County |
| Guangzhong Temple (Chinese: 广中寺) | Zhidan County |
| Yangqingchuan (Chinese: 杨青川) | Wuqi County |
| Xigouta (Chinese: 西沟塔) | Wuqi County |
| Zoumatai (Chinese: 走马台) | Wuqi County |
| Luanshitouchuan (Chinese: 乱石头川) | Wuqi County |
| Liangtai (Chinese: 梁台) | Wuqi County |
