= Huangling County =

Coordinates: 35°34′47″N 109°15′47″E

Huangling 黄陵县
- County
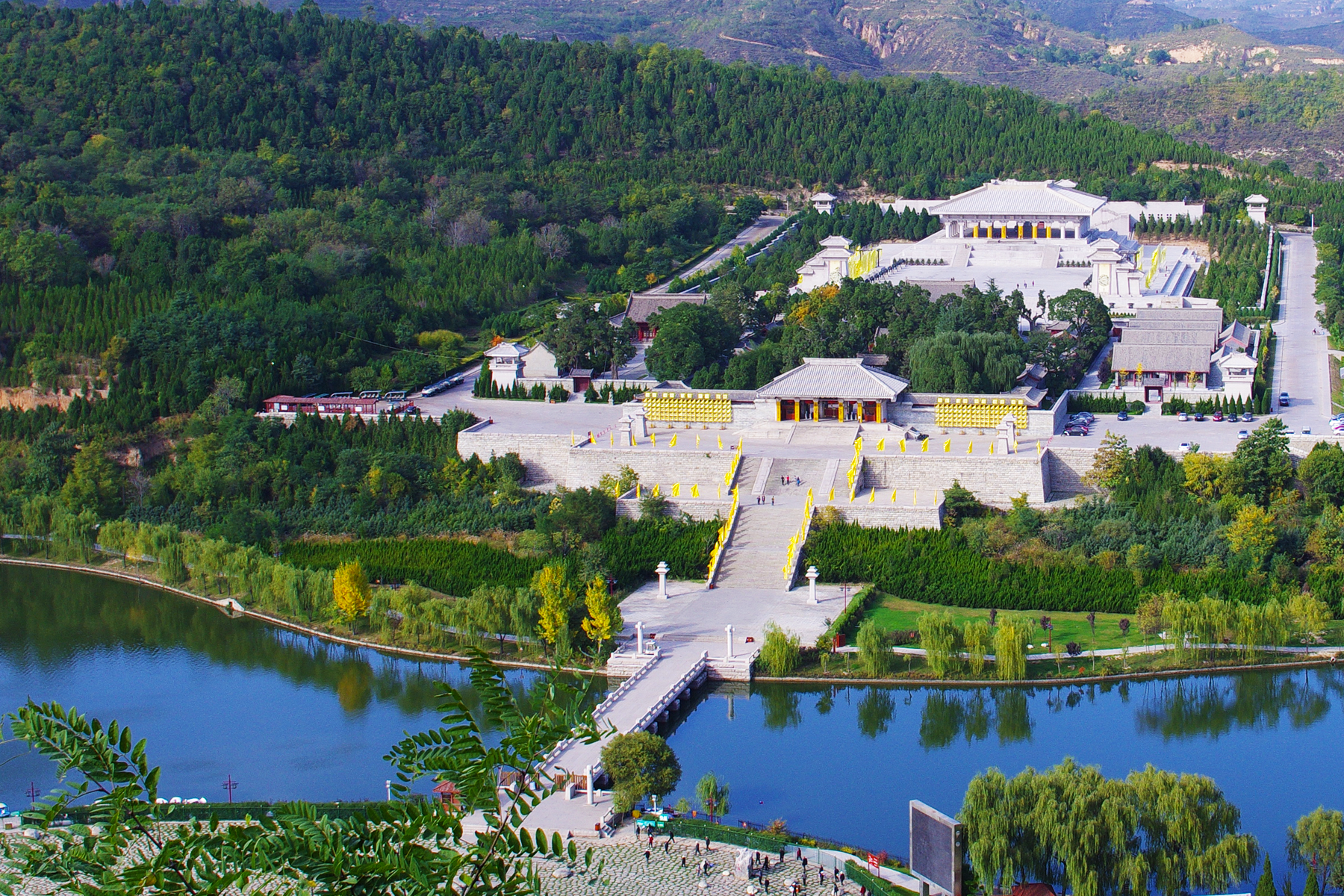
- Xuanyuan Temple at the Mausoleum of the Yellow Emperor

- Huangling in Yan'an

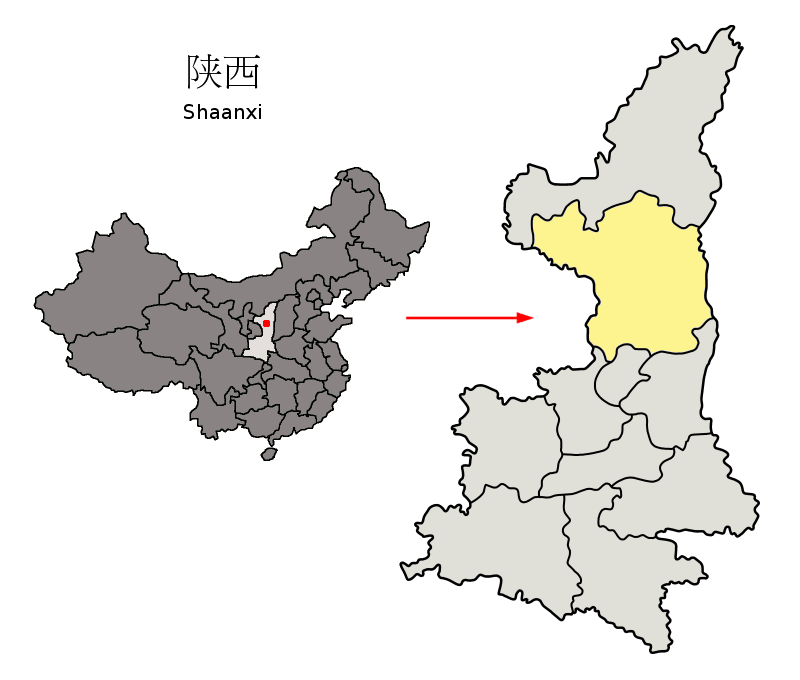
- Yan'an in Shaanxi
- Country: People's Republic of China
- Province: Shaanxi
- Prefecture-level city: Yan'an

Area
  - Total: 2,286.7 km^{2} (882.9 sq mi)

Population (2017)
  - Total: 130,100
  - Density: 56.89/km^{2} (147.4/sq mi)
- Time zone: UTC+8 (China standard time)
- Postal code: 727300
- Licence plates: 陕J

Huangling County (simplified Chinese: 黄陵县; traditional Chinese: 黃陵縣; pinyin: Huánglíng Xiàn) is a county in the north of Shaanxi province, China, bordering Gansu province to the west. It is under the administration of the prefecture-level city of Yan'an. The county spans an area of 2,286.7 square kilometres (882.9 mi^{2}), and has a permanent population of 130,100 people as of 2012.

== Etymology ==
The county is named after the Mausoleum of the Yellow Emperor (simplified Chinese: 黄帝陵; traditional Chinese: 黃帝陵; pinyin: Huángdì Líng).

== Administrative divisions ==
Huangling County is divided into one subdistrict and five towns. The county's sole subdistrict is Qiaoshan Subdistrict, and its five towns are Diantou, Longfang, Tianzhuang, Adang, and Shuanglong. The county government is located in Qiaoshan Subdistrict.

== Geography ==
Huangling County is located in the Loess Plateau approximately 200 kilometres (120 mi) north of Xi'an's urban core, and 170 kilometres (110 mi) south of Yan'an's. Over 70% of the county is forested.

== Climate ==
Climate data for Huangling, elevation 863 m (2,831 ft), (1991–2020 normals, extremes 1991–present)
Month	Jan	Feb	Mar	Apr	May	Jun	Jul	Aug	Sep	Oct	Nov	Dec	Year
Record high °C (°F)	15.8 (60.4)	21.1 (70.0)	30.5 (86.9)	32.5 (90.5)	36.9 (98.4)	37.5 (99.5)	39.2 (102.6)	36.0 (96.8)	32.5 (90.5)	29.9 (85.8)	24.3 (75.7)	16.6 (61.9)	39.2 (102.6)
Mean daily maximum °C (°F)	4.1 (39.4)	8.2 (46.8)	15.2 (59.4)	21.5 (70.7)	25.9 (78.6)	29.3 (84.7)	30.1 (86.2)	28.8 (83.8)	23.4 (74.1)	18.4 (65.1)	11.8 (53.2)	5.6 (42.1)	18.5 (65.3)
Daily mean °C (°F)	−3.2 (26.2)	0.7 (33.3)	7.4 (45.3)	13.4 (56.1)	17.9 (64.2)	21.9 (71.4)	23.8 (74.8)	22.6 (72.7)	17.4 (63.3)	11.5 (52.7)	4.7 (40.5)	−1.8 (28.8)	11.4 (52.4)
Mean daily minimum °C (°F)	−8.6 (16.5)	−4.8 (23.4)	0.9 (33.6)	6.3 (43.3)	10.9 (51.6)	15.5 (59.9)	18.8 (65.8)	18.1 (64.6)	13.2 (55.8)	6.6 (43.9)	−0.2 (31.6)	−7.1 (19.2)	5.8 (42.4)
Record low °C (°F)	−19.5 (−3.1)	−16.7 (1.9)	−10.8 (12.6)	−5.0 (23.0)	1.5 (34.7)	7.6 (45.7)	11.4 (52.5)	9.1 (48.4)	3.1 (37.6)	−2.2 (28.0)	−11.3 (11.7)	−20.5 (−4.9)	−20.5 (−4.9)
Average precipitation mm (inches)	5.3 (0.21)	9.7 (0.38)	17.4 (0.69)	32.7 (1.29)	48.7 (1.92)	67.2 (2.65)	131.1 (5.16)	101.3 (3.99)	94.0 (3.70)	40.8 (1.61)	16.9 (0.67)	2.0 (0.08)	567.1 (22.35)
Average precipitation days (≥ 0.1 mm)	2.6	4.2	4.4	6.1	7.9	8.9	11.9	10.3	11.6	8.6	5.4	1.6	83.5
Average snowy days	4.3	4.8	1.8	0.2	0	0	0	0	0	0	1.6	2.6	15.3
Average relative humidity (%)	54	57	50	52	57	63	73	76	79	73	66	56	63
Mean monthly sunshine hours	140.3	134.5	165.1	176.1	190.9	171.2	161.6	155.6	121.9	137.7	141.0	151.6	1,847.5
Percentage possible sunshine	45	43	44	45	44	39	37	38	33	40	46	50	42
Source: China Meteorological Administration

== History ==
Archeoligcal evidence from the ancient Yangshao culture indicates that the area of present-day Huangling County has been inhabited since the Neolithic age. In 221 BCE, the Qin dynasty unified a number of small counties in the area under the Shang Commandery. The area was reorganized a number of times before being occupied by the Xiongnu in 189 CE. The Jin dynasty then conquered the area and briefly reorganized it as the Central Commandery. The area of present-day Huangling County would be re-organized a number of times under the Northern Zhou dynasty, the Tang dynasty, the Song dynasty, the Ming dynasty, and, ultimately, the Qing dynasty. During the time of the Republic of China, the area was a part of Yulin Circuit, one of the three circuits in Shaanxi. The area would fall under control of the People's Republic of China by May 1948. Named Huangling County since 1944, the jurisdiction has since undergone a number of restructurings, with its most recent being in 2015.

== Economy ==
In 2011, the county's GDP was 8.356 billion Renminbi, which the county government forecasted to increase to 11.86 billion by 2015. The county has an apple-growing area of 210,000 mu, producing an annual output of 270,000 tons of apples. Huangling County has proven coal reserves of 2.7 billion tons, with an annual output of 29 million tons of raw coal. The county also has petroleum reserves.

== Historical sites ==
The Mausoleum of the Yellow Emperor, built to honor the legendary Yellow Emperor, is located within Huangling County. The complex's structures were built throughout various times in history, with the oldest portions of the mausoleum exceeding 2,000 years in age.

== Transportation ==
- China National Highway 210
- G65 Baotou–Maoming Expressway
- Xi'an–Yan'an Railway
