= Yanwu =

Yanwu could refer to:

- Gu Yanwu (Chinese: 顧炎武; 1613–1682), Chinese historian and poet
- Yanwu Bridge (Chinese: 演武大桥), a bridge in Xiamen, Fujian province, China
- Yanwu Expressway (Chinese: 延吴高速公路), an expressway in Yan'an, Shaanxi province, China
