= Gaonu County =

Ancient Chinese county

Gaonu County (simplified Chinese: 高奴县; traditional Chinese: 高奴縣; pinyin: Gāonú Xiàn) was an ancient Chinese county under the jurisdiction of Shang Commandery in present-day northern Shaanxi. The county was established in the Qin dynasty, during the reign of Qin Shi Huang. Iterations of Gaonu County continued until the latter Eastern Han period, albeit interrupted by rebellions and invasions. The location of Gaonu County corresponds to present-day Baota District and Ansai District within Yan'an. During the Qin dynasty and the Han dynasty, Gaonu County served as an important regional center within present-day Yan'an.

== History ==
In 328 BCE, the Qin state took land corresponding to present-day Baota District from the Wei state. Subsequently, during the rule of Emperor Qin Shihuang, the area was organized as Gaonu County beginning in 221 BCE, and was placed under the jurisdiction of the Shang Commandery.

In 206 BCE, following the collapse of the Qin, Gaonu County was taken by forces belonging to Xiang Yu during the Chu–Han Contention. However, just six months later, armies belonging to Emperor Gaozu of the Han dynasty retook Gaonu County. From 177 BCE to 117 BCE, invading Xiongnu forces invaded the Shang Commandery numerous times as part of the Han–Xiongnu War, and Gaonu County changed hands several times. During the Qin dynasty, general Meng Tian supervised the construction of roads in Gaonu County which led northward to present-day Yulin and Inner Mongolia.

The Commentary on the Water Classic, written by Li Daoyuan, has a passage which says that Gaonu County has a form of "combustible" water, which would turn out to be petroleum. This was corroborated in the later Miscellaneous Morsels from Youyang, written by Duan Chengshi, which states that Gaonu County was known to have "greasy" water which was burned for use in lamps.

In 9 CE, Gaonu County was renamed to Pingli County (simplified Chinese: 平利县; traditional Chinese: 平利縣; pinyin: Pínglì Xiàn). Shortly afterwards, during the early Eastern Han period, it was renamed Gaonu County. However, near the end of the Eastern Han period, Gaonu County would be permanently abolished.

== Demographics ==
A census carried out during the final years of the Western Han period counted 52,752 people in Gaonu County.
