= Heilongdawang Temple =

Religion
- Affiliation: Chinese folk religion

Location
- Location: Shaanxi, China

Architecture
- Style: Chinese temple architecture
- Completed: 1982, current building

The Heilongdawang Temple (literally Temple of the Great Black Dragon King) is a prominent Chinese folk temple located in Northern Shaanxi. The temple enshrines the Black Dragon King with the imperially conferred title of Marquis of the Efficacious Response (灵应侯; Língyīnghóu). Dragon kings (龙王; lóng wáng) are water deities popular in droughty Northern China.

The temple was completely destroyed during the anti-religious campaigns of the Cultural Revolution, but rebuilt from scratch in 1982, and since then has enjoyed growing popularity in Northern Shaanxi, becoming a case study of the revival of Chinese folk religion in sociological research, as hundreds of thousands of pilgrims and other visitors come for the annual six-day festival. The temple is located in an area known as the Dragon King Valley (Longwanggou).

== Sources ==
- Fan Lizhu, Chen Na. The Revival of Indigenous Religion in China. Fudan University, 2013. p. 11
- Adam Yuet Chau. "The Politics of Legitimation and the Revival of Popular Religion in Shaanbei, North-Central China", in Modern China, Vol. 31, No. 2 (April 2005), pp. 236–278. Sage Publications, Inc.

== See also ==
- Chinese folk religion
