= Yongning, Shaanxi =

Yongning 永宁镇
- Town
- Location in China
- Coordinates: 36°33′15″N 108°46′17″E
- Country: People's Republic of China
- Province: Shaanxi
- Prefecture-level city: Yan'an
- County: Zhidan County

Area
  - Total: 810.40 km^{2} (312.90 sq mi)

Population (2018)
  - Total: 14,282
  - Density: 17.623/km^{2} (45.644/sq mi)
- Time zone: UTC+8 (China Standard)

Yongning (simplified Chinese: 永宁; traditional Chinese: 永寧; pinyin: Yǒngníng) is a town under the administration of Zhidan County, Shaanxi, China. As of 2018, it has 14 villages under its administration. The town spans an area of 810.40 square kilometres (312.90 mi^{2}), and has a hukou population of 14,282 as of 2018.

== See also ==
- List of township-level divisions of Shaanxi
