= Yan'an University =

Educational institution in Shanxi, China

Coordinates: 36°37′56″N 109°27′10″E

Yanan University 延安大学
- Motto: 立身为公 学以致用 (To serve the public good and to apply knowledge in practice)
- Type: Public university; Higher education institution jointly established by the province and the ministry; Key universities in Shaanxi Province
- Established: 1941
- Affiliations: Shaanxi Provincial People's Government; Ministry of Education of the People's Republic of China
- President: Gao Ziwei
- Students: 19,832 (year 2021)
- Location: No. 580, Shengdi Road, Yan'an City, Shaanxi Province China
- Website: www.yau.edu.cn

Yan'an University (simplified Chinese: 延安大学; traditional Chinese: 延安大學; pinyin: Yán'ān Dàxué) was the first comprehensive university founded by the Chinese Communist Party for the purpose of cultivating senior cadres. It is now a high-level university under construction in Shaanxi Province and jointly run by the Provincial Government and the Ministry of Education of the People's Republic of China. Yan'an University is located in Yan'an City, Shaanxi Province, China.

== Historical Development ==
=== Early Stage ===
In July 1941, the Zedong Youth Cadre School (established in May 1940), the China Women's University (established in July 1939) and the Shaanbei Public School (established in October 1937) merged to form Yan'an University, with Wu Yuzhang as president. It was under the leadership of the Central Cultural Committee of the Chinese Communist Party. The very name of the university was bestowed by Mao Zedong.

On March 16, 1943, Yan'an University, the Lu Xun Academy of Arts, the Yan'an Academy of Natural Sciences, the Nationalities Institute, and the New Literature Cadre School merged, retaining the name "Yan'an University", with Wu Yuzhang as president.

On April 7, 1944, Yan'an University merged with the Administrative College (established in July 1940), with Zhou Yang becoming the president.

In September 1945, the Lu Xun Academy of Arts, the Yan'an Academy of Natural Sciences moved to Northeast China. The remaining campus was reduced in size, with departments and classes reorganized.

In June 1948, a branch campus was established in Luochuan.

On May 23, 1949, the main campus and branch campus of Yan'an University, the Northwest People's Art School, and the Northwest Finance and Economics School merged to form the Northwest People's Revolutionary University, and gradually relocated to Xi'an.

=== Reconstruction ===
In July 1958, the Shaanxi Provincial People's Government decided to rebuild a new Yan'an University, which officially opened in Yan'an in September.

In 1966, the Cultural Revolution started, severely disrupting the university's teaching and learning order.

On September 30, 1971, Yan'an University merged with Beijing Agricultural University, retaining the name "Yan'an University." On March 6, 1972, following instructions from the State Council, the two universities were separated, and the faculty and students of the former Beijing Agricultural University moved back to Beijing.

In 1978, Yan'an Medical College was established on the basis of the original Yan'an University medical department.

In 1998, Yan'an University merged with Yan'an Medical College and Yan'an People's Hospital to form the new Yan'an University. At this time, Yan'an University became a key comprehensive university under the jurisdiction of Shaanxi Province.

On June 9, 2005, the Shaanxi Provincial People's Government and the Ministry of Education start to jointly run Yan'an University.

In 2011, the university was listed as a high-level university under construction in Shaanxi Province.

In 2018, Yan'an University became a first-tier university in Shaanxi Province. Since then, all undergraduate programs at the university would admit students in Shaanxi based on the first-tier university admission score.

In 2024, Yan'an University was approved as a doctoral degree-granting institution. By then, the university had three disciplines that had entered the top 1% of ESI: Chemistry, Engineering, and Clinical Medicine.

== Schools and colleges ==
Yan'an University consists of the following schools and colleges:

- School of Literature and Journalism
- School of Political Science and Law and Public Administration
- School of History and Culture
- Lu Xun Academy of Arts
- School of Economics and Management
- School of Physical Education
- School of Foreign Languages
- School of Mathematics and Computer Science
- School of Physics and Electronic Information
- School of Chemistry and Chemical Engineering
- School of Life Sciences
- School of Petroleum Engineering and Environmental Engineering
- School of Architectural Engineering
- School of Educational Sciences
- School of Marxism
- Yan'an Medical College
- School of International Exchange and Education
- School of Continuing Education
- Institute of Rural Development
- Xi'an Innovation College

== Notable alumni ==
They include

- Ai Qing, male (1910-1996), originally named Jiang Chenghai, was a famous writer.
- Ai Siqi (1910 – 1966), was a famous Marxist philosopher.
- Cai Chang, female (1900 - 1990), was a famous politician.
- Cai Cheng (1927 – 2009), from Puning County, Guangdong Province, was a famous politician.
- Chen Changhao (1906 - 1967), was a senior commander of the Chinese Red Army.

== Other information ==
The university enrolls students nationwide and has over 20,000 local and international students.

The University Library holds 1.84 million volumes, making it the largest library and information center in Northern Shaanxi.

The Journal of Yan'an University (Social Sciences Edition) has been recognized as an outstanding journal among universities in Shaanxi and nationwide.

Campus Address: No. 580, Shengdi Road, Yan'an City, Shaanxi Province.

== See also ==
- Yan'an
- Shaanxi
