= Zhangguanmiao =

Zhangguanmiao 长官庙镇
- Town
- Location within China
- Coordinates: 36°47′24″N 108°0′34″E
- Country: China
- Province: Shaanxi
- Prefecture-level city: Yan'an
- County: Wuqi County

Area
  - Total: 244.70 km^{2} (94.48 sq mi)
- Elevation: 1,404 m (4,606 ft)

Population (2018)
  - Total: 6,508
  - Density: 26.60/km^{2} (68.88/sq mi)

Zhangguanmiao (Chinese: 长官庙; pinyin: Zhǎngguānmiào) is a town in Wuqi County, Yan'an, Shaanxi, China. The town spans an area of 224.70 square kilometres (86.76 sq mi), and has a hukou population of 6,508 as of 2018. Zhangguanmiao has a coal station.

== Administrative divisions ==
As of 2020, Zhangguanmiao administers the following seven villages:

- Zhangguanmiao Village (长官庙村)
- Qiqiao Village (齐桥村)
- Ligou Village (李沟村)
- Liangcha Village (梁岔村)
- Qingliangsi Village (清梁寺村)
- Baigou Village (白沟村)
- Yangtai Village (阳台村)

== See also ==
- List of township-level divisions of Shaanxi
- Wuqi County
