= Shang Commandery =

Historical political subdivision in China

Shang Commandery (Chinese: 上郡; lit. 'Upper Commandery') was a historical commandery of China. It was located in modern-day Northern Shaanxi.

The commandery was established during the reign of Marquess Wen of Wei. In 328 BC, it was annexed by the Qin state. The seat was Fushi (膚施), to the south of modern Yulin, Shaanxi. During the Chu–Han Contention, Shang was granted to Dong Yi, a Qin general who received the title "King of Di" from Xiang Yu. After Dong's defeat in 205 BC, the territory became part of Han.

In late Western Han dynasty, Shang included 23 counties, namely Fushi (膚施), Dule (獨樂), Yangzhou (陽周), Muhe (木禾), Pingdu (平都), Qianshui (淺水), Jingshi (京室), Luodu (洛都), Baitu (白土), Xiangluo (襄洛), Yuandu (原都), Qiyuan (漆垣), Sheyan (奢延), Diaoyin (雕陰), Tuixie (推邪), Zhenlin (楨林), Gaowang (高望), Diaoyindao (雕陰道), Qiuci (龜茲), Dingyang (定陽), Gaonu (高奴), Wangsong (望松) and Yidu (宜都). The population was 606,658, in 103,683 households in 2 AD. By 140 AD in Eastern Han, the number of counties had decreased to 10, and the population to 28,599, in 5,169 households. Toward the end Han dynasty, the area's population decreased sharply as residents fled from invading northern nomadic peoples, and the commandery was dissolved.

In the Sui and Tang dynasties, the name Dingxiang Commandery was revived to refer to Fu (敷, 鄜) prefecture. Fu Prefecture in Sui dynasty administered 5 counties, and 53,489 households In 741 AD, the population was 153,714, in 23,484 households.
