= Wuqi County =

Wuqi 吴起县
- County
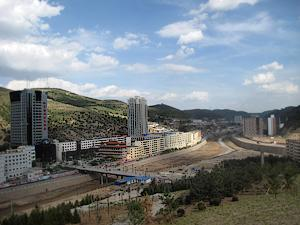
- Wuqi County's urban center

- Wuqi County in Yan'an
- Coordinates (Wuqi County government): 36°55′39″N 108°10′35″E
- Country: People's Republic of China
- Province: Shaanxi
- Prefecture-level city: Yan'an

Area
  - Total: 3,788.5 km^{2} (1,462.7 sq mi)

Population (2012)
  - Total: 145,600
  - Density: 38.43/km^{2} (99.54/sq mi)
- Time zone: UTC+8 (China standard time)
- Postal code: 717600
- Licence plates: 陕J

Wuqi County (simplified Chinese: 吴起县; traditional Chinese: 吳起縣; pinyin: Wúqǐ Xiàn) is a county under the jurisdiction of Yan'an City, in the northwest of Shaanxi Province, China, bordering Gansu province to the southwest. The county spans an area of 3,788.5 square kilometres (1,462.7 mi^{2}), and has a population of 145,600 as of 2012.

== Administrative divisions ==
The county is divided into 1 subdistrict and 8 towns.

Zoning Code	English name	Hanzi	Pinyin
610626001000	Wuqi Subdistrict	吴起街道	Wúqǐ Jiēdào
610626101000	Tiebiancheng	铁边城镇	Tiěbiānchéng Zhèn
610626102000	Zhouwan	周湾镇	Zhōuwān Zhèn
610626103000	Baibao	白豹镇	Báibào Zhèn
610626104000	Zhangguanmiao	长官庙镇	Zhǎngguānmiào Zhèn
610626105000	Changcheng	长城镇	Chángchéng Zhèn
610626106000	Wugucheng	五谷城镇	Wǔgǔchéng Zhèn
610626107000	Wucangbao	吴仓堡镇	Wúcāngbǎo Zhèn
610626108000	Miaogou	庙沟镇	Miàogōu Zhèn

== Geography ==
Wuqi is adjacent to Dingbian County in the northwest, Zhidan County in the southeast, Jingbian County in the northeast, and Huachi County in Gansu Province in the southwest. The county's two main rivers are the Wuding River and the Beiluo River. The region is largely hilly, with the terrain's altitude varying from 1,233 metres (4,045 ft) to 1,809 metres (5,935 ft) in height.

=== Climate ===
The county has warm, wet summers, and cool, dry winters. The county's minimum recorded temperature was −25.1 °C (−13.2 °F), maximum recorded temperature was 37.1 °C (98.8 °F), and has an average annual temperature of 7.8 °C (46.0 °F). The county's average annual precipitation is 483.4 millimetres (19.03 in).

Climate data for Wuqi, elevation 1,331 m (4,367 ft), (1991–2020 normals, extremes 1981–2010)
Month	Jan	Feb	Mar	Apr	May	Jun	Jul	Aug	Sep	Oct	Nov	Dec	Year
Record high °C (°F)	16.1 (61.0)	19.9 (67.8)	28.1 (82.6)	33.6 (92.5)	34.6 (94.3)	36.7 (98.1)	38.3 (100.9)	34.0 (93.2)	33.7 (92.7)	28.0 (82.4)	23.2 (73.8)	15.5 (59.9)	38.3 (100.9)
Mean daily maximum °C (°F)	1.8 (35.2)	5.8 (42.4)	11.9 (53.4)	18.9 (66.0)	23.7 (74.7)	27.7 (81.9)	28.8 (83.8)	26.8 (80.2)	21.8 (71.2)	16.1 (61.0)	9.6 (49.3)	3.3 (37.9)	16.4 (61.4)
Daily mean °C (°F)	−7.2 (19.0)	−2.8 (27.0)	3.5 (38.3)	10.5 (50.9)	15.8 (60.4)	20.2 (68.4)	22.0 (71.6)	20.3 (68.5)	15.0 (59.0)	8.2 (46.8)	1.1 (34.0)	−5.5 (22.1)	8.4 (47.2)
Mean daily minimum °C (°F)	−13.6 (7.5)	−9.2 (15.4)	−3.2 (26.2)	2.9 (37.2)	8.2 (46.8)	13 (55)	16.4 (61.5)	15.4 (59.7)	10.1 (50.2)	2.7 (36.9)	−4.7 (23.5)	−11.6 (11.1)	2.2 (35.9)
Record low °C (°F)	−26.3 (−15.3)	−22.6 (−8.7)	−18.3 (−0.9)	−9.9 (14.2)	−3.3 (26.1)	4.0 (39.2)	7.3 (45.1)	5.0 (41.0)	−3.1 (26.4)	−11.1 (12.0)	−17.8 (0.0)	−28.5 (−19.3)	−28.5 (−19.3)
Average precipitation mm (inches)	2.9 (0.11)	4.7 (0.19)	10.7 (0.42)	23.8 (0.94)	37.8 (1.49)	53.4 (2.10)	103.6 (4.08)	111.6 (4.39)	69.2 (2.72)	30.4 (1.20)	11.8 (0.46)	2.3 (0.09)	462.2 (18.19)
Average precipitation days (≥ 0.1 mm)	2.7	3.5	4.3	5.7	7.4	9.2	12.5	12.9	10.6	8.0	4.5	1.8	83.1
Average snowy days	5.2	5.7	4.0	1.0	0	0	0	0	0	1.0	3.5	4.2	24.6
Average relative humidity (%)	55	52	49	46	49	56	67	72	74	70	63	57	59
Mean monthly sunshine hours	202.0	188.0	220.2	234.2	255.4	248.6	237.1	213.4	171.4	189.9	192.9	197.6	2,550.7
Percentage possible sunshine	65	61	59	59	58	57	54	51	47	55	64	66	58
Source: China Meteorological Administration

== History ==
On October 19, 1935, forces belonging to the Chinese Soviet Republic captured the area. An account of Wuqi (Wu Ch'i, in Wade-Giles Romanization) in 1936 can be found in Edgar Snow's "Red Star over China". At the time, it was the main industrial center of the communist-controlled Shaanxi/Gansu/Ningxia borderlands area, This is where the Red Army's arsenal. cloth, uniform, shoe and stockings factories were at the time. As Edgar Snow noted, the arsenal's products were mostly used to arm the Red guerilla fighters, while the regular Red Army units mostly used weapons captured from the enemy (Kuomintang and warlord) troops. The area was a part of the Shaan-Gan-Ning Border Region.

== Economy ==
As of 2016, Wuqi County had a GDP of 10.8 billion Renminbi. The county's urban residents had a per capita disposable income of 32,883 Yuan, and its agrarian residents had one of 11,538 Yuan.

=== Natural resources ===
The county has deposits of a number of minerals, including coal, petroleum, and gypsum.

== Transportation ==
The county is home the Yan'an-Dingbian Road. The western terminus of the Yanwu Expressway is located in the county.
