= Bao'an Subdistrict, Zhidan County =

Bao'an Subdistrict 保安街道
- Subdistrict
- Interactive map of Bao'an Subdistrict
- Coordinates: 36°49′36″N 108°45′37″E
- Country: China
- Province: Shaanxi
- Prefecture-level city: Yan'an
- County: Zhidan

Population
  - Total: 60,371

Bao'an Subdistrict (Chinese: 保安街道; pinyin: Bǎo'ān Jiēdào), formerly transliterated Pao An, is a subdistrict in Zhidan County, Yan'an, Shaanxi Province, China.

In 2015, the Shaanxi provincial department of civil affairs officially agreed to eliminate the former Bao'an Town and establish Bao'an Subdistrict.

== Administrative divisions ==
Bao'an Subdistrict includes the following administrative divisions: Qiaonan Community (桥南社区, lit. "south of the bridge"), Qiaobei Community (桥北社区, lit. "north of the bridge"), Zhongxinjie Community (中心街社区, lit. "central street"), Hongdu Community (红都社区), Linghuangditai Community (灵皇地台社区), Chengguan Village (城关村), Madiping Village (麻地坪村), Xiyanggou Village (西阳沟村), Shadaozi Village (沙道子村), Xiwugou Village (西武沟村), Fengpo Village (冯坡村), Hezui Village (贺咀村), Suncha Village (孙岔村), Yangpan Village (杨畔村), Haogou Village (壕沟村), Zhaogelao Village (赵圪劳村), Dongwugou Village (东武沟村), Xinyaowan Village (新窑湾村), Zhanggoumen Village (张沟门村), Yangtiao Village (杨条村), and Macha Village (马岔村).

== See also ==
- List of township-level divisions of Shaanxi
