= Mausoleum of the Yellow Emperor =

Tomb in Shaanxi Province, China

Coordinates: 35°34′44″N 109°15′59″E

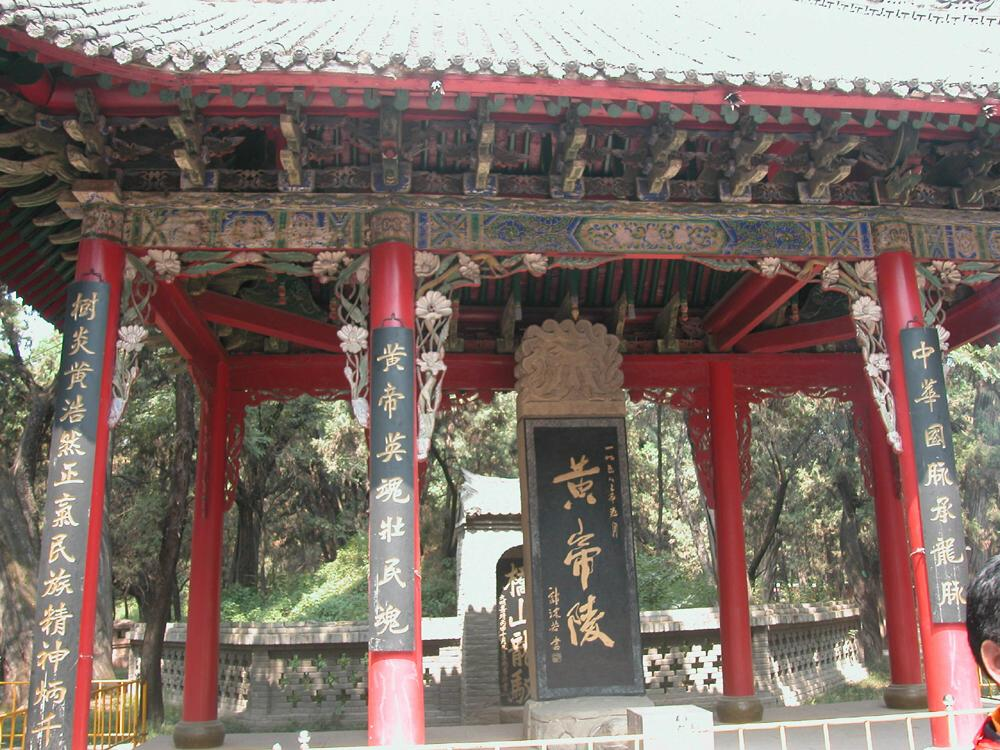
Tomb of the Yellow Emperor.

The Mausoleum of the Yellow Emperor (simplified Chinese: 黄帝陵; traditional Chinese: 黃帝陵; pinyin: Huángdì Líng) is the alleged burial site of the legendary Yellow Emperor (Huangdi) of China. It is located in Huangling County, Yan'an City, Shaanxi Province, China. According to legend, the Yellow Emperor attained immortality and rose to Heaven, leaving behind only his clothing and cap to be entombed.

The mausoleum is located on Qiao Mountain, north of Yan'an proper. In 1961, the Chinese State Council proclaimed it as the first National State-Protected Great Cultural Site, with the identifier "Ancient Tomb #1" and the moniker "The First Tomb Under Heaven". The mausoleum was anciently called "Qiao Tomb", and was an important location where generations of emperors and famous people made offerings to the Yellow Emperor.

According to historical records, the earliest offerings to the Yellow Emperor at the mausoleum's location began in 442 BCE. From the establishment of a shrine proper in the year 770 CE during the Tang dynasty, it was the scene of regular national offerings and sacrifices. The site has been rebuilt and restored several times, most recently beginning in 1993. The Yellow Emperor Mausoleum Foundation was established to raise money for the reconstruction process, which was divided into two phases. The first phase was completed in August 2001, and in 2004 yearly national offerings to the Yellow Emperor at the mausoleum resumed.

== Scenic area ==
The Yellow Emperor Mausoleum Scenic Area covers an area of approximately 333 hectares and is classified as a highest level scenic area by the China National Tourism Administration. It contains over 60,000 mature cypress trees, of which 30,000 are over one thousand years old, making the area one of the best old cypress forests in China. The scenic area is divided into two parts: the Huangdi tomb area and the Xuanyuan Temple area.

=== Tomb area ===
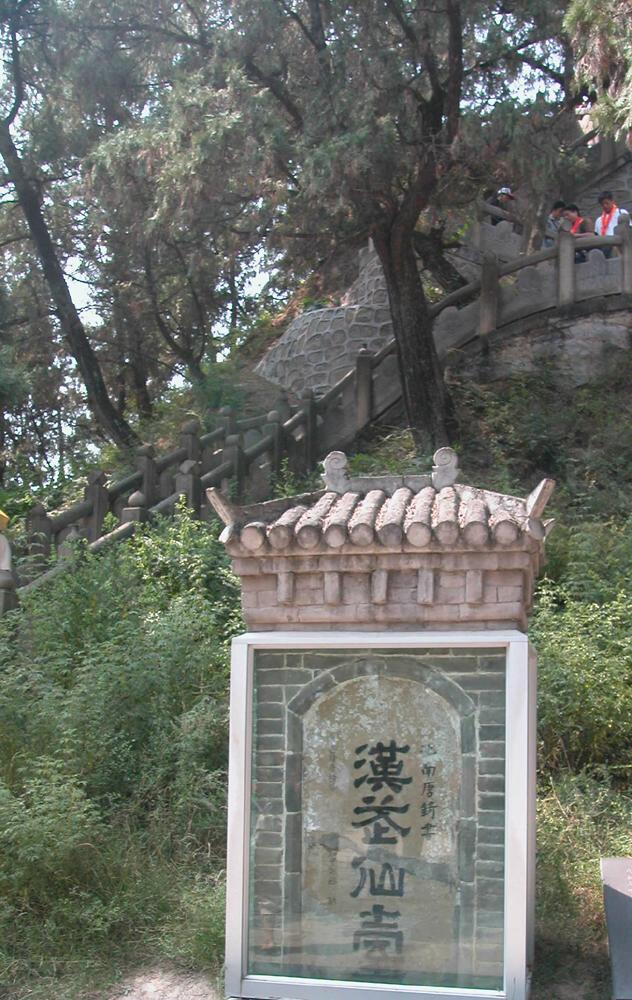
"Immortal Han Wu Altar" (漢武仙台).

On the right side of the stone path leading to the Tomb Area lies a stone entitled the "Horse-Dismounting Stone" (下马石). Upon the stone is written in Chinese calligraphy the words "Wen and Wu and their officials arrived at this point and dismounted their horses" (文武官员至此下马), a reference to Kings Wen and Wu of the Zhou dynasty. Nearer to the Tomb lies the "Immortal Han Wu Altar".

According to tradition, as Emperor Wu of the Han dynasty was returning from a northern campaign against the Xiongnu, he stopped at the mausoleum and made offerings.

The current mausoleum is 3.6 meters tall, 48 meters in circumference, and is surrounded by a brick wall. On the south side stands a Ming dynasty stone stele that reads "Qiao Mountain Dragon Rider" (橋山龍馭), a reference to the story of the Yellow Emperor and his family riding into the west on a golden dragon. The eastern side's stele hallway preserves 57 Imperial stele commissioned by various emperors. On the western side stands the returned commemoration stele from Hong Kong and Macao.

In the main hall, called the "Great Hall of Man and Civilization's First Ancestor" (人文初祖大殿), stands a relief sculpture of the Yellow Emperor, as well as a niche shrine decorated with the four great spirit animals of Chinese astrology: the Azure Dragon, the White Tiger, the Vermilion Bird, and the Black Tortoise. In the memorial pavilion are arranged several dedicatory inscriptions from modern Chinese leaders Sun Yat-sen, Chiang Kai-shek, Mao Zedong, and Deng Xiaoping. In front of the tomb is a pavilion for offerings, in the middle of which stands a stone stele with the three Chinese characters "Yellow Emperor Mausoleum" (黄帝陵). The stele was erected by Chiang Kai-shek during the Second Sino-Japanese War but was chiseled blank in 1956 before being restored in 1963 by Guo Moruo.

=== Xuanyuan Temple ===
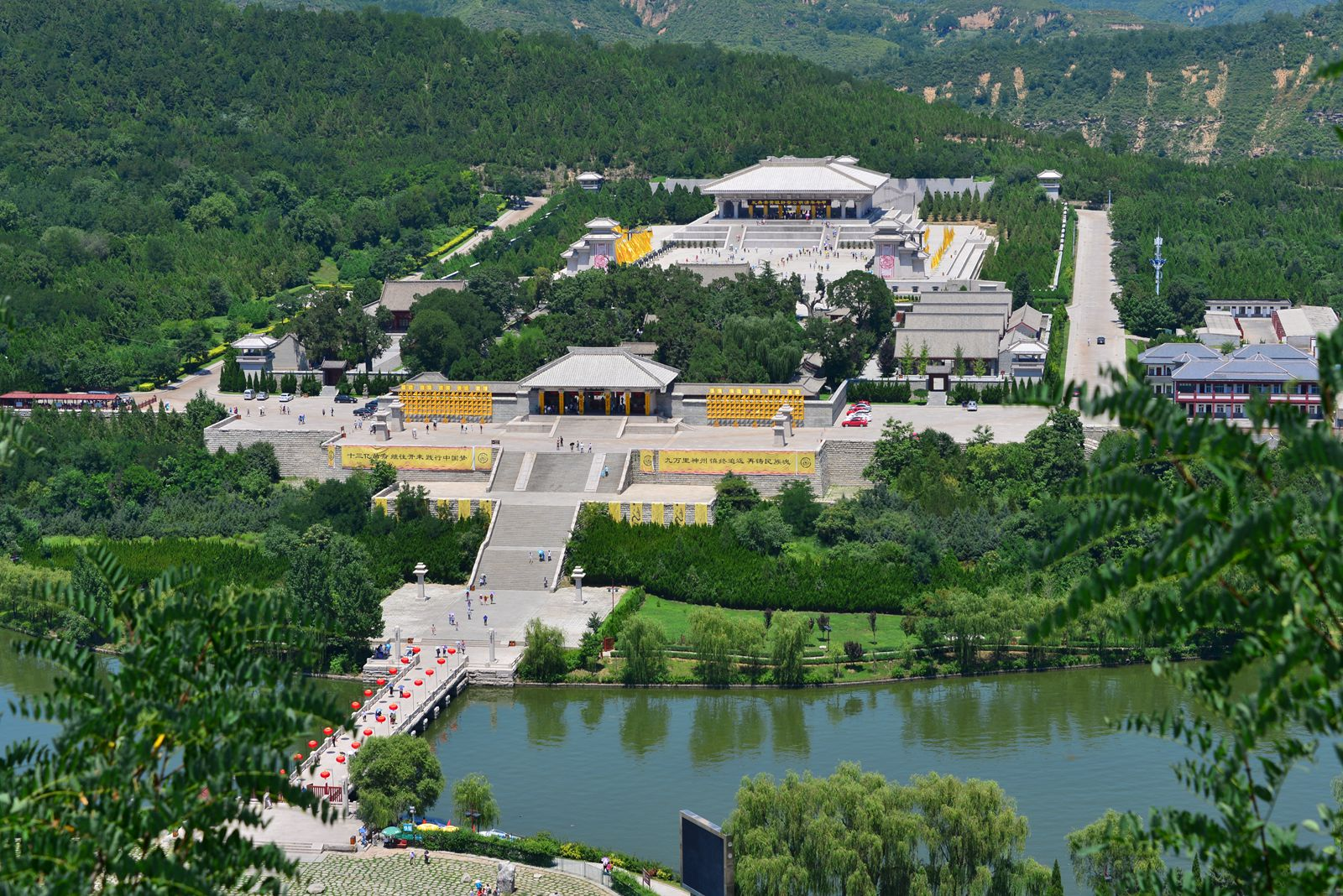
Xuanyuan Temple

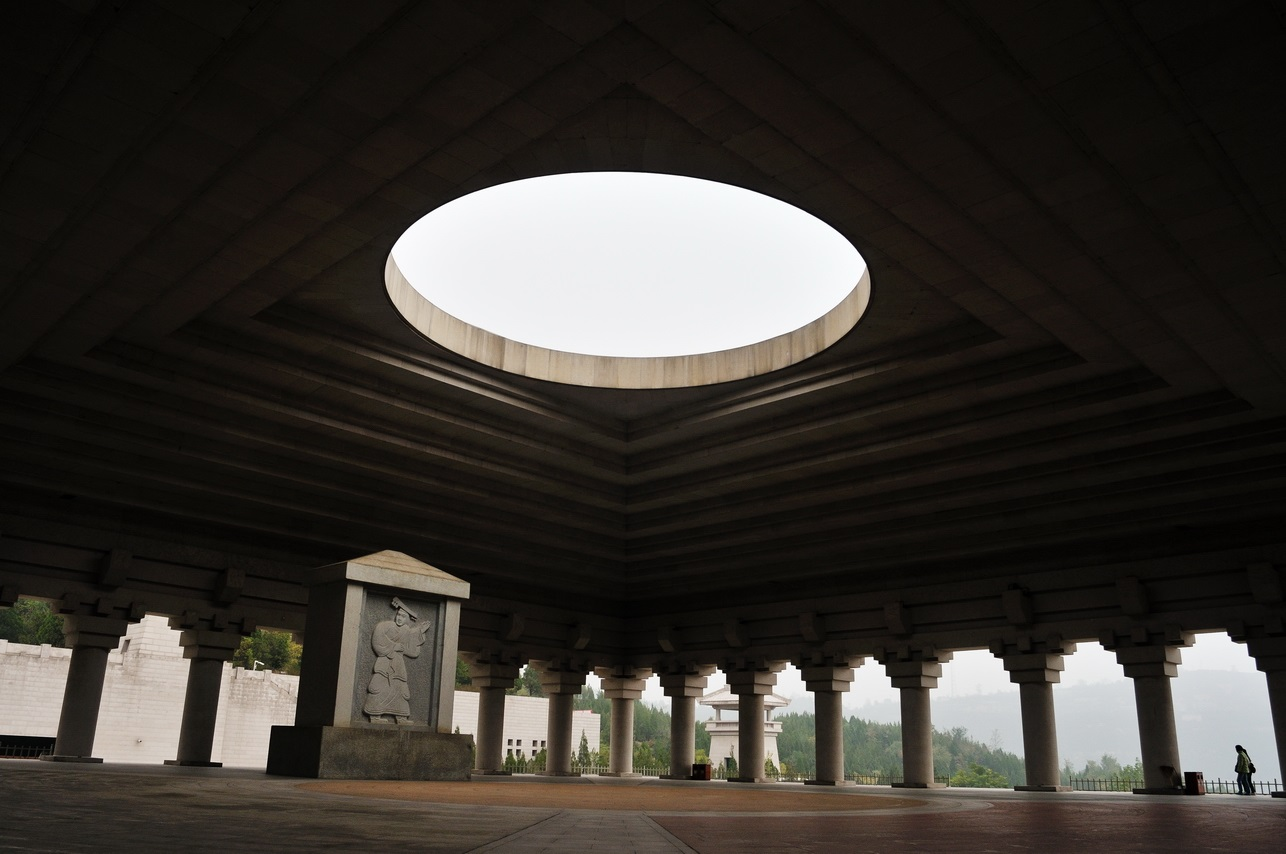
Sacrificial hall of the Xuanyuan Temple

Xuanyuan Temple (軒轅庙 Xuānyuánmiào), named after the Yellow Emperor's personal name "Xuanyuan" recorded in the Shiji, is a temple dedicated to the religion of Huangdi in Huangling, and the largest of such temples in China (there are other smaller Xuanyuanmiao throughout the country). Construction of the temple started during the post-1993 restoration works of Huangling. The shrine is approximately 8,000 square meters in size and is made entirely of granite. Its central building is called the Hall of Xuanyuan (軒轅殿 Xuānyuándiàn). Yearly sacrifices are held at the temple.

== Past offerings and restorations ==
The emperors of Chinese dynasties venerated the Yellow Emperor's mausoleum, and most would dispatch a closely trusted high-ranked official, bearing an imperial monument written by the emperor himself, to conduct the ceremonies.

- 220 BCE: Tradition states that Qin Shi Huang, after subduing the other Chinese states and proclaiming himself emperor, personally carried offerings and his sword to the Yellow Emperor's temple to seclude himself and offer prayers.
- 110 BCE: In the tenth lunar month, Emperor Wu of the Han dynasty led 180,000 troops to make offerings at the Yellow Emperor's tomb and set up the "Immortal's Altar" mentioned above.
- During the Tang dynasty, the traditional sacrifices to the Yellow Emperor were officially adopted by the state.
- 1040 to 1043: during the reign of Emperor Renzong in the Song dynasty, the minister Fan Zhongyan made ceremonial sacrifice there three times.
- 1061: Emperor Renzong of the Song dynasty decreed the mass planting of cypress trees at the complex.
- 1325: During the Yuan dynasty, the Mongol emperor Yesün Temür issued a decree protecting the tomb site.
- 1371: The Hongwu Emperor of the Ming dynasty sent imperial historian Guan Gougan to officiate an offering.
- 1651: The Shunzhi Emperor of the Qing dynasty had numerous veneration ceremonies for the Yellow Emperor conducted.
- 1911: Following the Xinhai Revolution, the Nationalist government of the Republic of China continued the tradition of making offerings at the Yellow Emperor's mausoleum. Sun Yat-sen and Chiang Kai-shek sent officials to perform the ceremonies on several occasions.
- 1939: During the Qingming Festival, Mao Zedong dispatched Lin Boqu to conduct the sacrifices and offerings.
- 2006: The ceremonial offerings to the Yellow Emperor were entered into the National Immaterial Cultural Relic List.

== See also ==
- Shou Qiu, the legendary birthplace of the Yellow Emperor (in Qufu, Shandong)
