= Yanhewan =

Yanhewan 沿河湾镇
- Town
- Location within China
- Coordinates: 36°45′08″N 109°22′04″E
- Country: China
- Province: Shaanxi
- Prefecture-level city: Yan'an
- County: Ansai District

Area
  - Total: 210.92 km^{2} (81.44 sq mi)

Population (2010)
  - Total: 14,499
  - Density: 68.742/km^{2} (178.04/sq mi)

Yanhewan (simplified Chinese: 沿河湾镇; traditional Chinese: 沿河灣鎮; pinyin: Yánhéwān Zhèn), is a town in Ansai District, Yan'an, Shaanxi, China. The town spans an area of 210.92 square kilometres (81.44 mi^{2}). According to the 2010 Chinese Census, Yanhewan has a population of 14,499.

== History ==
=== Dynastic China ===
In the early 7th century, during the Tang dynasty, the urban center of Jinming County (simplified Chinese: 金明县; traditional Chinese: 金明縣; pinyin: Jīnmíng Xiàn) was located in present-day Diezigou Village in Yanhewan.

During the Song dynasty, Ansai Fort (Chinese: 安塞堡; pinyin: Ānsāi Bǎo) was built in the ancient city of Ansai, located in present-day Yanhewan.

=== Second United Front ===
On September 12, 1937, according to an order from the Shaanxi-Gansu-Ningxia Border Region Government, Ansai County, which governed the region including Yanhewan, was re-organized into 7 districts governing 42 townships. One such district was Yanhewan, which governed six townships, including the eponymous Yanhewan township.

=== People's Republic of China ===
In March 1956, Ansai County's districts were re-organized, and Yanhewan District was abolished, replaced with the directly administered township of Yanhewan.

In September 1958, Yanhewan became a people's commune, and was renamed to Hongqi (Chinese: 红旗; lit. 'red flag'). In September 1961, Ansai County was re-established, and Yanhewan was placed under its jurisdiction. In December 1983, the people's communes were abolished, and Yanhewan was established as a town.

== Administrative divisions ==
Yanhewan administers the following 15 administrative villages:

- Yanhewan Village (Chinese: 沿河湾村)
- Majiagou Village (Chinese: 马家沟村)
- Diezigou Village (Chinese: 碟子沟村)
- Baijiagou Village (Chinese: 白家沟村)
- Lijiawan Village (Chinese: 李家湾村)
- Fangjiahe Village (Chinese: 方家河村)
- Zhaiziwan Village (Chinese: 寨子湾村)
- Yanjiawan Village (Chinese: 闫家湾村)
- Hougoumen Village (Chinese: 候沟门村)
- Yunping Village (Chinese: 云坪村)
- Chafang Village (Chinese: 茶坊村)
- Liudang Village (Chinese: 刘党村)
- Bianqiang Village (Chinese: 边墙村)
- Jiajiawa Village (Chinese: 贾家洼村)
- Gaojiamao Village (Chinese: 高家峁村)

== Demographics ==
According to the 2010 Chinese Census, Yanhewan had a population of 14,499 in 2010. This is down slightly from the 15,245 recorded in the 2000 Chinese Census.

As of 2018, Yanhewan has a hukou population of 20,236.

== Transportation ==
The G65 Baotou–Maoming Expressway passes through Yanhewan, and it forms a junction with the terminus of the Yanwu Expressway in Yanhewan.
