= Ansai District =

Ansai 安塞区
- District
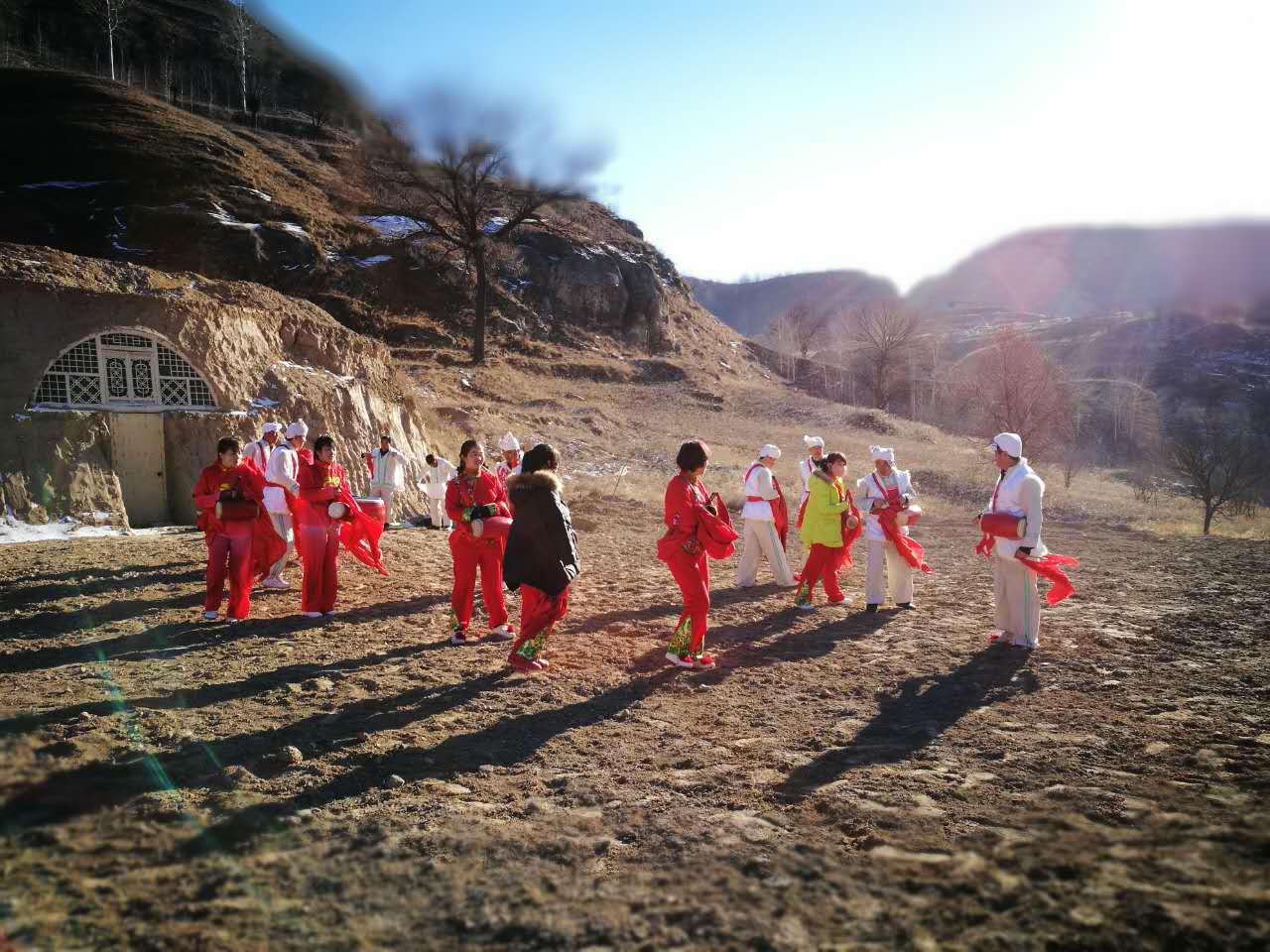

- Ansai in Yan'an

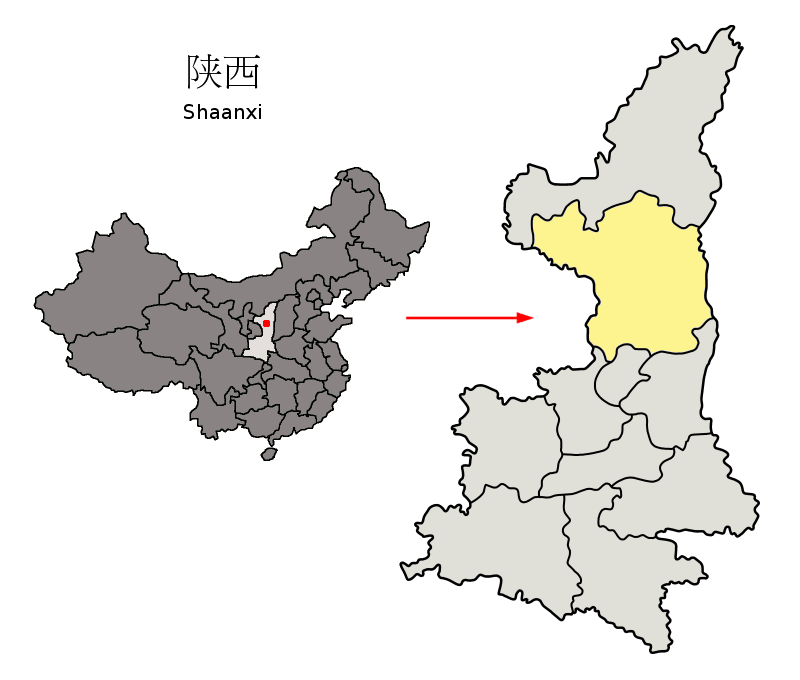
- Yan'an in Shaanxi
- Coordinates (Ansai District government): 36°51′53″N 109°19′45″E
- Country: People's Republic of China
- Province: Shaanxi
- Prefecture-level city: Yan'an
- Seat: Zhenwudong Subdistrict

Area
  - Total: 2,951.3 km^{2} (1,139.5 sq mi)
- Elevation: 1,371.9 m (4,501 ft)

Population (2012)
  - Total: 172,900
  - Density: 58.58/km^{2} (151.7/sq mi)
- Time zone: UTC+8 (China standard time)

Ansai (simplified Chinese: 安塞区; traditional Chinese: 安塞區; pinyin: Ānsāi Qū) is a district of the city of Yan'an, Shaanxi province, China. It has a total area of 2,951.3 km^{2} (1,139.5 sq mi) and a population of 172,900 people. Part of the Loess Plateau, the district has an average elevation of 1,371.9 metres (4,501 ft). Its postal code is 717400, and its Serial Number is 610624.

== Administrative divisions ==
Ansai District administers three subdistricts and eight towns.

=== Subdistricts ===
Ansai has jurisdiction over the following 3 subdistricts:

- Zhenwudong Subdistrict (Chinese: 真武洞街道; pinyin: Zhēnwǔdòng Jiēdào)
- Jinming Subdistrict (Chinese: 金明街道; pinyin: Jīnmíng Jiēdào)
- Baiping Subdistrict (Chinese: 白坪街道; pinyin: Báipíng Jiēdào)

=== Towns ===
Ansai has jurisdiction over the following 8 towns:

- Zhuanyaowan (砖窑湾镇; Zhuānyáowān Zhèn)
- Yanhewan (沿河湾镇; Yánhéwān Zhèn)
- Zhao'an (招安镇; Zhāo'ān Zhèn)
- Huaziping (化子坪镇; Huāzipíng Zhèn)
- Pingqiao (坪桥镇; Píngqiáo Zhèn)
- Jianhua (建华镇; Jiànhuá Zhèn)
- Gaoqiao (高桥镇; Gāoqiáo Zhèn)
- Liandaowan (镰刀湾镇; Liándāowān Zhèn)

== Geography ==
The district, located in the Loess Plateau, is largely hilly, with its elevation ranging from 1,012 metres (3,320 ft) to 1,731.1 metres (5,679 ft) in height. The main rivers of the district are the Yan River, the Xingzi River, the Xichuan River, the Xiaochuan River, the Xiaogou River, and the Shuangyang River.

=== Climate ===
The district has an average temperature of 8.8 °C (47.8 °F), an average annual rainfall of 505.3 millimetres (19.89 in), and experiences an average of 2,395.6 hours of sunshine per year.

Climate data for Ansai, elevation 1,068 m (3,504 ft), (1991–2020 normals, extremes 1981–2010)
Month	Jan	Feb	Mar	Apr	May	Jun	Jul	Aug	Sep	Oct	Nov	Dec	Year
Record high °C (°F)	16.4 (61.5)	24.1 (75.4)	28.8 (83.8)	35.8 (96.4)	36.5 (97.7)	38.3 (100.9)	38.1 (100.6)	34.6 (94.3)	36.6 (97.9)	28.9 (84.0)	24.8 (76.6)	16.5 (61.7)	38.3 (100.9)
Mean daily maximum °C (°F)	2.4 (36.3)	6.7 (44.1)	13.2 (55.8)	20.5 (68.9)	25.2 (77.4)	28.9 (84.0)	29.7 (85.5)	27.8 (82.0)	23.1 (73.6)	17.4 (63.3)	10.6 (51.1)	3.8 (38.8)	17.4 (63.4)
Daily mean °C (°F)	−6.3 (20.7)	−1.9 (28.6)	4.6 (40.3)	11.8 (53.2)	17.0 (62.6)	21.1 (70.0)	22.9 (73.2)	21.1 (70.0)	15.9 (60.6)	9.2 (48.6)	2.1 (35.8)	−4.6 (23.7)	9.4 (48.9)
Mean daily minimum °C (°F)	−12.2 (10.0)	−8.0 (17.6)	−2.0 (28.4)	4.2 (39.6)	9.4 (48.9)	14.0 (57.2)	17.4 (63.3)	16.3 (61.3)	11.1 (52.0)	3.8 (38.8)	−3.3 (26.1)	−10.1 (13.8)	3.4 (38.1)
Record low °C (°F)	−23.4 (−10.1)	−20.3 (−4.5)	−16.2 (2.8)	−7.1 (19.2)	−1.4 (29.5)	5.5 (41.9)	9.9 (49.8)	6.8 (44.2)	−1.0 (30.2)	−8.3 (17.1)	−18.4 (−1.1)	−25.5 (−13.9)	−25.5 (−13.9)
Average precipitation mm (inches)	4.2 (0.17)	5.6 (0.22)	11.9 (0.47)	24.2 (0.95)	44.1 (1.74)	63.2 (2.49)	119.3 (4.70)	120.9 (4.76)	74.0 (2.91)	35.6 (1.40)	14.9 (0.59)	2.8 (0.11)	520.7 (20.51)
Average precipitation days (≥ 0.1 mm)	3.2	3.3	4.5	5.6	7.6	9.6	13.2	13.1	11.6	7.8	4.3	2.0	85.8
Average snowy days	4.3	4.3	2.4	0.6	0	0	0	0	0	0.4	2.2	3.0	17.2
Average relative humidity (%)	56	53	50	46	50	58	70	75	76	72	64	58	61
Mean monthly sunshine hours	177.8	172.3	213.2	231.5	251.8	243.1	228.2	211.6	174.6	175.4	165.8	172.3	2,417.6
Percentage possible sunshine	58	56	57	58	57	55	52	51	48	51	55	58	55
Source: China Meteorological Administration

== Economy ==
Ansai is a traditionally agricultural district where vegetables, livestock, apples, apricots are produced. Key natural resources in the district include oil, natural gas, iron, limestone, gypsum, kerogen and fire clay.

== Culture ==
Ansai's cultural heritage includes typical Shanbei folk art. There is a tradition of paper-cutting, the painting of farmers, clay crafts, waist drums, and folk songs. Ansai's drum music has long been famous. A large number of folk art items are stored in the district office.

Ansai is part of the Chinese Communists base in northern Shaanxi, with several schools in the south suburb of Yan'an.

== Transport ==
The G65 Baomao Expressway, Shaanxi Highway 206, and Shaanxi Highway 303 pass through the district. The Yanwu Expressway, an expressway connecting Ansai District to nearby Wuqi County, begins in the town of Yanhewan in Ansai District.

In August 2012, a sleeper bus crashed into a tanker carrying methanol, killing 36 people and injuring 3.
