= Zhidan County =

Zhidan 志丹县 Chihtan
- County
- Zhidan in Yan'an

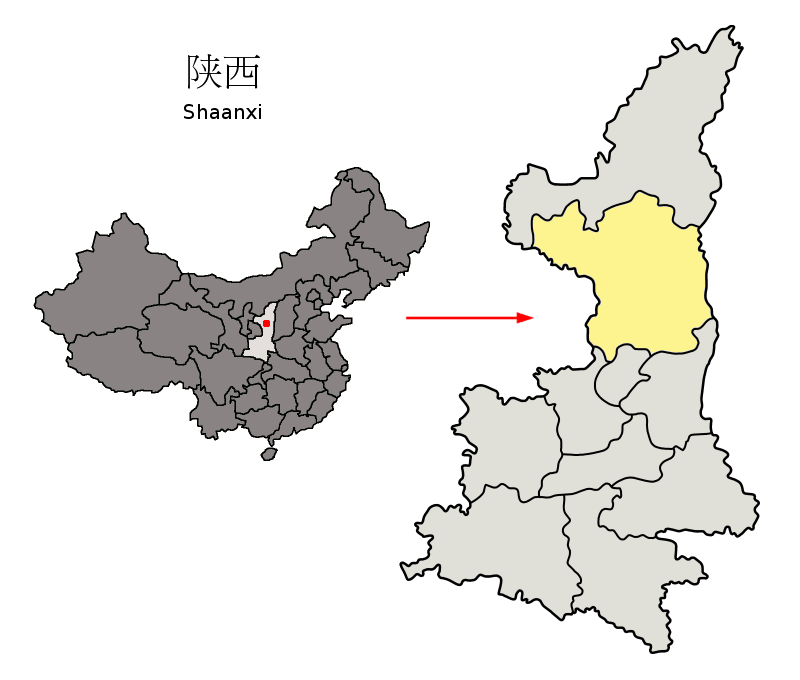
- Yan'an in Shaanxi
- Coordinates (Zhidan County government): 36°49′20″N 108°46′06″E
- Country: People's Republic of China
- Province: Shaanxi
- Prefecture-level city: Yan'an

Area
  - Total: 3,790.2 km^{2} (1,463.4 sq mi)

Population (2012)
  - Total: 141,600
  - Density: 37.36/km^{2} (96.76/sq mi)
- Time zone: UTC+8 (China Standard)
- Postal code: 717500
- Website: www.zhidan.gov.cn

Zhidan (simplified Chinese: 志丹县; traditional Chinese: 志丹縣; pinyin: Zhìdān Xiàn) is a county under the administration of the prefecture-level city of Yan'an, in the northwest of Shaanxi Province, China, bordering Gansu Province to the south. The county has an area of 3,790.2 square kilometres (1,463.4 mi^{2}), and a population of 141,600 as of 2012. Zhidan County and surrounding areas host oil drilling and industry.

== Administrative divisions ==
Zhidan County is divided into 1 subdistrict and 7 towns.

=== Bao'an Subdistrict ===
The county's sole subdistrict is Bao'an Subdistrict, which hosts the county's government.

=== Towns ===
Zhidan County is home to the following 7 towns:

- Danba
- Jinding
- Yongning
- Xinghe
- Shunning
- Yizheng
- Shuanghe

== Geography ==
Zhidan County is located in the hilly Loess Plateau, and is approximately 90 kilometres (56 mi) northwest of Yan'an city proper.

=== Climate ===
The county's average annual temperature is 7.8 °C (46.0 °F), and its average annual precipitation is 524.5 millimetres (20.65 in).

Climate data for Zhidan, elevation 1,297 m (4,255 ft), (1991–2020 normals, extremes 1981–2010)
Month	Jan	Feb	Mar	Apr	May	Jun	Jul	Aug	Sep	Oct	Nov	Dec	Year
Record high °C (°F)	16.4 (61.5)	22.6 (72.7)	28.7 (83.7)	35.1 (95.2)	35.8 (96.4)	37.3 (99.1)	37.1 (98.8)	34.3 (93.7)	34.6 (94.3)	29.2 (84.6)	24.5 (76.1)	17.3 (63.1)	37.3 (99.1)
Mean daily maximum °C (°F)	2.6 (36.7)	6.5 (43.7)	12.6 (54.7)	19.6 (67.3)	24.2 (75.6)	28.1 (82.6)	29.1 (84.4)	27.3 (81.1)	22.4 (72.3)	16.9 (62.4)	10.4 (50.7)	4.1 (39.4)	17.0 (62.6)
Daily mean °C (°F)	−6.7 (19.9)	−2.4 (27.7)	4.0 (39.2)	10.9 (51.6)	16.1 (61.0)	20.3 (68.5)	22.1 (71.8)	20.5 (68.9)	15.3 (59.5)	8.6 (47.5)	1.5 (34.7)	−5.1 (22.8)	8.8 (47.8)
Mean daily minimum °C (°F)	−13.2 (8.2)	−8.8 (16.2)	−2.7 (27.1)	3.1 (37.6)	8.3 (46.9)	13.1 (55.6)	16.5 (61.7)	15.5 (59.9)	10.4 (50.7)	3.0 (37.4)	−4.3 (24.3)	−11.2 (11.8)	2.5 (36.4)
Record low °C (°F)	−25.9 (−14.6)	−21.5 (−6.7)	−17.9 (−0.2)	−7.9 (17.8)	−2.8 (27.0)	2.7 (36.9)	8.4 (47.1)	5.5 (41.9)	−3.2 (26.2)	−10.6 (12.9)	−18.0 (−0.4)	−28.7 (−19.7)	−28.7 (−19.7)
Average precipitation mm (inches)	4.0 (0.16)	5.9 (0.23)	11.5 (0.45)	24.8 (0.98)	39.6 (1.56)	62.1 (2.44)	113.7 (4.48)	121.2 (4.77)	69.7 (2.74)	35.1 (1.38)	13.3 (0.52)	3.0 (0.12)	503.9 (19.83)
Average precipitation days (≥ 0.1 mm)	3.1	3.4	4.7	5.5	7.8	10.2	13.2	12.9	10.9	7.8	4.3	1.9	85.7
Average snowy days	3.9	4.1	3.0	0.6	0	0	0	0	0	0.5	2.4	2.9	17.4
Average relative humidity (%)	57	54	51	48	52	60	70	75	76	72	65	59	62
Mean monthly sunshine hours	188.4	175.4	213.4	227.8	245.1	232.7	216.1	196.2	166.6	175.9	175.3	186.5	2,399.4
Percentage possible sunshine	61	57	57	57	56	53	49	47	45	51	58	63	55
Source: China Meteorological Administration

== History ==
The area now known as Zhidan County was formerly known as the town of Bao'an (Chinese: 保安; pinyin: Bǎo'ān; Wade–Giles: Pao An, Postal Romanization: Paoan) (corresponding to the urban core of today's Zhidan County). The town of Bao'an appears in many contemporaneous works and articles discussing the Chinese Civil War. The historical significance of the town of Bao'an arises due to its having temporarily served as the capital of the Communist-held regions of China in the midst of the Chinese Civil War. From early July 1936 to January 1937 Bao'an was the site of the Central Committee of the Chinese Communist Party headquarters, as well as that of the People's Liberation Army.

Journalist Edgar Snow visited the communist leaders in Bao'an in the summer and fall of 1936, and named the third part of his book Red Star Over China after this town. He described the town as follows:

Pao An was once a frontier stronghold... Remains of its fortifications, flame-struck in that afternoon sun, could be seen flanking the narrow pass through which once emptied into this valley the conquering legions of the Mongols. There was an inner city, still, where the garrisons were once quartered; and a high defensive masonry, lately improved by the Reds, embraced about a square mile in which the present town was located.

In 1937, Yan'an (Wade–Giles: Yenan) replaced Bao'an as the capital of Communist-held China.

The modern name of the county, Zhidan, takes its name from Liu Zhidan, military strategist and high-ranking leader of the Chinese Workers' and Peasants' Red Army who died while leading the Eastern Expedition in April 1936.

== Economy ==
Zhidan County has a number of mineral deposits, such as petroleum, coal, natural gas, dolomite, oil shale, and mineral water.
