= Northern Shaanxi =

Northern portion of Shaanxi

Coordinates: 37.4°N 109.6°E

- Simplified Chinese: 陕北
- Traditional Chinese: 陝北
Transcriptions
Standard Mandarin
- Hanyu Pinyin: Shǎnběi
- Wade–Giles: Shan3-pei3

Northern Shaanxi or Shaanbei (陕北) is the northern portion of China's Shaanxi province. More specifically, it refers to the region north of the Huanglong Mountain and the Meridian Ridge (the so-called "Guanzhong north mountains") within the province. Being both a geographic area as well as a cultural area, it makes up the southeastern portion of the Ordos Basin and forms the northern part of the Loess Plateau. The region includes two prefecture-level cities: Yulin, which is known for the Ming Great Wall traversing through its northern part; and Yan'an, which is known for being the birthplace of the Chinese Communist Revolution.

== Geography ==
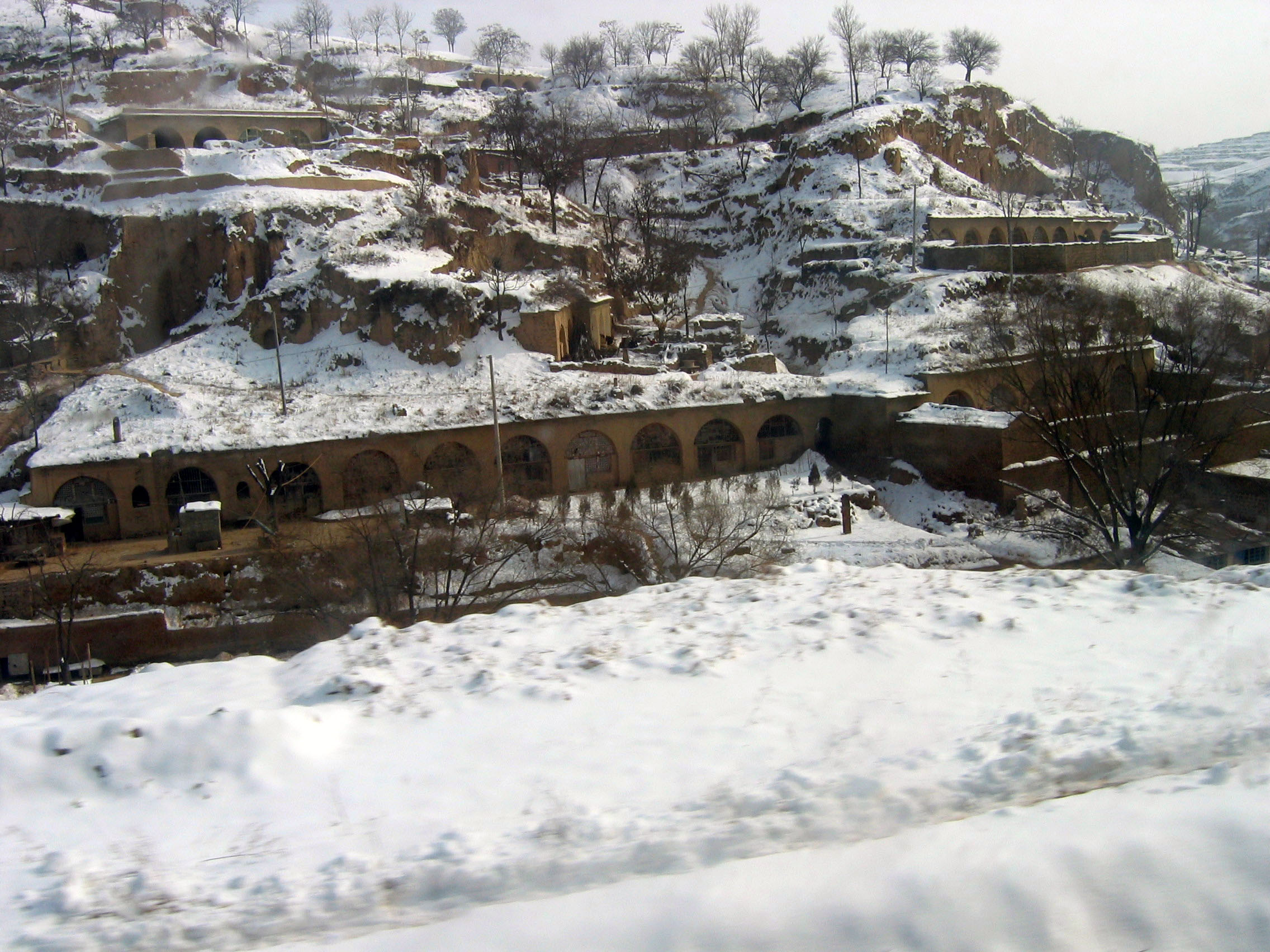
A view of yaodongs, a traditional cave house common to the Loess Plateau, in Qingjian County

Shaanbei, referring to the northern portion of Shaanxi, includes the prefecture-level cities of Yulin and Yan'an. The region's physical geography is largely characterized by the presence of the Loess Plateau. Shaanbei is located in the northern edge of the Loess Plateau with a general elevation range of 800–1,300 metres (2,600–4,300 ft), occupying approximately 45% of the total area of Shaanxi. Elevation tends to increase from northwest to southeast. The northern portions degrade into the Ordos Desert, while the southern portions slope up into hills. The Guanzhong region, also in Shaanxi, is located to the south of Shaanbei.

== Culture ==
Shaanbei culture includes a number of distinct art forms, such as its Northern Shaanxi folk singing, waist-drums, paper-cutting, and a distinct form of painting known as "farmer painting". Other forms of Chinese art are also present in Shaanbei, including traditional Chinese theater, shadow puppetry, yangge dance troupes, and traditional storytellers. Historically, cultural activities in Shaanbei have been organized both by professional troupes and amateur groups, and typically performed for all audiences, regardless of status.

The predominant language of Shaanbei is Jin Chinese, with the southern areas being a transition zone into Guanzhong dialect.

=== Historical development ===
During the time of the Shaan-Gan-Ning Border Region, a number of prominent intellectuals within China moved to the Shaanbei region to flee from the Japanese invasion of China. There, the Communist Party encouraged them to embed themselves in the rural culture of the region, in an effort to bolster support for its efforts. Renowned folk artists throughout China were also invited to its regional capital of Yan'an, and other parts of the Border Region, to allow for interaction between the artists and the urban intellectuals who fled to the region. The Communist Party had a mixed perspective on folk art in the region at the time, as it served as a cultural expression for the region's rural peasantry, but did so through a pre-modern Confucian lens, and was often reliant on the patronage of wealthy landlords. By the early 1940s, some folk artists had taken steps to make certain folk arts more accessible to the public, an example being the traditional yangge dance. By the mid-1940s, some traditional performing arts began to incorporate explicit pro-Communist political messaging.

=== Performance arts ===
==== Shaanbei folk singing ====
Shaanbei's style of folk-singing is distinct from other types of folk singing throughout China, and has gained fame via a number of media depictions, such as in the 1984 film Yellow Earth. The songs are typically about the struggles of rural life, such as poverty and arranged marriages. Many of these folks songs are hundreds of years old, and passed down from generation to generation.

==== Waist drums ====
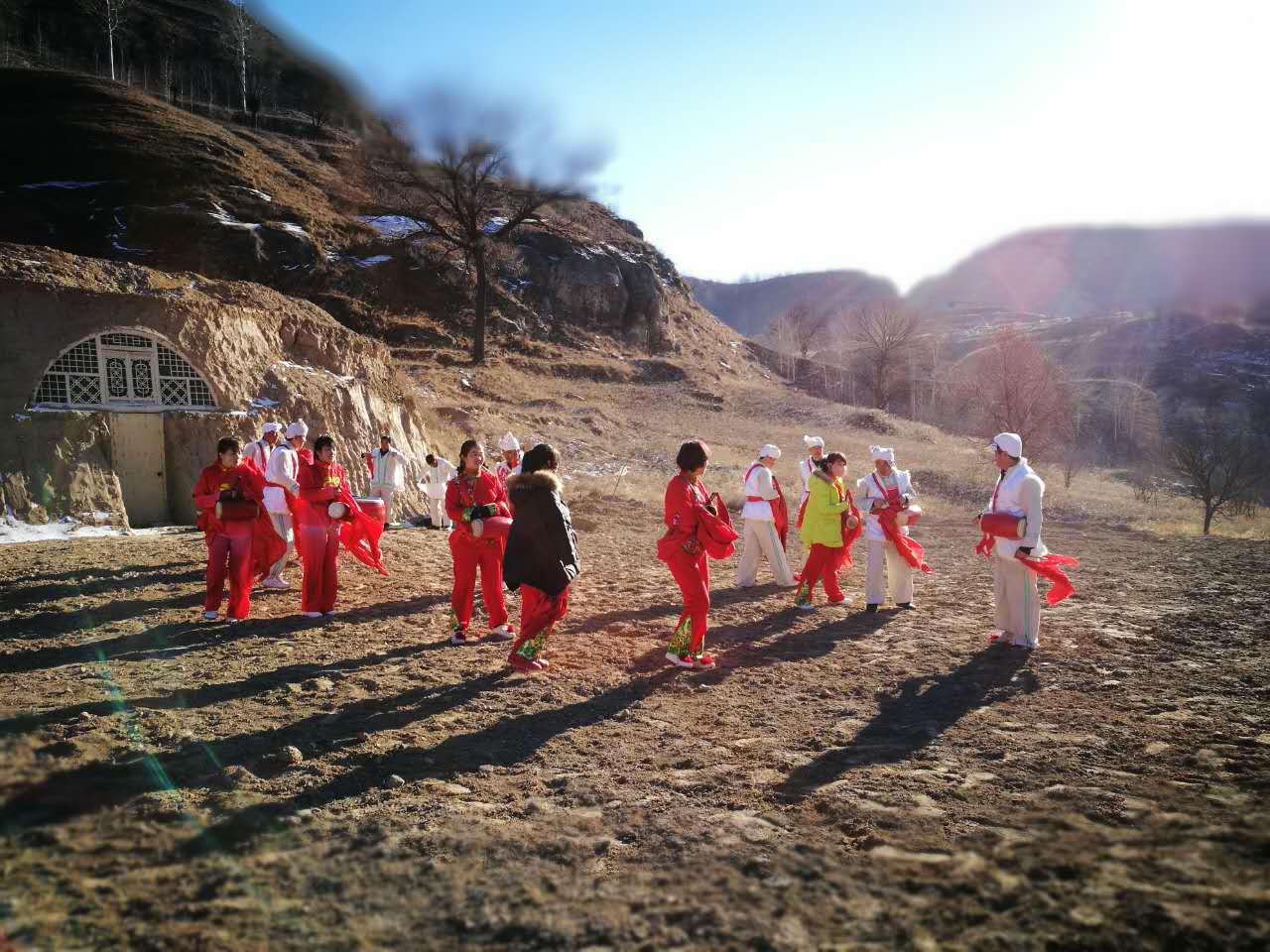
Traditional waist drum dancers from Ansai District

Certain celebrations in Shaanbei are accompanied by dancers hoisting Ansai waist-drums called yaogu (腰鼓), small drums strapped to the front of the dancers' waist. This tradition gained national notoriety through the film Yellow Earth, which included a scene featuring over 150 real drummers from the region.

==== Opera ====
Qinqiang opera, native to Shaanxi, is popular in the region. Although Qinqiang opera was historically performed predominantly by professional troupes, some semi-professional troupes are still present. Shanxi opera is also popular throughout the region, due to its proximity to neighboring Shanxi (not to be confused with the similar sounding Shaanxi, the province in which Shaanbei is located in).

==== Daoqing shadow puppetry ====
Daoqing is a local form of shadow puppetry indigenous to Shaanbei. It emerged in the region during the 19th century, and has historically been performed by small, amateur and unorganized troupes. However, there have been records of professional daoqing troupes as early as the late 1930s, and activists began to form formal organizations for daoqing troupes by the 1940s.

==== Yangge dances ====
Yangge, a traditional costumed dance occasionally accompanied by music and short sketches, has traditionally been used in Shaanxi as a post-Lunar New Year celebration. Yangge varies widely from place to place within Shaanxi.

=== Visual arts ===
==== Paper cutting ====
Paper cutting is another art-form traditional to the Shaanbei region, serving a number of different purposes. In addition to beautifying the environment during important festivals, paper cut art also serves as a symbol of love and fertility during marriage, can be used to pay respects to various religious figures, incorporated into embroidery, or simply serve as toys.

==== Farmer painting ====
Shaanbei farmer painting is a tradition hundreds of years old, dating back to dynastic promotion of painting. These types of paintings often feature bright colors and depictions of animals. Key characteristics of farmer painting is that it commonly takes on subjects specific to the local region, its emphasis on expression rather than adhering to specific rules, use of thick outlines of shapes, use of artist's conception, heavy usage of symbolism, and bright colors.

=== Religion ===
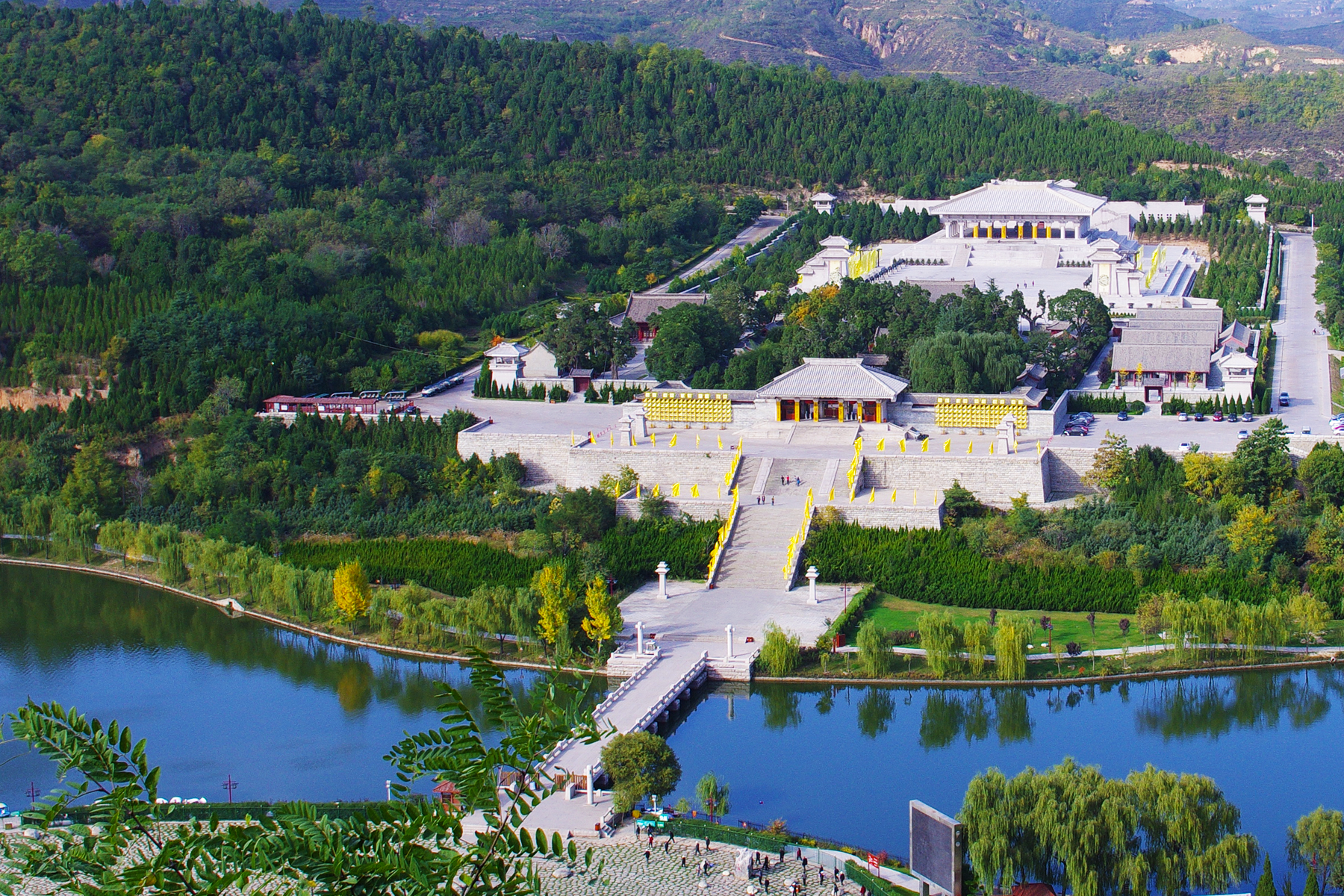
Xuanyuan Temple at the Mausoleum of the Yellow Emperor, in Huangling County

Traditional religion in Shaanbei underwent a major decline throughout the 20th century. Some within the May Fourth Movement during the early years of the Republic of China vandalized temples, converted temples to schools, and condemned traditional shamans. During the Warlord Era of the 1910s and 1920s, some local warlords would destroy temples, or convert them into barracks for their soldiers. Subsequently, traditional religions continued to face suppression when the Kuomintang established firmer control of the area during the 1930s. Local conflict between the Kuomintang and the Communist Party resulted in unsafe conditions for religious pilgrimages in the area, and resulted in more damage and destruction to local temples. Under the Communist Party's Shaan-Gan-Ning Border Region, Communist Party forces made a concentrated effort to neuter local shamans and mediums, which it denounced as backward and feudal. Organized religion saw a revival during the 1950s, when firm Communist Party control led to peace and economic recovery. While traditional religious leaders had much of their property redistributed during this time, ordinary peasants were on the receiving end of this, and used a significant amount of the resources to further inclusionary religious activities, and reconstruct previously damaged and destroyed religious sites. Religious activity would face a period of mild repression beginning in the mid-1960s, and then a heightened period of suppression during the Cultural Revolution. Organized religion began to emerge from the shadows by the end of the 1970s, and underwent a revival during the 1980s and 1990s. By the 21st century, government institutions to support certain religious organizations had emerged, although said organizations must provide a certain level of political and financial support to the government.

While there is a great deal of variety among Chinese folk religions within Shaanbei, the presence of deities is generally accepted among folk religion adherents, as are the beliefs that such deities should be venerated, that individuals can ask them for help, and that they can aid people.

Major religious sites in Shaanbei include the Baiyunshan Temples, Taihe Mountain (Chinese: 太和山) in Yan'an, and Helong Mountain (Chinese: 合龙山) in Suide County.

Popular traditional deities among local adherents to Chinese folk religion include Zhenwu Zushi (Chinese: 真武祖师) and Guan Yu.

Major festivals in Shaanbei include the Lunar New Year, and during the birthdays of various locally-venerated deities. Such festivals are typically organized by local temple associations.

== See also ==
- Shaannan, which refers to the southern part of the province.
- Heilongdawang Temple, a temple located in Northern Shaanxi.
