= Fu Prefecture (Shaanxi) =

Historical administrative division in Shaanxi, China

Fuzhou or Fu Prefecture (鄜州) was a zhou (prefecture) in imperial China, centering on modern Fu County, Shaanxi, China. It existed (intermittently) from 554 until 1913.

== Geography ==
The administrative region of Fuzhou in the Tang dynasty is in modern Yan'an in Shaanxi. It probably includes parts of modern:

- Fu County
- Ganquan County
- Luochuan County
