= Fengqi Subdistrict =

Fengqi Subdistrict 凤栖街道
- Subdistrict
- Interactive map of Fengqi Subdistrict
- Country: China
- Province: Shaanxi
- Prefecture-level city: Yan'an
- County: Luochuan County

Population (2010)
  - Total: 55,096

Fengqi Subdistrict (simplified Chinese: 凤栖街道; traditional Chinese: 鳳棲街道; pinyin: Fèngqī Jiēdào) is a subdistrict in Luochuan County, Yan'an, Shaanxi, China. According to the 2010 Chinese Census, Fengqi had a population of 55,096 in 2010.

== History ==
Present-day Fengqi Subdistrict was once known as Chengguan (Chinese: 城关; pinyin: Chéngguān), which was created as a people's commune in 1958.

Chengguan was changed to a town in 1964. The town was renamed to Fengqi (Chinese: 凤栖; pinyin: Fèngqī) in 1984.

The subdistrict was established in 2015 when the former town of Fengqi was upgraded to a subdistrict.

== Administrative divisions ==
As of 2020, Fengqi Subdistrict administers 6 residential communities and 20 administrative villages.

=== Residential communities ===
The subdistrict's 6 residential communities are as follows:

- Nanguan Community (Chinese: 南关社区)
- Jiefang Road Community (Chinese: 解放路社区)
- Dongguan Community (Chinese: 东关社区)
- Beiguan Community (Chinese: 北关社区)
- Zhongxin Street Community (Chinese: 中心街社区)
- South Street Community (Chinese: 南街社区)

=== Administrative villages ===
The subdistrict's 20 administrative villages are as follows:

- Dongguan Village (Chinese: 东关村)
- East Street Village (Chinese: 东街村)
- North Street Village (Chinese: 北街村)
- West Street Village (Chinese: 西街村)
- Xiguan Village (Chinese: 西关村)
- Houzitou Village (Chinese: 后子头村)
- Hu Village (Chinese: 胡村)
- Xibeixing Village (Chinese: 西贝兴村)
- Luo Village (Chinese: 罗村)
- Chewang Village (Chinese: 车王村)
- Heimu Village (Chinese: 黑木村)
- Zuoshan Village (Chinese: 作善村)
- Guju Village (Chinese: 谷咀村)
- Qiaoxi Village (Chinese: 桥西村)
- Lubai Village (Chinese: 芦白村)
- Anmin Village (Chinese: 安民村)
- Haoyin Village (Chinese: 好音村)
- Jiang Village (Chinese: 蒋村)
- Fengyuan Village (Chinese: 凤园村)
- Luohe Village (Chinese: 洛河村)

== Demographics ==
The 2010 Chinese Census recorded Fengqi as having a population of 55,096, up from the population of 21,060 recorded in the 2000 Chinese Census. Fengqi had an estimated population of 19,000 in 1996.

== Transportation ==
The subdistrict is served by the G65 Baotou-Maoming Expressway, National Highway 210, and Shaanxi Provincial Highway 304.
