= Yanchang County =

Yanchang 延长县 Yenchang
- County
- Yanchang in Yan'an

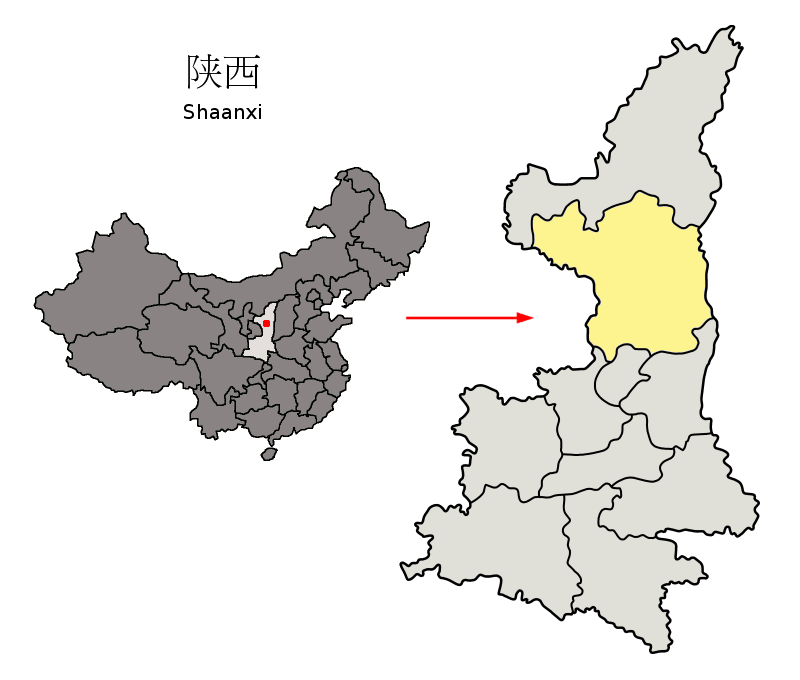
- Yan'an in Shaanxi
- Coordinates (Yanchang County government): 36°34′45″N 110°00′44″E
- Country: People's Republic of China
- Province: Shaanxi
- Prefecture-level city: Yan'an

Area
  - Total: 2,368.7 km^{2} (914.6 sq mi)

Population (2018)
  - Total: 158,000
  - Density: 66.7/km^{2} (173/sq mi)
- Time zone: UTC+8 (China Standard)
- Postal code: 717100

Yanchang County (simplified Chinese: 延长县; traditional Chinese: 延長縣; pinyin: Yáncháng Xiàn) is a county under the administration of the prefecture-level city of Yan'an, in the northeast of Shaanxi Province, bordering Shanxi Province across the Yellow River to the east. It has a land area of 2,368.7 square kilometres (914.6 mi^{2}), and a population of 158,000.

== Administrative divisions ==
Yanchang County consists of one subdistrict and seven towns. These are then further divided into 159 administrative villages.

=== Qilicun Subdistrict ===
Qilucun Subdistrict (七里村街道; Qīlǐcūn Jiēdào) is the county's sole subdistrict. Qilicun Subdistrict host's the county's administrative offices.

=== Towns ===
Yanchang County contains the following seven towns:

- Heijiabao (黑家堡镇; Hēijiābǎo Zhèn)
- Zhengzhuang (郑庄镇; Zhèngzhuāng Zhèn)
- Zhangjiatan (张家滩镇; Zhāngjiātān Zhèn)
- Jiaokou (交口镇; Jiāokǒu Zhèn)
- Luozishan (罗子山镇; Luōzishān Zhèn)
- Leichi (雷赤镇; Léichì Zhèn)
- Angou (安沟镇; Āngōu Zhèn)

== Geography ==
Located on the Loess Plateau, the county's terrain is largely hilly, with a low point of 470.6 metres (1,544 ft) above sea level, and a high point of 1,383 metres (4,537 ft) above sea level. The Yellow River passes through the county, as does the Yan River. The county has a forest coverage of 23%.

=== Climate ===
Yanchang County experiences distinctive seasons in regards to both temperature and precipitation. The county has warm and wet summers, and cold and dry winters. The county has an average annual temperature of 10.4 °C (50.7 °F), an average of 2504.6 hours of sunshine per year, and an average of 564 millimetres (22.2 in) of precipitation per year.

Climate data for Yanchang, elevation 805 m (2,641 ft), (1991−2020 normals, extremes 1981–2010)
Month	Jan	Feb	Mar	Apr	May	Jun	Jul	Aug	Sep	Oct	Nov	Dec	Year
Record high °C (°F)	15.4 (59.7)	22.4 (72.3)	29.6 (85.3)	37.9 (100.2)	37.5 (99.5)	41.1 (106.0)	40.0 (104.0)	37.3 (99.1)	38.5 (101.3)	32.1 (89.8)	24.2 (75.6)	18.3 (64.9)	41.1 (106.0)
Mean daily maximum °C (°F)	3.0 (37.4)	7.8 (46.0)	14.6 (58.3)	22.0 (71.6)	26.9 (80.4)	30.6 (87.1)	31.5 (88.7)	29.3 (84.7)	24.4 (75.9)	18.5 (65.3)	11.3 (52.3)	4.5 (40.1)	18.7 (65.6)
Daily mean °C (°F)	−5.6 (21.9)	−1.0 (30.2)	5.8 (42.4)	13.1 (55.6)	18.2 (64.8)	22.4 (72.3)	24.2 (75.6)	22.4 (72.3)	17.0 (62.6)	10.2 (50.4)	2.9 (37.2)	−3.9 (25.0)	10.5 (50.9)
Mean daily minimum °C (°F)	−11.3 (11.7)	−7.0 (19.4)	−0.9 (30.4)	5.4 (41.7)	10.4 (50.7)	15.2 (59.4)	18.5 (65.3)	17.5 (63.5)	12.2 (54.0)	5.0 (41.0)	−2.3 (27.9)	−9.2 (15.4)	4.5 (40.0)
Record low °C (°F)	−22.3 (−8.1)	−19.2 (−2.6)	−15.0 (5.0)	−7.0 (19.4)	−0.3 (31.5)	5.9 (42.6)	10.3 (50.5)	8.4 (47.1)	0.2 (32.4)	−7.9 (17.8)	−16.8 (1.8)	−23.0 (−9.4)	−23.0 (−9.4)
Average precipitation mm (inches)	3.6 (0.14)	6.0 (0.24)	12.8 (0.50)	24.8 (0.98)	39.0 (1.54)	61.4 (2.42)	113.6 (4.47)	107.1 (4.22)	69.3 (2.73)	40.6 (1.60)	15.9 (0.63)	2.5 (0.10)	496.6 (19.57)
Average precipitation days (≥ 0.1 mm)	2.6	2.8	4.0	6.0	7.7	9.3	11.8	11.0	9.8	8.1	4.2	1.5	78.8
Average snowy days	3.8	3.4	1.5	0.3	0	0	0	0	0	0	1.8	2.6	13.4
Average relative humidity (%)	57	54	53	48	53	59	69	75	76	73	65	60	62
Mean monthly sunshine hours	192.4	183.7	212.5	234.6	255.5	233.1	223.1	209.0	172.6	178.5	179.4	188.3	2,462.7
Percentage possible sunshine	62	60	57	59	58	53	50	50	47	52	59	63	56
Source: China Meteorological Administration

== History ==
Human activity in Yanchang County can be traced back thousands of years, and the first administrative district in the area arose in 266 AD.

=== Qingjian Uprising and Communist insurgency ===
Communist activity in the area began in January 1927, when a Communist Party branch was set up at a high school in the county. On October 14, 1927, party leaders Tang Shu and Xie Zichang lead an uprising called the Qingjian Uprising, which had failed. However, Communist Party activity in the region continued in subsequent years. In the spring of 1932, a communist uprising in the area occurred yet again, and the Communist Party organized militias afterwards. On May 30, 1935, Communist troops successfully took control of the county. Communist forces would retain control of the county during the rest of the Civil War, as well as during the Japanese Invasion of China.

== Economy ==
As of 2018, the county's GDP was 5.408 billion Yuan, an increase of 8.7% from the previous year. Urban residents had an average disposable income of 34,170 Yuan, and rural residents had an average disposable income of 11,105 Yuan.

=== Agriculture ===
The county's main agricultural products are apples, pears, and watermelons.

=== Mineral Resources ===
The county has vast deposits, mainly of petroleum, coal, natural gas, and salt.

==== Oil ====
The county is home to China's first oil well, which was constructed on June 5, 1907. During Mao Zedong's rule, oil production in the county was encouraged.

===== Wangjiachuan Petroleum Drilling Company =====
In 1985, the county established its own oil company, called Wangjiachuan Petroleum Drilling Company. The company was run by the county government, the first oil company in China to be structured as such. The company dug its first well on May 29, 1985, and produced 1,005 tons of crude oil by the end of the year. By the late 1990s, the company's output hovered at around 14,000 tons per year. In 2000, the county government launched reforms meant to boost its productivity, and in 2005 the company had merged into the Yanchang Oilfield Company Ltd.

===== Present-Day Situation =====
After merging into Yanchang Oilfield, the county's oil production further expanded, achieving a stable annual output of approximately 250,000 tons from 2005 through 2010. The county now has three oil production plants, which combine for an annual output in excess of 600,000 tons.

==== Coal ====
The county has coal reserves of 20.92 million tons.

==== Natural Gas ====
The county's natural gas reserves total 2,000 square kilometres (770 mi^{2}) in area, and 100 billion cubic meters in volume.

==== Salt ====
The county's salt reserves total 4.838 billion tons.

== Culture ==
Like other regions of Shaanbei, the county has a rich tradition of paper cutting. Major tourist sites include historic and archaeological sites, red tourism sites, as well as various natural sites, particularly mountains.

== Transportation ==
The county is served by a number of highways, such as Shaanxi Provincial Highway 201 and Shaanxi Provincial Highway 205.
