= Yongxiang, Luochuan County =

Yongxiang 永乡镇
- Town
- Location within China
- Coordinates: 35°49′09″N 109°29′34″E
- Country: China
- Province: Shaanxi
- Prefecture-level city: Yan'an
- County: Luochuan County

Area
  - Total: 171.28 km^{2} (66.13 sq mi)

Population (2018)
  - Total: 23,754
  - Density: 138.69/km^{2} (359.19/sq mi)

Yongxiang (simplified Chinese: 永乡镇; traditional Chinese: 永鄉鎮; pinyin: Yǒngxiāng Zhèn) is a town in Luochuan County, Yan'an, Shaanxi, China. The town is located 10 kilometres (6.2 mi) to the northwest of the county's urban center. Yongxiang spans an area of 171.28 square kilometres (66.13 mi^{2}), and has a hukou population of 23,754 as of 2018.

== History ==
In August 1937, the Luochuan Conference was held in Fengjia Village (simplified Chinese: 冯家村; traditional Chinese: 馮家村; pinyin: Féngjiā Cūn), which is located in present-day Yongxiang.

In 1961, the Yongxiang People's Commune (simplified Chinese: 永乡公社; traditional Chinese: 永鄉公社; pinyin: Yǒngxiāng Gōngshè) was established. In 1984, Yongxiang was changed from a people's commune to a township.

The town of Yongxiang was formed in 2015 as a merger between Yong Township and Huangzhang Township.

== Administrative divisions ==
Yongxiang administers 26 administrative villages.

== Demographics ==
As of 2018, Yongxiang has a hukou population of 23,754.

In the 2010 Chinese census, the two townships that now comprise Yongxiang, Yong Township and Huangzhang Township, had a population of 12,293 and 9,286, respectively. Previously, in the 2000 Chinese census, these townships had populations of 13,257 and 8,524, respectively.

== Transport ==
National Highway 210 passes through the town.
