= Luochuan County =

Luochuan 洛川县 Lochwan
- County
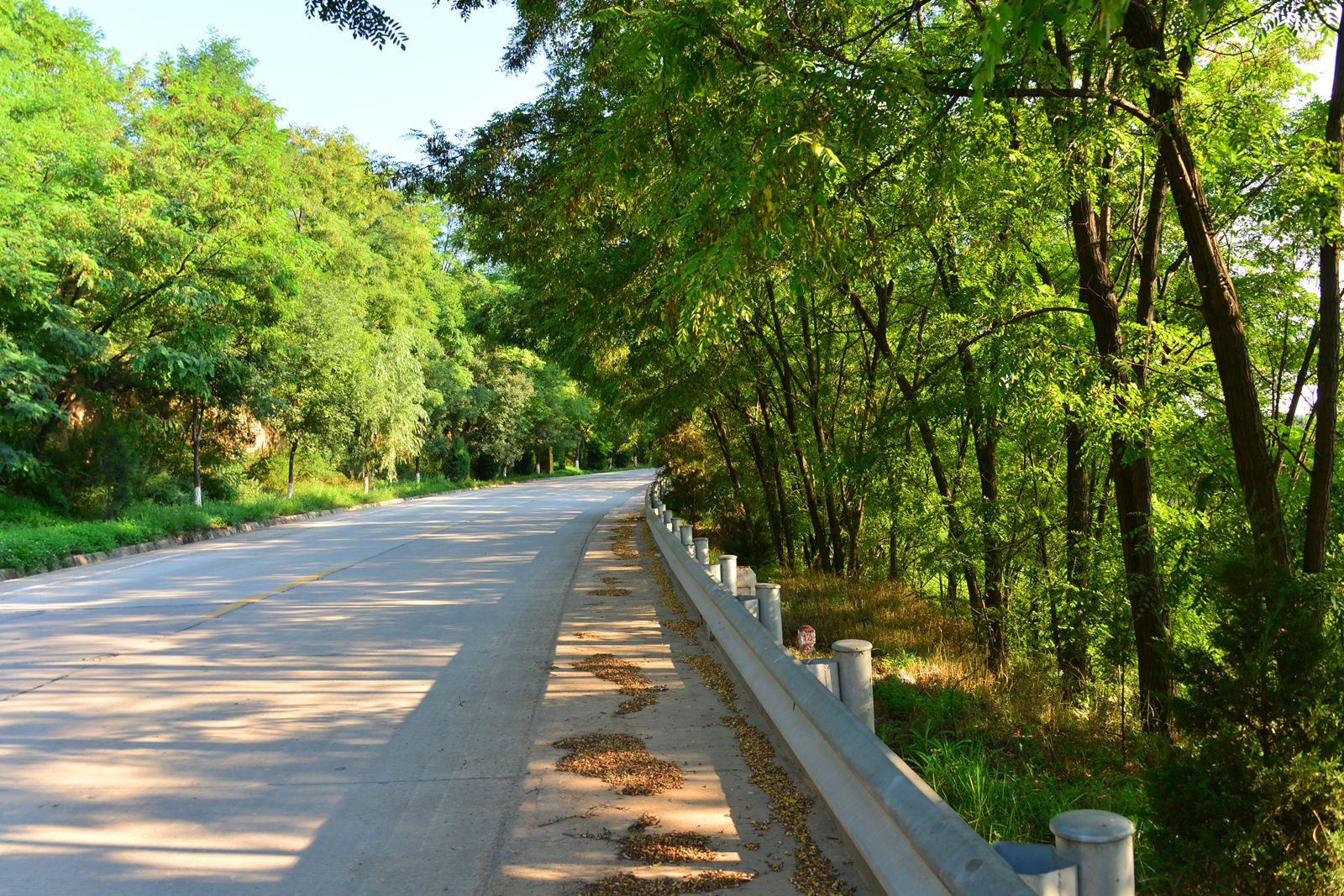
- China National Highway 210 in Luochuan

- Location in Yan'an

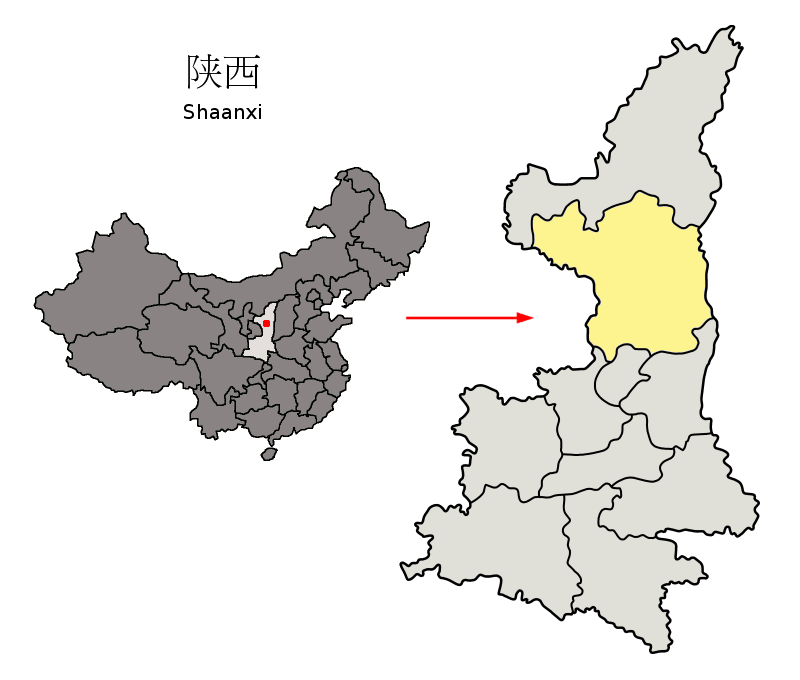
- Yan'an in Shaanxi
- Coordinates (Luochuan County government): 35°45′45″N 109°25′57″E
- Country: People's Republic of China
- Province: Shaanxi
- Prefecture-level city: Yan'an

Area
  - Total: 1,791.3 km^{2} (691.6 sq mi)

Population (2012)
  - Total: 219,900
  - Density: 122.8/km^{2} (317.9/sq mi)
- Time zone: UTC+8 (China standard time)
- Postal code: 727400
- Licence plates: 陕J
- Website: www.lcx.gov.cn

Luochuan County (simplified Chinese: 洛川县; traditional Chinese: 洛川縣; pinyin: Luòchuān Xiàn) is a county in the south of Yan'an City, located in the north of Shaanxi province, China. The county has a total area of 1,791.3 square kilometres (691.6 mi^{2}), and a population of 219,900 as of 2012.

== Etymology ==
The county is named for the Luo River, which passes through the county.

== Administrative divisions ==
Luochuan County is divided into one subdistrict, seven towns, and one township. The county's sole subdistrict is Fengqi Subdistrict, which is home to the county's administrative offices. The county's seven towns are Jiuxian, Jiaokouhe, Laomiao, Tuji, Shitou, Huaibai, and Yongxiang. The county's sole township is Pudi Township.

== Geography ==
The area is largely hilly, with an average elevation of 1,072 metres (3,517 ft) in height. The Luo River flows through the county from its north to its southeast. The county is approximately 95 kilometres (59 mi) to the south of Yan'an's urban core, and approximately 200 kilometres (120 mi) to the north of Xi'an's urban core.

=== Climate ===
Luochuan County has an average annual temperature of 9.2 °C (48.6 °F), receiving an average annual rainfall of 620 millimetres (24 in), and an average of 2,525 hours of sunshine annually.

Climate data for Luochuan, elevation 1,088 m (3,570 ft), (1991–2020 normals, extremes 1981–2010)
Month	Jan	Feb	Mar	Apr	May	Jun	Jul	Aug	Sep	Oct	Nov	Dec	Year
Record high °C (°F)	15.4 (59.7)	20.5 (68.9)	27.7 (81.9)	33.9 (93.0)	33.8 (92.8)	37.5 (99.5)	35.1 (95.2)	34.6 (94.3)	35.0 (95.0)	27.8 (82.0)	22.9 (73.2)	16.6 (61.9)	37.5 (99.5)
Mean daily maximum °C (°F)	2.0 (35.6)	6.0 (42.8)	12.2 (54.0)	19.1 (66.4)	23.4 (74.1)	27.1 (80.8)	28.0 (82.4)	26.3 (79.3)	21.6 (70.9)	16.2 (61.2)	9.9 (49.8)	3.5 (38.3)	16.3 (61.3)
Daily mean °C (°F)	−3.8 (25.2)	−0.1 (31.8)	5.7 (42.3)	12.3 (54.1)	16.8 (62.2)	20.9 (69.6)	22.5 (72.5)	20.9 (69.6)	16.2 (61.2)	10.4 (50.7)	3.9 (39.0)	−2.2 (28.0)	10.3 (50.5)
Mean daily minimum °C (°F)	−8.9 (16.0)	−5.1 (22.8)	0.3 (32.5)	6.4 (43.5)	10.8 (51.4)	15.3 (59.5)	17.9 (64.2)	16.7 (62.1)	11.9 (53.4)	5.5 (41.9)	−1.0 (30.2)	−7.2 (19.0)	5.2 (41.4)
Record low °C (°F)	−20.5 (−4.9)	−16.4 (2.5)	−15.8 (3.6)	−4.6 (23.7)	−0.3 (31.5)	5.3 (41.5)	11.5 (52.7)	9.2 (48.6)	0.1 (32.2)	−7.7 (18.1)	−16.6 (2.1)	−23.0 (−9.4)	−23.0 (−9.4)
Average precipitation mm (inches)	7.8 (0.31)	10.6 (0.42)	18.8 (0.74)	34.8 (1.37)	55.0 (2.17)	75.6 (2.98)	120.9 (4.76)	113.0 (4.45)	86.2 (3.39)	50.8 (2.00)	18.5 (0.73)	4.7 (0.19)	596.7 (23.51)
Average precipitation days (≥ 0.1 mm)	3.4	4.2	5.4	6.8	8.7	9.1	12.7	11.9	10.7	8.9	5.0	2.8	89.6
Average snowy days	4.7	5.3	3.6	0.6	0	0	0	0	0	0.4	3.1	3.9	21.6
Average relative humidity (%)	51	52	50	50	55	61	74	78	76	70	60	51	61
Mean monthly sunshine hours	203.6	189.0	220.0	240.1	256.3	248.7	235.4	224.0	179.5	188.1	189.3	205.3	2,579.3
Percentage possible sunshine	65	61	59	61	59	57	54	54	49	55	62	68	59
Source: China Meteorological Administration

== History ==
After the outbreak of the Japanese invasion of China, the Chinese Communist Party held a meeting in Luochuan known as the Luochuan Conference, for the purpose of formulating a plan as to how best repel the Japanese forces. The conference, which took place from August 22 to August 25, 1937 was attended by important figures within the party, such as Mao Zedong, Zhou Enlai, and Zhu De. The conference put forth the ideals of the "Ten Outlines to Resist Japan and Save the Country" proposed by Mao, which outlined how to mobilize and unify the country to fight the Japanese.

== Economy ==
Luochuan County is known for its apple production. In 2010, there were 3.1 mu of apple orchards per capita, the highest ratio in the country. Inspired by a visit to orchards in Japan, the county began promoting a strategy of increased spacing between trees in 2006, which helped yield higher quality apples.

== Transportation ==
A number of important highways run through the county, such as China National Highway 210, the G65 Baotou-Maoming Expressway, and Shaanxi Provincial Road 304. The Xi'an-Yan'an Railway also passes through the Luochuan County.

== See also ==
- Northern Shaanxi
- Loess Plateau
- Shaan-Gan-Ning Border Region
