= Red tourism =

Tourism at communist locations

- Simplified Chinese: 红色旅游
- Traditional Chinese: 紅色旅遊
Transcriptions
Standard Mandarin
- Hanyu Pinyin: hóngsè lǚyóu

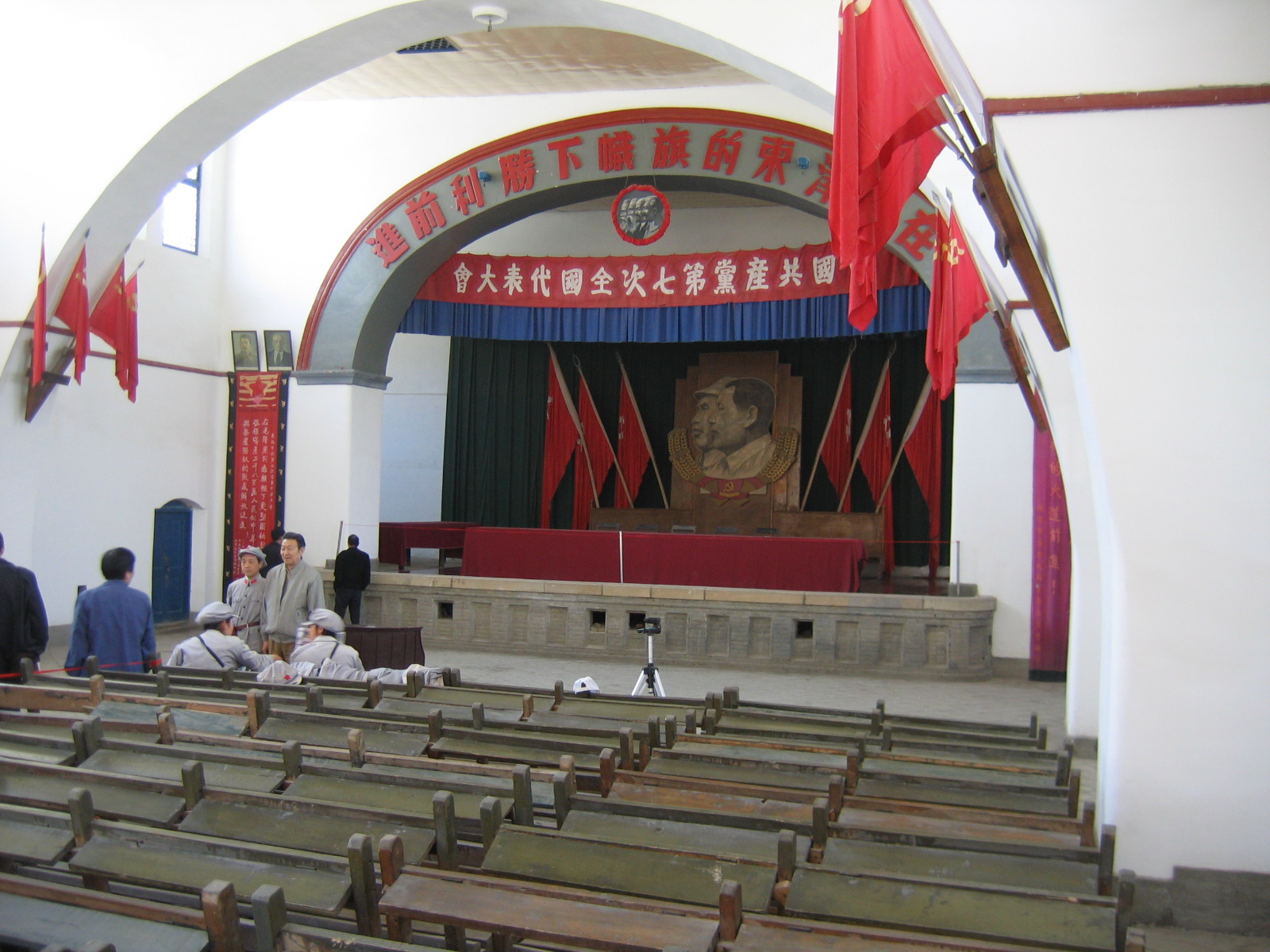
Tourists in Yan'an can rent and dress in Chinese Red Army garb in the Yangjialing Revolutionary Site

Red tourism (Chinese: 红色旅游; pinyin: hóngsè lǚyóu; Russian: красный туризм, romanized: krasniy turizm) is tourism at locations significant to communism. It is a subset of domestic and international tourism in current or former communist countries such as China and Russia, in which people visit locations with historical significance to their "red" (communist) past.

In the People's Republic of China, tourists visit locations with historical significance to the Chinese Communist Party (CCP) "to rekindle their long-lost sense of class struggle and proletarian principles."

== State support ==
The Office of National Red Tourism Coordination Group (ONRTCG or 'the Red Office') is in charge of red tourism in the People's Republic of China. The Chinese government began actively supporting red tourism in 2005 to promote the "national ethos" and socioeconomic development in those areas, which are typically rural and poorer than East China. The promotion of red tourism thus has both political educational goals and economic goals associated with the broader promotion of domestic tourism. The "General Plan for the Development of Red Tourism in 2004-2010" (2004-2010年全国红色旅游发展规划纲要), issued by the General Office of the Chinese Communist Party and the General Office of the State Council, established the first batch of 100 so-called "red tourism classic scenic spots" (红色旅游经典景区). Various sites were designated as red tourism bases, cities, and classic sites under this plan.

In 2012, officials representing several Chinese cities signed a "China Red Tourism Cities Strategic Cooperation Yan'an Declaration" to develop red tourism. Those cities were Guang'an, Yan'an, Jinggangshan, Ruijin, Zunyi, Shijiazhuang, Qingyang, Chishui, Longyan, and Shaoshan.

In the CCP's view, red tourism strengthens revolutionary traditions, enhances patriotism, and promotes a unique national spirit. A Chinese official said, "This is a major project that benefits both the Party, the nation and the people, either in the economic, cultural and the political sense." In 2004, People's Daily described red tourism as contributing to a virtuous cycle in which through the socialist market economy, social benefits and economic benefits are integrated and "spiritual wealth is transformed into social wealth." Xi Jinping recommends that Chinese visit these revolutionary sites to develop "historical confidence" in socialism.

== Locations ==
The number of red tourism sites has continuously grown since its inception in 2005. Significant sites include:

- The Site of the First National Congress of the Chinese Communist Party in Shanghai.
- Gutian, site of the Gutian Congress, where in 1929 the 9th Party Congress was held, and a resolution by Mao Zedong was passed, addressing ideological splits in the military and party, and establishing the principle of the "Party Leading The Army" in which the army is a subordinate of the party, and should carry out the political tasks of the revolution.
- Yan'an, near the endpoint of the Long March, and thus became the center of the Chinese Communist Revolution from 1936 to 1948. Chinese communists celebrate Yan'an as the birthplace of the revolution. Tourists can participate in daily mock battles portraying "The Defense of Yan'an" against Chinese Nationalist Army forces. The "Golden Yan'an" tourist city features old-fashioned Chinese streets and shops in the style of the 1930s Yan'an Soviet. The major attraction of Golden Yan'an is "The Ode of Yan'an" show, which depicts historical moments from the Communist Party's Yan'an period presented with a light show on the mountains and an audio-visual projection on Baota Mountain. The Yan'an Revolutionary Memorial Hall is a museum which covers the period when the Chinese Communist Party was based in Yan'an.
- Jinggangshan, the cradle of the Chinese Communist Revolution, where Mao Zedong and other leading members of the Chinese Communist Party established the first rural base for the revolution in 1927.
- Zunyi, the site of the Zunyi Conference
- Japanese Germ Warfare Experimental Base in Harbin
- Xifeng Concentration Camp, in Xifeng County
- Shaoshan, the birthplace of Mao Zedong
- Hainan Island
- Nanjie, Henan province: Small village where its local residents still live under Maoist ideas and live according to commune principles.
- Nanchang, Jiangxi Province: Site of the Nanchang Uprising (August 1, 1927).
- Chongqing: CPC sites from WWII.
- Ruijin, Jiangxi Province: Headquarters of the CPC in the early 1930s.
- Tingzhou, Fujian, where leaders of the CPC such as Mao Zedong and Zhou Enlai took refuge during the early years of the civil war.

Other significant sites for red tourism in China include Dazhai village in Shanxi province which was promoted for its model agricultural work in the Mao-era learn from Dazhai campaign. Dazhai hosts the Chinese Dream Red-Theme museum.

Liangjiahe, where Xi Jinping lived for seven years during the Cultural Revolution, is also a significant red tourism location.

== Events ==
The China Red Tourism and Cultural Festival is held annually in Hunan. The 2010 Festival took place in July and took advantage of high-speed rail in China.

During the 100th Anniversary of the Chinese Communist Party, the Shanghai local government promoted visits to the sites of the CCP's First National Congress, Second National Congress, and Fourth National Congress.

== Development ==
The Patriotic Education Campaign contributed to the development of red tourism, particularly through its establishment of "Patriotic Education Bases".

Red tourism first developed in comparatively small villages around the mid-1990s. According to the China National Knowledge Infrastructure databases, the term hóngsè lǚyóu 红色旅游 (red tourism) first appeared in a mainstream publication in 1996, when the term was used by the head of the Women's Committee of China's Old Region Development Program.

A significant rise in red tourism occurred in the late 1990s, prompted by the development of tourism as a significantly profitable economic sector and celebrations and commemorations related to the Communist Party's past becoming settled into tradition.

At the end of 2004, the central government issued its 2004-2010 National Red Tourism Development Outline, which provided a guideline for subsequent developments in red tourism. It characterized the development of red tourism as significant in instilling patriotism, revolutionary spirit, and promoting socioeconomic development in the revolutionary base areas.

== Impact ==
According to academics Christopher Marquis and Kunyuan Qiao, red tourism in China has a significant impact in intergenerational transmission of Mao Zedong's political theory. Through multilateral marketing and massive consumption, red tourism helps to enhance Chinese regime's political legitimacy. It 'softly' improves Chinese state's image without eliciting social resistance.

Aging original members of the Red Army criticize the Disneyfication of what should be solemn war memorials.

== Outside China ==
Other former Communist countries can have red tourism, such as the Czech Republic, previously part of Czechoslovakia and ruled by the Communist Party of Czechoslovakia.

In North Korea, Revolutionary Sites are a part of red tourism in the country.

=== Russia ===
Recently, Russian researchers started to focus on the studying of the trend of Russian-Chinese tourism development. To attract red tourism business from China, Russian tourism authorities developed the "red circuit", an eight-day tour through multiple cities focused on the life of Vladimir Lenin.

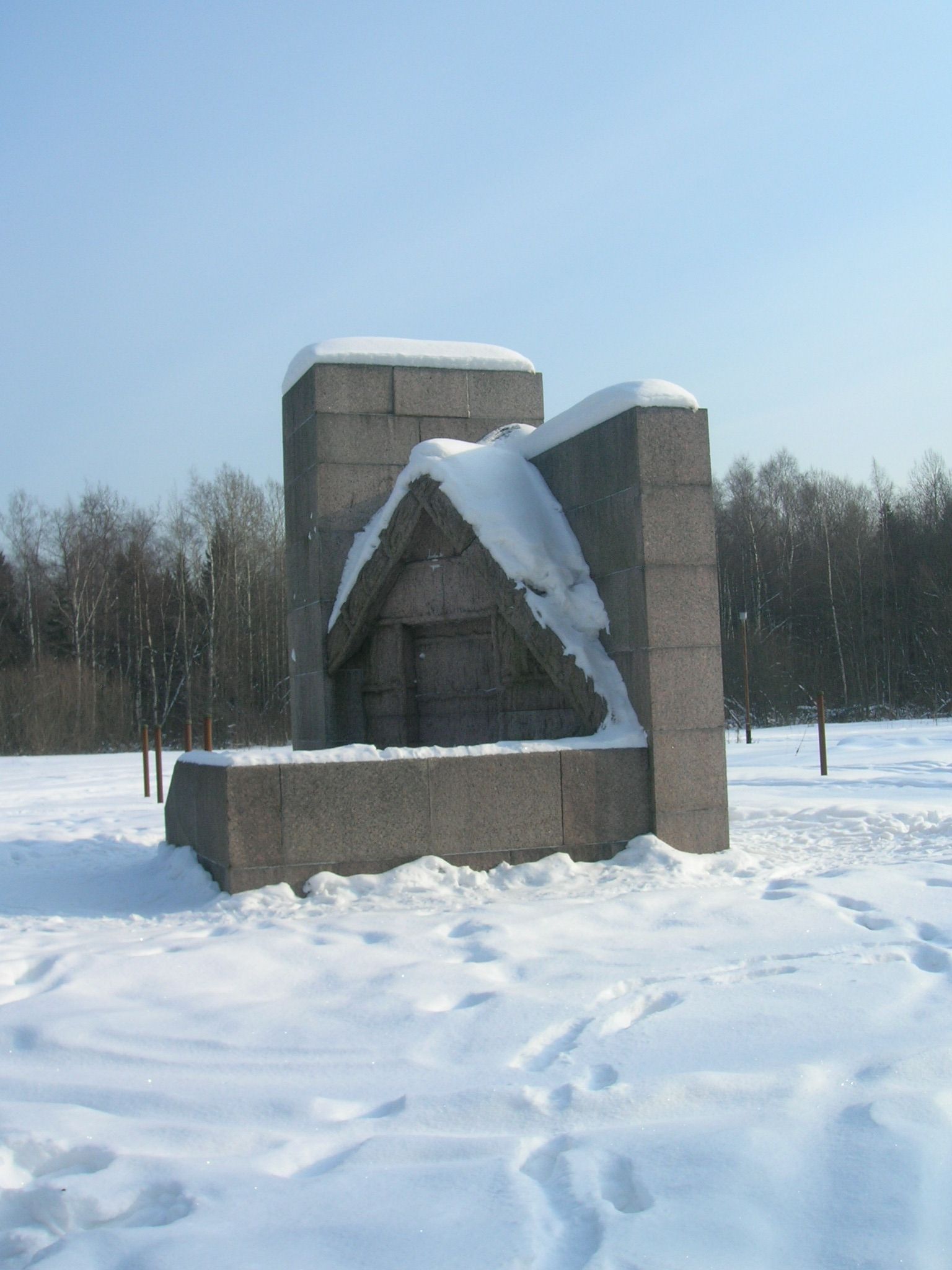
Lenin's Hovel, his hideout in July 1917

==== Locations ====
- Gorki Leninskiye, Lenin's dacha and his place of death.
- Lenin's Mausoleum.
- Worker and Kolkhoz Woman.
- Tomb of the Unknown Soldier.
- Sparrow Hills.
- Exhibition of Achievements of National Economy.
- Tagansky Protected Command Point.
- Ulyanovsk Memorial Museum of Vladimir Lenin.
- Ulyanovsk Statue of Lenin.
- Home of the Ulyanov family, Lenin's place of residence from 1878 to 1887.
- Kazan Federal University, the university Lenin was expelled from for political activity.
- Kazan Museum of Socialist Life.
- Kazan House-Museum of Lenin, Ulyanov family house in Kazan.
- Finland Station, the location of Lenin's return to Russia.
- Palace Square.
- Kshesinskaya Mansion, where Lenin presented the April Theses in 1917.
- Museum-apartment of Elizarovs, Lenin's place of residence after his return to Russia.
- Winter Palace.
- Lenin's Shack, a museum complex near Saint-Petersburg.
- Objects of the defense of Leningrad.
- Peter and Paul Fortress.
