= Fu County =

Fuxian 富县
- County
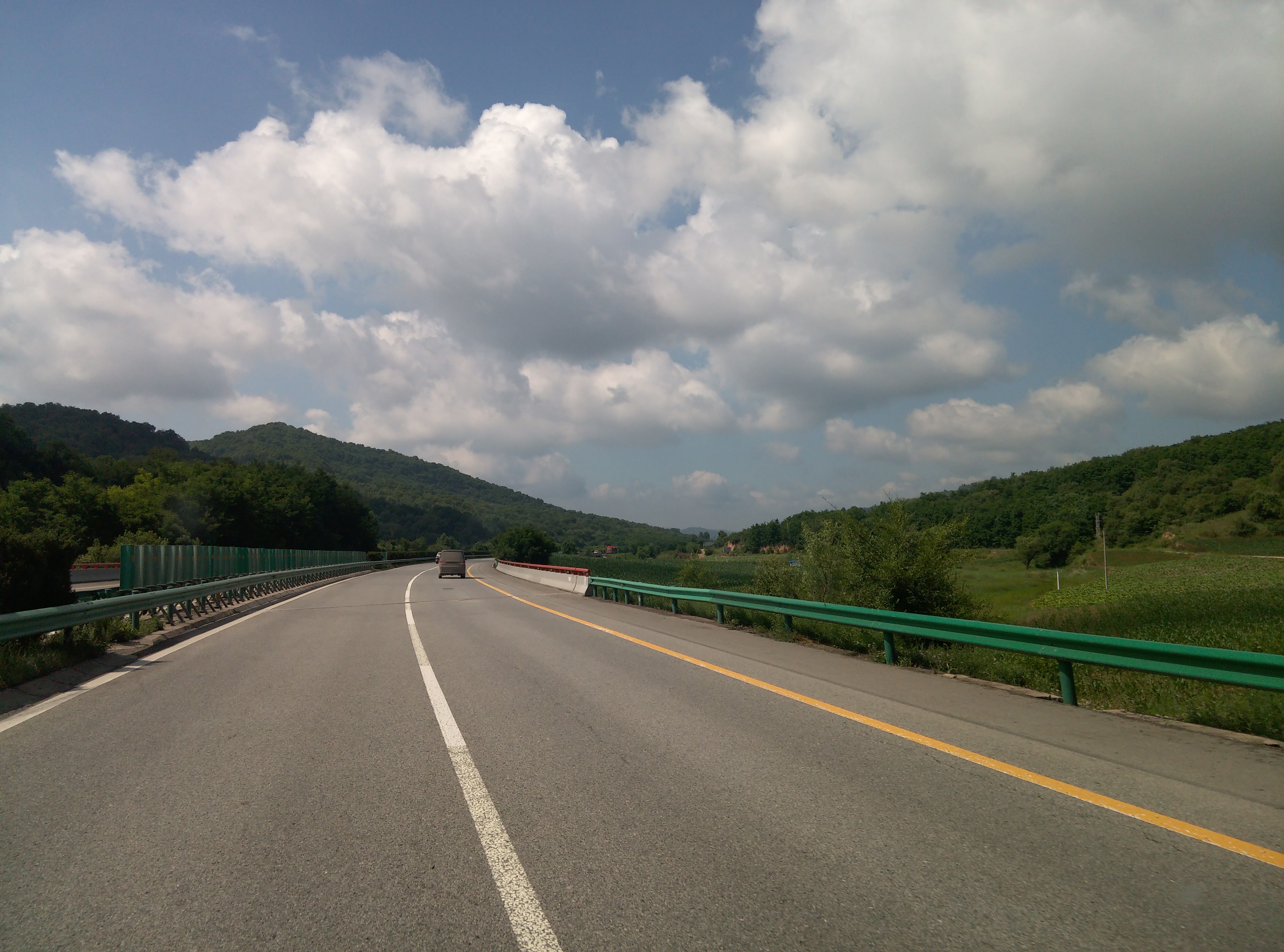

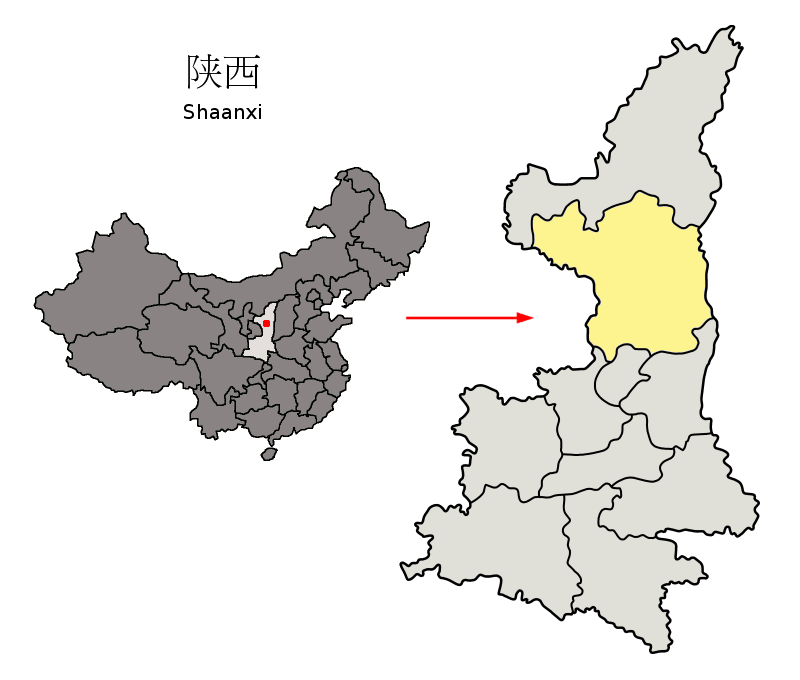
- Coordinates (Fu County government): 35°59′17″N 109°22′44″E
- Country: People's Republic of China
- Province: Shaanxi
- Prefecture-level city: Yan'an

Area
  - Total: 4,179.9 km^{2} (1,613.9 sq mi)

Population (2012)
  - Total: 150,500
  - Density: 36.01/km^{2} (93.25/sq mi)
- Time zone: UTC+8 (China standard time)
- Postal code: 727500

Fu County or Fuxian (simplified Chinese: 富县; traditional Chinese: 富縣; pinyin: Fù Xiàn) is a county in the south of Yan'an City, Shaanxi Province, China. The county has an area of 4,179.9 square kilometres (1,613.9 mi^{2}), and a permanent population of 150,500 as of 2012.

== Administrative divisions ==
The county is divided into one subdistrict, six towns, and one township. The county's sole subdistrict, Chafang Subdistrict, is home to the county's administrative offices. The county's six towns are Zhangcunyi, Zhangjiawan, Zhiluo, Niuwu, Sixian, and Yangquan. Fu County's sole township is Beidaode Township. These jurisdictions then in turn are divided into 137 administrative villages.

== Geography ==
The county's area is largely covered by hilly terrain, with the altitude ranging from 846.6 metres (2,778 ft) to 1,687 metres (5,535 ft) above sea level. The Luo River, as well as the Hulu River (葫芦河; Húlu Hé) both flow through the county.

=== Climate ===
Fu County's annual average temperature is 9.8 °C (49.6 °F), with its highest recorded temperature being 38.7 °C (101.7 °F), and its lowest being −26.3 °C (−15.3 °F). The county receives an averages of 2369.3 hours of sunshine per year, an average of 567.5 millimetres (22.34 in) of precipitation per year, and on averages experiences 188 days without frost.

Climate data for Fuxian, elevation 984 m (3,228 ft), (1991–2020 normals, extremes 1981–2010)
Month	Jan	Feb	Mar	Apr	May	Jun	Jul	Aug	Sep	Oct	Nov	Dec	Year
Record high °C (°F)	16.3 (61.3)	23.9 (75.0)	30.2 (86.4)	36.3 (97.3)	36.8 (98.2)	38.8 (101.8)	36.9 (98.4)	36.3 (97.3)	36.8 (98.2)	29.7 (85.5)	25.0 (77.0)	18.6 (65.5)	38.8 (101.8)
Mean daily maximum °C (°F)	3.6 (38.5)	7.8 (46.0)	14.1 (57.4)	21.2 (70.2)	25.2 (77.4)	28.3 (82.9)	30.0 (86.0)	28.2 (82.8)	23.4 (74.1)	17.9 (64.2)	11.4 (52.5)	5.0 (41.0)	18.0 (64.4)
Daily mean °C (°F)	−5.7 (21.7)	−1.2 (29.8)	5.1 (41.2)	12.0 (53.6)	17.2 (63.0)	20.6 (69.1)	23.0 (73.4)	21.3 (70.3)	16.1 (61.0)	9.5 (49.1)	2.4 (36.3)	−4.2 (24.4)	9.7 (49.4)
Mean daily minimum °C (°F)	−12.3 (9.9)	−7.8 (18.0)	−2.1 (28.2)	3.9 (39.0)	11.2 (52.2)	15.1 (59.2)	18.0 (64.4)	16.4 (61.5)	11.3 (52.3)	4.0 (39.2)	−3.5 (25.7)	−10.3 (13.5)	3.7 (38.6)
Record low °C (°F)	−26.5 (−15.7)	−20.1 (−4.2)	−18.5 (−1.3)	−8.0 (17.6)	−4.0 (24.8)	3.6 (38.5)	8.1 (46.6)	6.8 (44.2)	−2.4 (27.7)	−10.8 (12.6)	−19.6 (−3.3)	−26.3 (−15.3)	−26.5 (−15.7)
Average precipitation mm (inches)	4.8 (0.19)	7.9 (0.31)	16.5 (0.65)	30.4 (1.20)	64.4 (2.54)	88.4 (3.48)	124.2 (4.89)	110.7 (4.36)	77.6 (3.06)	43.1 (1.70)	16.9 (0.67)	3.1 (0.12)	588 (23.17)
Average precipitation days (≥ 0.1 mm)	2.7	3.7	5.0	6.9	8.7	9.5	13.3	11.9	10.7	8.7	5.1	2.4	88.6
Average snowy days	4.5	4.8	2.7	0.5	0	0	0	0	0	0.3	2.4	3.6	18.8
Average relative humidity (%)	59	57	54	53	68	73	76	79	79	75	68	61	67
Mean monthly sunshine hours	194.2	181.3	216.3	231.1	244.0	230.5	214.8	196.7	161.9	169.9	173.2	191.8	2,405.7
Percentage possible sunshine	62	59	58	58	56	53	49	48	44	49	57	64	55
Source: China Meteorological Administration

== History ==
The area of present-day Fu County was a part of both the Xia Dynasty and Shang Dynasty, the earliest dynasties in Chinese history. During the Qin Dynasty, the area was incorporated as Diaoyin County (雕阴郡; Diāoyīn Jùn). During the first year of Emperor Sui Yang's rule, the county was reorganized as Fucheng County (鄜城郡; Fūchéng Jùn), which would be changed immediately after his rule in 618 CE to Fu Prefecture (鄜州; Fū Zhōu). It remained this way for approximately 1,300 years until in 1912, under the rule of the Republic of China, Fu Prefecture was reorganized as Fu County (鄜县; Fū xiàn). In 1964, the State Council of the People's Republic of China renamed the county to its current name, Fu County (富县; Fù Xiàn).

== Economy ==
=== Agriculture ===
The county produces a number of agricultural goods, such as apples, tobacco, rice, and a number of animal products. 360,000 mu (24,000 hectares or 59,000 acres) in Fu County are dedicated to growing apples, producing 507,700 tons of apples as of 2015. The county also grows 12,000 mu (800 ha or 2,000 acres) of tobacco, and 6,700 mu (450 ha or 1,100 acres) of rice.

=== Natural Resources ===
Fu County has a number of natural resources, including significant deposits of coal, copper, iron, petroleum, and natural gas. The county reported 62.844 million tons of proven oil reserves, 1.46 billion cubic meters of proven natural gas reserves, and 425 million tons of coal reserves. As of 2015, an oil production plant owned by Yanchang Oilfield produced 188,000 tons of oil, and a plant owned by Sinopec produced 5,175 tons. These two plants combined have 2,591 oil wells, and employ over 400 people. In 2015, the county produced 2.72 million tons of coal.

== Education ==
The county is served by a total of 70 schools of various types, employing 2,077 full-time staff and an additional 1,714 workers.

== Transport ==
=== Road transport ===
- National Highway 210
- National Highway 309
- G22 Qingdao–Lanzhou Expressway
- G65 Baotou–Maoming Expressway

=== Rail transport ===
- Baotou-Xi'an Railway [zh]
- Xi'an–Yan'an Railway
