= Yan River =

River in Shaanxi, China

- Native name: 延河 (Chinese)

Location
- Country: China
- Province: Shaanxi

Physical characteristics
- Mouth: Yellow River
  - coordinates: 36°23′53″N 110°28′45″E
- Length: 286.9 km (178.3 mi)
- Basin size: 7,725 km^{2} (2,983 sq mi)

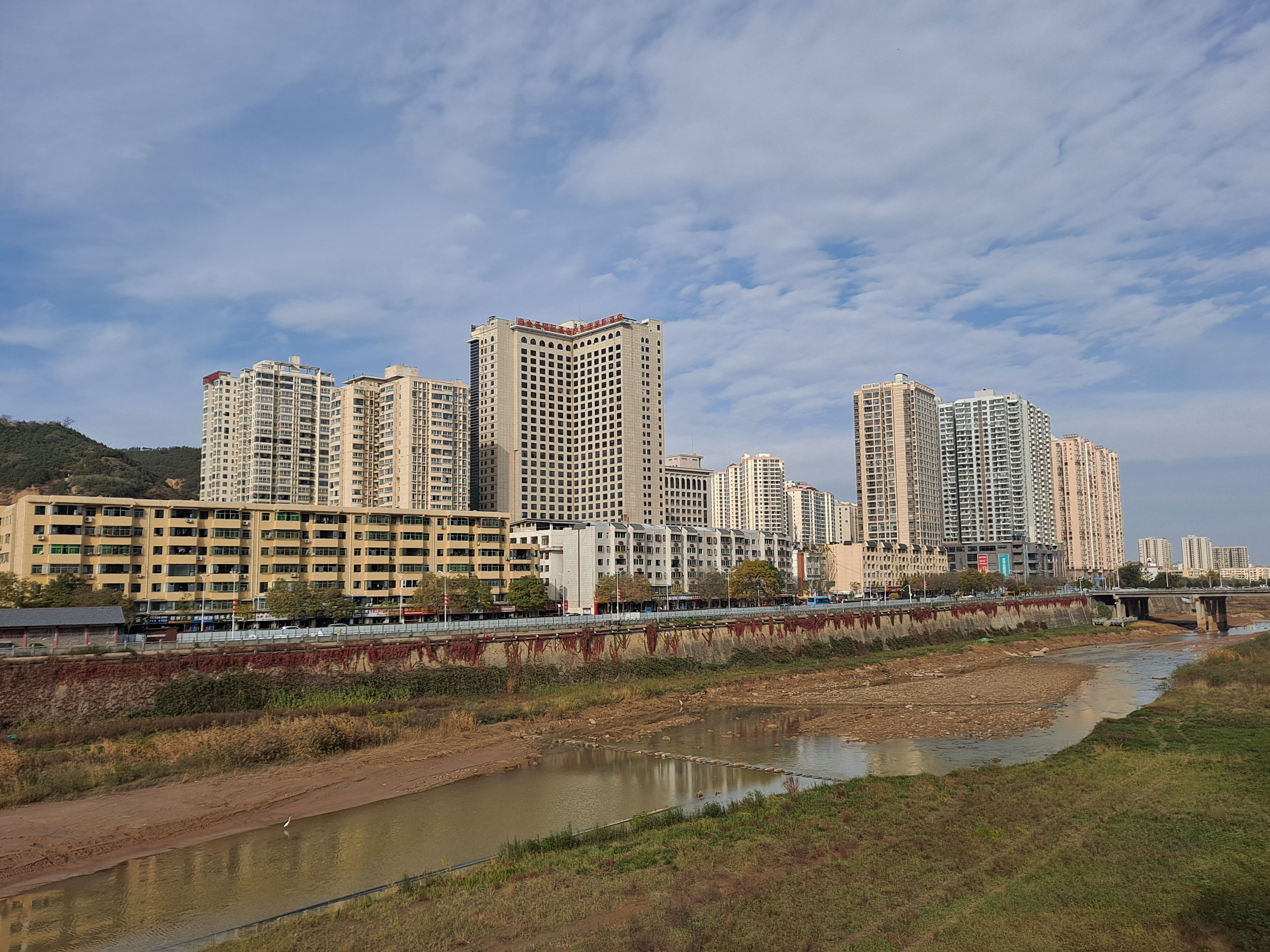
Yan River, 2025

The Yan River (Chinese: 延河; pinyin: Yán Hé) is a river in Shaanxi, China. The river flows from its source, the Xingzi River (Chinese: 杏子河; pinyin: Xìngzi Hé; lit. 'apricot river') in Jingbian County, in the prefecture-level city Yulin, and then flows through neighboring Yan'an, finally flowing into the larger Yellow River in Yanchang County, Yan'an. The Yan River flows a total length of 286.9 kilometres (178.3 mi), and has a total basin area of 7,725 square kilometres (2,983 mi^{2}).

== Geography ==
The Yan River's source is Zhou Mountain (Chinese: 周山), in the town of Tianciwan Jingbian County, Yulin. The river then flows to the south into Yan'an, entering by passing through Ansai District.

The Yan River continues its flow south to Baota District, the urban center of Yan'an. In Baota District, the river passes through Hezhuangping, Qiaogou Subdistrict, Chuankou, Liqu, Yaodian, and finally, Ganguyi. The portion of the river which flows through Baota District totals 62 kilometres (39 mi), and has a basin area of 2,203.68 square kilometres (850.85 mi^{2}).

From Baota District, the river flows east through Yanchang County, where it merges into the larger Yellow River.

== Characteristics ==
The Yan River is highly seasonal, due to the large disparities in the region's wet season and dry season. There is little year-round water flow contributing to the river.

The Yan River's basin follows a gradient of higher elevations in the northwest, and lower elevations in the southeast, resulting in the river's flow in that direction. Due to the geology of the Loess Plateau, the Yan River often follows a highly curvy path, and has a high sand content. Landslides are common in the Yan River's basin. 34% of the basin is covered in forest.

The normal flow of the Yan River is about 4 cubic metres (140 ft^{3}) per second, and the annual average runoff is 220,000,000 cubic metres (290,000,000 yd^{3}). The average sediment transport volume is 16 million tons.

== History ==
Throughout China's long history, the Yan River has been called a number of different names. During the Warring States period, the river was known as the Qushui (Chinese: 区水; pinyin: Qūshuǐ). Later, during the Western Han, the river was called the Weishui (Chinese: 洧水; pinyin: Wěishuǐ). Afterwards, in the Northern and Southern dynasties, and during the Western Wei, the river was known as the Qingshui (Chinese: 清水; pinyin: Qīngshuǐ). During various points after the Western Wei, the river was called a number of other names, including the Jinshui (Chinese: 筋水; pinyin: Jīnshuǐ) and the Zhuojinshui (Chinese: 濯筋水; pinyin: Zhuójīnshuǐ). The current name, the Yan River (Chinese: 延河; pinyin: Yán Hé), is only a more recent name for the river.

== Tributaries ==
The total length of the Yan River's tributaries total 10 kilometres (6.2 mi), and 11 of them have a basin area of over 100 square kilometres (39 mi^{2}).

Tributaries along the Yan River's left bank include the Fengfu River (Chinese: 丰富川; pinyin: Fēngfù Chuān), the Panlong River (Chinese: 蟠龙川; pinyin: Pánlóng Chuān), and the Wuyang River (Chinese: 五阳川; pinyin: Wǔyáng Chuān). Tributaries along the river's right bank include the Xi River (Chinese: 西川; pinyin: Xī Chuān), the Nan River (Chinese: 南川; pinyin: Nán Chuān), and the Masi River (Chinese: 马四川; pinyin: Mǎsì Chuān).
