= Lenin's Hovel =

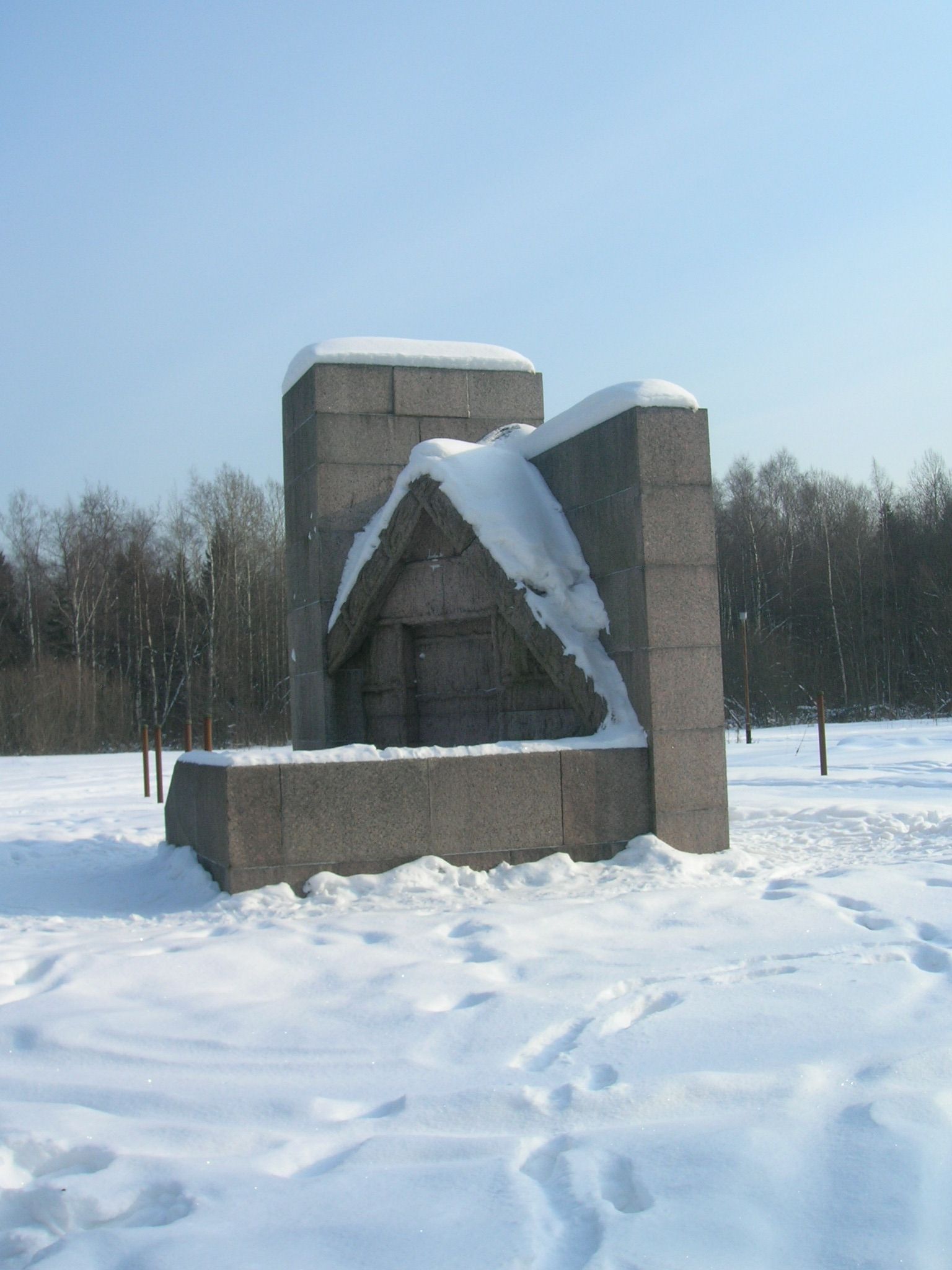
- Lenin's Hovel in 2006
- Interactive map of Lenin's Hovel
- 60.081915°N 30.031192°E
- Type: hut
- Location: Sestroretsk, Kurortny District, St. Petersburg, Russia

History
- Built: July 1917
- Built for: Vladimir Lenin; Grigory Zinoviev

Site notes
- Architect: Nikolai Emelianov

Lenin’s hovel, also known as the Shalash (Russian for "hut"), was a temporary hideout constructed in July 1917 in the meadows of Sestroretsk near Lake Razliv, outside Petrograd. It served as a secluded refuge for Vladimir Lenin and Grigory Zinoviev following the failed July Days uprising.

== Historical background ==
In the aftermath of the failed July Days uprising in 1917, the Russian Provisional Government issued warrants for the arrest of leading Bolsheviks, including Lenin, who was accused of being a German agent. Facing arrest, Lenin fled Petrograd and found refuge in Razliv, where he was hidden by Bolshevik factory worker Nikolai Emelianov.

Initially, Lenin and Zinoviev took shelter in a wooden shed behind Emelianov’s house. As the risk of discovery grew, Emelianov ferried them across Lake Razliv and constructed a hut of hay and branches in a remote meadow.

== Life in hiding ==
While living in the hut, Lenin adopted the guise of a Finnish peasant and continued to lead the Bolshevik movement in secret. He received underground newspapers, coordinated with comrades through liaisons, and worked on The State and Revolution, a text that outlined the theoretical justification for proletarian dictatorship and the use of force to overthrow capitalist structures.

In late July 1917, Lenin left Razliv using forged documents under the alias Konstantin Ivanov and escaped to Finland, from where he would later return to lead the October Revolution.

== Legacy ==
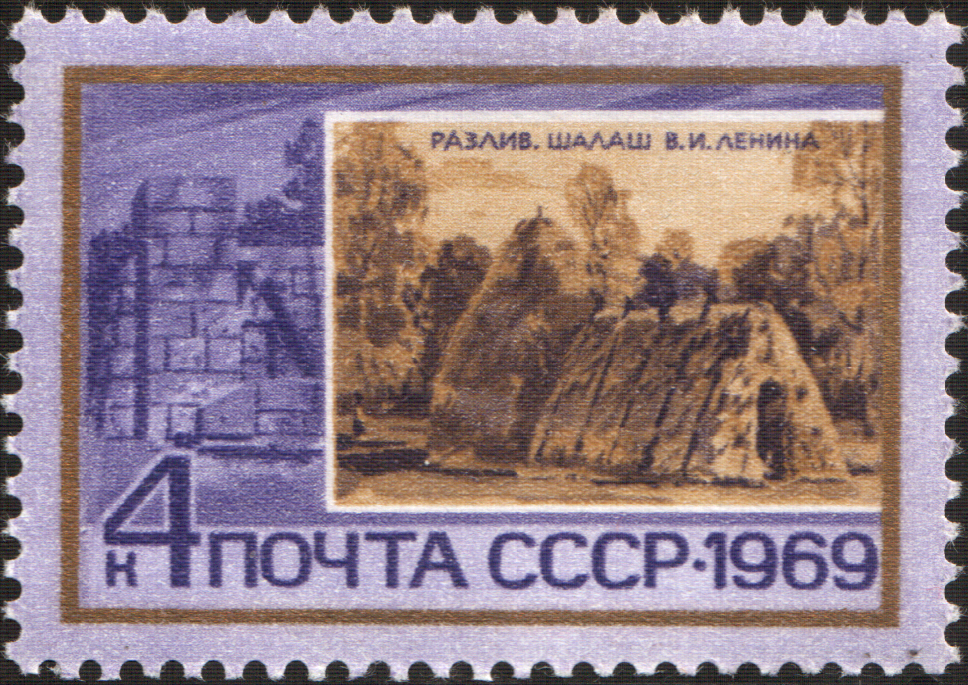
USSR stampː Hay Hut, Razliv.

After Lenin’s death in 1924, the site at Razliv was incorporated into the rapidly expanding cult of Lenin. Emelianov’s shed became an official memorial in 1925, and a stylized monument—resembling the hut but with Constructivist features—was built in 1928 by architect Alexander Gegello.

In 1964, a modernist concrete and glass exhibition pavilion was erected near the hut site to house artifacts and guide visitors, forming part of the Lenin Hut Museum Complex, which included both the Shed Museum (Sarai) and Hut Museum (Shalash).
