= Yan'an =

Yan'an 延安市 Yenan
- Prefecture-level city
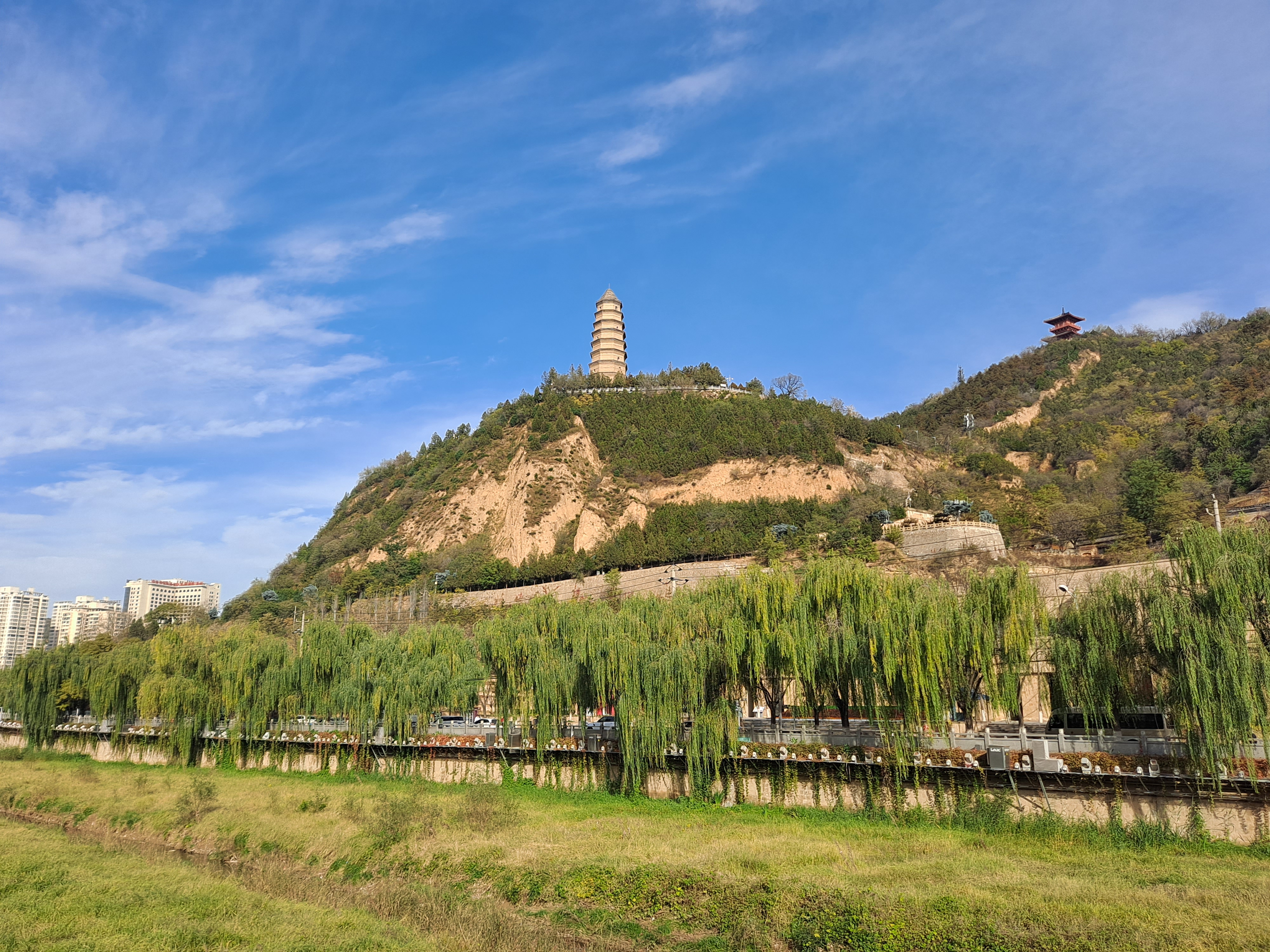
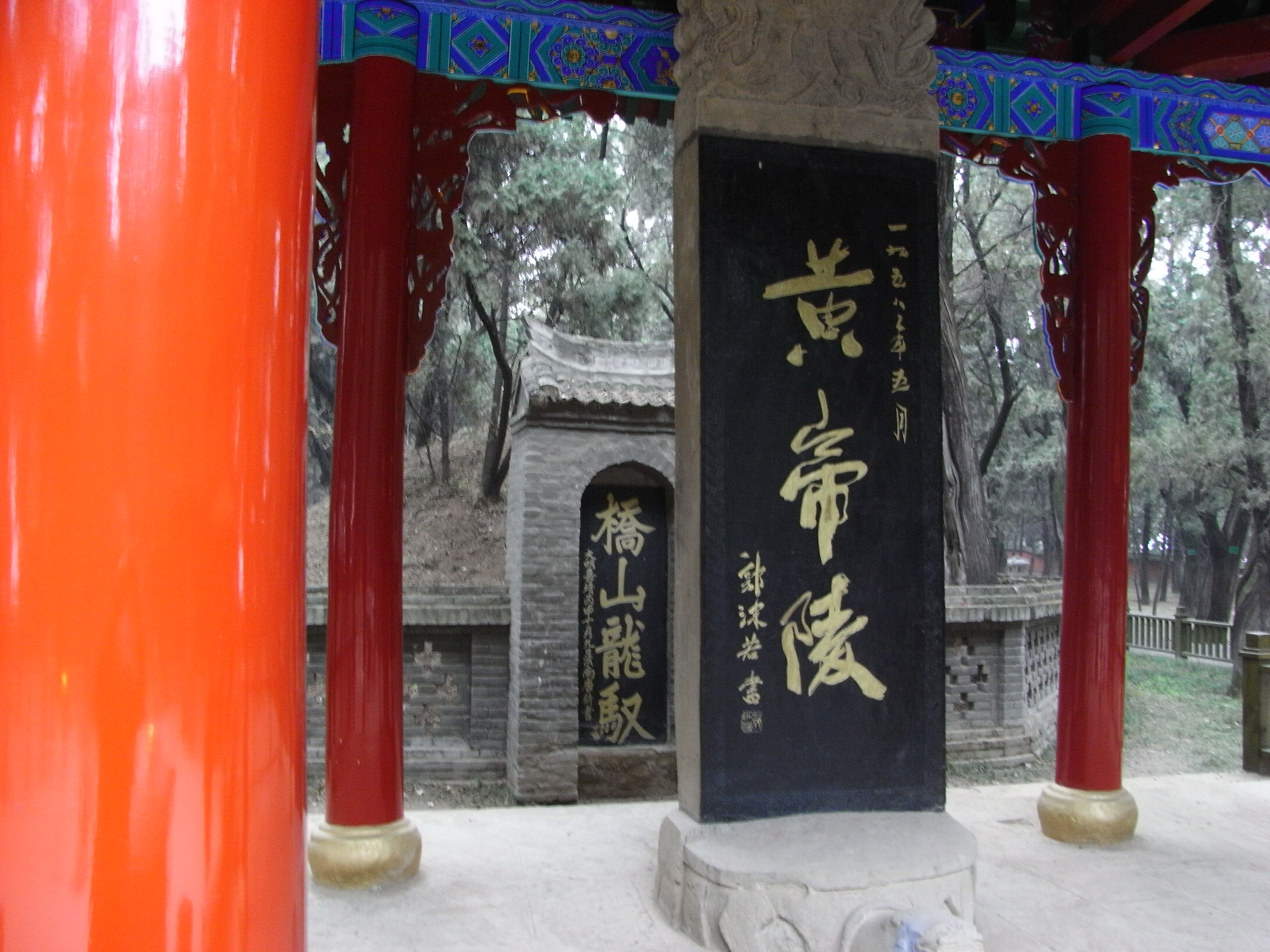
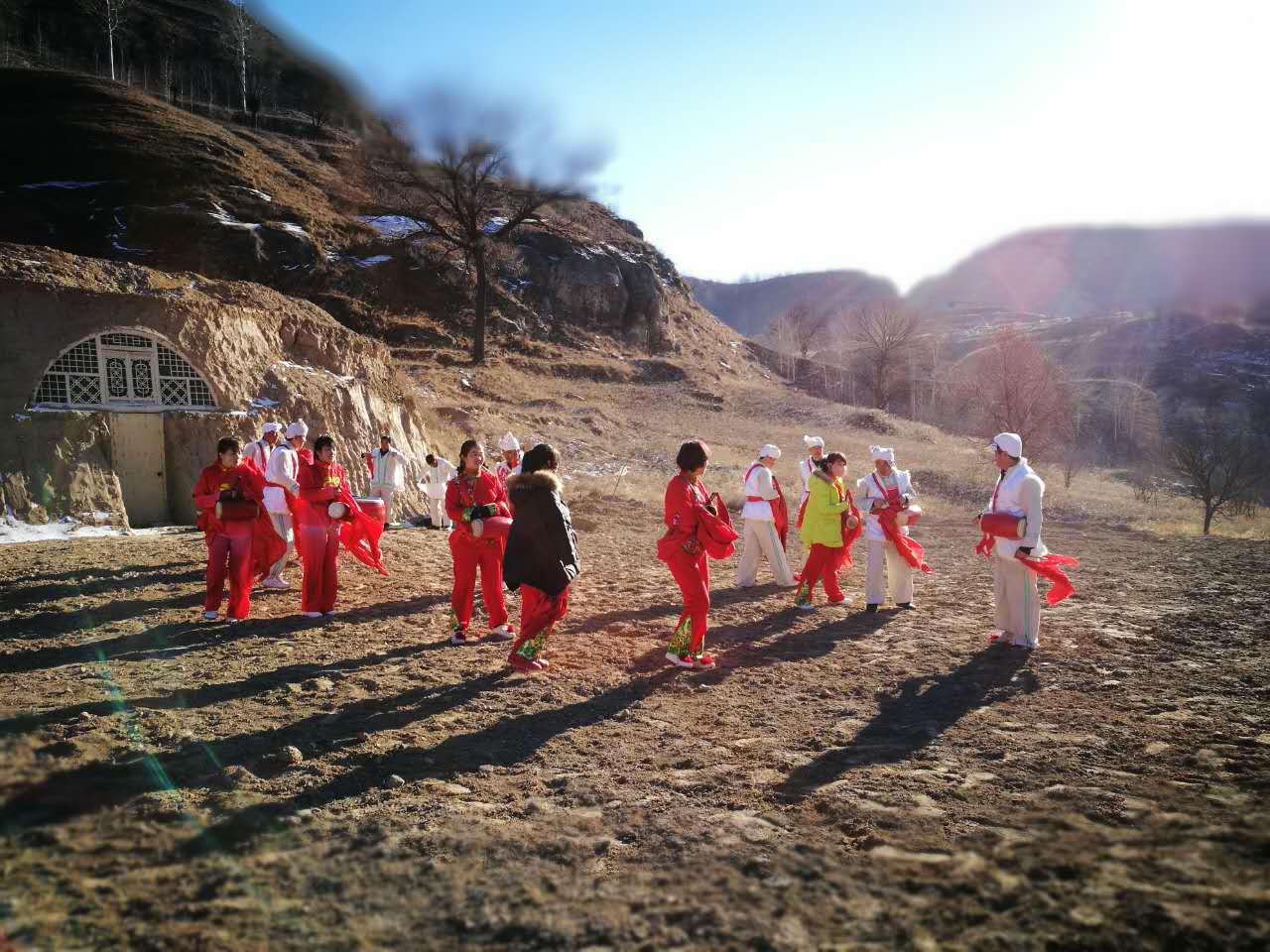
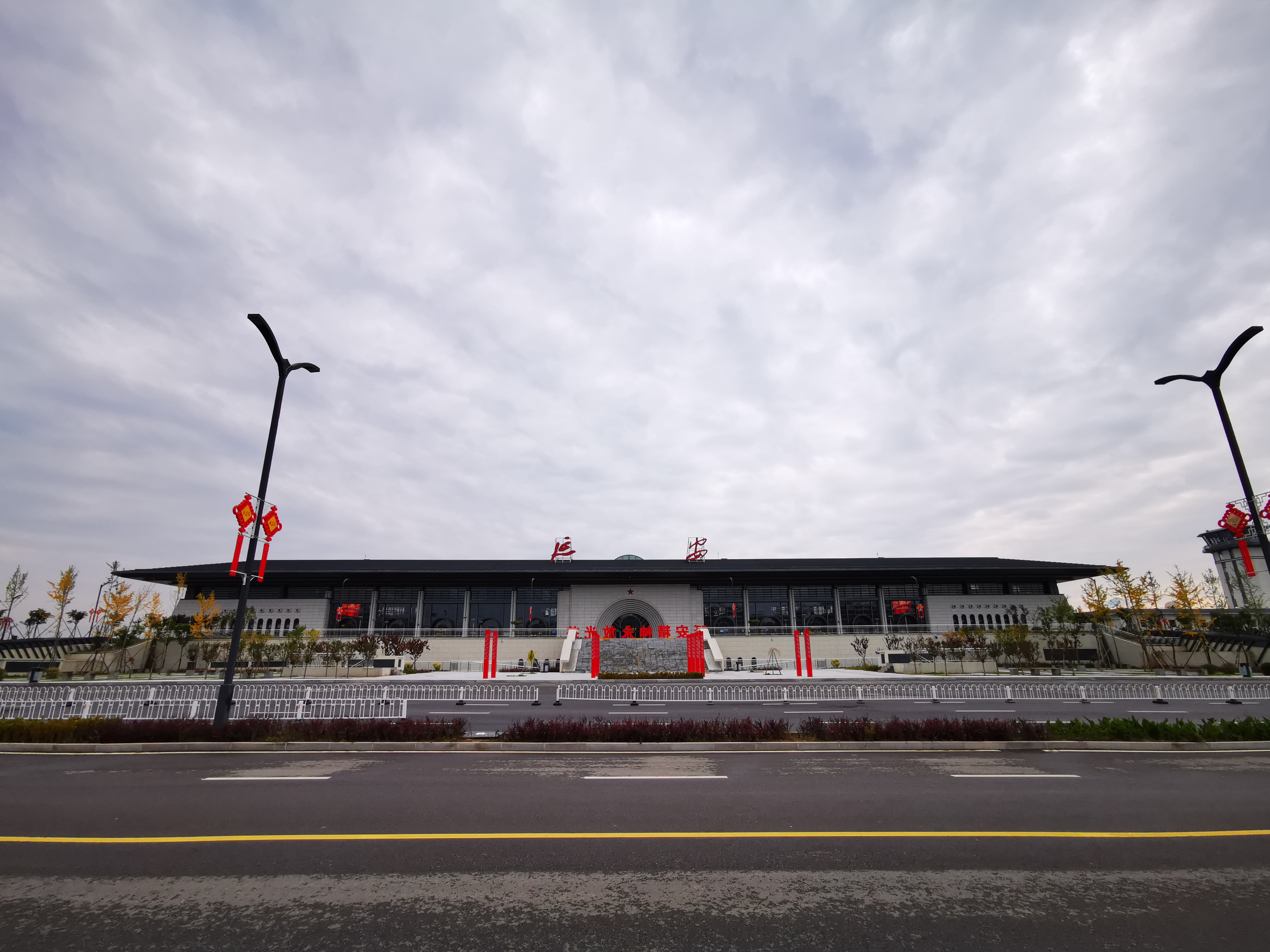
- Lingshan Pagoda on Baota Mountain Yellow Emperor Mausoleum Waist drums in Ansai District Nanniwan Airport

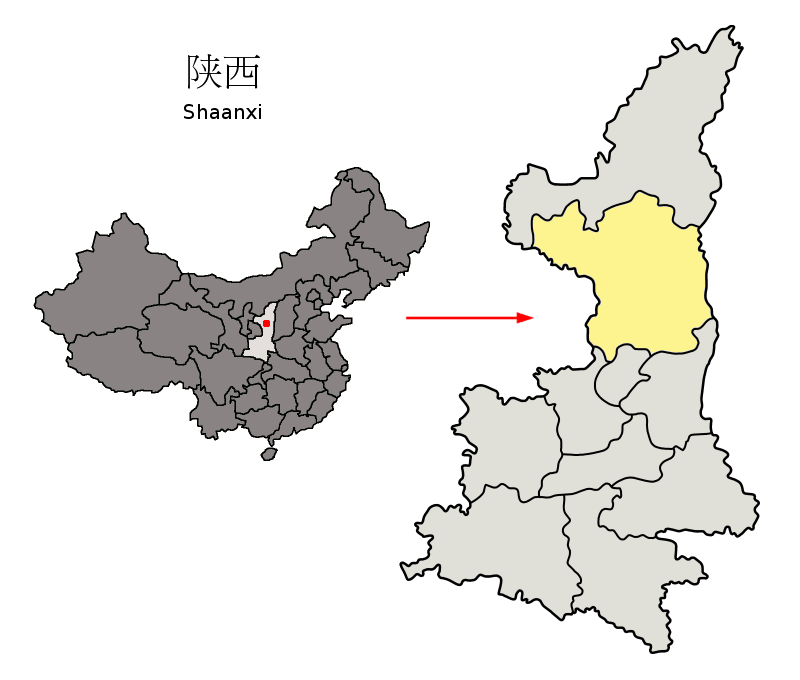
- Location of Yan'an City jurisdiction in Shaanxi

- Location in China
- Coordinates (Yan'an municipal government): 36°39′00″N 109°29′38″E
- Country: People's Republic of China
- Province: Shaanxi
- Municipal seat: Baota District

Area
  - Total: 37,031.3 km^{2} (14,297.9 sq mi)
- Elevation: 960 m (3,150 ft)

Population (2019)
  - Total: 2,255,700
  - Density: 60.913/km^{2} (157.76/sq mi)

GDP
  - Total: CN¥ 120 billion US$ 19.2 billion
  - Per capita: CN¥ 53,908; US$ 8,655
- Time zone: UTC+8 (China Standard)
- ISO 3166 code: CN-SN-06
- License plates: 陕J
- Website: www.yanan.gov.cn

Yan'an
- "Yán'ān" in Chinese characters
- Chinese: 延安
- Postal: Yenan
- Literal meaning: "Prolonged Peace"
Transcriptions
Standard Mandarin
- Hanyu Pinyin: Yán'ān
- Bopomofo: ㄧㄢˊ ㄢ
- Wade–Giles: Yen^{2}-an^{1}
- IPA: [jɛ̌n.án]
Yue: Cantonese
- Yale Romanization: Yìhn'ōn
- Jyutping: Jin4-on1
- IPA: [jin˩.ɔn˥]

Yan'an (Note: Chinese: 延安; pinyin: Yán'ān; Mandarin pronunciation: [jɛ̌n.án]; alternatively spelled as Yenan) is a prefecture-level city in the Shaanbei region of Shaanxi province, China, bordering Shanxi to the east and Gansu to the west. It administers several counties, including Zhidan (formerly Bao'an), which served as the headquarters of the Chinese Communist Party (CCP) before the city of Yan'an proper took that role.

Yan'an was near the endpoint of the Long March, and became the center of the Chinese Communist Revolution from late 1935 to early 1947. Chinese communists celebrate Yan'an as the birthplace of the revolution.

As of 2019, Yan'an has approximately 2,255,700 permanent residents.

== History ==
=== Northern commandery ===
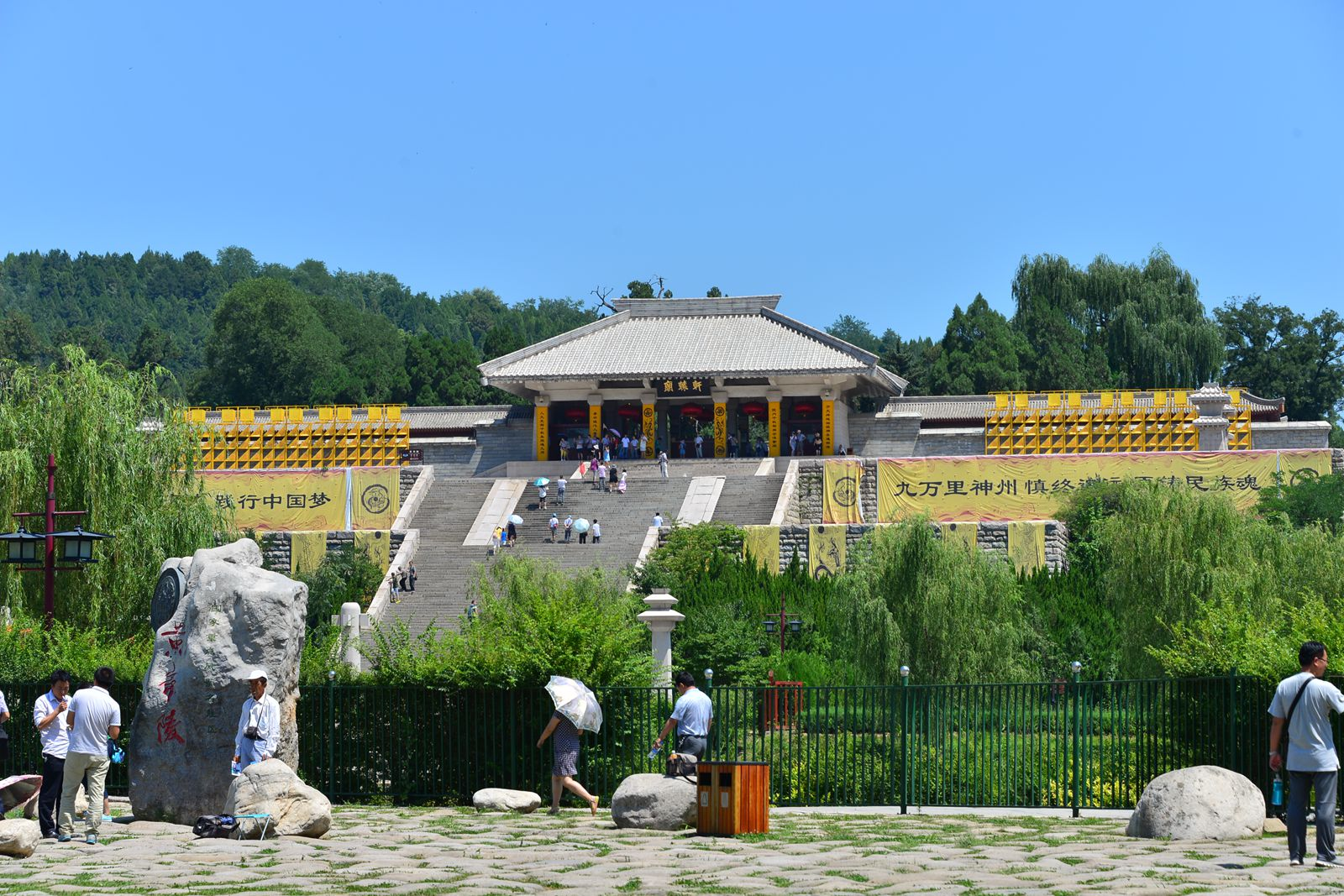
Xuanyuan Temple in Huangling County

Yan'an was populated at least as early as the Xia dynasty, when it formed part of Yong Prefecture. The area was not part of the subsequent Shang dynasty, and was instead inhabited by the Guifang, who fought against the Shang dynasty. The area was later inhabited by the Quanrong and the Xianyun during the Western Zhou period. During the Spring and Autumn period, the area was inhabited by the Beidi people. In the early portions of the Warring States period, the central and northern parts of present-day Yan'an belonged to the state of Wei, while the southern part belonged to the state of Qin. Later on in the Warring States period, the whole area was conquered by the Qin state.

Upon the establishment of the Qin dynasty in 221 BCE, the area was organized as part of Shang Commandery. The area remained part of Shang Commandery during the Han dynasty. The area's administrative divisions were reorganized during the Northern Wei: the southern portion was organized as Beihua Prefecture, which comprised Zhongbu Commandery, Fucheng Commandery, Yizhou Commandery (simplified Chinese: 义州郡; traditional Chinese: 義州郡), and Lezhou Commandery (simplified Chinese: 乐州郡; traditional Chinese: 樂州郡); the northern portion was organized as Dongxia Prefecture, which comprised Biancheng Commandery (Chinese: 遍城郡), Dingyang Commandery, Shang Commandery, and Shuofang Commandery, as well as Jinming Commandery within Xià Prefecture. During the During the Western Wei, the area was organized as Yan Prefecture, Fu Prefecture, and Dan Prefecture. Under the Sui dynasty, the area was re-organized as Yan'an Commandery, and a military base was established.

During the subsequent Tang dynasty, the area belonged to Guannei Circuit, and it became an important defensive outpost. Upon the Tang dynasty's establishment in 618 CE, three local commanderies were replaced with prefectures. The following year, another prefecture, Fang Prefecture was created in the area of present-day Yan'an. The prefecture system was briefly abolished in 742 CE, resulting in the area's four prefectures being reclassified as commanderies, although this was reverted in 758 CE.

=== Border fortress ===
At the beginning of the Song dynasty, the area's four local prefectures belonged to Yongxingjun Circuit. However, early on in the Song dynasty, the newly formed Tangut-led Western Xia dynasty briefly conquered northwestern portions of present-day Yan'an. Upon reconquering the area, the Song government placed it under the jurisdiction of two military-run jurisdictions known as jun: Bao'an Jun and Dingbian Jun (simplified Chinese: 定边军; traditional Chinese: 定邊軍). In 1041, Fuyan Circuit was established in present-day Yan'an. In 1080, Chinese polymath Shen Kuo was deployed to Yan Prefecture to aid in its defenses against the Western Xia. Around this time, he noted that a landslide on the bank of a large river near Yan Prefecture had revealed an open space several dozens of feet under the ground once the bank collapsed. This underground space contained hundreds of petrified bamboos still intact with roots and trunks, "all turned to stone" as Shen wrote. Shen noted that bamboo does not grow in the area, and he was puzzled during which previous dynasty the bamboos could have grown. Considering that damp and gloomy low places provide suitable conditions for the growth of bamboo, Shen deduced that the area's climate must have fit that description in very ancient times. Although this would have intrigued many of his readers, the study of paleoclimatology in medieval China did not develop into an established discipline. During the autumn months of 1081, Shen was successful in defending Song dynasty territory while capturing several nearby fortified towns of the Western Xia. Emperor Shenzong of Song rewarded Shen with numerous titles for his merit in these battles, and in the sixteen months of Shen's military campaign, he received 273 letters from the Emperor. However, Emperor Shenzong trusted an arrogant military officer who disobeyed the emperor and Shen's proposal for strategic fortifications, instead fortifying what Shen considered useless strategic locations. Furthermore, this officer expelled Shen from his commanding post at the main citadel, so as to deny him any glory in chance of victory. The result of this was nearly catastrophic, as the forces of the arrogant officer were decimated; Xinzhong Yao states that the death toll was 60,000. Nonetheless, Shen was successful in defending his fortifications and the only possible Tangut invasion-route to Yanzhou. However, it was eventually taken over by the Tanguts in 1082 once Shen's defensive victories were marginalized and sacrificed by the new chancellor Cai Que (who handed the city over to the Tanguts as terms of a peace treaty). In 1089, Yan Prefecture was renamed to Yan'an, and was promoted to a fu.

At the start of the Jin dynasty, Fuyan Circuit remained intact, and administered Yan'an Fu, Fu Prefecture, Fang Prefecture, Dan Prefecture, Suide Prefecture, Bao'an Jun, and Dingbian Jun. In 1146, Dingbian Jun was abolished, and in 1171, Bao'an Jun was reorganized as a county. In 1182, Bao'an County was reorganized as Bao'an Prefecture. In 1221, the Mongol Empire, led by Genghis Khan, began its invasion of Shaanxi with the aid of the Western Xia. That year, in the eastern portion of present-day Yan'an, the combined Mongol and Western Xia forces defeated a 30,000-strong Jin army led by general Wanyan Heda.

During the Yuan dynasty, Yan'an Circuit was established, which administered Fu Prefecture, Jia Prefecture, and Suide Prefecture.

=== Ming and Qing ===
In 1369, during the Ming dynasty, Yan'an Circuit was reverted to a fu.

In 1725, during the Qing dynasty, the Fuzhou Directly Administered Prefecture was established in the area, which administered Yan'an Fu and Fu Prefecture. Prior to the Dungan Revolt (1862–1877), much of rural Yan'an was inhabited by Chinese Muslims. Much of its Muslim population was either killed in massacres, or forcibly relocated to areas further northwest, like Gansu. The demographic impacts of this was felt for decades, as the local economy cratered, and insufficient government support hindered recovery efforts: In 1823, Bao'an (present-day Zhidan County) had a population of 51,000, but only 170 remained in 1868; while Yan'an (present-day Baota District) had 61,200 inhabitants in 1823, but only about 10,000 in 1930. One account from a British traveler in 1911 described Yan'an as "a city of pretentious Government Offices long fallen into decay...Gazing down a vista of dim distant years one caught a glimpse of past splendour; but the living forces of which it had been the drapery and symbols had long since died out, leaving stagnation, corruption and decay to reign in its halls".

=== ROC era ===
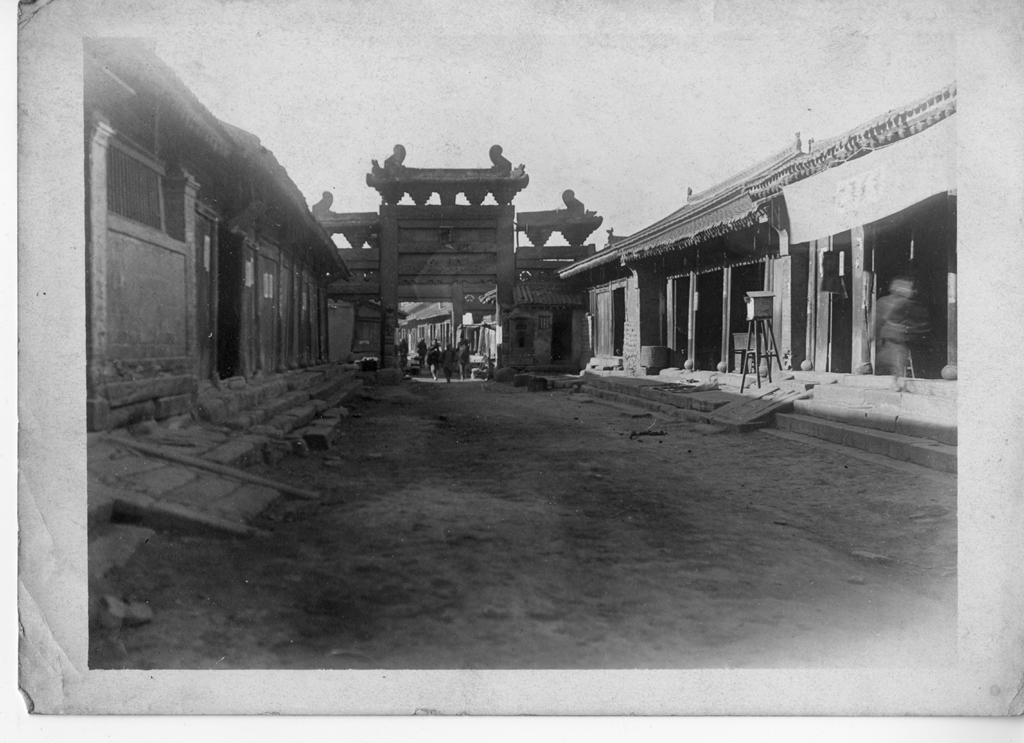
Street in Yan'an, 1914

After the fall of the Qing dynasty, the city became part of the newly created Republic of China, and was reorganized by the Republican government in 1913 under Yulin Circuit. In 1920, the circuit's government was moved to the city of Fushi, within present-day Baota District. Circuits were abolished in 1928, resulting in counties being directly administered by the provincial government.

Throughout the Republic of China era, feudal-like landlordism persisted in Yan'an, and a number of observers found it to be worse in the region than elsewhere in rural China.

=== Red capital of Chinese communism ===
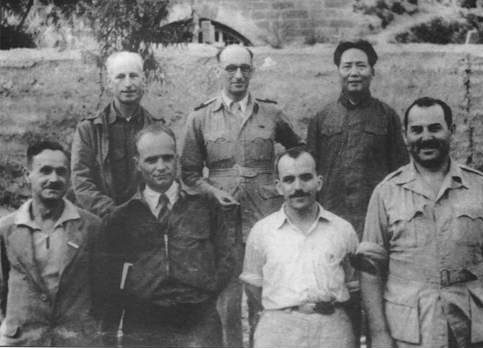
Mao with visiting foreign journalists in 1944

In 1934, two regional soviets were established. In October 1935, following the Long March, forces of the Chinese Red Army arrived in the area from Jiangxi. The following month, communist forces established a regional government in Wayaobu and re-organized regional soviet administrations. In May 1936, the area was re-organized by communist forces as Shaan-Gan-Ning Province (Chinese: 陕甘宁省). In December 1936, at the start of the Second United Front, Yan'an was taken over by the Chinese Communists. When Edgar Snow went there in 1936, it was under Kuomintang control and a Red army siege had recently been lifted. Unknown to him at the time, there had also been contacts there between the Communists and the generals who later staged the Xi'an Incident. Snow actually met Mao at Bao'an (Pao An).

Having rebelled against Chiang, the local warlords decided to hand over Yan'an to the Communists, who were now allies. They pulled out, and in January 1937, the Red Army entered Yan'an, without a fight. Around this time, American journalist Agnes Smedley was covering the Communist Eighth Route Army, which she wrote about in her book Battle Hymn of China.

On September 6, 1937, Yan'an became the seat of the communist government of what became known as the Shaanxi-Gansu-Ningxia Border Region. It became the center for intensive training of party members and army troops. Thousands of intellectuals traveled to Yan'an from all over the country. From 1937 through 1941, the Communist government organized large-scale migrations to Yan'an, predominantly from Suide to the northeast, which was a significantly more densely populated area. Many farmers from the region were attracted to Yan'an for the prospect of working more land, as well as the Communists' land and tax reforms. From 1937 to 1939, over 1,500,000 mu of previously unused land was cleared for agriculture. During this time, the large drive for intense rural labor earned its detractors, and was publicly criticized by some for "giving people a distaste for collective labour". Subsequently, these types of large-scale labor projects would be handled by the army. In 1941, Mao Zedong put special influence on a series of training programs to "correct unorthodox tendencies" and essentially mold the peasantry to the communist model. One of the first CCP programs launched was the Yan'an Rectification Movement.

=== World War II and resumption of the Chinese Civil War ===
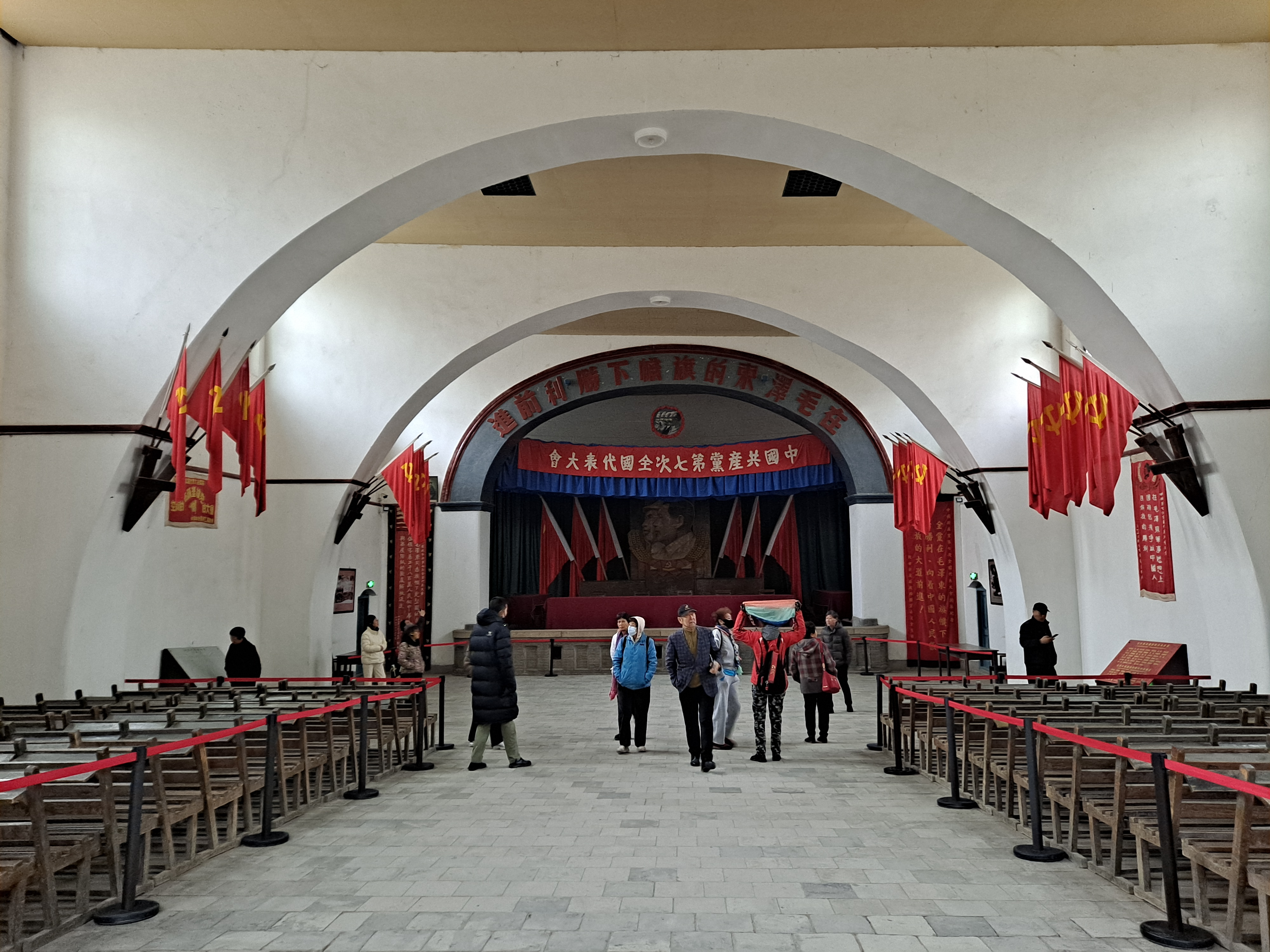
Yangjialing Revolutionary Site

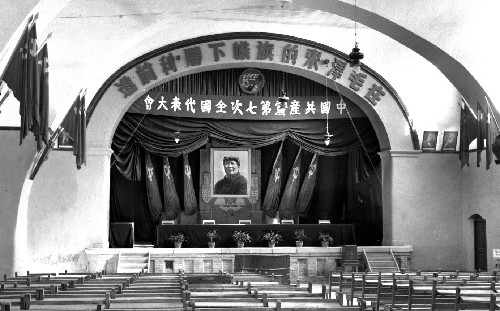
Historic image of the 7th National Congress of the Chinese Communist Party in 1945

During the Second World War almost all buildings, except a pagoda, were destroyed by Japanese bombing, and most inhabitants took to living in yaodongs, artificial caves or dugouts carved into hillsides which were traditional dwellings in Shaanxi. While Yan'an was the center of Chinese communist life many prominent Western journalists including Edgar Snow and Anna Louise Strong met with Mao Zedong and other important leaders for interviews. Other Westerners, such as Hsiao Li and Michael Lindsay, were part of the resistance movement in Yan'an.

In July 1942, Wuqi County was established.

Beginning in 1944, Yan'an played host to the United States Army Observation Group, also known as the Dixie Mission. This group sought to establish relations with Chinese Communist forces, investigate the Communist Party politically and militarily, and determine whether the United States should back Communist forces. Prominent Americans tasked with evaluating the Communist forces politically and militarily include John S. Service of the United States Department of State, and Colonel David D. Barrett of the United States Army. The mission explored possible plans for cooperation against the Japanese. The Americans had a presence in Yan'an from 1944 to 1947.

In May 1945, the government of the Shaanxi-Gansu-Ningxia Border moved from Yan'an to Xi'an.

Yan'an was briefly captured in the Battle of Yan'an by the Kuomintang forces in the Chinese Civil War. The Communist leadership learned of a planned attack in advance, and ultimately voluntarily withdrew from the city. From then until their capture of Beijing they were usually based somewhere else, often with a mobile headquarters. On April 21, 1948, the People's Liberation Army retook Yan'an.

=== After 1949 ===
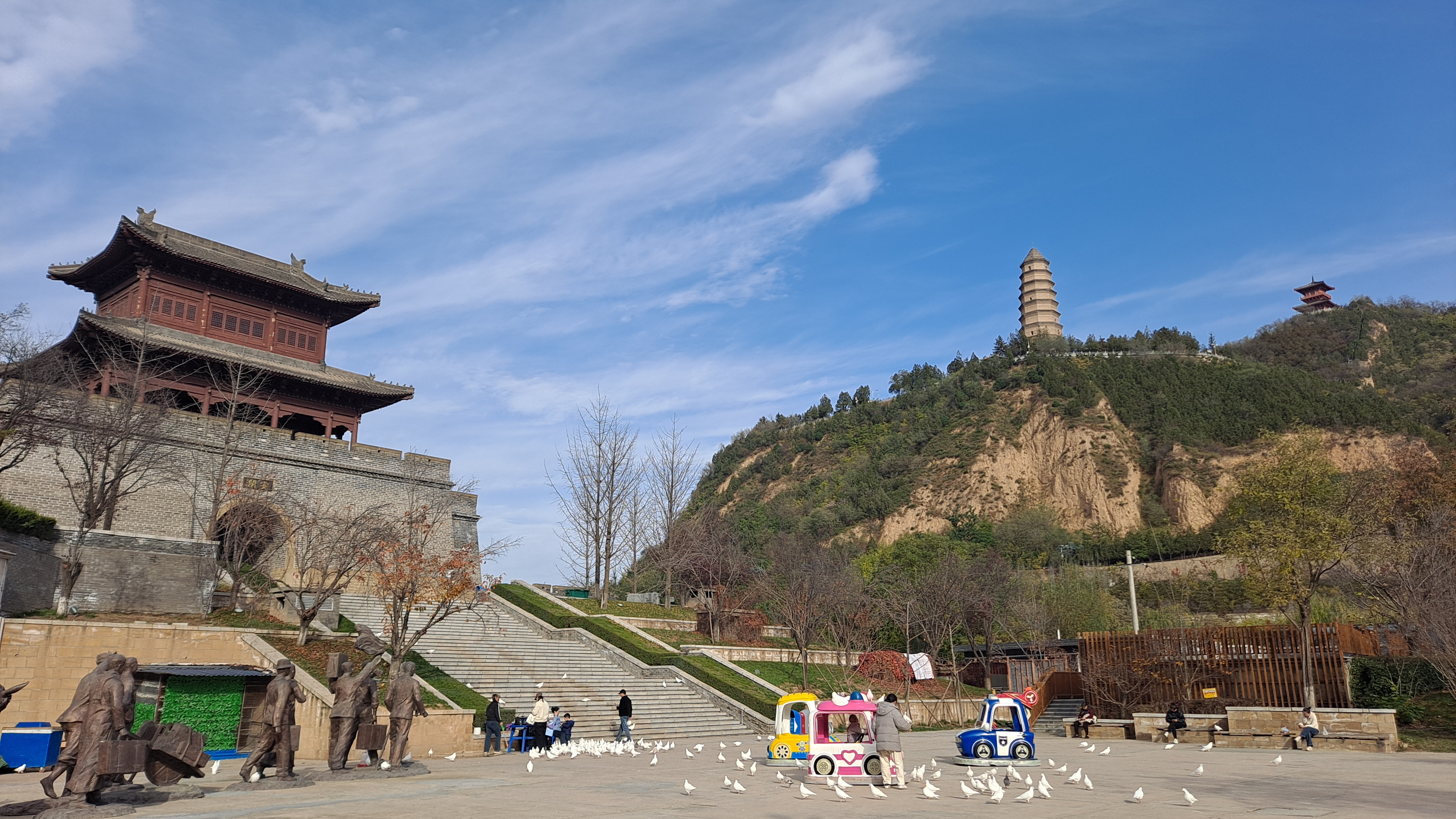
Anlan Gate (left) and Baota Mountain (right)

In May 1950, under the People's Republic of China, Yan'an was re-organized as Yan'an District (Chinese: 延安分区), and was further re-organized as a special district (Chinese: 专区) in October. Yan'an was later established as a prefecture (Chinese: 地区).

On November 15, 1996, Yan'an Area was revoked and established as a prefecture-level city. Yan'an's experienced fast-paced urbanization during the Eleventh Five-Year Plan period (2006–2010). From 2011 to 2015, it underwent a red tourism-oriented beautification project.

General Secretary of the Chinese Communist Party Xi Jinping visited Yan'an in 2015. During the visit, he emphasized the importance of studying the Communist Party's history in Yan'an and called for a renewed focus on the principles of Marxism–Leninism, Mao Zedong Thought, and the party's revolutionary tradition.

== Geography ==
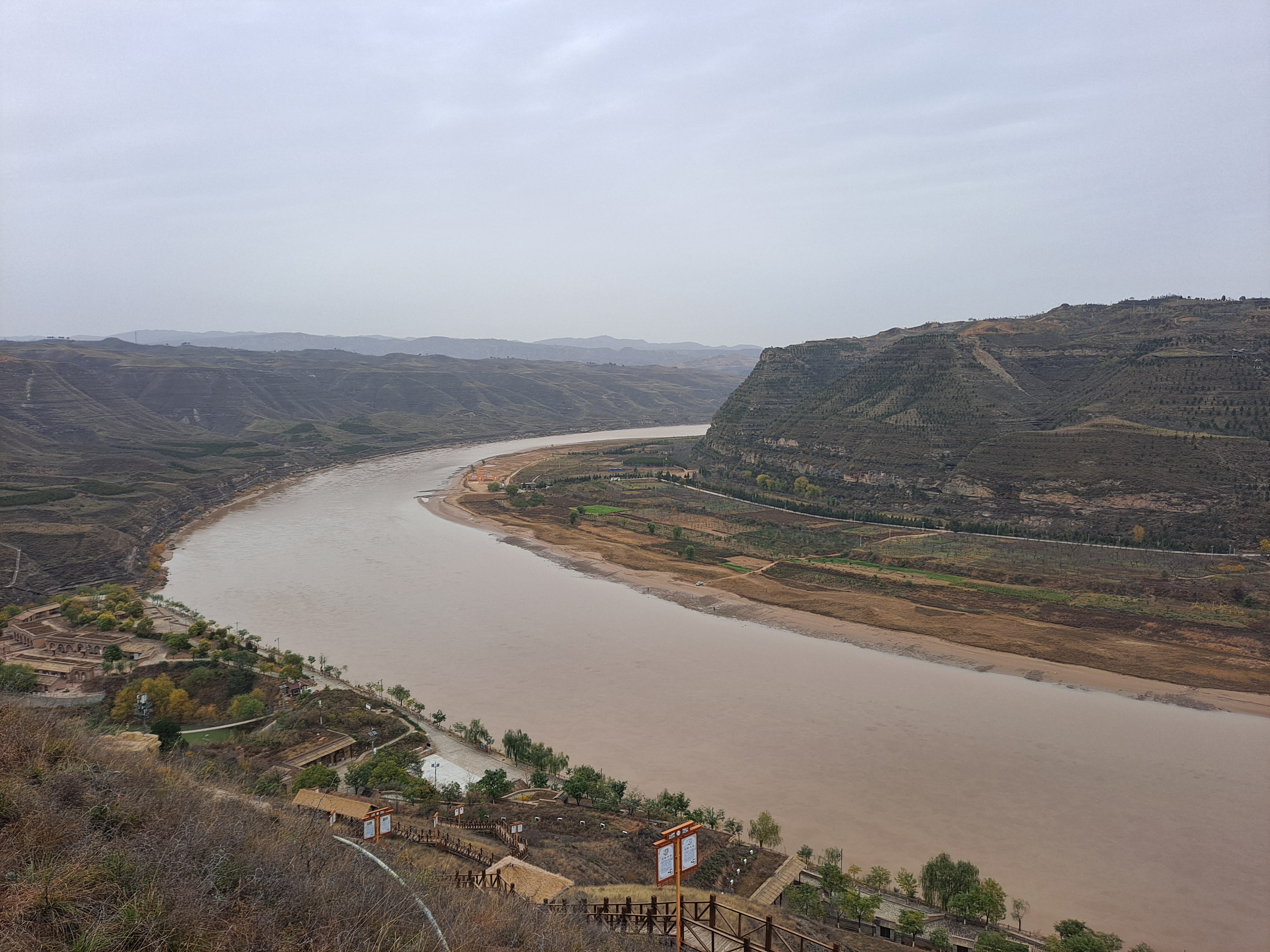
Qingshui Meander of Yellow River near Yan'an

Yan'an is located in northern Shaanxi on the Loess Plateau, with a latitude spanning from 35°21′ to 37°31′ N, and a longitude spanning from 107°41′ to 110°31′ E. The city is bordered by Yulin to the north, Xianyang, Tongchuan, and Weinan in the Guanzhong region to the south, Linfen and Lüliang of Shanxi to the east across the middle reaches of the Yellow River, and Qingyang of Gansu to the west across the Ziwu Ridge (Chinese: 子午岭). The city's elevation is hilly, and is higher in the northwest, and lower in the southeast, ranging from 388.8 to 1,809.8 metres (1,276 to 5,938 ft) above sea level in elevation. The average elevation of Yan'an is approximately 1,200 m (3,940 ft), and Yan'an's urban core has an elevation of about 960 metres (3,150 ft) above sea level. In addition to the Yellow River flowing through Yan'an, the city's major rivers include the Yan River and the Luo River.

=== Climate ===
Yan'an has a humid continental climate (Köppen climate classification Dwa) that borders on a steppe climate (Köppen BSk), with cold, dry, and moderately long winters, and hot, somewhat humid summers. Spring and autumn are short transition seasons in between. The monthly 24-hour average temperature ranges from −5.5 °C (22.1 °F) in January to 23.1 °C (73.6 °F) in July, and the annual mean is 9.90 °C (49.8 °F). The area receives 511 millimeters (20.1 in) of precipitation, 47% of which falls in July and August. Yan'an averages around 300 days of sunshine per year.

Climate data for Yan'an, elevation 959 m (3,146 ft), (1991–2020 normals, extremes 1951–present)
Month	Jan	Feb	Mar	Apr	May	Jun	Jul	Aug	Sep	Oct	Nov	Dec	Year
Record high °C (°F)	17.3 (63.1)	23.8 (74.8)	29.4 (84.9)	36.7 (98.1)	36.5 (97.7)	39.3 (102.7)	39.7 (103.5)	36.9 (98.4)	37.5 (99.5)	29.7 (85.5)	25.5 (77.9)	18.0 (64.4)	39.7 (103.5)
Mean daily maximum °C (°F)	2.3 (36.1)	7.3 (45.1)	13.3 (55.9)	21.1 (70.0)	25.8 (78.4)	29.7 (85.5)	30.5 (86.9)	28.4 (83.1)	23.7 (74.7)	18.1 (64.6)	11.1 (52.0)	4.3 (39.7)	18.0 (64.3)
Daily mean °C (°F)	−4.9 (23.2)	−0.2 (31.6)	5.8 (42.4)	13.1 (55.6)	18.2 (64.8)	22.3 (72.1)	24.0 (75.2)	22.2 (72.0)	17.0 (62.6)	10.5 (50.9)	3.4 (38.1)	−2.9 (26.8)	10.7 (51.3)
Mean daily minimum °C (°F)	−10.3 (13.5)	−5.8 (21.6)	−0.1 (31.8)	6.3 (43.3)	11.3 (52.3)	15.7 (60.3)	18.8 (65.8)	17.5 (63.5)	12.3 (54.1)	5.2 (41.4)	−1.8 (28.8)	−7.8 (18.0)	5.1 (41.2)
Record low °C (°F)	−25.4 (−13.7)	−20.8 (−5.4)	−18.4 (−1.1)	−8.8 (16.2)	−3.4 (25.9)	4.8 (40.6)	8.8 (47.8)	5.3 (41.5)	−3.0 (26.6)	−8.5 (16.7)	−17.0 (1.4)	−24.1 (−11.4)	−25.4 (−13.7)
Average precipitation mm (inches)	3.2 (0.13)	5.3 (0.21)	14.6 (0.57)	25.6 (1.01)	41.0 (1.61)	64.1 (2.52)	100.6 (3.96)	110.0 (4.33)	69.1 (2.72)	38.4 (1.51)	14.7 (0.58)	2.4 (0.09)	489 (19.24)
Average precipitation days (≥ 0.1 mm)	2.4	3.0	4.6	5.9	7.8	9.0	12.0	11.1	9.8	8.1	3.9	2.0	79.6
Average snowy days	4.3	4.0	2.9	0.5	0	0	0	0	0	0.3	2.4	3.6	18
Average relative humidity (%)	54	51	49	44	49	56	67	72	72	68	60	54	58
Mean monthly sunshine hours	196.5	188.2	218.8	242.5	262.6	251.6	231.0	213.7	176.0	190.8	191.3	192.3	2,555.3
Percentage possible sunshine	63	61	59	61	60	57	52	52	48	55	63	64	58
Source 1: China Meteorological Administration extremes
Source 2: Weather China

=== Pollution ===
Yan'an experiences moderate to severe air pollution year‐round. Its basin‐like terrain combined with frequent winter temperature inversions traps locally emitted pollutants, while heavy reliance on coal for industry and residential heating, growing vehicle use, and seasonal dust storms from surrounding arid regions together maintain high concentrations of particulate matter (PM_{2.5} and PM_{10}) and gaseous contaminants such as sulfur dioxide (SO_{2}) and NOx gases. Elevated PM_{2.5} levels are linked to respiratory and cardiovascular diseases, while acid deposition from SO_{2} and NOx damages soils and vegetation across the fragile loess landscape.

Yan'an sits atop the highly erodible Loess Plateau, where thick wind‐deposited silt forms uneven terrain that impedes horizontal dispersion of air pollutants. On the eastern edge of the plateau, a persistent "warm cover" of anomalously warm air and downdrafts suppresses vertical mixing, creating a convergence line that carries and concentrates emissions along the slopes—a phenomenon that amplifies pollution levels by 50–150% compared to flatter regions. During winter months, strong temperature inversions—layers of warmer air aloft capping colder surface air—further inhibit the vertical dilution of pollutants, leading to seasonal peaks in PM_{2.5} concentrations and prolonged haze events.

==== Sources of pollution ====
Coal mining, coal‐fired power generation and cement production dominate Yan'an's industrial sector, collectively releasing large volumes of SO_{2}, NOx gases, and coarse (PM_{10}) and fine (PM_{2.5}) particulate matter. Inefficient combustion and fugitive dust from these facilities are key contributors to the city's annual pollution burden.

In winter, over 80% of households in northern China, which includes Yan'an and its surroundings, rely on coal combustion for space heating. Traditional stoves and boilers emit high levels of black carbon and PM_{2.5}, driving sharp increases in airborne particulates during colder months.

Road vehicles in Yan'an contribute significant quantities of nitrogen oxides, volatile organic compounds and fine particulates. Regional tracking studies identify Yulin and Yan'an as important sources for wintertime NOx and PM transport within the Fen‐Wei River Valley, indicating that urban traffic emissions exacerbate local air quality problems.

Seasonal dust storms originating in the Mu Us Desert and adjacent arid zones inject pulses of PM_{10} into Yan'an's atmosphere. Natural dust events can elevate particulate concentrations several‐fold within hours, compounding anthropogenic pollution and sustaining prolonged haze episodes.

== Administrative divisions ==
Map
Name	Hanzi	Hanyu Pinyin	Population (2019)	Area (km^{2})	Density (/km^{2})
Baota District	宝塔区	Bǎotǎ Qū	497,100	3,537.6	140.52
Ansai District	安塞区	Ānsài Qū	177,600	2,951.3	60.18
Zichang City	子长市	Zǐcháng Shì	219,400	2,393.4	91.67
Yanchang County	延长县	Yáncháng Xiàn	127,900	2,361.6	54.16
Yanchuan County	延川县	Yánchuān Xiàn	170,100	1,986.5	85.63
Zhidan County	志丹县	Zhìdān Xiàn	145,800	3,790.2	38.47
Wuqi County	吴起县	Wúqǐ Xiàn	152,600	3,788.5	40.28
Ganquan County	甘泉县	Gānquán Xiàn	79,100	2,276.1	34.75
Fu County	富县	Fù Xiàn	156,800	4,179.9	37.51
Luochuan County	洛川县	Luòchuān Xiàn	228,200	1,791.3	127.39
Yichuan County	宜川县	Yíchuān Xiàn	121,500	2,937.2	41.37
Huanglong County	黄龙县	Huánglóng Xiàn	49,200	2,751.0	17.88
Huangling County	黄陵县	Huánglíng Xiàn	130,400	2,286.7	57.03

== Demographics ==
As of 2019, Yan'an has approximately 2,255,700 permanent residents, a slight decrease from the 2,259,400 recorded in 2018. As of 2019, there are 2,336,587 people with a Yan'an hukou registration. This discrepancy reflects China's system of internal migration, as many hukou holders in more rural areas migrate to larger and more developed cities.

Approximately 674,700 people lived in Yan'an's two districts (Baota and Ansai) as of 2019.

=== Vital statistics ===
In 2019, Yan'an recorded a birth rate of 9.80‰ (per thousand), and a death rate of 5.97‰, giving the city a rate of natural increase of 3.83‰. This is a slight decrease from 2018, when the rate of natural increase was 4.30‰.

=== Ethnic groups ===
Nearly all of Yan'an's population is ethnically Han Chinese. There are 6,000 people in Yan'an who belong to 34 different ethnic minority groups, of which, the majority are Hui.

=== Language ===
Three Chinese linguistic varieties are widely spoken in Yan'an: the Shaanbei dialect of Jin Chinese, the Qin-Long dialect of Central Plains Mandarin, and the Guanzhong dialect of Central Plains Mandarin. Within the Shaanbei dialect, the Zhi-Yan dialect is spoken throughout much of Yan'an.

=== Income ===
In 2019, urban households earned an average disposable income of 34,888 RMB, an 8.3% increase from the previous year. Rural households earned a lower average of 11,876 RMB, reflecting a 10.1% increase from the previous year.

== Economy ==
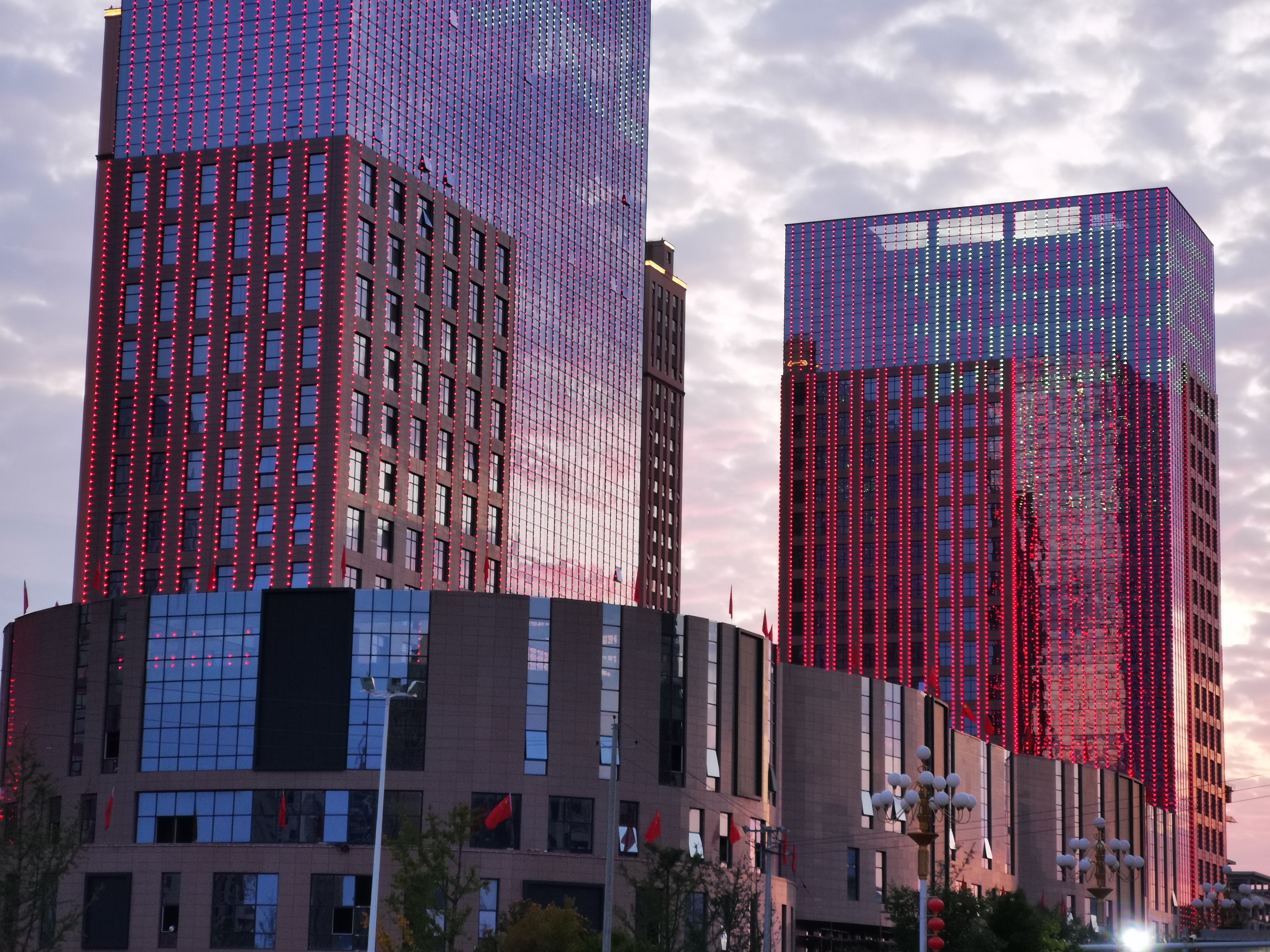
Buildings in Baota District

Like much of China, Yan'an's economy has rapidly developed in the 21st century. Yan'an's gross domestic product (GDP) in 2019 stood at 166.389 billion RMB, more than ten times its GDP in 2000, which stood at just 13.063 billion RMB. Yan'an recorded a 6.7% increase to GDP in 2019, down from the 8.9% growth recorded in 2018, and below the peak of 19.6% annual GDP growth the city achieved in 2004. The GDP per capita of Yan'an totals 73,703 RMB as of 2019, a 6.9% increase from the previous year. Of Yan'an's county-level divisions, Baota District recorded the largest GDP in 2019, totaling 36.391 billion RMB. Baota District is followed by Luochuan County and Huangling County, which recorded economic outputs totaling 24.387 billion and 18.593 billion RMB, respectively. Yan'an is largely reliant on its secondary sector, which comprises the majority of its GDP as of 2019.

GDP Composition of Yan'an (2019)
Sector	2019 Value (RMB)	Percent of Total GDP	Annual growth
Primary Sector	14.933 billion	8.975%	+5.2%
Secondary Sector	99.985 billion	60.091%	+6.5%
Tertiary Sector	51.471 billion	30.934%	+7.6%
Total GDP	166.389 billion	100.000%	+6.7%

=== Agriculture ===
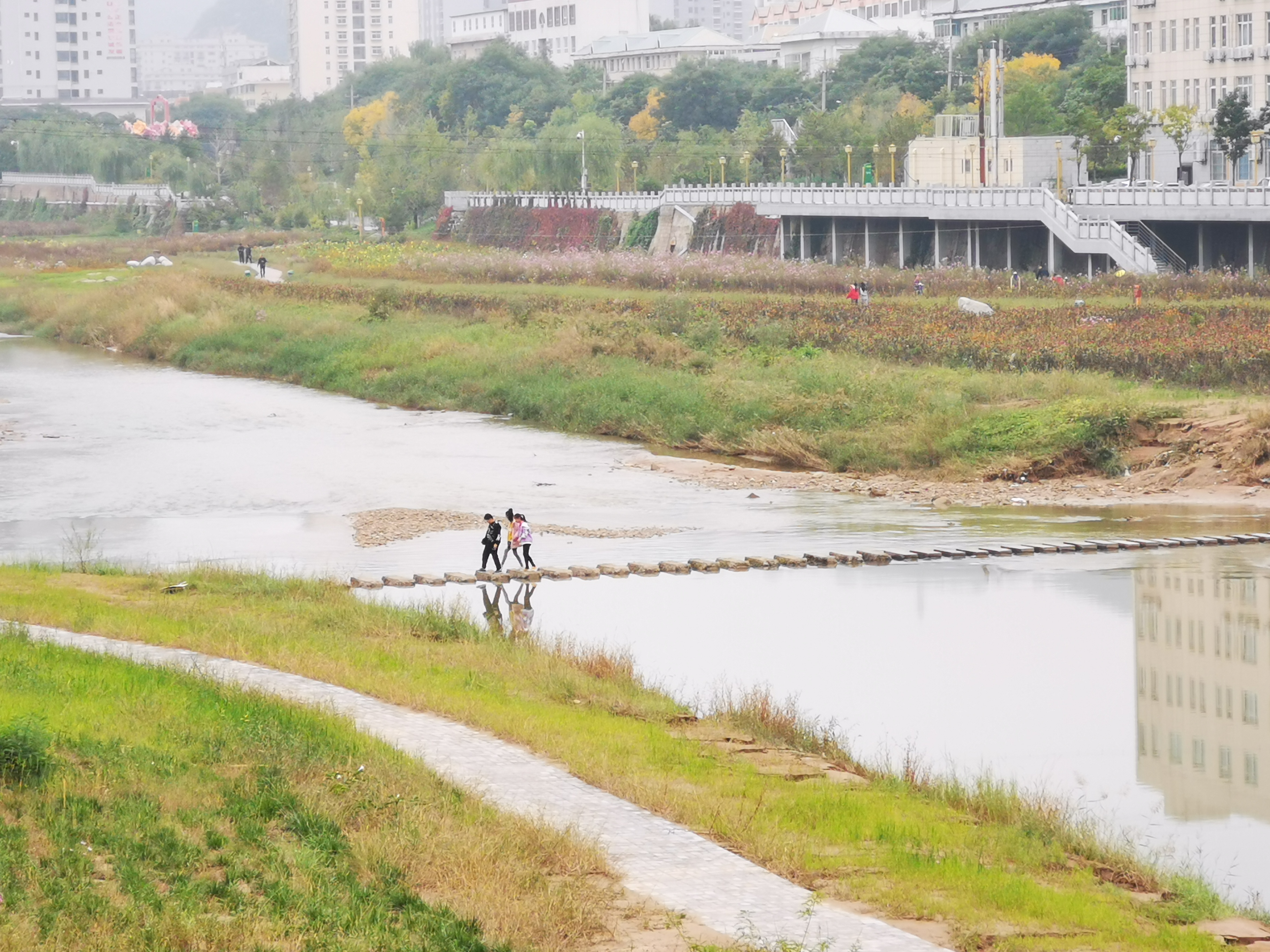
The Yan River in Baota District

As of 2019, the city's output in the fields of agriculture, forestry, animal husbandry, and fishing totals 26.107 billion RMB. Of this, farming accounted for 21.798 billion RMB, animal husbandry accounted for 2.987 billion RMB, forestry accounted for 621.17 million RMB, fishing accounted for 72.82 million RMB, and agricultural services accounted for 628.32 million RMB.

The total area of Yan'an's farmland in 2019 is 183.30 thousand hectares, of which, 72.79 thousand hectares are used for growing maize. Sizable tracts of land in Yan'an are also used to grow vegetables and soybeans. Yan'an has the second largest cotton production out of all the prefecture-level cities in Shaanxi, behind just Weinan. The city also grows a large amount of rapeseeds, peanuts, apples, jujubes, and apricots. Yan'an is also the second largest honey producer in Shaanxi, behind Hanzhong.

=== Industry ===
As of 2019, the city's industrial output is worth 96.510 billion RMB, a 6.4% increase from the previous year at constant prices. In 2018, the petroleum industry alone accounted for 54.419 billion RMB of output. In addition to oil and natural gas, major industries in the city include coal mining, power generation, and cigarette production.

==== Petroleum industry ====
Yan'an is a major oil and gas center in China. In 2018, 15,292,400 tons of crude oil were extracted from the city. Of this, 8,565,800 tons were extracted by Yanchang Petroleum, and the remaining 6,726,600 tons were extracted as part of CNPC's Changqing Oil Field. The Changqing Oil Field, part of the wider Ordos basin, one of China's main petroleum-producing regions, has been home to oil extraction since the early 1970s.

=== Retail ===
The total retail sales of consumer goods in Yan'an totaled 41.113 billion RMB in 2019. The majority of these retail sales took place in Baota District, which recorded 24.000 billion RMB of sales that year.

== Culture ==
Yan'an's culture is more broadly part of the Shaanbei culture that exists throughout northern Shaanxi. The area has unique traditional music, which often incorporates the use of waist drums, most notably those from Ansai District. The area also unique traditional paper cutting crafts. Yaodong, cave dwellings indigenous to the Loess Plateau, are also indigenous to the wider northern Shaanxi region.

The Erdao Street Night Market (Chinese: 二道街夜市; pinyin: Èrdào Jiē Yèshì) is a street market in Baota District which features many of the hallmarks of Shaanbei culture, including local cuisine, décor, and folk music.

== Tourism ==
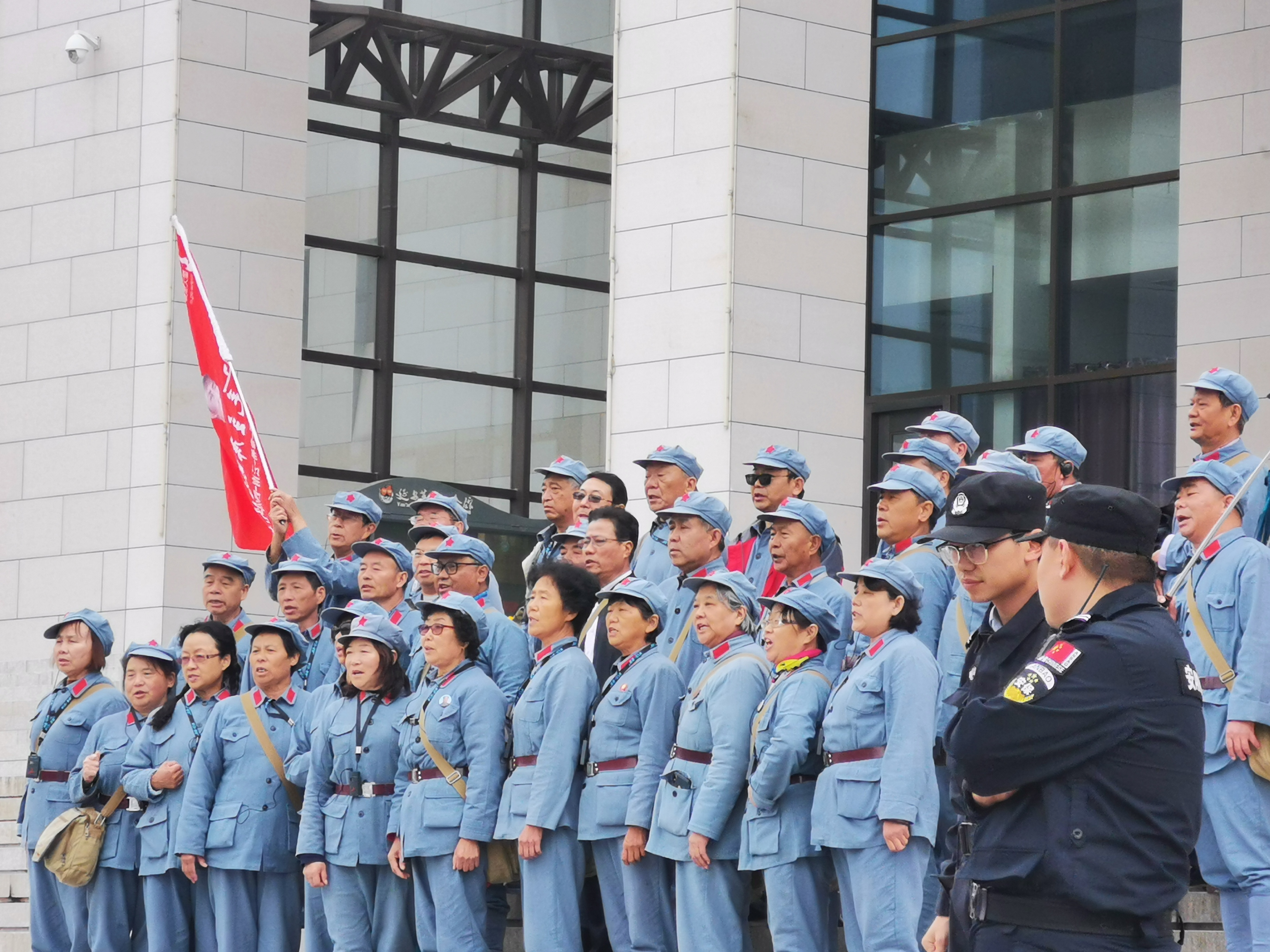
A scene at the Yan'an Revolutionary Memorial Hall

The city is a major center for red tourism in China, with facilities such as the Yan'an Revolution Memorial Hall attracting Chinese citizens and Communist Party cadres seeking to learn more about the Party's history. Red tourism to Yan'an significantly increased in the years following CCP General Secretary Xi Jinping's 2015 visit, with 40.25 million tourist visits in 2016 and 73.08 million tourist visits in 2019.

In 2021, the development project Golden Yan'an opened as part of the Holy Land Valley Cultural Tourism Industrial Park. This tourist town is branded as the "new landmark of Red Tourism in China" and features old-fashioned Chinese streets and shops in the style of the 1930s Yan'an Soviet. The major attraction of Golden Yan'an is "The Ode of Yan'an" nightlight show. The free show depicts a series of historical moments from the Communist Party's Yan'an period presented with a light show on the mountains and an audio-visual projection on Baota Mountain.Yan'an Red Street uses red culture-themed stories to connect the soul of the entire neighborhood. In addition, unlike other tourist attractions, Yan'an Red Street has created many innovative interactive experiential projects, allowing tourists to experience a Red Street journey that integrates body and soul.

Shortly before the centenary of the Chinese Communist Party, Yan'an launched the "Red Stars Flying Me to Yan'an from Thirteen Cities" imitative, which sought to promote tourism to Yan'an for the study of revolutionary history, including with drastically reduced airfare.

== Transportation ==
- Yan'an Nanniwan Airport
- G2211 Changyan Expressway
- G65 Baotou–Maoming Expressway
- China National Highway 210

== Education ==
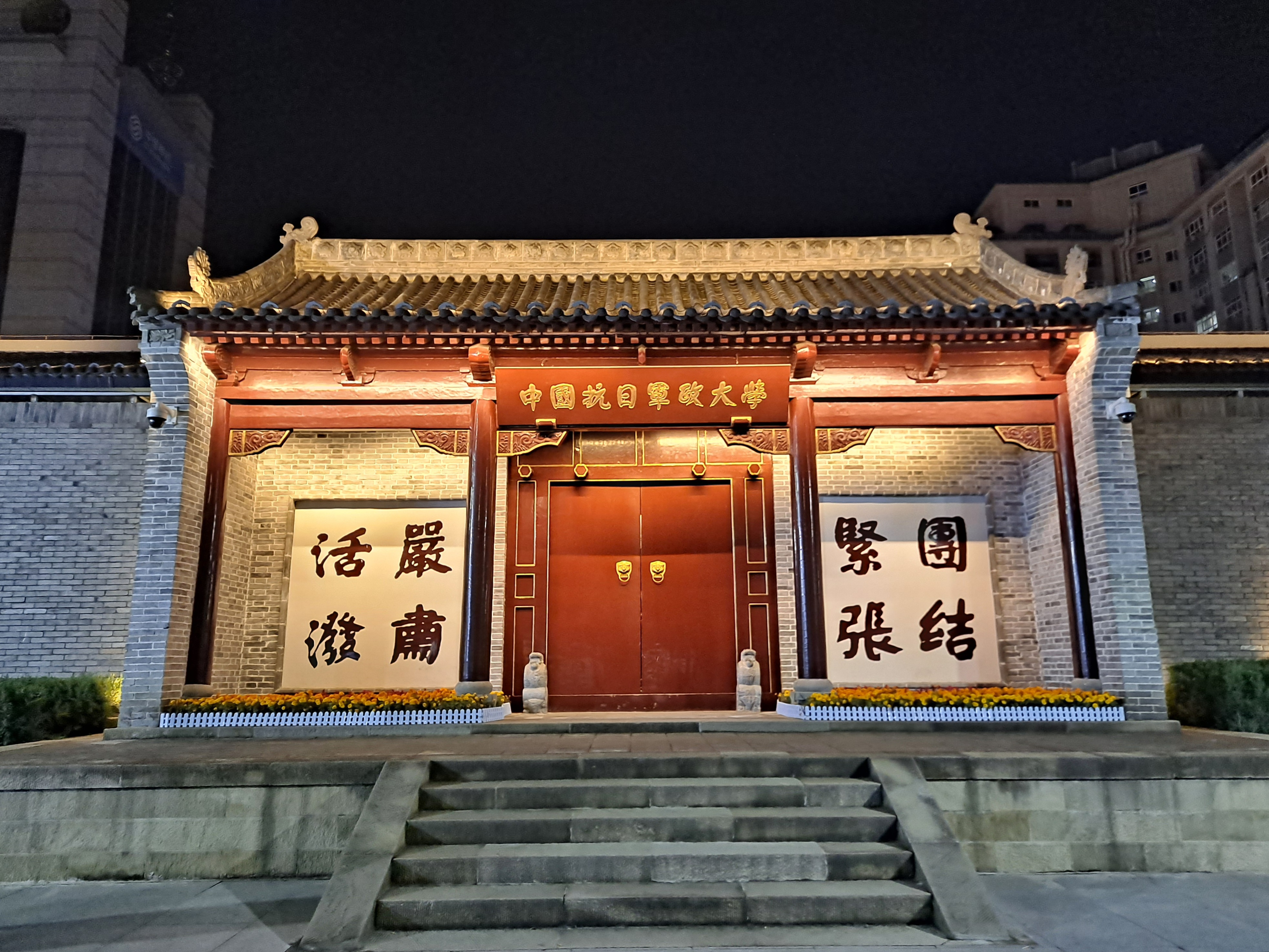
Site of Counter-Japanese Military and Political University

Yan'an is home to 251 standard primary schools and 112 standard secondary schools, enrolling 218,100 and 129,900 students, respectively. The city also has 556 kindergartens, enrolling 119,500 students. The city also has 5 special education schools, serving 372 disabled students. As of 2019, Yan'an has 13 public libraries.

=== Notable educational institutions ===
- Yan'an University
- China Yan'an Executive Leadership Academy
- Yan'an Middle School

== Healthcare ==
Yan'an is home to 2,631 healthcare institutions as of 2019, which contain 14,560 medical beds, and are staffed by 24,298 employees.

== See also ==
- Yan'an Rectification Movement
- Yan'an Talks on Literature and Art
- 2693 Yan'an
