= Luo River (Shaanxi) =

River in Shaanxi, China

Coordinates: 34°38′33″N 110°10′19″E

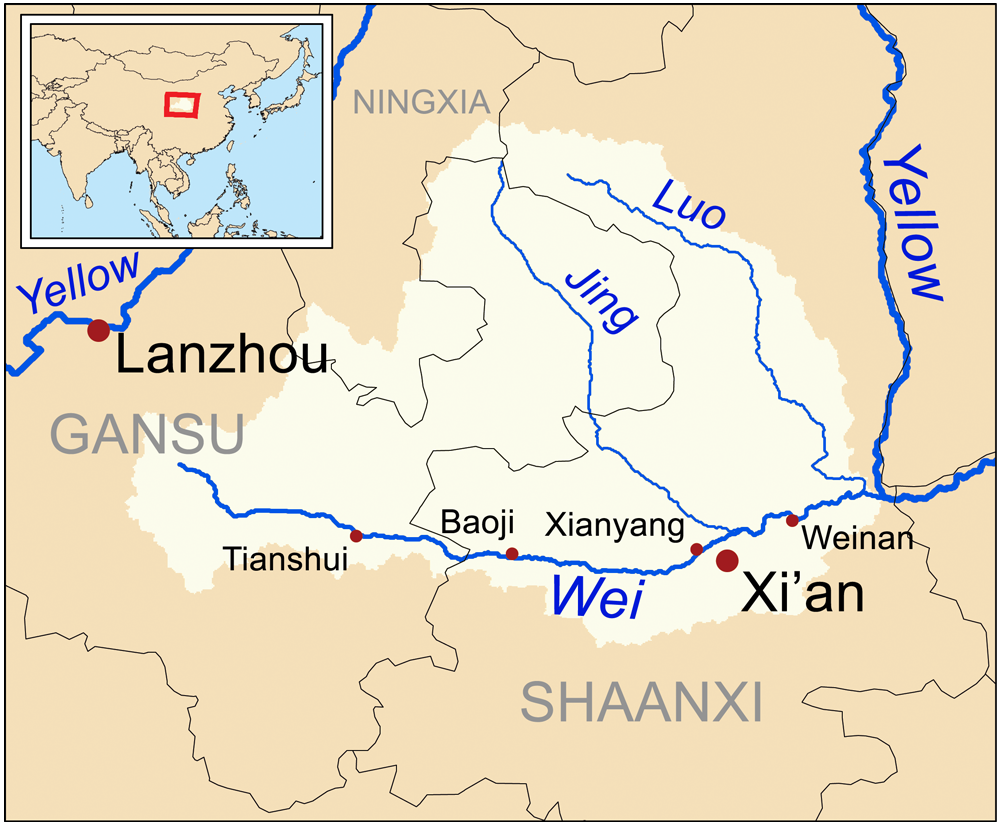
- Chinese: 洛河
Transcriptions
Standard Mandarin
- Hanyu Pinyin: Luòhé
- Wade–Giles: Luo He

Luo River, also known by its Chinese name as the Luo He, is a tributary of the Wei River. It flows through the Loess Plateau and has a length of about 680 kilometers (420 mi).

== History ==
The area between the Luo and the Yellow River was known in ancient China as Hexi (河西, "[Lands] West of the River"). Its ownership was notably contested between Qin and Wei.
