= Paifang Hui and Manchu Ethnic Township =

Paifang Hui and Manchu Ethnic Township (Chinese: 牌坊回族满族乡) is an ethnic township in Feidong County, Hefei, Anhui, China. Paifang was established in 1994, and is the only ethnic township in Hefei and the only multi-ethnic township in Anhui.

Paifang Hui and Manchu Ethnic Township is divided into:

- Paifang Ethnic Community
- Gaotang Community
- Caomiao Community
- Xinfeng Community
- Zhaofang Community
- Xujing Community
- Zhanggang Village
- Jianmiao Village
- Xingmiao Village
- Sanwang Village
- Xingyi Village
- Minxin Village
- Shuguang Village

Paifang is adjacent to Lukou Township to the east and Dianbu Township, the county seat to the south. It is connected to Zhongxing Township and borders Caomiao Township and Liangyuan Township in the north.
