= Ethnic townships, towns, and sums =

Township-level subdivisions of China

Ethnic township

Chinese name
- Simplified Chinese: 民族乡
- Traditional Chinese: 民族鄉
Transcriptions
Standard Mandarin
- Hanyu Pinyin: mínzú xiāng
- Bopomofo: ㄇㄧㄣˊ ㄗㄨˊ ㄒㄧㄤ
- Gwoyeu Romatzyh: mintzwu shiang
- Wade–Giles: min^{2}-tsu^{2} hsiang^{1}
- Yale Romanization: míndzú syāng
- IPA: [mǐn.tsǔ.ɕjáŋ]

Ethnic town
- Simplified Chinese: 民族镇
- Traditional Chinese: 民族鎮
Transcriptions
Standard Mandarin
- Hanyu Pinyin: mínzú zhèn
- Bopomofo: ㄇㄧㄣˊ ㄗㄨˊ ㄓㄣˋ
- Gwoyeu Romatzyh: mintzwu jenn
- Wade–Giles: min^{2}-tsu^{2} chên^{4}
- Yale Romanization: míndzú jèn
- IPA: [mǐn.tsǔ.ʈʂə̂n]

Ethnic sum
- Simplified Chinese: 民族苏木
- Traditional Chinese: 民族蘇木
Transcriptions
Standard Mandarin
- Hanyu Pinyin: mínzú sūmù
- Bopomofo: ㄇㄧㄣˊ ㄗㄨˊ ㄙㄨ ㄇㄨˋ
- Gwoyeu Romatzyh: mintzwu sumuh
- Wade–Giles: min^{2}-tsu^{2} su^{1}-mu^{4}
- Yale Romanization: míndzú sūmù
- IPA: [mǐn.tsǔ sú.mû]

Zhuang name
- Zhuang: minzcuz yangh minzcuz cinq

Korean name
- Chosŏn'gŭl: 민족향
- Hancha: 民族鄕
Transcriptions
- Revised Romanization: minjok hyang
- McCune–Reischauer: minjok hyang

Mongolian name
- Mongolian Cyrillic: үндэстэний шиян
- Mongolian script: ᠦᠨᠳᠦᠰᠦᠲᠡᠨ ᠦ ᠰᠢᠶᠠᠩ
Transcriptions
- SASM/GNC: ündüsüten-ü siyaŋ

Uyghur name
- Uyghur: مىللىي يېزا
Transcriptions
- Latin Yëziqi: milliy yëza

Manchu name
- Manchu script: ᡠᡴᠰᡠᡵᠠ ᡤᠠᡧᠠᠨ
- Möllendorff: uksura gašan

Kazakh name
- Kazakh: ۇلتتىق اۋىل; Ұлттық ауыл Ūlttyq auyl

Kyrgyz name
- Kyrgyz: ۇلۇتتۇق ايىل; Улуттук айыл Uluttuq ajyl

Daur name
- Daur: aimn tors

Ethnic townships (officially translated as nationality townships), ethnic towns, and ethnic sums are fourth-level administrative units designated for ethnic minorities of political divisions in the People's Republic of China. They are not considered to be autonomous and do not enjoy the laws pertaining to the larger ethnic autonomous areas such as autonomous regions, autonomous prefectures, autonomous counties, and autonomous banners. However, what defines an ethnic township is that the law requires that its head of government be a member of the titular ethnic minority.

The only ethnic sum is the Evenk Ethnic Sum in Old Barag Banner, Inner Mongolia.

== Numbers of ethnic townships, towns, and sums ==
Year	Quantity of ethnic townships, towns, and sums
1986	2936
1988	1571
1990	1980
1997	1545
2000	1356
2001	1165
2002	1160
2003	1147
2004	1126
2010	1098
2013	1035
2021	959

== List of ethnic townships and ethnic towns ==
=== Anhui ===
- Paifang Hui and Manchu Ethnic Township (牌坊回族满族乡)
- Saijian Hui Ethnic Township (赛涧回族乡)
- Gugou Hui Ethnic Township (古沟回族乡)
- Gudui Hui Ethnic Township (孤堆回族乡)
- Lichong Hui Ethnic Township (李冲回族乡)
- Taodian Hui Ethnic Township (陶店回族乡)

=== Beijing ===
- Changying Hui Ethnic Township (常营回族乡)
- Changshaoying Manchu Ethnic Township (长哨营满族乡)
- Labagoumen Manchu Ethnic Township (喇叭沟门满族乡)
- Tanying Manchu and Mongol Ethnic Township (檀营满族蒙古族乡)
- Yujiawu Hui Ethnic Township (于家务回族乡)

=== Chongqing ===
- Debao Tujia Ethnic Township (地宝土家族乡)
- Henghe Tujia Ethnic Township (恒合土家族乡)
- Mozi Tujia Ethnic Township (磨子土家族乡)
- Shiqiao Miao and Tujia Ethnic Township (石桥苗族土家族乡)
- Wenfu Miao and Tujia Ethnic Township (文复苗族土家族乡)
- Houping Miao and Tujia Ethnic Township (后坪苗族土家族乡)
- Haokou Miao and Gelao Township (浩口苗族仡佬族乡)
- Taihe Tujia Ethnic Township (太和土家族乡)
- Chang'an Tujia Ethnic Township (长安土家族乡)
- Longqiao Tujia Ethnic Township (龙桥土家族乡)
- Yunwu Tujia Ethnic Township (云雾土家族乡)
- Qingshui Tujia Ethnic Township (清水土家族乡)

=== Fujian ===
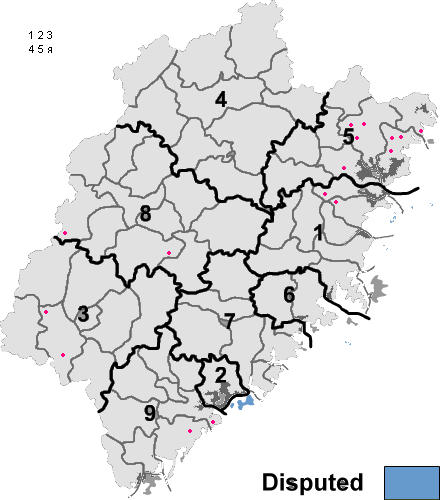
She ethnic townships in Fujian

- Xiaocang She Ethnic Township (小沧畲族乡)
- Huokou She Ethnic Township (霍口畲族乡)
- Guanzhuang She Ethnic Township (官庄畲族乡)
- Lufeng She Ethnic Township (庐丰畲族乡)
- Jinhan She Ethnic Township (金涵畲族乡)
- Banzhong She Ethnic Township Township (坂中畲族乡)
- Muyun She Ethnic Township Township (穆云畲族乡)
- Kangcuo She Ethnic Township Township (康厝畲族乡)
- Xiamen She Ethnic Township (硖门畲族乡)
- Jiayang She Ethnic Township (佳阳畲族乡)
- Shuimen She Ethnic Township (水门畲族乡)
- Chongru She Ethnic Township (崇儒畲族乡)
- Yantian She Ethnic Township (盐田畲族乡)
- Baiqi Hui Ethnic Township (百崎回族乡)
- Qingshui She Ethnic Township (青水畲族乡)
- Zhiping She Ethnic Township (治平畲族乡)
- Longjiao She Ethnic Township (隆教畲族乡)
- Huxi She Ethnic Township (湖西畲族乡)
- Chiling She Ethnic Township (赤岭畲族乡)

=== Guangdong ===
- Zhangxi She Ethnic Township (漳溪畲族乡)
- Lantian Yao Ethnic Township (蓝天瑶族乡)
- Yao'an Yao Ethnic Township (瑶安瑶族乡)
- Sanshui Yao Ethnic Township (三水瑶族乡)
- Chengjia Yao Ethnic Township (秤架瑶族乡)
- Shendushui Yao Ethnic Township (深渡水瑶族乡)
- Shuai Zhuang and Yao Ethnic Township (帅壮族瑶族乡)

=== Guangxi ===
- Guzhai Yao Ethnic Township (古寨瑶族乡)
- Jiafang Yao Ethnic Township (加方瑶族乡)
- Zhenwei Yao Ethnic Township (镇圩瑶族乡)
- Wangdian Yao Ethnic Township (汪甸瑶族乡)
- Lingzhan Yao Ethnic Township (伶站瑶族乡)
- Chaoli Yao Ethnic Township (朝里瑶族乡)
- Shali Yao Ethnic Township (沙里瑶族乡)
- Yuhong Yao Ethnic Township (玉洪瑶族乡)
- Zuodeng Yao Ethnic Township (作登瑶族乡)
- Lucheng Yao Ethnic Township (潞城瑶族乡)
- Lizhou Yao Ethnic Township (利周瑶族乡)
- Bagui Yao Ethnic Township (八桂瑶族乡)
- Badu Yao Ethnic Township (八渡瑶族乡)
- Nazuo Miao Ethnic Township (那佐苗族乡)
- Puhe Miao Ethnic Township (普合苗族乡)
- Zubie Yao and Miao Ethnic Township (足别瑶族苗族乡)
- Nanping Yao Ethnic Township (南屏瑶族乡)
- Guo'an Yao Ethnic Township (国安瑶族乡)
- Malian Yao Ethnic Township (马练瑶族乡)
- Caoping Hui Ethnic Township (草坪回族乡)
- Wantian Yao Ethnic Township (宛田瑶族乡)
- Huangsha Yao Ethnic Township (黄沙瑶族乡)
- Pulu Yao Ethnic Township (蒲芦瑶族乡)
- Jiaojiang Yao Ethnic Township (蕉江瑶族乡)
- Dongshan Yao Ethnic Township (东山瑶族乡)
- Huajiang Yao Ethnic Township (华江瑶族乡)
- Fulong Yao Ethnic Township (福龙瑶族乡)
- Beiya Yao Ethnic Township (北牙瑶族乡)
- Sannong Yao Ethnic Township (三弄瑶族乡)
- Jinya Yao Ethnic Township (金牙瑶族乡)
- Pingle Yao Ethnic Township (平乐瑶族乡)
- Jiangzhou Yao Ethnic Township (江洲瑶族乡)
- Xunle Miao Ethnic Township (驯乐苗族乡)
- Zhongbao Miao Ethnic Township (中堡苗族乡)
- Bawei Yao Ethnic Township (八圩瑶族乡)
- Lihu Yao Ethnic Township (里湖瑶族乡)
- Bala Yao Ethnic Township (八腊瑶族乡)
- Huangdong Yao Ethnic Township (黄洞瑶族乡)
- Daping Yao Ethnic Township (大平瑶族乡)
- Xianhui Yao Ethnic Township (仙回瑶族乡)
- Huashan Yao Ethnic Township (花山瑶族乡)
- Liang'an Yao Ethnic Township (两安瑶族乡)
- Guzhai Mulao Ethnic Township (古砦仫佬族乡)
- Tonglian Yao Ethnic Township (同练瑶族乡)
- Gunbei Dong Ethnic Township (滚贝侗族乡)
- Tongle Miao Ethnic Township (同乐苗族乡)
- Fulu Miao Ethnic Township (富禄苗族乡)
- Gaoji Yao Ethnic Township (高基瑶族乡)
- Changping Yao Ethnic Township (长坪瑶族乡)
- Xiayi Yao Ethnic Township (夏宜瑶族乡)

=== Guizhou ===
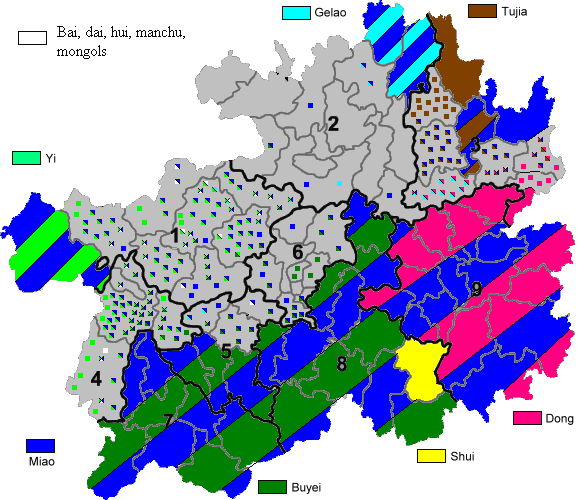
Major Autonomous areas within Guizhou. (excluding Hui)

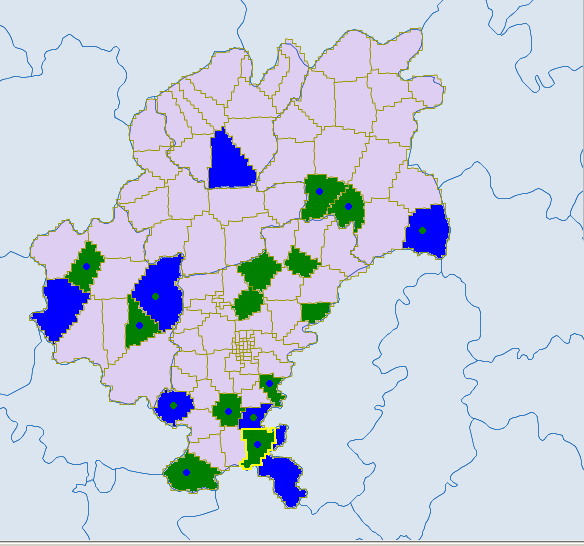
Blue - miao. Dark green- Bouyei

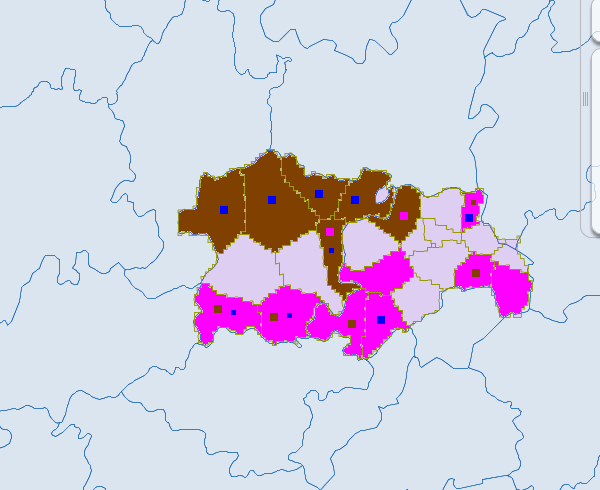
Blue - miao. Brown- tujia. red - dong

=== Hainan ===
- none

=== Hebei ===
- Jiumen Hui Ethnic Township (九门回族乡)
- Pengjiazhuang Hui Ethnic Township (彭家庄回族乡)
- Gaotou Hui Ethnic Township (高头回族乡)
- Haotouzhuang Hui Ethnic Township (号头庄回族乡)
- Loucun Manchu Ethnic Township (娄村满族乡)
- Lingyunce Hui and Manchu Ethnic Township (凌云册回族满族乡)
- Yang'erzhuang Hui Ethnic Township (羊二庄回族乡)
- Xincun Hui Ethnic Township (新村回族乡)
- Yangsanmu Hui Ethnic Township (羊三木回族乡)
- Jiedi Hui Ethnic Township (捷地回族乡)
- Dulin Hui Ethnic Township (杜林回族乡)
- Litianmu Hui Ethnic Township (李天木回族乡)
- Dazhecun Hui Ethnic Township (大褚村回族乡)
- Benzhai Hui Ethnic Township (本斋回族乡)
- Xidi Manchu Ethnic Township (西地满族乡)
- Gangzi Manchu Ethnic Township (岗子满族乡)
- Liangjia Manchu Ethnic Township (两家满族乡)
- Yinjiaying Manchu Ethnic Township (尹家营满族乡)
- Miaozigou Mongol and Manchu Ethnic Township (庙子沟蒙古族满族乡)
- Pianpoying Manchu Ethnic Township (偏坡营满族乡)
- Badaying Mongol Ethnic Township (八达营蒙古族乡)
- Taipingzhuang Manchu Ethnic Township (太平庄满族乡)
- Jiutun Manchu Ethnic Township (旧屯满族乡)
- Xi'achao Manchu and Mongol Ethnic Township (西阿超满族蒙古族乡)
- Baihugou Manchu and Mongol Ethnic Township (白虎沟满族蒙古族乡)
- Pingfang Manchu Ethnic Township (平坊满族乡)
- Anchungoumen Manchu Ethnic Township (安纯沟门满族乡)
- Xiaoying Manchu Ethnic Township (小营满族乡)
- Xigou Manchu Ethnic Township (西沟满族乡)
- Dengchang Manchu Ethnic Township (邓厂满族乡)
- Wudaoyingzi Manchu Ethnic Township (五道营子满族乡)
- Mayingzi Ethnic Township (马营子满族乡)
- Fujiadian Manchu Ethnic Township (付家店满族乡)
- Datun Manchu Ethnic Township (大屯满族乡)
- Liuxi Manchu Ethnic Township (柳溪满族乡)
- Qijiadai Manchu Ethnic Township (七家岱满族乡)
- Pingfang Manchu and Mongol Ethnic Township (平房满族蒙古族乡)
- Maolangou Manchu and Mongol Ethnic Township (茅兰沟满族蒙古族乡)
- Guozhangzi Manchu Ethnic Township (郭杖子满族乡)
- Nantian Manchu Ethnic Township (南天门满族乡)
- Bagualing Manchu Ethnic Township (八卦岭满族乡)
- Yingzhen Hui Ethnic Township (营镇回族乡)
- Chencun Hui Ethnic Township (陈村回族乡)
- Daweihe Hui and Manchu Ethnic Township (大围河回族满族乡)
- Guanjiawu Hui Ethnic Township (管家务回族乡)
- Xiaxiaying Manchu Ethnic Township (西下营满族乡)
- Tangquan Manchu Ethnic Township (汤泉满族乡)
- Dongling Manchu Ethnic Township (东陵满族乡)
- Da'erhao Hui Ethnic Township (大二号回族乡)
- Wangjialou Hui Ethnic Township (王家楼回族乡)

=== Heilongjiang ===
- Liaodian Manchu Ethnic Township (料甸满族乡)
- Hongqi Manchu Ethnic Township (红旗满族乡)
- Hedong Korean Ethnic Township (河东朝鲜族乡)
- Yuchi Korean Ethnic Township (鱼池朝鲜族乡)
- Qingling Manchu Ethnic Township (青岭满族乡)
- Lianxing Ethnic Township (联兴满族乡)
- Xingfu Manchu Ethnic Township (幸福满族乡)
- Xinxing Manchu Ethnic Township (新兴满族乡)
- Gongzheng Manchu Ethnic Township (公正满族乡)
- Lequn Manchu Ethnic Township (乐群满族乡)
- Xile Manchu Ethnic Township (希勤满族乡)
- Tongxin Manchu Ethnic Township (同心满族乡)
- Tuanjie Manchu Ethnic Township (团结满族乡)
- Niujia Manchu Ethnic Town (牛家满族镇)
- Lalin Manchu Ethnic Town (拉林满族镇)
- Hongqi Manchu Ethnic Township (红旗满族乡)
- Yingchengzi Manchu Ethnic Township (营城子满族乡)
- Minle Korean Ethnic Ethnic Township (民乐朝鲜族乡)
- Yinglan Korean Ethnic Township (迎兰朝鲜族乡)
- Haode Mongol Ethnic Township (浩德蒙古族乡)
- Yishun Mongol Ethnic Township (义顺蒙古族乡)
- Chaodeng Mongol Ethnic Township (超等蒙古族乡)
- Baiyinna Oroqen Ethnic Township (白银纳鄂伦春族乡)
- Shibazhan Oroqen Ethnic Township (十八站鄂伦春族乡)
- Dongming Korean Ethnic Township (东明朝鲜族乡)
- Xinsheng Oroqen Ethnic Township (新生鄂伦春族乡)
- Sijiazi Manchu Ethnic Township (四嘉子满族乡)
- Kunhe Daur and Manchu Ethnic Township (河达斡尔族满族乡)
- Yanjiang Manchu and Daur Ethnic Township (沿江满族达斡尔族乡)
- Xinxing Oroqen Ethnic Township (新兴鄂伦春族乡)
- Xin'e Oroqen Ethnic Township (新鄂鄂伦春族乡)
- Jilin Korean Ethnic Township (鸡林朝鲜族乡)
- Mingde Korean Ethnic Township (明德朝鲜族乡)
- Hainan Korean Ethnic Township (海南朝鲜族乡)
- Xin'an Korean Ethnic Town (新安朝鲜族镇)
- Sanchakou Korean Ethnic Town (三岔口朝鲜族镇)
- Shuishiying Manchu Ethnic Town (水师营满族镇)
- Du'ermenqin Daur Ethnic Township (杜尔门沁达斡尔族乡)
- Woniutu Daur Ethnic Town (卧牛吐达斡尔族镇)
- Manggetu Daur Ethnic Township (莽格吐达斡尔族乡)
- Xingwang Evenk Ethnic Township (兴旺鄂温克族乡)
- Taha Manchu and Daur Ethnic Township (塔哈满族达斡尔族乡)
- Youyi Daur, Manchu, and Kirghiz Ethnic Township (友谊达斡尔族满族柯尔克孜族乡)
- Jiangqiao Mongol Ethnic Town (江桥蒙古族镇)
- Ningjiang Mongol Ethnic Township (宁姜蒙古族乡)
- Shengli Mongol Ethnic Township (胜利蒙古族乡)
- Xiangshu Korean Ethnic Township (杏树朝鲜族乡)
- Sipai Nani Ethnic Township (四排赫哲族乡)
- Chengfu Korean and Manchu Ethnic Township (成富朝鲜族满族乡)
- Xiangbai Manchu Ethnic Township (厢白满族乡)
- Nianfeng Korean Ethnic Township (年丰朝鲜族乡)

=== Henan ===
- Jinzhai Hui Ethnic Township (金寨回族乡)
- Chanhe Hui Ethnic Township (瀍河回族乡)
- Yuandian Hui Ethnic Township (袁店回族乡)
- Guozhuang Hui Ethnic Township (郭庄回族乡)
- Yaozhuang Hui Ethnic Township (姚庄回族乡)
- Mazhuang Hui Ethnic Township (马庄回族乡)
- Bodang Hui Ethnic Township (伯党回族乡)
- Huji Hui Ethnic Township (胡集回族乡)
- Shanhuo Hui Ethnic Township (山货回族乡)
- Aizhuang Hui Ethnic Township (艾庄回族乡)
- Caizhai Hui Ethnic Township (蔡寨回族乡)

=== Hunan ===
- Daqiao Yao Ethnic Township

=== Inner Mongolia ===
- Enhe Russian Ethnic Township

=== Jiangsu ===
- Lingtang Hui Ethnic Township (菱塘回族乡)

=== Jiangxi ===
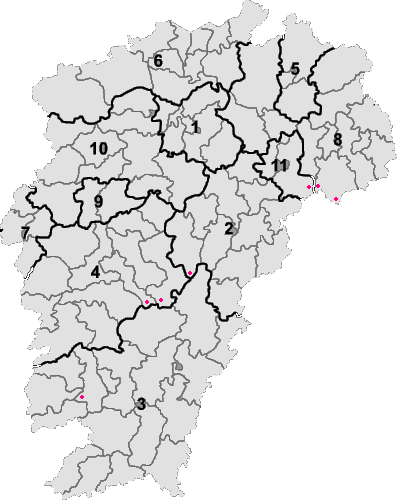
She ethnic townships in Jiangxi

==== Shangrao Municipality ====
Taiyuan She-nation Ethnic Township (太源畲族乡) in Yanshan County

Huangbi She-nation Ethnic Township (篁碧畲族乡) in Yanshan County

==== Yingtan Municipality ====
Zhangping She-nation Ethnic Township (樟坪畲族乡) in Guixi City

==== Fuzhou Municipality ====
Jinzhu She-nation Ethnic Township (金竹畲族乡) in Le'an County

==== Ganzhou Municipality ====
Chitu She-nation Ethnic Township (赤土畲族乡) in Nankang City

==== Ji'an Municipality ====
Donggu She-nation Ethnic Township (东固畲族乡) in Qingyuan District

Longgang She-nation Ethnic Township (龙冈畲族乡) in Yongfeng County

Jinping Minority-nation Ethnic Township (金坪民族乡) (Note: Est. 2008, Jinping is home to eight minority nations, living in 19 designated villages (村, cun). The township as a whole cannot be said to be expressly for the She. In all, Jiangxi Province has 56 She villages in non-She-nation townships.) in Xiajiang County

=== Jilin ===
- Shuangyingzi Hui Ethnic Township (双营子回族乡)
- Hujia Hui Ethnic Township (胡家回族乡)
- Mangka Manchu Ethnic Township (莽卡满族乡)
- Yanhe Korean Ethnic Township (延和朝鲜族乡)
- Xin'aili Mongol Ethnic Township (新艾里蒙古族乡)
- Hulitu Mongol Ethnic Township (胡力吐蒙古族乡)
- Huhecheli Mongol Ethnic Township (呼和车力蒙古族乡)
- Xianghai Mongol Ethnic Township (向海蒙古族乡)
- Baolawendu Mongol Ethnic Township (包拉温都蒙古族乡)
- Hatuqi Mongol Ethnic Township (哈吐气蒙古族乡)
- Momoge Mongol Ethnic Township (莫莫格蒙古族乡)
- Wulajie Manchu Ethnic Town (乌拉街满族镇)
- Wulin Korean Ethnic Township (乌林朝鲜族乡)
- Sanhe Manchu and Korean Ethnic Township (三合满族朝鲜族乡)
- Yehe Manchu Ethnic Town (叶赫满族镇)
- Ershijiazi Manchu Ethnic Town (二十家子满族镇)
- Fangmagou Manchu Ethnic Township (放马沟满族乡)
- Namusi Mongol Ethnic Township (那木斯蒙古族乡)
- Xiaoyang Manchu and Korean Ethnic Township (小杨满族朝鲜族乡)
- Huayuan Korean Ethnic Township (花园朝鲜族乡)
- Liangshui Korean Ethnic Township (凉水朝鲜族乡)
- Loujie Korean Ethnic Township (楼街朝鲜族乡)
- Jiangjiadian Korean Ethnic Township (姜家店朝鲜族乡)
- Daquanyuan Manchu and Korean Ethnic Township (大泉源满族朝鲜族乡)
- Jindou Korean and Manchu Ethnic Township (金斗朝鲜族满族乡)
- Yangbaozi Manchu Ethnic Township (杨泡子满族乡)

=== Liaoning ===
- Mantang Manchu Ethnic Township (满堂满族乡)
- Sijiazi Mongol Ethnic Township (四家子蒙古族乡)
- Shajintai Mongol and Manchu Ethnic Township (沙金台蒙古族满族乡)
- Liushutun Mongol and Manchu Ethnic Township (柳树屯蒙古族满族乡)
- Dongsheng Manchu and Mongol Ethnic Township (东升满族蒙古族乡)
- Xiguantun Manchu and Mongol Ethnic Township (西关屯满族蒙古族乡)
- Qidingshan Manchu Ethnic Township (七顶山满族民族乡)
- Santai Manchu Ethnic Township (三台满族乡)
- Yangjia Manchu Ethnic Township (杨家满族乡)
- Guiyunhua Manchu Ethnic Township (桂云花满族乡)
- Taiping Manchu Ethnic Township (太平岭满族乡)
- Sishanling Manchu Ethnic Township (思山岭满族乡)
- Yahe Korean Ethnic Township (雅河朝鲜族乡)
- Liangshuihe Mongol Ethnic Township (凉水河蒙古族乡)
- Mayouying Manchu Ethnic Township (马友营蒙古族乡)
- Sanjiazi Mongol Ethnic Township (三家子蒙古族乡)
- Sanjia Mongol Ethnic Township (三家蒙古族乡)
- Dabao Mongol Ethnic Township (大堡蒙古族乡)
- Helong Manchu Ethnic Township (合隆满族乡)
- Xialuhe Korean Ethnic Township (下露河朝鲜族乡)
- Lagu Manchu Ethnic Township (拉古满族乡)
- Tangtu Manchu Ethnic Township (汤图满族乡)
- Weizigou Mongol Ethnic Township (苇子沟蒙古族乡)
- Erdaohezi Mongol Ethnic Township (二道河子蒙古族乡)
- Xiliujiazi Mongol and Manchu Ethnic Township (西六家子蒙古族满族乡)
- Daleng Mongol Ethnic Township (大冷蒙古族乡)
- Dazhai Manchu Ethnic Township (大寨满族乡)
- Sandaogou Manchu Ethnic Township (三道沟满族乡)
- Yuantaizi Manchu Ethnic Township (元台子满族乡)
- Baita Manchu Ethnic Township (白塔满族乡)
- Jiumen Manchu Ethnic Township (旧门满族乡)
- Yang'an Manchu Ethnic Township (羊安满族乡)
- Liutaizi Manchu Ethnic Township (刘台子满族乡)
- Hongyazi Manchu Ethnic Township (红崖子满族乡)
- Nandashan Manchu Ethnic Township (南大山满族乡)
- Yaowang Manchu Ethnic Township (药王满族乡)
- Gaojialing Manchu Ethnic Township (高家岭满族乡)
- Haibin Manchu Ethnic Township (海滨满族乡)
- Wanghai Manchu Ethnic Township (望海满族乡)
- Jianchang Manchu Ethnic Township (碱厂满族乡)
- Weizhan Manchu Ethnic Township (围屏满族乡)
- Erdaowanzi Mongol Ethnic Township (二道弯子蒙古族乡)
- Xipingpo Manchu Ethnic Township (西平坡满族乡)
- Gejia Manchu Ethnic Township (葛家满族乡)
- Gaodianzi Manchu Ethnic Township (高甸子满族乡)
- Fanjia Manchu Ethnic Township (范家满族乡)
- Wanghu Manchu Ethnic Township (网户满族乡)
- Mingshui Manchu Ethnic Township (明水满族乡)
- Wendilou Manchu Ethnic Township (温滴楼满族乡)
- Toutai Manchu Ethnic Township (头台满族乡)
- Dadingbao Manchu Ethnic Township (大定堡满族乡)
- Waziyu Manchu Ethnic Township (瓦子峪满族乡)
- Toudaohe Manchu Ethnic Township (头道河满族乡)
- Dicangsi Manchu Ethnic Township (地藏寺满族乡)
- Chengguan Manchu Ethnic Township (城关满族乡)
- Liulonggou Manchu Ethnic Township (留龙沟满族乡)
- Juliangtun Manchu Ethnic Township (聚粮屯满族乡)
- Tianshui Manchu Ethnic Township (甜水满族乡)
- Jidongyu Manchu Ethnic Township (吉洞峪满族乡)
- Niejia Manchu Ethnic Township (聂家满族乡)
- Shangbadi Manchu Ethnic Township (上肥地满族乡)
- Xiabadi Manchu Ethnic Township (下肥地满族乡)
- Huangqizhai Manchu Ethnic Township (黄旗寨满族乡)
- Linfeng Manchu Ethnic Township (林丰满族乡)
- Hengdaohezi Manchu Ethnic Township (横道河子满族乡)
- Baiqizhai Manchu Ethnic Township (白旗寨满族乡)
- Mingde Manchu Ethnic Township (明德满族乡)
- Dexing Manchu Ethnic Township (德兴满族乡)
- Chengping Manchu Ethnic Township (成平满族乡)
- Helong Manchu Ethnic Township (和隆满族乡)
- Yingchang Manchu Ethnic Township (营厂满族乡)
- Jinxing Manchu Township (金星满族乡)

=== Shaanxi ===
- Maoping Hui Ethnic Town (茅坪回族镇)
- Xikou Hui Ethnic Town (西口回族镇)

=== Shandong ===
- Houji Hui Ethnic Town (侯集回族镇)

=== Shanghai ===
- none

=== Shanxi ===
- none

=== Taiwan ===
The PRC has claimed the ROC’s administration over Taiwan as part of its territory and there are no ethnic townships in this region. See Indigenous Areas of the Republic of China (Taiwan) for details.

=== Tianjin ===
- Sungezhuang Manchu Ethnic Township (孙各庄满族乡)

=== Tibet ===
Within the Tibet Autonomous Region there are nine ethnic townships (མི་རིགས་ཤང་ mi-rigs shang 民族乡 mínzúxiāng), five belonging to the Monpa ethnicity (མོན་པ་/ mon pa /门巴/ Ménbā) and three belonging to the Lhopa ethnicity (ལྷོ་པ་/ lho-pa/ 珞巴/ Luòbā) and one belonging to the Naxi (ནག་ཤི་ / 纳西族 / Naxi)

Breakdown of the nine ethnic townships of Tibet

Monpa (门巴族) – 5 Townships

The Monpa people primarily inhabit the southeastern regions of Tibet. The five Monpa ethnic townships are located in Shannan (Lhoka) Prefecture: Le Monpa Township (勒门巴族乡) – Located in Cona County (错那县).

Kongri Monpa Township (贡日门巴族乡) – Also in Cona County.

Gyiba Monpa Township (吉巴门巴族乡) – In Cona County.

Marmang Monpa Township (麻玛门巴族乡) – In Cona County.

Guntshang Monpa Township (更章门巴民族乡) – In Bayi District (巴宜区) of Nyingchi Prefecture.

Lhoba (珞巴族) – 3 Townships

The Lhoba people, one of China's smallest ethnic groups, reside in the southeastern border areas of Tibet. The three Lhoba ethnic townships are: Doyul Lhoba Township (斗玉珞巴族乡) – In Lhunze County (隆子县), Shannan Prefecture.

Takmo Lhoba Township (达木珞巴族乡) – In Metok County (墨脱县), Nyingchi Prefecture.

Neyul Lhoba Township (南伊珞巴族乡) – In Mainling County (米林县), Nyingchi Prefecture.

Naxi (纳西族) – 1 Township

The Naxi people are primarily concentrated in the northwest of Yunnan Province. In Tibet, there is one Naxi ethnic township: Jangpa Miri Township (纳西民族乡) – Located in Markam County (墨脱县), Chamdo Prefecture.

=== Yunnan ===
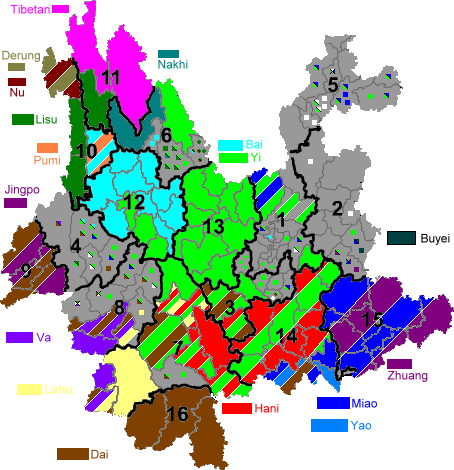
Major Autonomous areas within Yunnan. (excluding Hui)

⸻

📍 Ethnic Townships in Yunnan Province

Baoshan City

• Goujie Yi and Miao Ethnic Township • Wama Yi and Bai Ethnic Township • Wafang Yi and Miao Ethnic Township • Mangkuan Yi and Dai Ethnic Township • Hehua Dai and Wa Ethnic Township • Yangliu Bai and Yi Ethnic Township • Bailang Yi and Bulang Ethnic Township • Mulaoyuan Bulang and Yi Ethnic Township • Mucheng Yi and Lisu Ethnic Township • Wandian Dai Ethnic Township • Zhujie Yi Ethnic Township

Chuxiong Yi Autonomous Prefecture

• Yulu Bai Ethnic Township • Wanbi Dai and Lishu Ethnic Township • Yongxing Dai Ethnic Township • Dongpo Dai Ethnic Township

Dali Bai Autonomous Prefecture • Taiyi Yi Ethnic Township • Dongshan Yi Ethnic Township • Zhongying Lisu and Yi Ethnic Township • Lawu Yi Ethnic Township • Niujie Yi Ethnic Township • Changjie Yi Ethnic Township • Shuixie Yi Ethnic Township • Beidou Yi Ethnic Township • Liuhe Yi Ethnic Township • Yonghe Yi Ethnic Township • Biaocun Lisu Ethnic Township • Tuanjie Yi Ethnic Township

Dehong Dai and Jingpo Autonomous Prefecture

• Santaishan Deang Ethnic Township • Husa Achang Ethnic Township • Jiubao Achang Ethnic Township • Nangsong Achang Ethnic Township • Sudian Lisu Ethnic Township

Diqing Tibetan Autonomous Prefecture • Tuoding Lisu Ethnic Township • Xiaruo Lisu Ethnic Township • Sanba Naxi Ethnic Township

Honghe Hani and Yi Autonomous Prefecture

• Dazhuang Hui Ethnic Township • Mingjiu Miao Ethnic Township • Qilubai Miao Ethnic Township • Laozhai Miao Ethnic Township • Qiaotou Miao and Zhuang Ethnic Township • Zhemi Lahu Ethnic Township

Kunming City

• Shuanghe Yi Ethnic Township • Xiyang Yi Ethnic Township • Gengjiaying Yi and Miao Ethnic Township • Jiuxiang Yi and Hui Ethnic Township • Luomian Yi and Miao Ethnic Township • Ala Yi Ethnic Township • Shalang Bai Ethnic Township

Lijiang City

• Jinshan Bai Ethnic Township • Jinjiang Bai Ethnic Township • Shitou Bai Ethnic Township • Liming Lisu Ethnic Township • Jiuhe Bai Ethnic Township • Yangping Yi Ethnic Township • Liude Lisu and Yi Ethnic Township • Dongshan Lisu and Yi Ethnic Township • Dongfeng Lisu Ethnic Township • Guanghua Lisu and Yi Ethnic Township • Songping Lisu and Yi Ethnic Township • Daan Yi and Naxi Ethnic Township • Xinzhuang Lisu and Dai Ethnic Township • Tongda Lisu Ethnic Township • Yongxing Lisu Ethnic Township • Chuanfang Lisu and Dai Ethnic Township • Cuiyu Lisu and Pumi Ethnic Township • Shilongba Yi and Dai Ethnic Township

Lincang City

• Nanmei Lahu Ethnic Township • Pingcun Yi and Dai Ethnic Township • Xinhua Yi and Miao Ethnic Township • Yaojie Yi Ethnic Township • Guo Dazhai Yi and Bai Ethnic Township • Junsai Wa, Lahu, Lisu and Deang Ethnic Township • Manghuai Yi and Bulang Ethnic Township • Lishu Yi and Dai Ethnic Township • Houqing Yi Ethnic Township • Mengjiao Dai, Yi and Lahu Ethnic Township • Manghong Lahu and Bulang Ethnic Township • Wumulong Yi Ethnic Township • Daxueshan Yi, Lahu, Dai Ethnic Township

Nujiang Lisu Autonomous Prefecture

• Pihe Nu Ethnic Township • Laowo Bai Ethnic Township • Luobenzhuo Bai Ethnic Township

Pu’er City • Donglang Hani Ethnic Township • Lisuo Lahu Ethnic Township • Fazhanhe Hani Ethnic Township • Xuelin Wa Ethnic Township • Wendong Wa Ethnic Township • Ankang Wa Ethnic Township • Huimin Hani Ethnic Township • Jiujing Hani Ethnic Township • Qianliu Yi Ethnic Township • Yutang Yi Ethnic Township • Mengnong Yi Ethnic Township

Qujing City • Gugan Shui Ethnic Township • Lubuge Bouyei Ethnic Township • Jiuwuji Yi Ethnic Township • Changdi Buyi Ethnic Township • Wulong Zhuang Ethnic Township • Longqing Yi and Zhuang Ethnic Township • Xinjie Hui Ethnic Township • Gaoliang Zhuang, Miao and Yao Ethnic Township

Wenshan Zhuang and Miao Autonomous Prefecture • Shupi Yi Ethnic Township • Dongbo Yao Ethnic Township • Shede Yi Ethnic Township • Mengdong Yao Ethnic Township • Badaoshao Yi Ethnic Township • Nijiao Yi Ethnic Township • Xindian Yi Ethnic Township • Baxin Yi Ethnic Township • Binglie Yi Ethnic Township • Hongdian Hui Ethnic Township • Liujing Yi Ethnic Township • Dongshan Yi Ethnic Township • Ashe Yi Ethnic Township • Ganhe Yi Ethnic Township • Panlong Yi Ethnic Township • Weimo Yi Ethnic Township

Xishuangbanna Dai Autonomous Prefecture • Gelanghe Hani Ethnic Township • Bulangshan Bulang Ethnic Township • Jinuoshan Jino Ethnic Township • Xiding Hani and Bulang Ethnic Township • Jingha Hani Ethnic Township • Xiangming Yi Ethnic Township • Yaoqu Yao Ethnic Township

Yuxi City • Lishan Yi Ethnic Township • Gaoda Dai and Yi Ethnic Township • Xingmeng Mongolian Ethnic Township • Anhua Yi Ethnic Township • Tonghongdian Yi and Miao Ethnic Township • Luohe Yi Ethnic Township • Xiaoshiqiao Ethnic Township • Pubei Yi Ethnic Township • Shijie Yi Ethnic Township • Tongchang Yi Ethnic Township

Zhaotong City • Shouwang Hui Ethnic Township • Xiaolongdong Hui and Yi Ethnic Township • Qinggangling Hui and Yi Ethnic Township • Buga Hui Ethnic Township • Manan Miao and Yi Ethnic Township • Wuzhai Yi and Miao Ethnic Township • Guozhu Yi Ethnic Township • Linkou Yi and Miao Ethnic Township • Shanggaoqiao Hui, Yi and Miao Ethnic Township • Ciyuan Hui Ethnic Township • Taoyuan Hui Ethnic Township • Shuanghe Miao and Yi Ethnic Township • Kuixiang Miao and Yi Ethnic Township • Liuxi Miao Ethnic Township • Longjie Miao and Yi Ethnic Township • Luowang Miao Ethnic Township • Shulin Yi and Miao Ethnic Township

=== Zhejiang ===
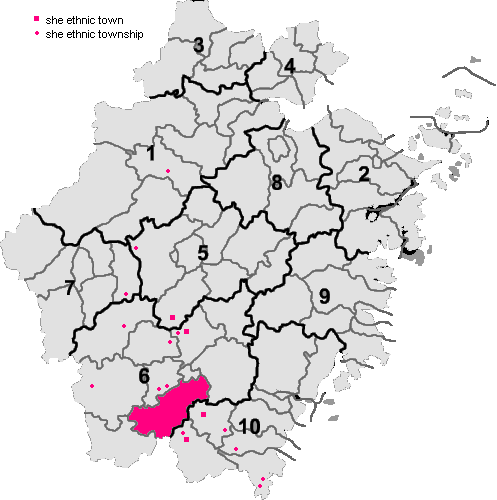
She ethnic county, townships and towns in Zhejiang

- Eshan She Ethnic Township (莪山畲族乡)
- Shuiting She Ethnic Township (水亭畲族乡)
- Liucheng She Ethnic Town (柳城畲族镇)
- Laozhu She Ethnic Town (老竹畲族镇)
- Lixin She Ethnic Township (丽新畲族乡)
- Zhuyang She Ethnic Township (竹垟畲族乡)
- Banqiao She Ethnic Township (板桥畲族乡)
- Sanren She Ethnic Township (三仁畲族乡)
- Wuxi She Ethnic Township (雾溪畲族乡)
- Anxi She Ethnic Township (安溪畲族乡)
- Shujian She Ethnic Township (沐尘畲族乡)
- Fengyang She Ethnic Township (凤阳畲族乡)
- Dailing She Ethnic Township (岱岭畲族乡)
- Qingjie She Ethnic Township (青街畲族乡)
- Siqian She Ethnic Town (司前畲族镇)
- Zhuli She Ethnic Township (竹里畲族乡)
- Xikeng She Ethnic Town (西坑畲族镇)
- Zhoushan She Ethnic Township (周山畲族乡)

== Maps ==
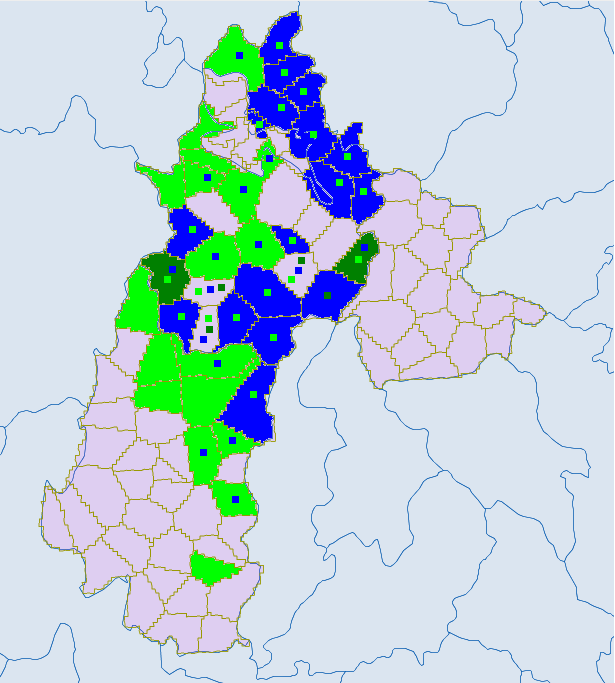
Ethnic townships in Liupanshui except Liuzhi. Light green – Yi. Blue – Miao. Dark green – Bouyei

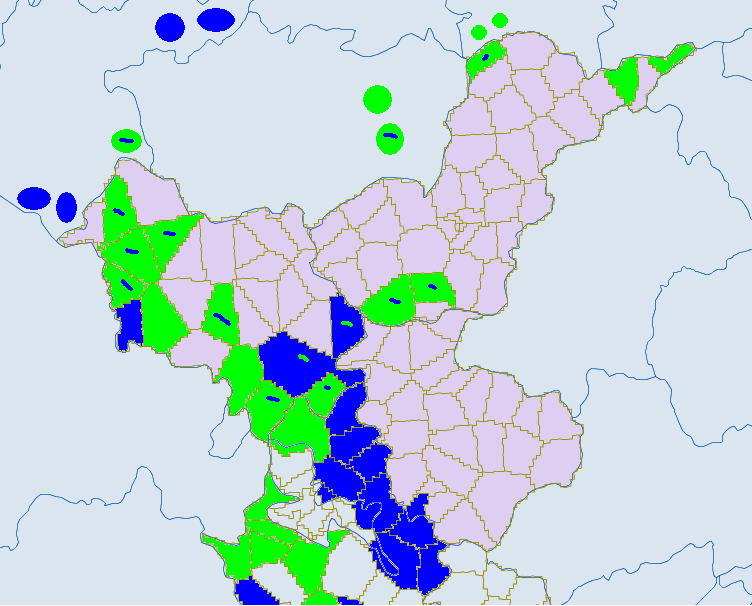
Ethnic townships in Bijie. Light green – Yi. Blue – Miao. Dark green – Bouyei

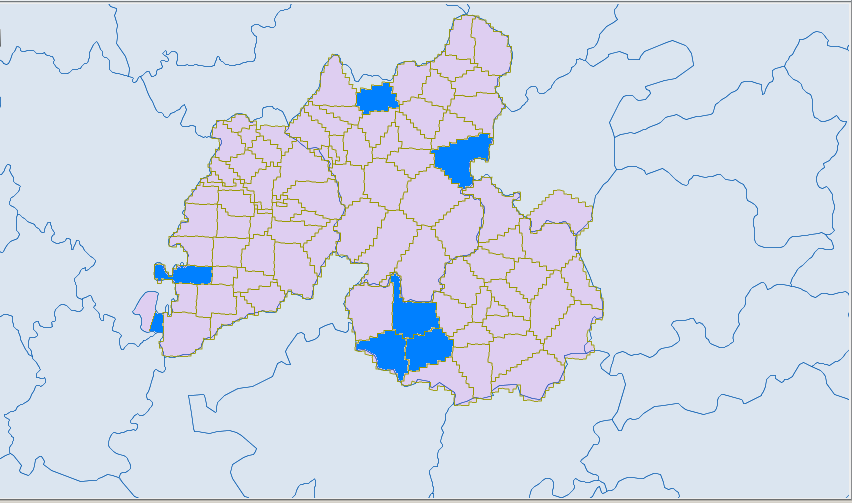
Ethnic townships in South-Eastern Hunan. Blue – Yao.

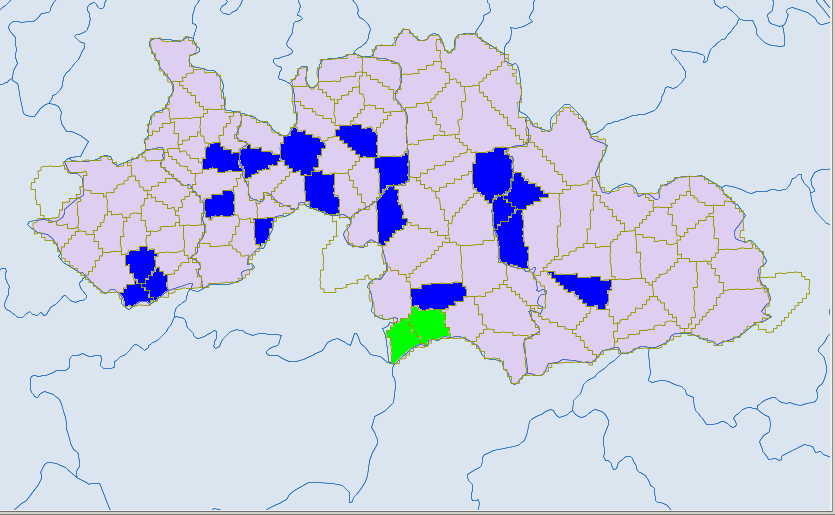
Ethnic townships in South Sichuan: Yibin and Luzhou. Light green – Yi. Blue – Miao.

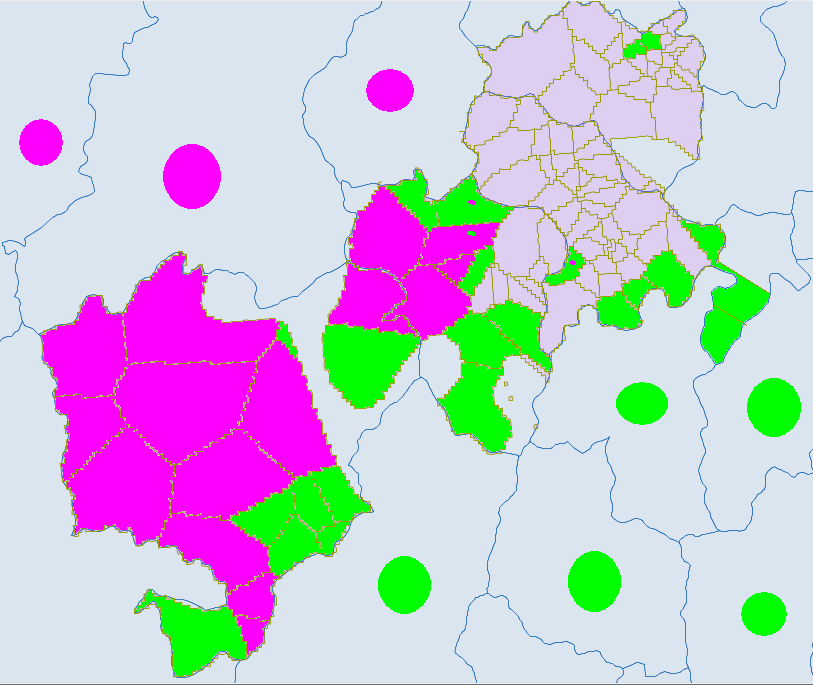
Ethnic townships in Central Sichuan Ya'an and Garzê. Light green – Yi. Red – Tibetan.

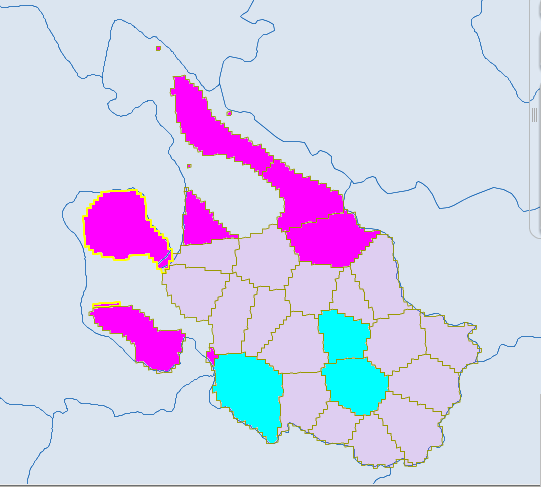
Ethnic townships in Sichuan Mianyang. Purple – Qiang. Red – Tibetan.

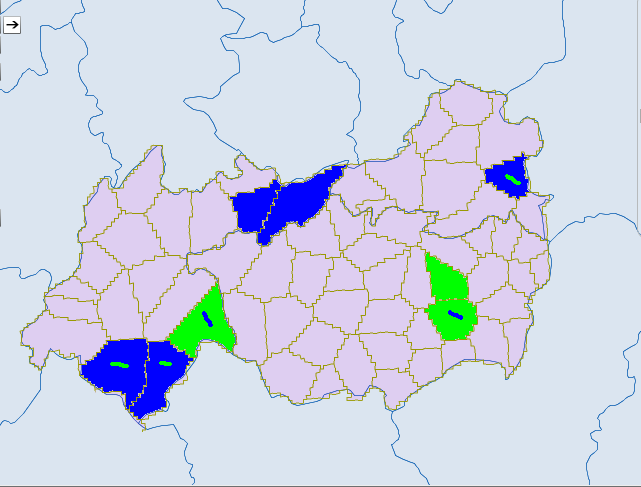
Ethnic townships in Yunnan Zhenxiong. Light green – Yi. Blue – Miao.

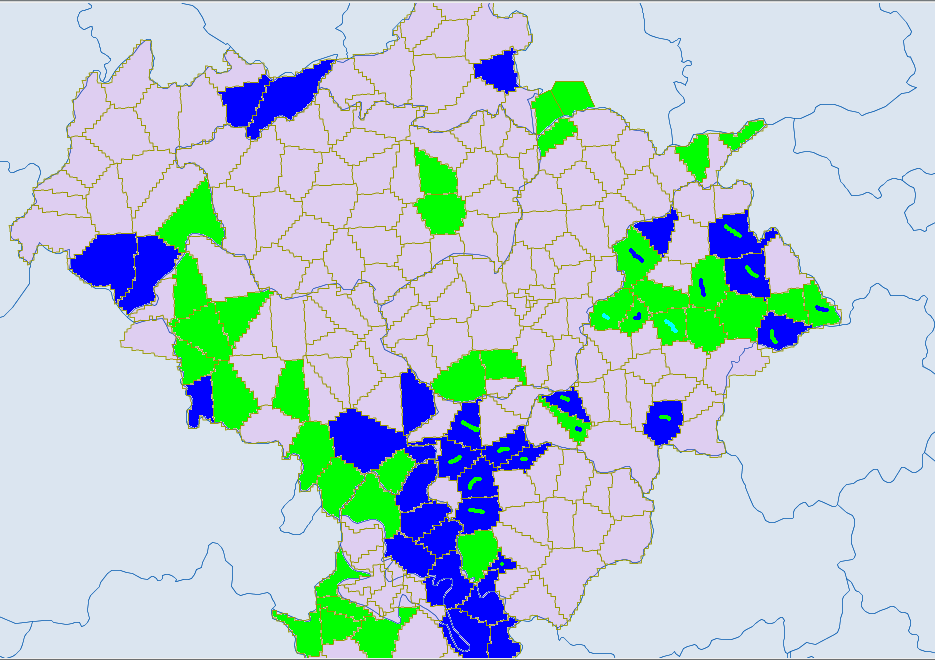
Ethnic townships in Yunnan, Sichuan, Guizhou. Light green – Yi. Blue – Miao.

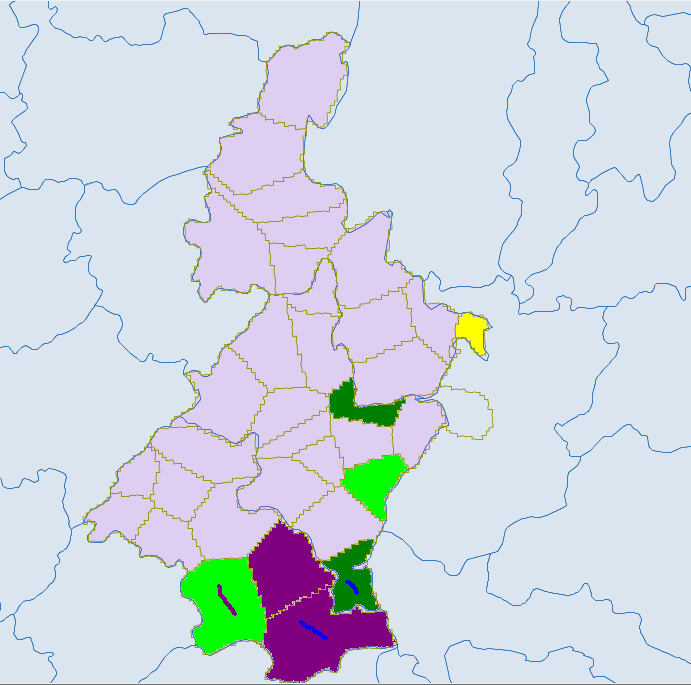
Ethnic townships in Yunnan Qujing. Light green – Yi. Blue – Miao. Red – Zhuang. Dark green – Bouyei. Yellow – Shui
