= Qijia =

Qijia may refer to:

- Qijia culture, early Bronze Age culture distributed around western Gansu and eastern Qinghai, China
- Qijia, Longhua County, town in Longhua County, Hebei, China
- Qijia Township, township in Shangyi County, Hebei, China
