= Tiechang =

Tiechang may refer to the following towns in China:

- Tiechang, Longchuan County, Guangdong (铁场镇)

Written as "铁厂镇"

- Tiechang, Zunyi County, in Zunyi County, Guizhou
- Tiechang, Zunhua, Hebei
- Tiechang, Tonghua, in Erdaojiang District, Tonghua, Jilin
- Tiechang, Zhen'an County, in Zhen'an County, Shaanxi
