= Changying, Beijing =

Changying Hui Ethnic Township 常营回族乡
- Ethnic Township
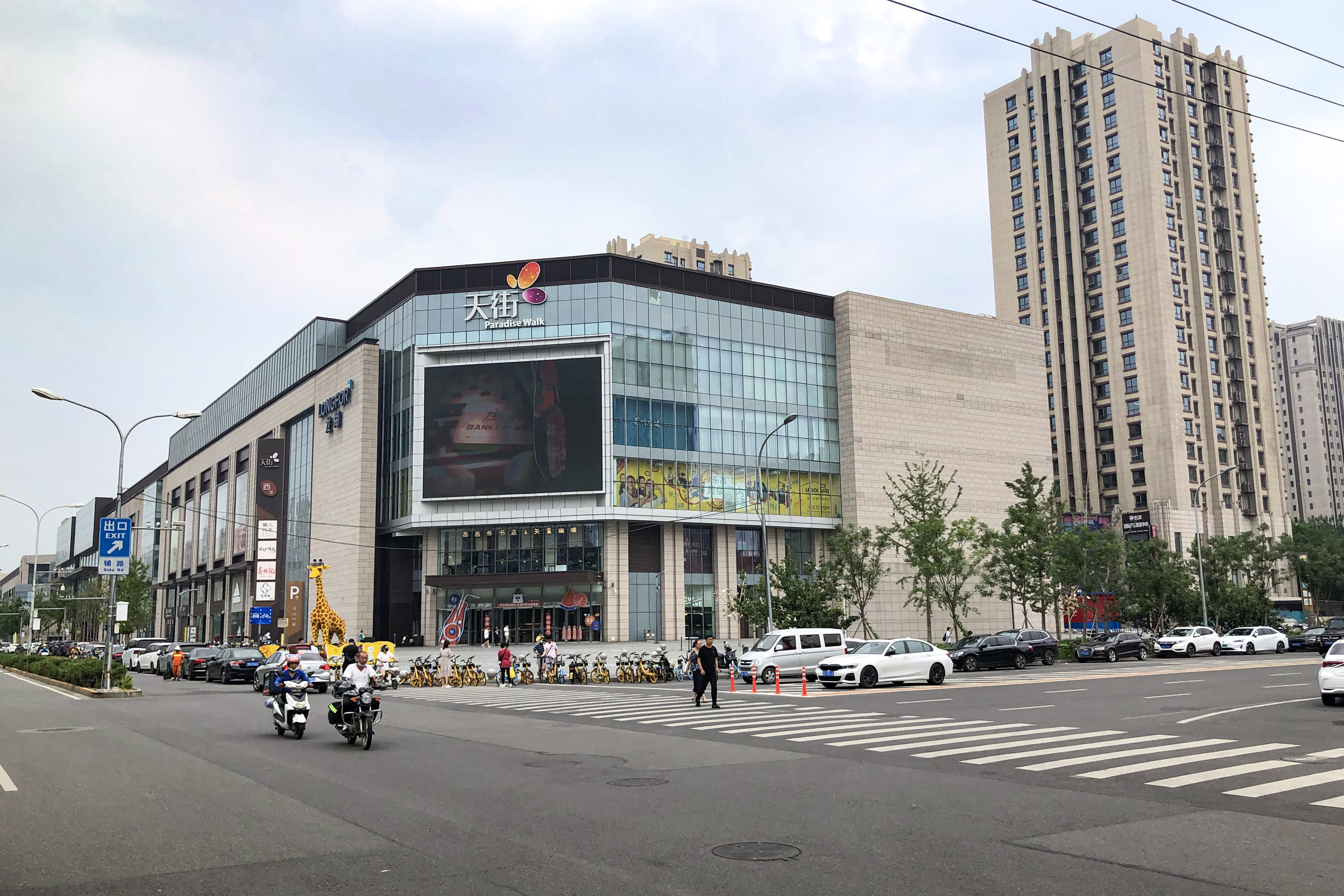
- Changying Paradise Walk, 2021

- Location within Beijing Location within China
- Coordinates: 39°55′53″N 116°34′52″E
- Country: China
- Municipality: Beijing
- District: Chaoyang
- Village-level Divisions: 16 communities

Area
  - Total: 9.26 km^{2} (3.58 sq mi)

Population (2020)
  - Total: 113,891
  - Density: 12,300/km^{2} (31,900/sq mi)
- Time zone: UTC+8 (China Standard)
- Postal code: 100024
- Area code: 010

Changying Hui Ethnic Township (Chinese: 常营回族乡; pinyin: Chángyíng Huízú Xiāng) is a Hui ethnic township located on the eastern portion of Chaoyang District, Beijing, China. It borders Dongba and Jinzhan Townships to the north, Yongshun Town to the east, Guanzhuang and Sanjianfang Townships to the south, and Pingfang Township to the west. As of the 2020 Chinese census, Changying was home to 113,891 people.

In 1368, Ming general Chang Yuchun had his trooped stationed here during his conquest of Khanbaliq, and the region was named Changying (Chinese: 常营; lit. 'Chang's Barrack') accordingly.

== History ==
Timetable of Changying
Year	Status
Ming dynasty	Established as a Hui village in honor of general Chang Yuchun's service
1958	Part of a people's commune
1984	Restored as Changying Hui Ethnic Township, part of Shuangqiao Rural Bureau, Tongzhou
1998	Transferred under Chaoyang District
2002	Becoming an area while retaining township status

== Administrative Divisions ==
As of 2021, Changying has direct jurisdiction over 16 residential communities:

Administrative Division Code	Community Name in English	Community Name in Simplified Chinese
110105033002	Huiwanhong	荟万鸿
110105033003	Xinzhao Jiayuan	鑫兆佳园
110105033004	Wanxiang Xintian	万象新天
110105033005	Changying Minzu Jiayuan	常营民族家园
110105033006	Lianxinyuan	连心园
110105033007	Pingguopai	苹果派
110105033008	Changying Fudi	常营福第
110105033009	Changxin Yangguang	畅心阳光
110105033010	Changying Baoli	常营保利
110105033011	Lijingyuan	丽景园
110105033012	Zhuxin Jiayuan	住欣家园
110105033013	Dongfang Huating	东方华庭
110105033014	Xinzhao Jiayuanbei	鑫兆佳园北
110105033015	Wanxiang Xintianbei	万象新天北
110105033016	Yanbao Huihong Jiayuan	燕保汇鸿家园
110105033017	Yanbao Changying Jiayuan	燕保常营家园

== Gallery ==
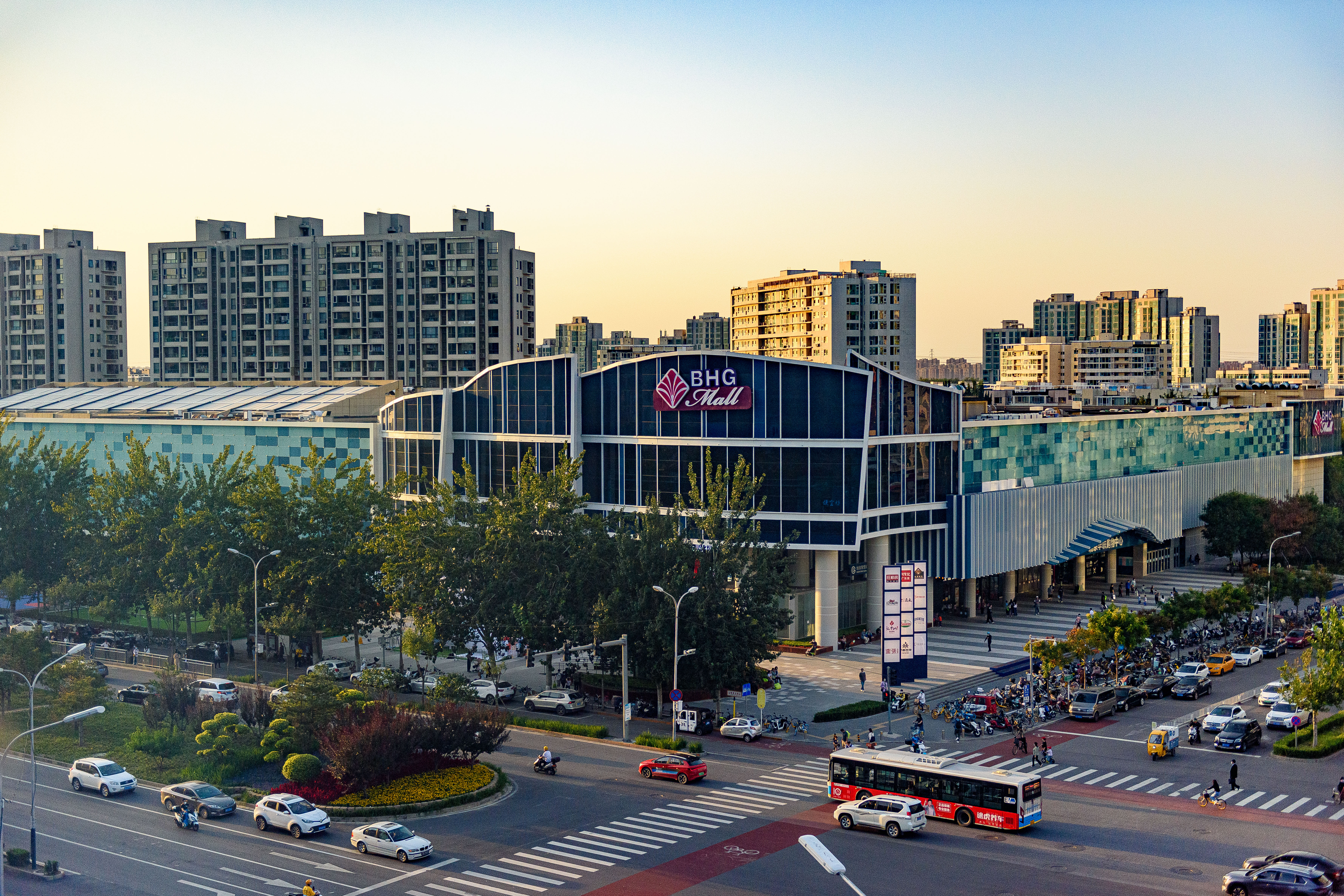
BHG Mall Changying, 2021

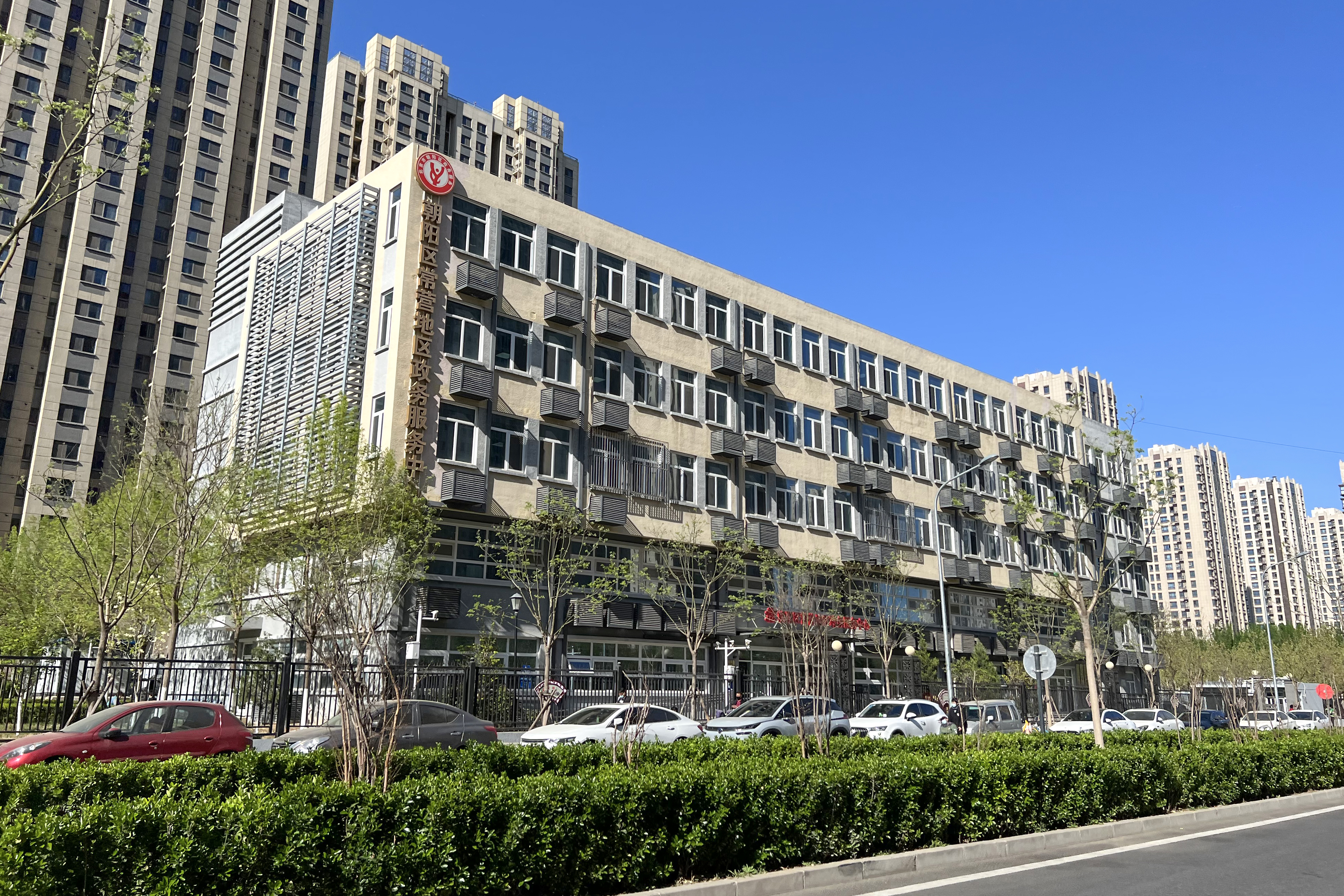
Government headquarters of Changying, 2022

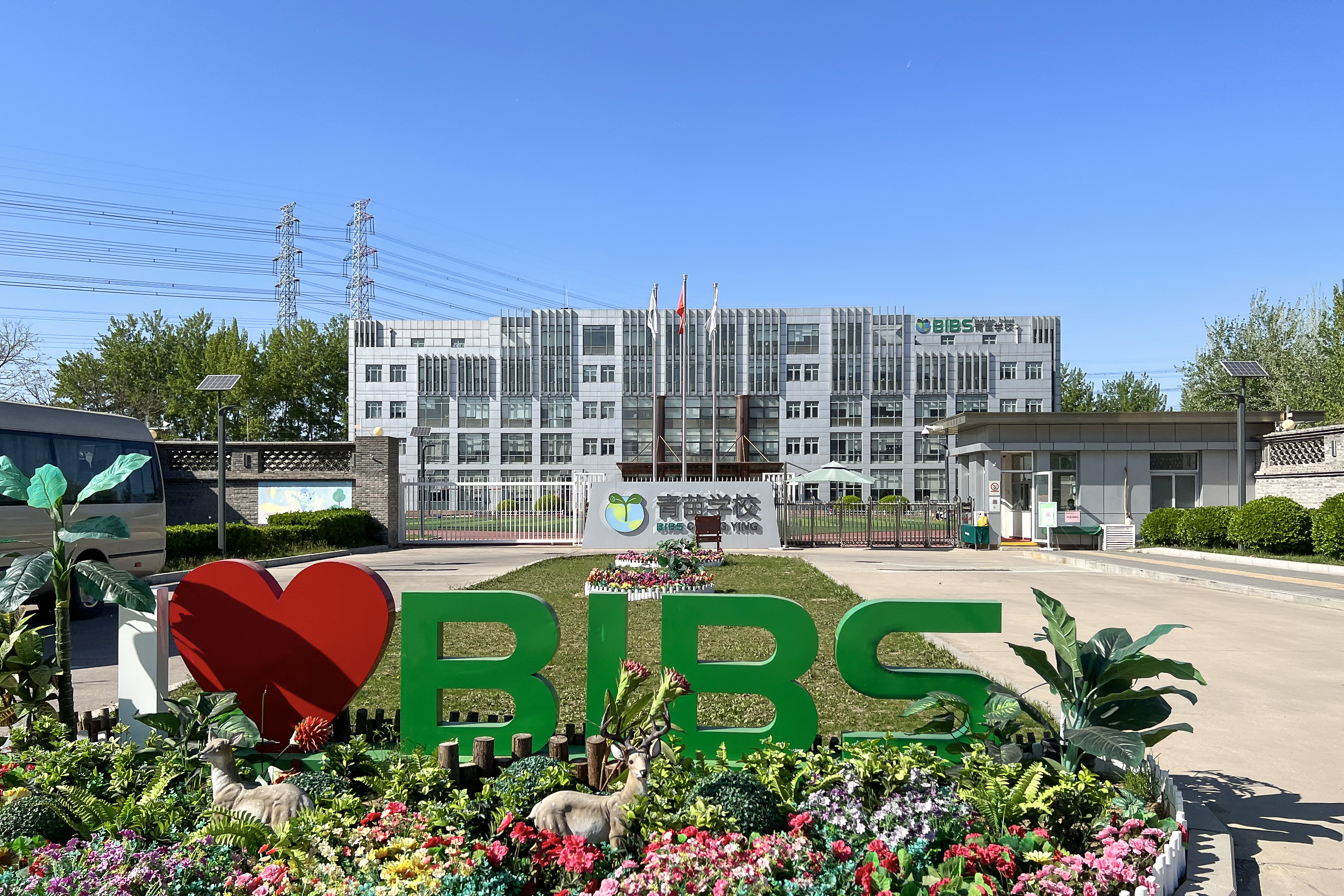
Beanstalk International Bilingual School Changying, 2022

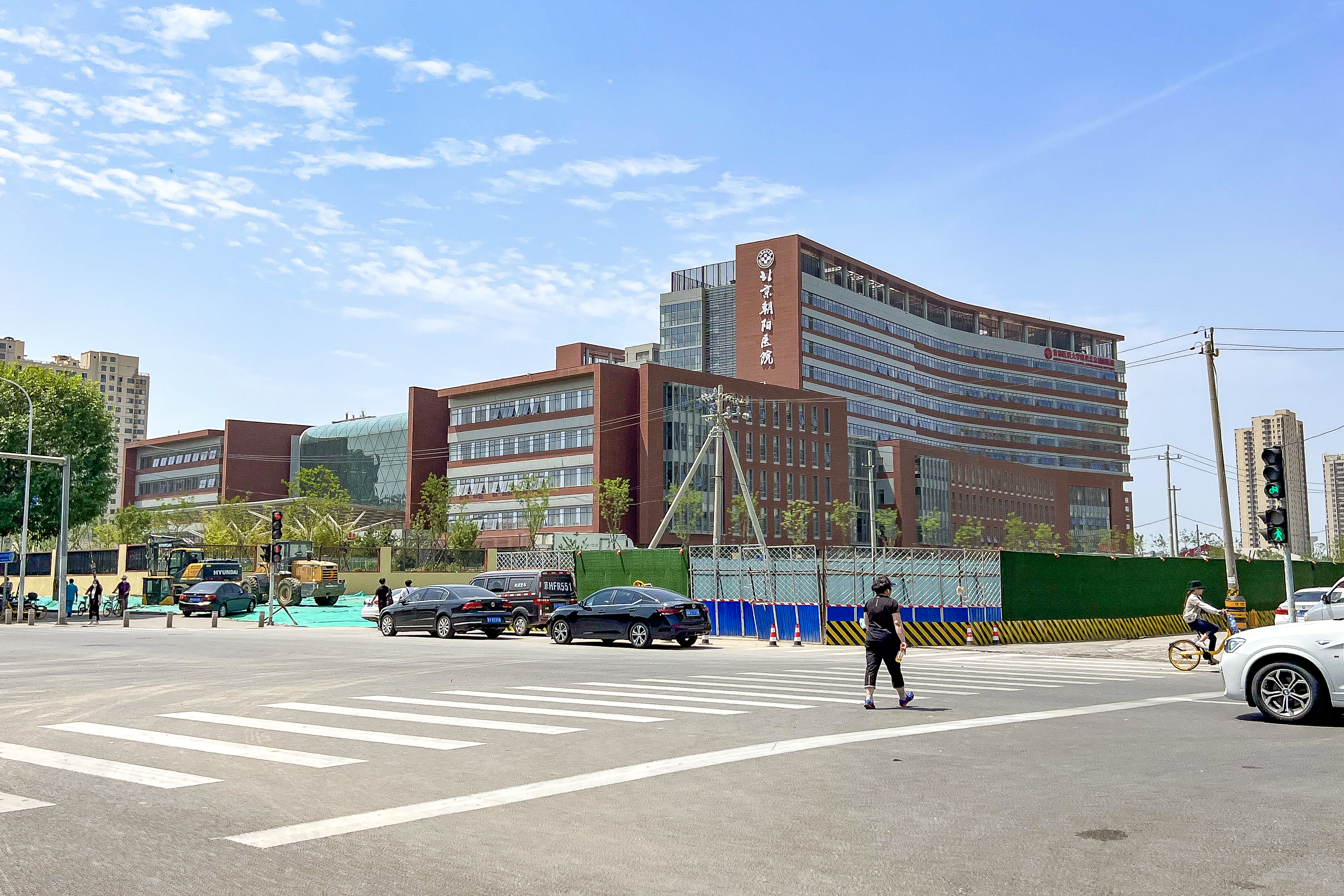
Beijing Chaoyang Hospital Changying branch, 2023

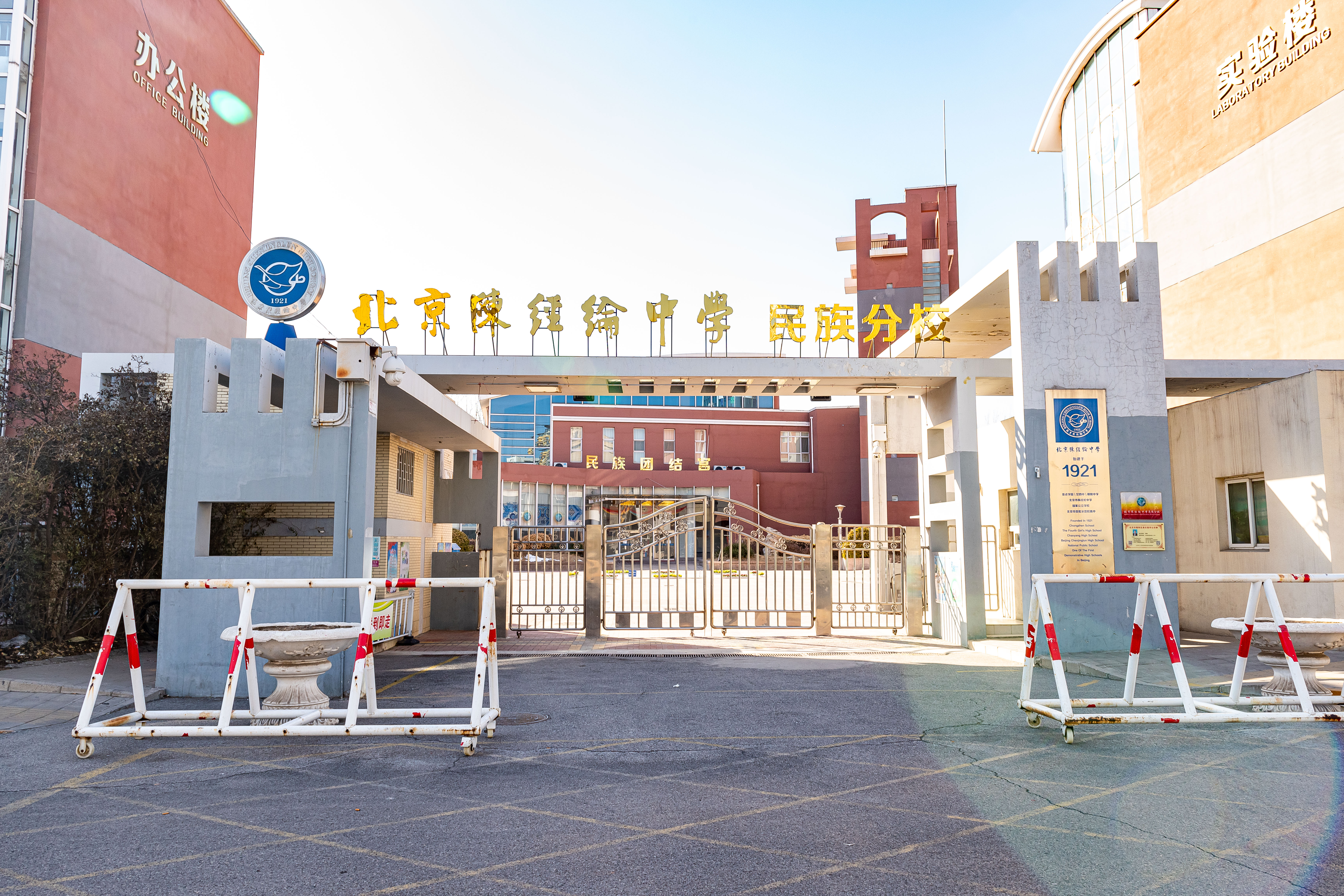
Beijing Chenjinglun High School Minzu Branch, 2024

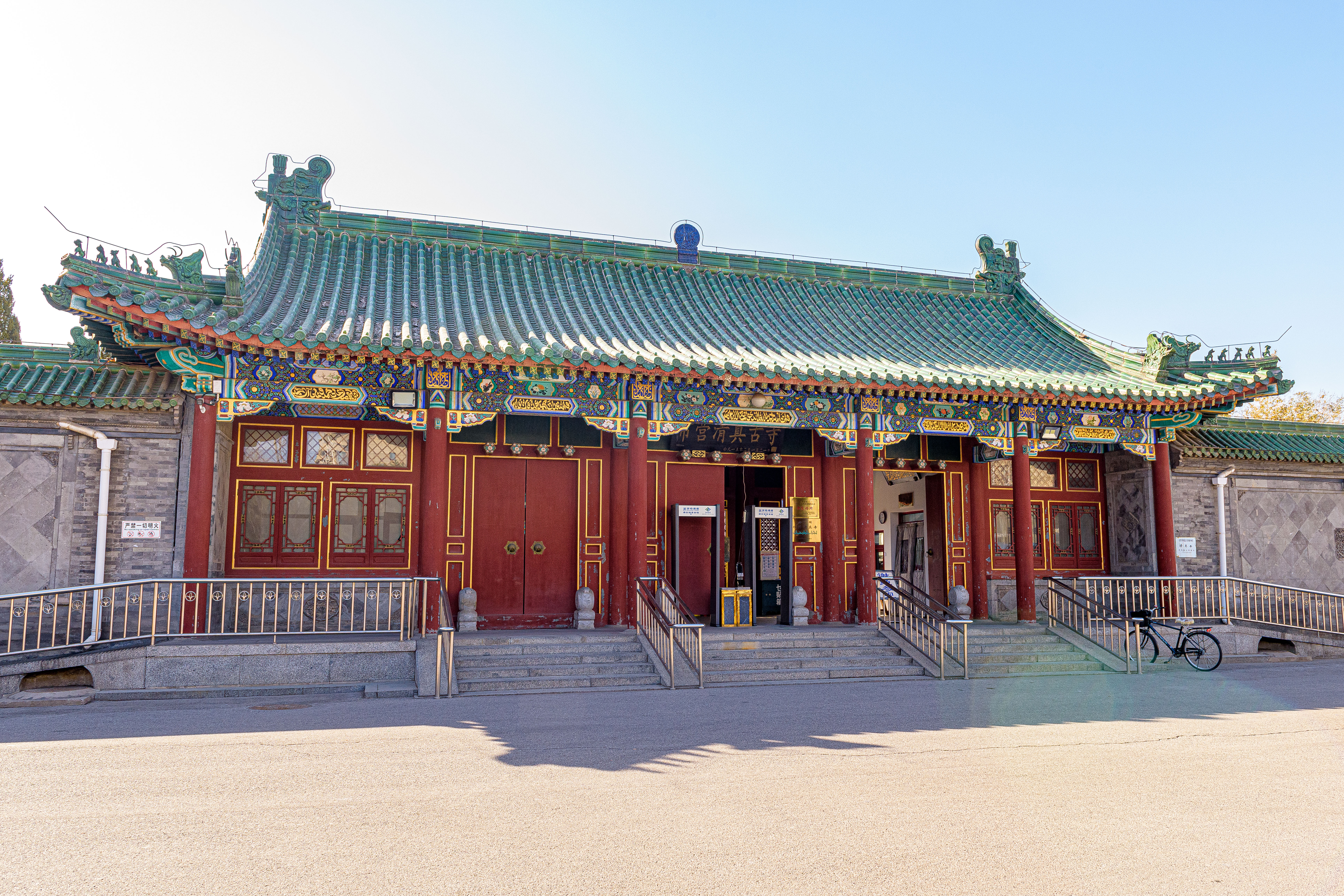
Changying Mosque, 2024

== See also ==
- List of township-level divisions of Beijing
