= Zhen'an County =

Zhen'an County 镇安县 Chenan
- County
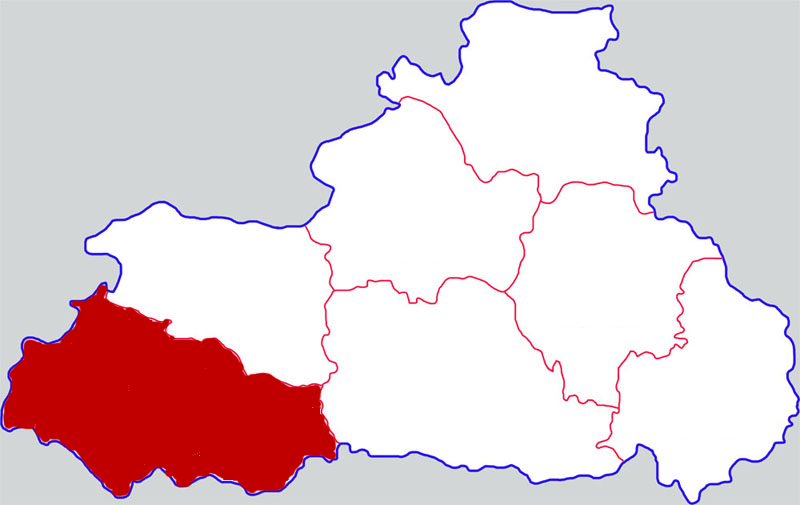
- Zhen'an in Shangluo

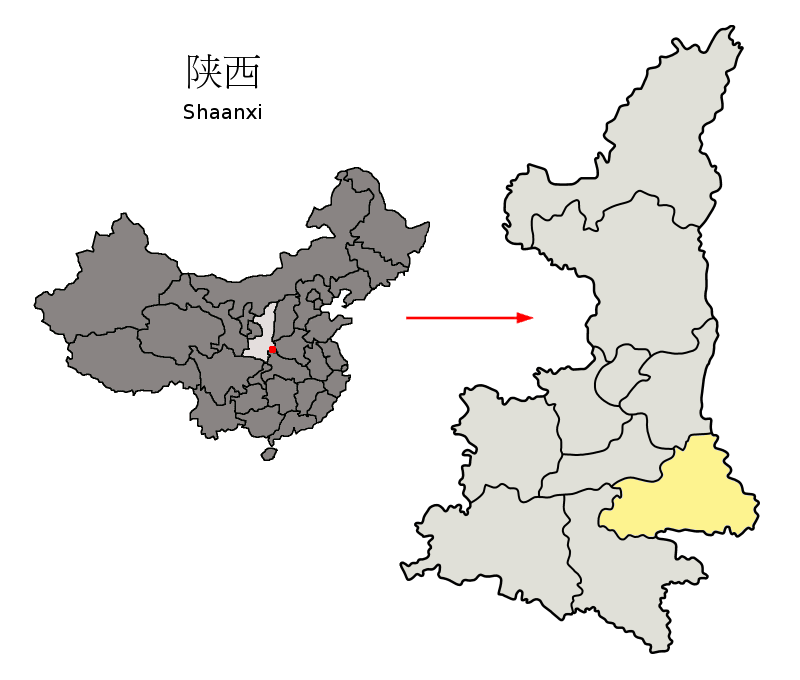
- Shangluo in Shaanxi
- Coordinates: 33°25′23″N 109°09′11″E
- Country: People's Republic of China
- Province: Shaanxi
- Prefecture-level city: Shangluo

Area
  - Total: 3,487 km^{2} (1,346 sq mi)

Population (2004)
  - Total: 283,312
  - Density: 81.25/km^{2} (210.4/sq mi)
- Time zone: UTC+8 (China Standard)
- Postal code: 711500
- Area code: 0914

Zhen'an County (simplified Chinese: 镇安县; traditional Chinese: 鎮安縣; pinyin: Zhèn'ān Xiàn) is a county in the south of Shaanxi province, China. It is under the administration and located in the southwest corner of the prefecture-level city of Shangluo, and has an area of 3,487 km^{2} (1,346 sq mi) and a population of 283,312 as of 2004.

== Administrative divisions ==
Zhen'an County administers 1 subdistrict, 12 towns, 2 ethnic towns, and 3 other township-level divisions.

=== Subdistricts ===
As of 2020, the county's sole subdistrict is Yongle Subdistrict (永乐街道).

=== Towns ===
Zhen'an County's 12 towns are as follows:

- Huilong (回龙镇)
- Tiechang (铁厂镇)
- Daping (大坪镇)
- Miliang (米粮镇)
- Gaofeng (高峰镇)
- Qingtongguan (青铜关镇)
- Chaiping (柴坪镇)
- Daren (达仁镇)
- Muwang (木王镇)
- Yungaisi (云盖寺镇)
- Miaogou (庙沟镇)
- Yuehe (月河镇)

=== Ethnic towns ===
Zhen'an County's 2 ethnic towns are Maoping Hui Ethnic Town (茅坪回族镇) and Xikou Hui Ethnic Town (西口回族镇).

=== Other township-level divisions ===
Additionally, Zhen'an County administers the following three divisions which have township-level status:

- Heiyaogou Forestry Factory (Chinese: 黑窑沟林厂)
- Muwang Forestry Factory (Chinese: 木王林厂)
- Zhen'an County Nursery (Chinese: 镇安县苗圃)

== Climate ==
Climate data for Zhen'an, elevation 694 m (2,277 ft), (1991–2020 normals, extremes 1981–2010)
Month	Jan	Feb	Mar	Apr	May	Jun	Jul	Aug	Sep	Oct	Nov	Dec	Year
Record high °C (°F)	19.3 (66.7)	23.7 (74.7)	32.7 (90.9)	35.5 (95.9)	36.3 (97.3)	39.8 (103.6)	40.2 (104.4)	39.0 (102.2)	39.2 (102.6)	31.4 (88.5)	25.8 (78.4)	19.1 (66.4)	40.2 (104.4)
Mean daily maximum °C (°F)	8.5 (47.3)	11.8 (53.2)	17.1 (62.8)	23.3 (73.9)	26.4 (79.5)	30.0 (86.0)	31.9 (89.4)	30.9 (87.6)	25.3 (77.5)	20.1 (68.2)	14.8 (58.6)	9.7 (49.5)	20.8 (69.5)
Daily mean °C (°F)	2.0 (35.6)	5.1 (41.2)	9.8 (49.6)	15.3 (59.5)	18.7 (65.7)	22.6 (72.7)	25.0 (77.0)	24.1 (75.4)	19.3 (66.7)	13.9 (57.0)	8.3 (46.9)	3.3 (37.9)	14.0 (57.1)
Mean daily minimum °C (°F)	−2.3 (27.9)	0.5 (32.9)	4.5 (40.1)	9.4 (48.9)	13.2 (55.8)	17.3 (63.1)	20.4 (68.7)	19.8 (67.6)	15.6 (60.1)	10.2 (50.4)	4.2 (39.6)	−0.9 (30.4)	9.3 (48.8)
Record low °C (°F)	−10.3 (13.5)	−8.3 (17.1)	−6.1 (21.0)	−0.7 (30.7)	3.1 (37.6)	9.4 (48.9)	12.7 (54.9)	11.7 (53.1)	5.0 (41.0)	−1.9 (28.6)	−6.4 (20.5)	−13.7 (7.3)	−13.7 (7.3)
Average precipitation mm (inches)	5.9 (0.23)	12.0 (0.47)	27.8 (1.09)	45.4 (1.79)	82.3 (3.24)	97.6 (3.84)	134.6 (5.30)	126.2 (4.97)	120.8 (4.76)	71.8 (2.83)	27.6 (1.09)	5.2 (0.20)	757.2 (29.81)
Average precipitation days (≥ 0.1 mm)	4.3	5.1	7.3	9.0	11.5	10.8	13.8	11.5	12.3	11.4	7.3	4.3	108.6
Average snowy days	4.5	2.9	1.2	0.1	0	0	0	0	0	0	1.0	1.7	11.4
Average relative humidity (%)	63	61	60	63	70	73	78	79	82	82	75	66	71
Mean monthly sunshine hours	133.8	123.5	160.2	183.0	187.2	192.4	210.9	198.6	131.8	122.9	124.9	142.8	1,912
Percentage possible sunshine	42	40	43	47	44	45	48	48	36	35	40	47	43
Source: China Meteorological Administration

== Transportation ==
- Zhen'an is served by the Xi'an–Ankang Railway
- China National Highway 345
