= Longhua County =

Longhua County 隆化县 Lunghwa
- County
- Location of the seat in Hebei
- Coordinates: 41°18′50″N 117°44′20″E
- Country: People's Republic of China
- Province: Hebei
- Prefecture-level city: Chengde

Area
  - Total: 5,444 km^{2} (2,102 sq mi)

Population (2020 census)
  - Total: 347,707
  - Density: 63.87/km^{2} (165.4/sq mi)
- Time zone: UTC+8 (China Standard)

Longhua County (simplified Chinese: 隆化县; traditional Chinese: 隆化縣; pinyin: Lónghuà Xiàn) is a county in the northeast of Hebei province, China, bordering Inner Mongolia to the east. It is under the administration of Chengde City.

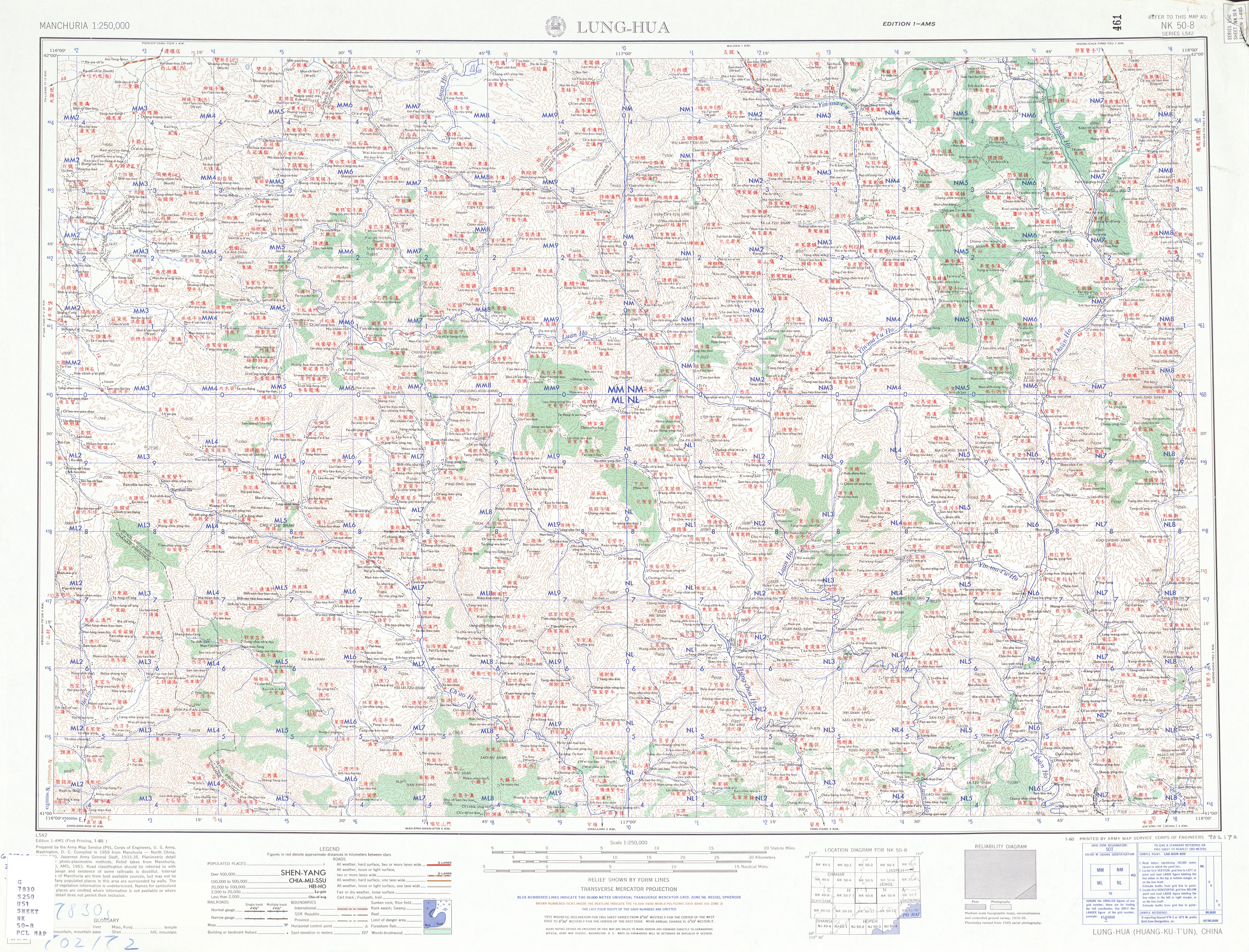
Map including Longhua area (AMS, 1959)

== Administrative divisions ==
Towns:

- Longhua Town (隆化镇), Hanmaying (韩麻营镇), Zhongguan (中关镇), Qijia (七家镇), Tangtougou (汤头沟镇), Zhangsanying (张三营镇), Tangsanying (唐三营镇), Lanqi (蓝旗镇), Bugugou (步古沟镇), Guojiatun (郭家屯镇)

Townships:

- Huangdi Township (荒地乡), Zhangjiying Township (章吉营乡), Maojingba Township (茅荆坝乡), Shanwan Township (山湾乡), Jianfang Township (碱房乡), Hanjiadian Township (韩家店乡), Wangoumen Township (湾沟门乡), Yinjiaying Manchu Ethnic Township (尹家营满族乡), Miaozigou Mongol and Manchu Ethnic Township (庙子沟蒙古族满族乡), Pianpoying Manchu Ethnic Township (偏坡营满族乡), Badaying Mongol Ethnic Township (八达营蒙古族乡), Taipingzhuang Manchu Ethnic Township (太平庄满族乡), Jiutun Manchu Ethnic Township (旧屯满族乡), Xi'achao Manchu and Mongol Ethnic Township (西阿超满族蒙古族乡), Baihugou Manchu and Mongol Ethnic Township (白虎沟满族蒙古族乡)

== Climate ==
Climate data for Longhua, elevation 600 m (2,000 ft), (1991–2020 normals, extremes 1981–2010)
Month	Jan	Feb	Mar	Apr	May	Jun	Jul	Aug	Sep	Oct	Nov	Dec	Year
Record high °C (°F)	8.4 (47.1)	17.7 (63.9)	26.1 (79.0)	30.6 (87.1)	37.6 (99.7)	38.3 (100.9)	40.7 (105.3)	37.1 (98.8)	35.8 (96.4)	28.4 (83.1)	19.7 (67.5)	13.3 (55.9)	40.7 (105.3)
Mean daily maximum °C (°F)	−2.5 (27.5)	2.1 (35.8)	9.4 (48.9)	17.9 (64.2)	24.5 (76.1)	28.1 (82.6)	29.6 (85.3)	28.5 (83.3)	23.7 (74.7)	16.1 (61.0)	6.2 (43.2)	−1.5 (29.3)	15.2 (59.3)
Daily mean °C (°F)	−10.4 (13.3)	−6.1 (21.0)	1.6 (34.9)	10.1 (50.2)	16.8 (62.2)	21.0 (69.8)	23.3 (73.9)	21.8 (71.2)	15.8 (60.4)	7.9 (46.2)	−1.5 (29.3)	−9.1 (15.6)	7.6 (45.7)
Mean daily minimum °C (°F)	−16.2 (2.8)	−12.5 (9.5)	−5.4 (22.3)	2.5 (36.5)	9.1 (48.4)	14.7 (58.5)	18.3 (64.9)	16.5 (61.7)	9.7 (49.5)	1.6 (34.9)	−7.0 (19.4)	−14.3 (6.3)	1.4 (34.6)
Record low °C (°F)	−28.7 (−19.7)	−26.1 (−15.0)	−23.6 (−10.5)	−9.3 (15.3)	−1.3 (29.7)	4.5 (40.1)	10.0 (50.0)	6.7 (44.1)	−1.7 (28.9)	−9.6 (14.7)	−23.1 (−9.6)	−26.4 (−15.5)	−28.7 (−19.7)
Average precipitation mm (inches)	1.4 (0.06)	3.7 (0.15)	10.3 (0.41)	22.6 (0.89)	49.1 (1.93)	86.3 (3.40)	143.8 (5.66)	98.6 (3.88)	52.7 (2.07)	30.4 (1.20)	9.5 (0.37)	2.3 (0.09)	510.7 (20.11)
Average precipitation days (≥ 0.1 mm)	1.7	1.9	3.5	5.0	8.2	12.4	13.4	10.8	8.9	5.3	3.2	2.0	76.3
Average snowy days	2.8	3.0	3.5	1.2	0	0	0	0	0	0.7	3.4	3.2	17.8
Average relative humidity (%)	50	45	41	41	48	62	72	73	69	61	57	54	56
Mean monthly sunshine hours	191.5	195.3	234.8	241.5	262.7	225.8	210.5	225.7	216.6	215.5	181.4	180.5	2,581.8
Percentage possible sunshine	64	65	63	60	58	50	46	54	59	64	62	63	59
Source: China Meteorological Administration
