= Huilong, Shaanxi =

Huilong 回龙镇
- Town
- Interactive map of Huilong
- Coordinates: 33°30′52″N 109°09′53″E
- Country: People's Republic of China
- Province: Shaanxi
- Prefecture-level city: Shangluo
- County: Zhen'an
- Village-level divisions: 9 villages
- Elevation: 632 m (2,073 ft)
- Time zone: UTC+8 (China Standard)
- Area code: 0914

Huilong (simplified Chinese: 回龙; traditional Chinese: 回龍; pinyin: Huílóng) is a town of Zhen'an County in southern Shaanxi province, China, situated in a valley of the Qin Mountains along G65 Baotou–Maoming Expressway about 10 kilometres (6.2 mi) north of the county seat as the crow flies. As of 2011, it has nine villages under its administration.
