= Daqinggou =

Daqinggou 大青沟镇
- Town
- Dàqīnggōu Zhèn
- Location in Hebei Location in China
- Coordinates: 41°20′13″N 114°06′49″E
- Country: People's Republic of China
- Province: Hebei
- Prefecture-level city: Zhangjiakou
- County: Shangyi

Area
  - Total: 186.9 km^{2} (72.2 sq mi)

Population (2010)
  - Total: 15,426
  - Density: 82.54/km^{2} (213.8/sq mi)
- Time zone: UTC+8 (China Standard)

Daqinggou (Chinese: 大青沟镇; pinyin: Dàqīnggōu Zhèn) is a town located in Shangyi County, Zhangjiakou, Hebei, China. According to the 2010 census, Daqinggou had a population of 15,426, including 7,706 males and 7,720 females. The population was distributed as follows: 2,643 people aged under 14, 11,106 people aged between 15 and 64, and 1,677 people aged over 65.

== See also ==
- List of township-level divisions of Hebei
