= Dasuji Township =

Dasuji Township 大苏计乡
- Rural Township
- Dàsūjì Xiāng
- Location in Hebei Location in China
- Coordinates: 41°28′53″N 114°09′49″E
- Country: People's Republic of China
- Province: Hebei
- Prefecture-level city: Zhangjiakou
- County: Shangyi

Area
  - Total: 136.3 km^{2} (52.6 sq mi)

Population (2010)
  - Total: 8,326
  - Density: 61.09/km^{2} (158.2/sq mi)
- Time zone: UTC+8 (China Standard)

Dasuji Township (Chinese: 大苏计乡; pinyin: Dàsūjì Xiāng) is a rural township located in Shangyi County, Zhangjiakou, Hebei, China. According to the 2010 census, Dasuji Township had a population of 8,326, including 4,193 males and 4,133 females. The population was distributed as follows: 1,279 people aged under 14, 6,113 people aged between 15 and 64, and 934 people aged over 65.

== See also ==
- List of township-level divisions of Hebei
