= Huangdi Township =

Huangdi Township 荒地乡
- Township
- Location in Hebei
- Coordinates: 41°26′13″N 117°59′52″E
- Country: People's Republic of China
- Province: Hebei
- Prefecture-level city: Chengde
- County: Longhua County
- Time zone: UTC+8 (China Standard)

Huangdi Township (simplified Chinese: 荒地乡; traditional Chinese: 荒地鄉; pinyin: Huāngdì Xiāng) is a township in Longhua County, Hebei, China. As of 2020, it administers the following 17 villages:

- Xi Village (西村)
- Dong Village (东村)
- Dengchang Village (邓厂村)
- Yingtaogoumen Village (樱桃沟门村)
- Ergoumen Village (二沟门村)
- Pingdingshan Village (平顶山村)
- Shaoguoying Village (烧锅营村)
- Yingfang Village (营房村)
- Liangdi Village (梁底村)
- Xiaohougou Village (小后沟村)
- Shangguanying Village (上官营村)
- Dahougou Village (大后沟村)
- Shihugoumen Village (石虎沟门村)
- Maojikou Village (茅吉口村)
- Erdaowan Village (二道湾村)
- Linggoumen Village (岭沟门村)
- Luanjiawan Village (栾家湾村)
