= Shangyi County =

Shangyi County 尚义县
- County
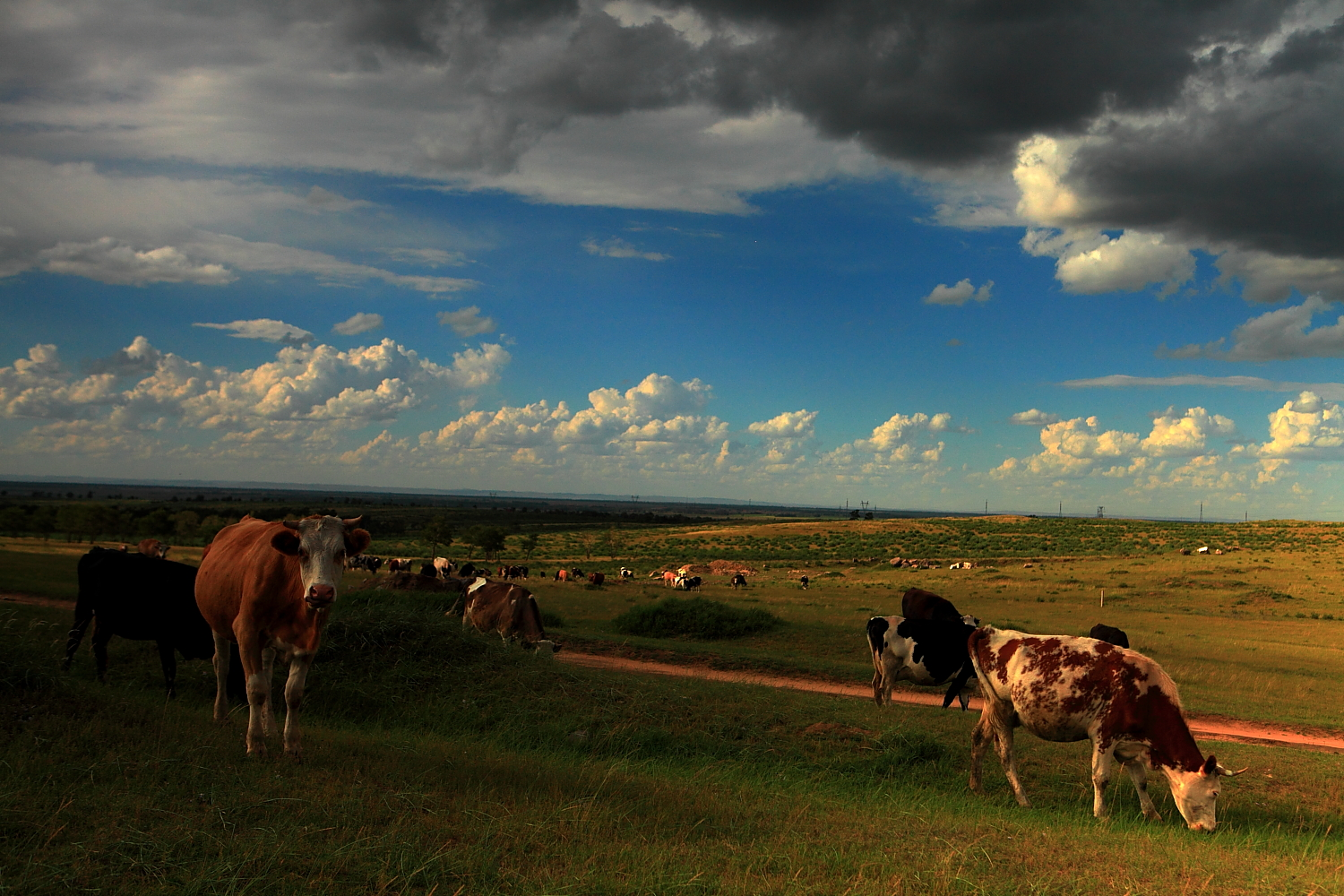

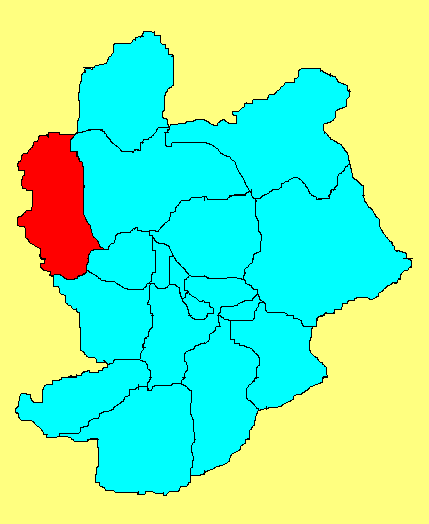
- Location in Zhangjiakou

- Location of the seat in Hebei
- Coordinates: 41°05′N 113°58′E
- Country: People's Republic of China
- Province: Hebei
- Prefecture-level city: Zhangjiakou

Area
  - Total: 2,621 km^{2} (1,012 sq mi)

Population (2020 census)
  - Total: 104,247
  - Density: 39.77/km^{2} (103.0/sq mi)
- Time zone: UTC+8 (China Standard)

Shangyi County (simplified Chinese: 尚义县; traditional Chinese: 尚義縣; pinyin: Shàngyì Xiàn) is a county in the northwest of Hebei province, China. It is under the administration of Zhangjiakou City, and borders Inner Mongolia to the north and west.

== Administrative Divisions ==
Towns:

- Nanhaoqian (南壕堑镇), Daqinggou (大青沟镇), Badaogou (八道沟镇), Hongtuliang (红土梁镇), Xiaosuangou (小蒜沟镇), Sangongdi (三工地镇)

Townships:

- Dayingpan Township (大营盘乡), Dasuji Township (大苏计乡), Shijing Township (石井乡), Kangleng Township (炕塄乡), Qijia Township (七甲乡), Taolizhuang Township (套里庄乡), Jiashihe Township (甲石河乡), Xiamajuan Township (下马圈乡)

== Climate ==
Climate data for Shangyi, elevation 1,377 m (4,518 ft), (1991–2020 normals, extremes 1981–2010)
Month	Jan	Feb	Mar	Apr	May	Jun	Jul	Aug	Sep	Oct	Nov	Dec	Year
Record high °C (°F)	8.0 (46.4)	14.9 (58.8)	21.1 (70.0)	28.4 (83.1)	31.9 (89.4)	35.6 (96.1)	36.7 (98.1)	32.5 (90.5)	33.2 (91.8)	24.7 (76.5)	17.3 (63.1)	10.1 (50.2)	36.7 (98.1)
Mean daily maximum °C (°F)	−6.5 (20.3)	−1.8 (28.8)	5.3 (41.5)	13.7 (56.7)	20.2 (68.4)	24.3 (75.7)	25.8 (78.4)	24.4 (75.9)	19.6 (67.3)	12.0 (53.6)	2.6 (36.7)	−4.9 (23.2)	11.2 (52.2)
Daily mean °C (°F)	−14.3 (6.3)	−10.0 (14.0)	−2.4 (27.7)	6.0 (42.8)	13.0 (55.4)	17.6 (63.7)	19.8 (67.6)	18.0 (64.4)	12.4 (54.3)	4.6 (40.3)	−4.6 (23.7)	−12.0 (10.4)	4.0 (39.2)
Mean daily minimum °C (°F)	−20.4 (−4.7)	−16.6 (2.1)	−9.5 (14.9)	−1.6 (29.1)	5.2 (41.4)	10.7 (51.3)	13.9 (57.0)	12.1 (53.8)	5.9 (42.6)	−1.6 (29.1)	−10.4 (13.3)	−17.8 (0.0)	−2.5 (27.5)
Record low °C (°F)	−34.6 (−30.3)	−31.9 (−25.4)	−26.9 (−16.4)	−13.8 (7.2)	−5.2 (22.6)	−0.5 (31.1)	5.7 (42.3)	3.1 (37.6)	−5.5 (22.1)	−16.0 (3.2)	−25.6 (−14.1)	−30.8 (−23.4)	−34.6 (−30.3)
Average precipitation mm (inches)	2.1 (0.08)	3.6 (0.14)	8.1 (0.32)	19.8 (0.78)	38.4 (1.51)	62.4 (2.46)	116.6 (4.59)	81.7 (3.22)	51.0 (2.01)	23.7 (0.93)	7.8 (0.31)	2.5 (0.10)	417.7 (16.45)
Average precipitation days (≥ 0.1 mm)	3.3	3.4	4.5	5.7	7.9	12.7	13.4	11.5	10.0	6.1	4.3	3.4	86.2
Average snowy days	4.6	4.9	5.7	3.6	0.4	0	0	0	0.2	2.0	5.2	4.8	31.4
Average relative humidity (%)	63	56	48	42	44	57	70	72	66	60	61	62	58
Mean monthly sunshine hours	212.5	207.3	241.1	251.9	276.4	252.5	248.1	251.2	228.2	227.5	199.8	193.8	2,790.3
Percentage possible sunshine	71	68	65	63	61	56	55	60	62	67	68	68	64
Source: China Meteorological Administration
