= Fengyang She Ethnic Township =

Fengyang She Ethnic Township 凤阳畲族乡
- Ethnic Township
- Location in Zhejiang
- Coordinates: 27°20′23″N 120°26′56″E
- Country: China
- Province: Zhejiang
- Prefecture-level city: Wenzhou
- County: Cangnan County

Fengyang She Ethnic Township (simplified Chinese: 凤阳畲族乡; traditional Chinese: 鳳陽畲族鄉; pinyin: Fèngyáng Shē Zú Xiāng) is an ethnic township under the jurisdiction of Cangnan County, Wenzhou City, Zhejiang Province, People's Republic of China.

== Administrative divisions ==
As of 2020, Fengyang She Ethnic Township has jurisdiction over the following village-level administrative divisions: Dingbao Village (顶堡村), Guidun Village (龟墩村), Heshan Village (鹤山村), Lingbian Village (岭边村), and Fengyang Village.
