= Dailing She Ethnic Township =

Dailing 岱岭畲族乡
- Ethnic township
- Location in Zhejiang
- Coordinates: 27°16′41″N 120°25′42″E
- Country: China
- Province: Zhejiang
- Prefecture: Wenzhou
- County: Cangnan

Population
  - Total: 3,283

Dailing is an ethnic township under the jurisdiction of Cangnan County, Wenzhou City, Zhejiang Province, People's Republic of China It is located in Zhejiang Province, in the eastern part of the country, about 330 kilometers south of the provincial capital Hangzhou. The population is 3283 population is 1,562 women and 1,721 men. Children under 15 years make up 16.0%, adults 15–64 years 65%, and older people over 65 years 17.0%.

The average annual rainfall is 1,936 millimeters. The wettest month is June, with an average of 275 mm of rainfall, and the driest is January, with 67 mm of rainfall.

== Administrative divisions ==
Dailing She nationality has jurisdiction over the following village-level administrative divisions:

Donggong Village, Dacuoji Village, Yangjiabian Village, Fuzhang Village, Kengmen Village, Yunzhe Village, Yunshan Village and Fuyuan Village.
