= Zhiping She Ethnic Township =

Zhiping She Ethnic Township 治平畲族乡
- Township
- Location in Fujian Zhiping She Ethnic Township (China)
- Coordinates: 26°2′23″N 116°30′58″E
- Country: People's Republic of China
- Province: Fujian
- Prefecture-level city: Sanming
- County: Ninghua County
- Time zone: UTC+8 (China Standard)

Zhiping She Ethnic Township (simplified Chinese: 治平畲族乡; traditional Chinese: 治平畲族鄉; pinyin: Zhìpíng Shē Zú Xiāng) is an ethnic township for She people in Ninghua County, Fujian, China. As of 2020, it has 12 villages under its administration:

- Zhiping She Ethnic Village
- Dengwu Village (邓屋村)
- Pengfang Village (彭坊村)
- Hubeijiao She Ethnic Village (湖背角畲族村)
- Shefu She Ethnic Village (社福畲族村)
- Pingpu She Ethnic Village (坪埔畲族村)
- Nikeng She Ethnic Village (泥坑畲族村)
- Gaodi She Ethnic Village (高地畲族村)
- Xiaping She Ethnic Village (下坪畲族村)
- Gaofeng She Ethnic Village (高峰畲族村)
- Tian She Ethnic Village (田畲村)
- Guangliang She Ethnic Village (光亮畲族村)
