= Qiu County =

Qiu County 邱县
- County
- Location of the seat in Hebei
- Coordinates: 36°48′40″N 115°11′13″E
- Country: People's Republic of China
- Province: Hebei
- Prefecture-level city: Handan
- Time zone: UTC+8 (China Standard)
- Postal code: 057450

Qiu County or Qiuxian (simplified Chinese: 邱县; traditional Chinese: 邱縣; pinyin: Qiū Xiàn) is a county in the south of Hebei province, China. It is under the administration of Handan City. The county is also the hometown of Hui Chinese martial artist Ma Yongzhen. “Qiu” means "Where there are small mounds". However, the mound has now disappeared.

== Administrative divisions ==
Towns:

- Xinmatou (新马头镇), Qiucheng (邱城镇), Xiangchenggu (香城固镇), Liang'erzhuang (梁二庄镇)

Townships:

- Guchengying Township (古城营乡), Nanxindian Township (南辛店乡), Chencun Hui Ethnic Township (陈村回族乡)

== Climate ==
Climate data for Qiuxian, elevation 39 m (128 ft), (1991–2020 normals, extremes 1981–2010)
Month	Jan	Feb	Mar	Apr	May	Jun	Jul	Aug	Sep	Oct	Nov	Dec	Year
Record high °C (°F)	18.2 (64.8)	24.9 (76.8)	30.3 (86.5)	35.4 (95.7)	41.0 (105.8)	42.5 (108.5)	41.2 (106.2)	37.2 (99.0)	38.2 (100.8)	32.9 (91.2)	27.4 (81.3)	23.5 (74.3)	42.5 (108.5)
Mean daily maximum °C (°F)	3.9 (39.0)	8.3 (46.9)	15.1 (59.2)	21.9 (71.4)	27.7 (81.9)	32.4 (90.3)	32.2 (90.0)	30.6 (87.1)	27.2 (81.0)	21.4 (70.5)	12.6 (54.7)	5.6 (42.1)	19.9 (67.8)
Daily mean °C (°F)	−1.9 (28.6)	2.1 (35.8)	8.6 (47.5)	15.4 (59.7)	21.4 (70.5)	26.1 (79.0)	27.3 (81.1)	25.7 (78.3)	21.1 (70.0)	14.7 (58.5)	6.5 (43.7)	0.0 (32.0)	13.9 (57.1)
Mean daily minimum °C (°F)	−6.1 (21.0)	−2.6 (27.3)	3.2 (37.8)	9.8 (49.6)	15.6 (60.1)	20.6 (69.1)	23.2 (73.8)	21.9 (71.4)	16.5 (61.7)	9.7 (49.5)	1.9 (35.4)	−4.1 (24.6)	9.1 (48.4)
Record low °C (°F)	−21.0 (−5.8)	−17.6 (0.3)	−10.5 (13.1)	−1.9 (28.6)	4.5 (40.1)	10.4 (50.7)	16.5 (61.7)	12.9 (55.2)	3.5 (38.3)	−4.1 (24.6)	−15.8 (3.6)	−19.7 (−3.5)	−21.0 (−5.8)
Average precipitation mm (inches)	3.1 (0.12)	8.1 (0.32)	8.5 (0.33)	28.7 (1.13)	41.1 (1.62)	59.2 (2.33)	143.8 (5.66)	106.1 (4.18)	46.7 (1.84)	27.0 (1.06)	15.6 (0.61)	4.0 (0.16)	491.9 (19.36)
Average precipitation days (≥ 0.1 mm)	1.9	3.3	2.7	5.0	6.5	7.4	10.7	9.2	6.7	5.0	4.2	2.5	65.1
Average snowy days	2.4	2.8	0.9	0.2	0	0	0	0	0	0	0.8	2.1	9.2
Average relative humidity (%)	61	56	53	58	60	60	77	81	74	67	68	64	65
Mean monthly sunshine hours	137	149.6	198.8	221.3	256.5	231.4	191.4	199.5	183.6	178.2	144.2	140.1	2,231.6
Percentage possible sunshine	44	48	53	56	58	53	43	48	50	52	48	47	50
Source: China Meteorological Administration
