= Maoping Hui Ethnic Town =

Maoping 茅坪回族镇
- Ethnic town
- Location in China
- Coordinates: 33°11′10″N 109°27′18″E
- Country: People's Republic of China
- Province: Shaanxi
- Prefecture-level city: Shangluo
- County: Zhen'an County
- Time zone: UTC+8 (China Standard)

Maoping (simplified Chinese: 茅坪回族镇; traditional Chinese: 茅坪回族鎮; pinyin: Máopíng Huí Zú Zhèn) is an ethnic town for Hui people, currently under the administration of Zhen'an County, Shaanxi, China. As of 2018, it has seven villages under its administration.
