= Zhongguan, Hebei =

Zhongguan 中关镇
- Town
- Location in Hebei
- Coordinates: 41°10′44″N 117°57′42″E
- Country: People's Republic of China
- Province: Hebei
- Prefecture-level city: Chengde
- County: Longhua
- Elevation: 443 m (1,453 ft)
- Time zone: UTC+8 (China Standard)
- Area code: 0314

Zhongguan (simplified Chinese: 中关; traditional Chinese: 中關; pinyin: Zhōngguān) is a town of Longhua County in northeastern Hebei province, China, about 22 km (14 mi) due north of Chengde city proper. As of 2018, it has 10 villages under its administration.

== See also ==
- List of township-level divisions of Hebei
