= Baihugou Manchu and Mongol Ethnic Township =

Baihugou Manchu and Mongol Ethnic Township 白虎沟满族蒙古族乡
- Rural Township
- Báihǔgōu Mǎnzú Měnggǔzú Xiāng
- Location in Hebei Location in China
- Coordinates: 41°34′59″N 117°26′37″E
- Country: People's Republic of China
- Province: Hebei
- Prefecture-level city: Chengde
- County: Longhua

Area
  - Total: 92.00 km^{2} (35.52 sq mi)

Population (2010)
  - Total: 5,969
  - Density: 64.88/km^{2} (168.0/sq mi)
- Time zone: UTC+8 (China Standard)

Baihugou Manchu and Mongol Ethnic Township (Chinese: 白虎沟满族蒙古族乡; pinyin: Báihǔgōu Mǎnzú Měnggǔzú Xiāng) is a rural township located in Longhua County, Chengde, Hebei, China. According to the 2010 census, Baihugou Manchu and Mongol Ethnic Township had a population of 5,969, including 3,045 males and 2,924 females. The population was distributed as follows: 1,251 people aged under 14, 4,094 people aged between 15 and 64, and 624 people aged over 65.

== See also ==
- List of township-level divisions of Hebei
