= Qijia, Longhua County =

Coordinates: 41°27′06″N 118°05′41″E

Qijia
- Town

Chinese transcription(s)
  - Chinese: 七家镇
  - Pinyin: Qījiā Zhèn
- Interactive map of Qijia
- Country: China
- Province: Hebei
- Prefecture: Chengde
- County: Longhua
- Time zone: UTC+8 (China Standard Time)

Qijia (Chinese: 七家镇; pinyin: Qījiā Zhèn) is a township-level division situated in Longhua County, Chengde, Hebei, China.

== See also ==
- List of township-level divisions of Hebei
