= Chencun Hui Ethnic Township =

Chencun Hui Ethnic Township 陈村回族乡
- Rural Township
- Chéncūn Huízú Xiāng
- Location in Hebei Location in China
- Coordinates: 36°44′13″N 115°08′06″E
- Country: People's Republic of China
- Province: Hebei
- Prefecture-level city: Handan
- County: Qiu

Area
  - Total: 9.074 km^{2} (3.503 sq mi)

Population (2010)
  - Total: 6,227
  - Density: 686.2/km^{2} (1,777/sq mi)
- Time zone: UTC+8 (China Standard)

Chencun Hui Ethnic Township (Chinese: 陈村回族乡; pinyin: Chéncūn Huízú Xiāng) is a rural township located in Qiu County, Handan, Hebei, China. According to the 2010 census, Chencun Hui Ethnic Township had a population of 6,227, including 3,156 males and 3,071 females. The population was distributed as follows: 1,562 people aged under 14, 4,223 people aged between 15 and 64, and 442 people aged over 65.

== See also ==
- List of township-level divisions of Hebei
