= Feidong County =

Coordinates: 32°00′58″N 117°35′05″E

Feidong 肥东县 Feitung
- County
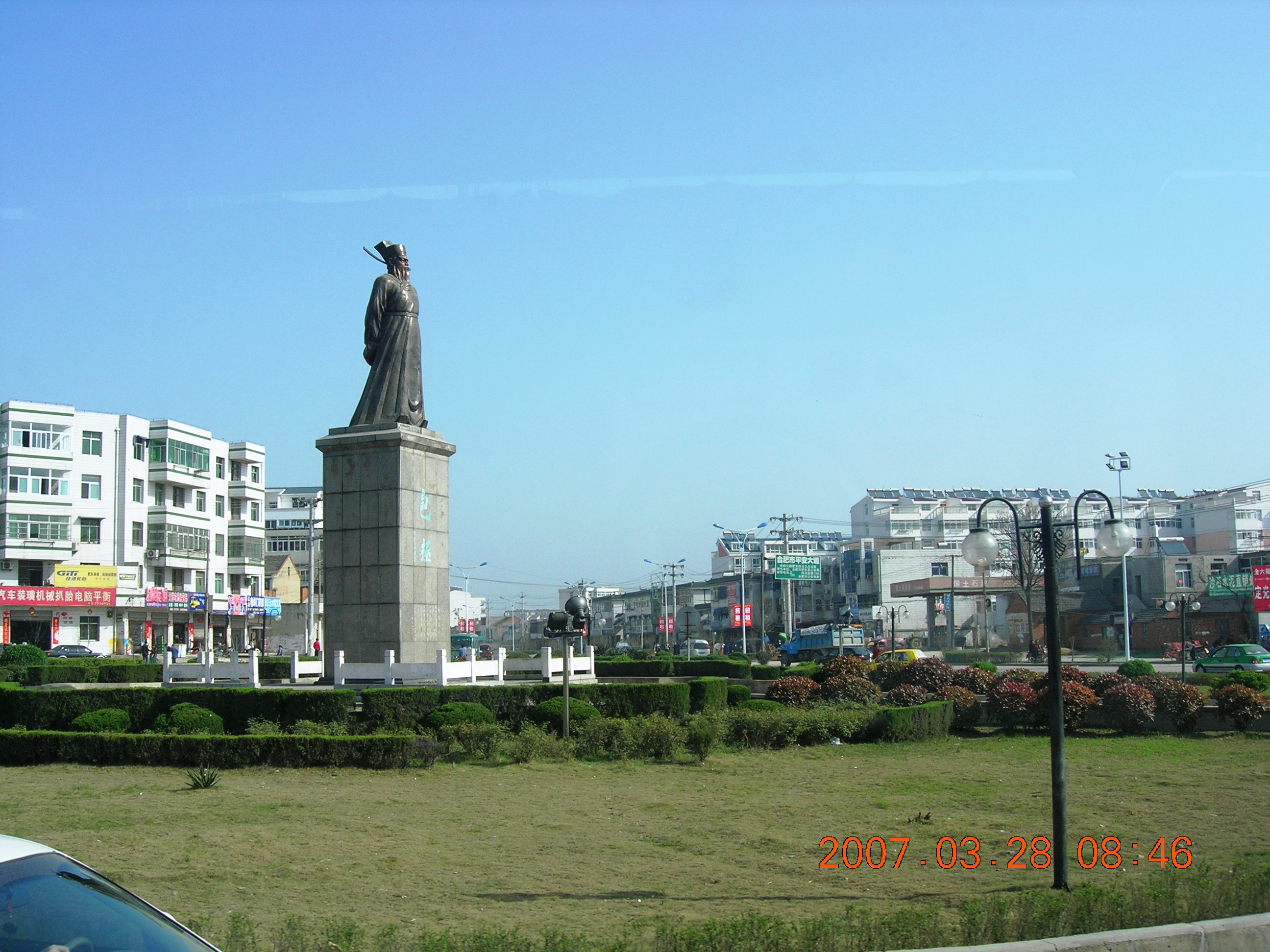

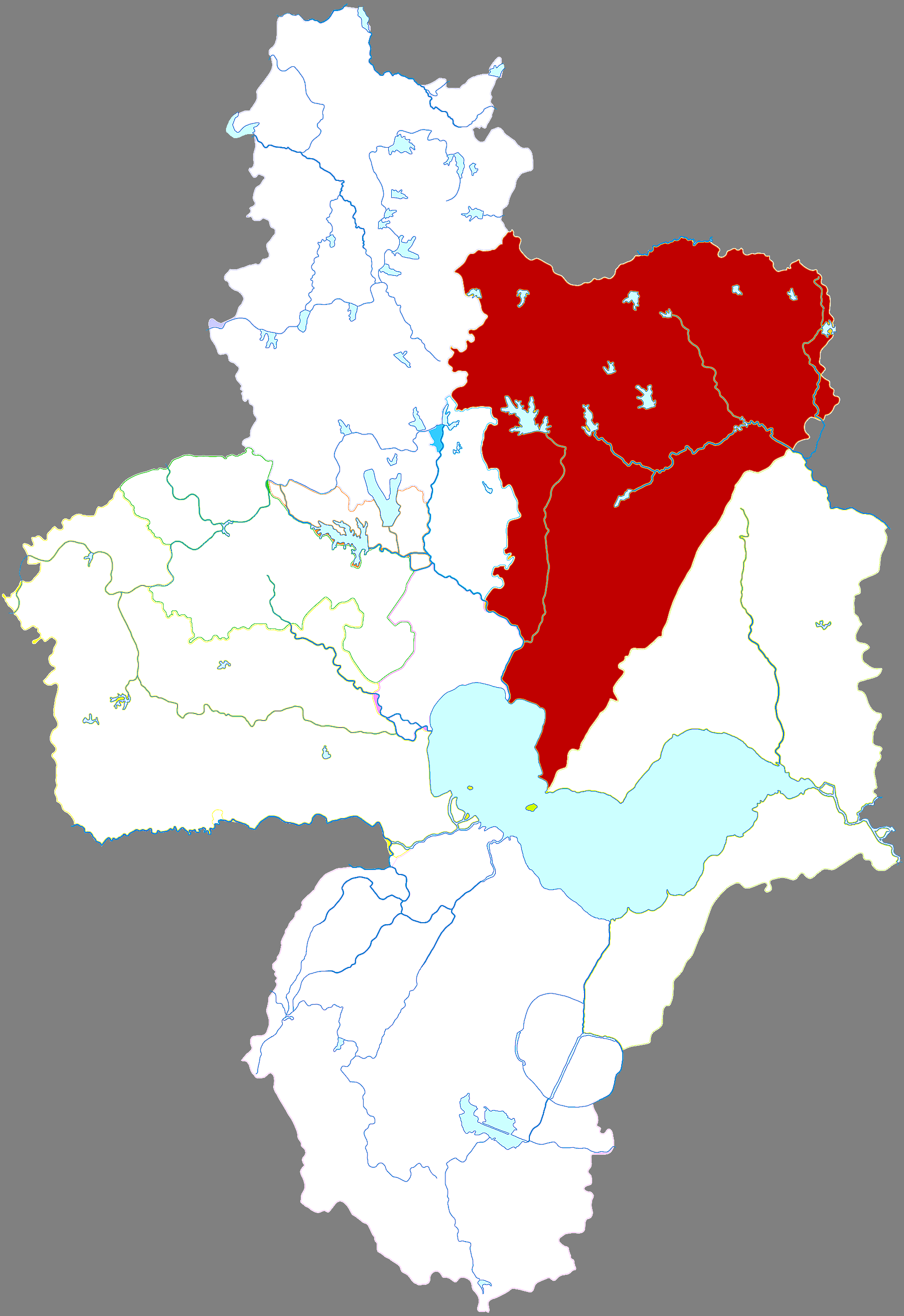
- Feidong in Hefei

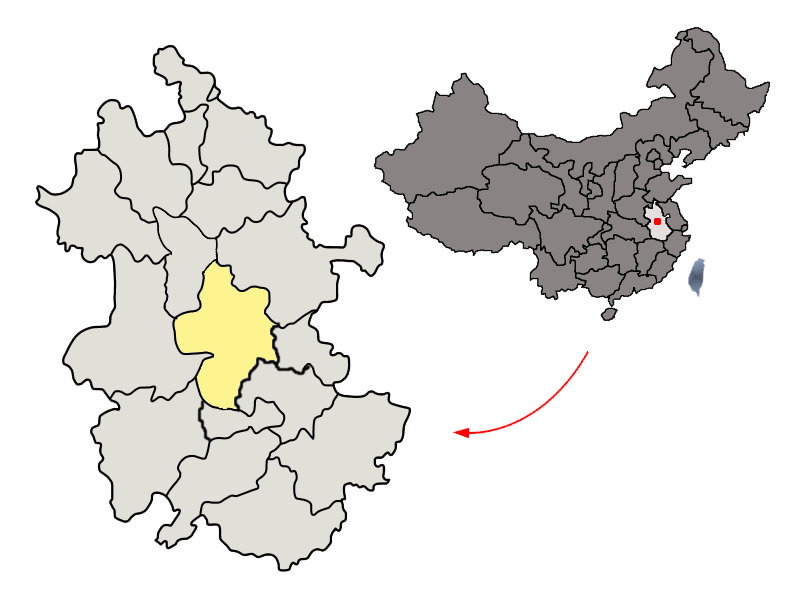
- Hefei in Anhui
- Country: China
- Province: Anhui
- Prefecture-level city: Hefei
- County seat: Dianbu Town

Area
  - Total: 2,215.53 km^{2} (855.42 sq mi)

Population (2020)
  - Total: 884,792
  - Density: 399.359/km^{2} (1,034.34/sq mi)
- Time zone: UTC+8 (China Standard)
- Postal code: 231600
- Website: www.feidong.gov.cn

Feidong County (simplified Chinese: 肥东县; traditional Chinese: 肥東縣; pinyin: Féidōng Xiàn) is a county of Anhui Province, East China, under the administration of the prefecture-level city of Hefei, the capital of Anhui. The county has a surface of 2,215.53 km^{2} (855.42 sq mi) and a population of 861,960 inhabitants. It contains 18 towns and 2 development zones.

== Administrative divisions ==
Feidong County is divided to 12 towns, 5 townships and 1 ethnic township.

Towns

- Dianbu (店埠镇)
- Zuozhen (撮镇镇)
- Liangyuan (梁园镇)
- Qiatouji (桥头集镇)
- Changlinhe (长临河镇)
- Shitang (石塘镇)
- Gucheng (古城镇)
- Badou (八斗镇)
- Yuantuan (元疃镇)
- Bailong (白龙镇)
- Baogong (包公镇)
- Chenji (陈集镇)

Townships

- Zhongxing Township (众兴乡)
- Zhangji Township (张集乡)
- Mahu Township (马湖乡)
- Chenji Township (陈集乡)
- Xiangdao Township (响导乡)
- Yangdian Township (杨店乡)

Ethnic Townships

- Paifang Hui and Manchu Ethnic Township (牌坊回族满族乡)

== Climate ==
Climate data for Feidong, elevation 18 m (59 ft), (1991–2020 normals, extremes 1981–present)
Month	Jan	Feb	Mar	Apr	May	Jun	Jul	Aug	Sep	Oct	Nov	Dec	Year
Record high °C (°F)	22.2 (72.0)	26.0 (78.8)	32.4 (90.3)	32.7 (90.9)	35.2 (95.4)	37.5 (99.5)	40.0 (104.0)	38.8 (101.8)	38.5 (101.3)	34.8 (94.6)	28.3 (82.9)	22.3 (72.1)	40.0 (104.0)
Mean daily maximum °C (°F)	7.2 (45.0)	10.2 (50.4)	15.3 (59.5)	21.7 (71.1)	27.0 (80.6)	29.5 (85.1)	32.3 (90.1)	31.8 (89.2)	28.1 (82.6)	23.0 (73.4)	16.4 (61.5)	9.8 (49.6)	21.0 (69.8)
Daily mean °C (°F)	3.0 (37.4)	5.6 (42.1)	10.4 (50.7)	16.6 (61.9)	22.0 (71.6)	25.5 (77.9)	28.4 (83.1)	27.7 (81.9)	23.3 (73.9)	17.8 (64.0)	11.3 (52.3)	5.2 (41.4)	16.4 (61.5)
Mean daily minimum °C (°F)	−0.2 (31.6)	2.0 (35.6)	6.4 (43.5)	12.1 (53.8)	17.5 (63.5)	21.8 (71.2)	25.2 (77.4)	24.5 (76.1)	19.7 (67.5)	13.7 (56.7)	7.2 (45.0)	1.6 (34.9)	12.6 (54.7)
Record low °C (°F)	−15.9 (3.4)	−13.7 (7.3)	−3.5 (25.7)	−0.2 (31.6)	7.8 (46.0)	12.7 (54.9)	18.6 (65.5)	15.8 (60.4)	9.8 (49.6)	1.1 (34.0)	−5.8 (21.6)	−17.1 (1.2)	−17.1 (1.2)
Average precipitation mm (inches)	45.9 (1.81)	50.9 (2.00)	74.8 (2.94)	77.9 (3.07)	90.4 (3.56)	143.3 (5.64)	181.9 (7.16)	143.4 (5.65)	72.6 (2.86)	49.4 (1.94)	55.5 (2.19)	32.6 (1.28)	1,018.6 (40.1)
Average precipitation days (≥ 0.1 mm)	8.8	8.9	10.5	10.0	10.4	10.6	11.6	11.9	8.0	8.0	8.0	6.9	113.6
Average snowy days	4.3	2.4	0.9	0	0	0	0	0	0	0	0.6	1.4	9.6
Average relative humidity (%)	75	75	71	70	71	77	80	82	79	74	74	73	75
Mean monthly sunshine hours	102.9	109.8	153.0	178.7	178.7	152.9	182.6	172.9	142.7	152.9	136.5	122.6	1,786.2
Percentage possible sunshine	32	35	41	46	42	36	42	42	39	44	43	39	40
Source: China Meteorological Administration all-time January high

== Transport ==
- China National Highway 312

The urban area is served by Feidong railway station. Changlinhe railway station is also situated here.

== Notable people ==
- Bao Zheng (999–1062), Northern Song dynasty bureaucrat and judge whose name has become synonymous with judicial wisdom and uprightness.
- Li Hongzhang (1823–1901), prominent late Qing dynasty bureaucrat and diplomat.
- Wu Bangguo (1941–), former chairman of the Standing Committee of the National People's Congress.
- Zhang Jinfu (1903–2015), former Minister of Finance and Director of the State Economic Commission.
