= Beanstalk International Bilingual School =

Series of international schools based in Beijing, China

Coordinates: 40.0551°N 116.5325°E

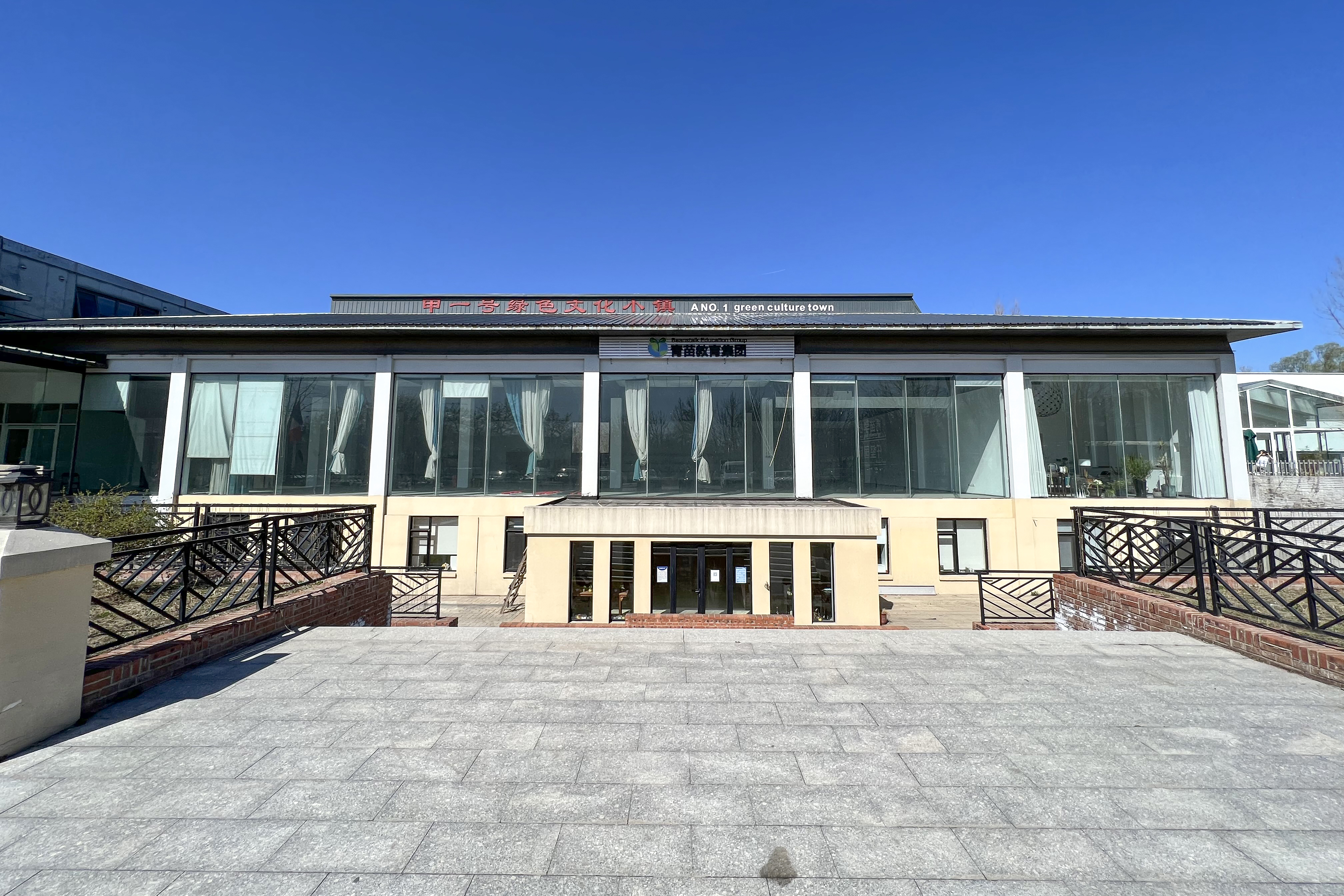
Headquarters of Beanstalk Education Group in Sunhe, Beijing

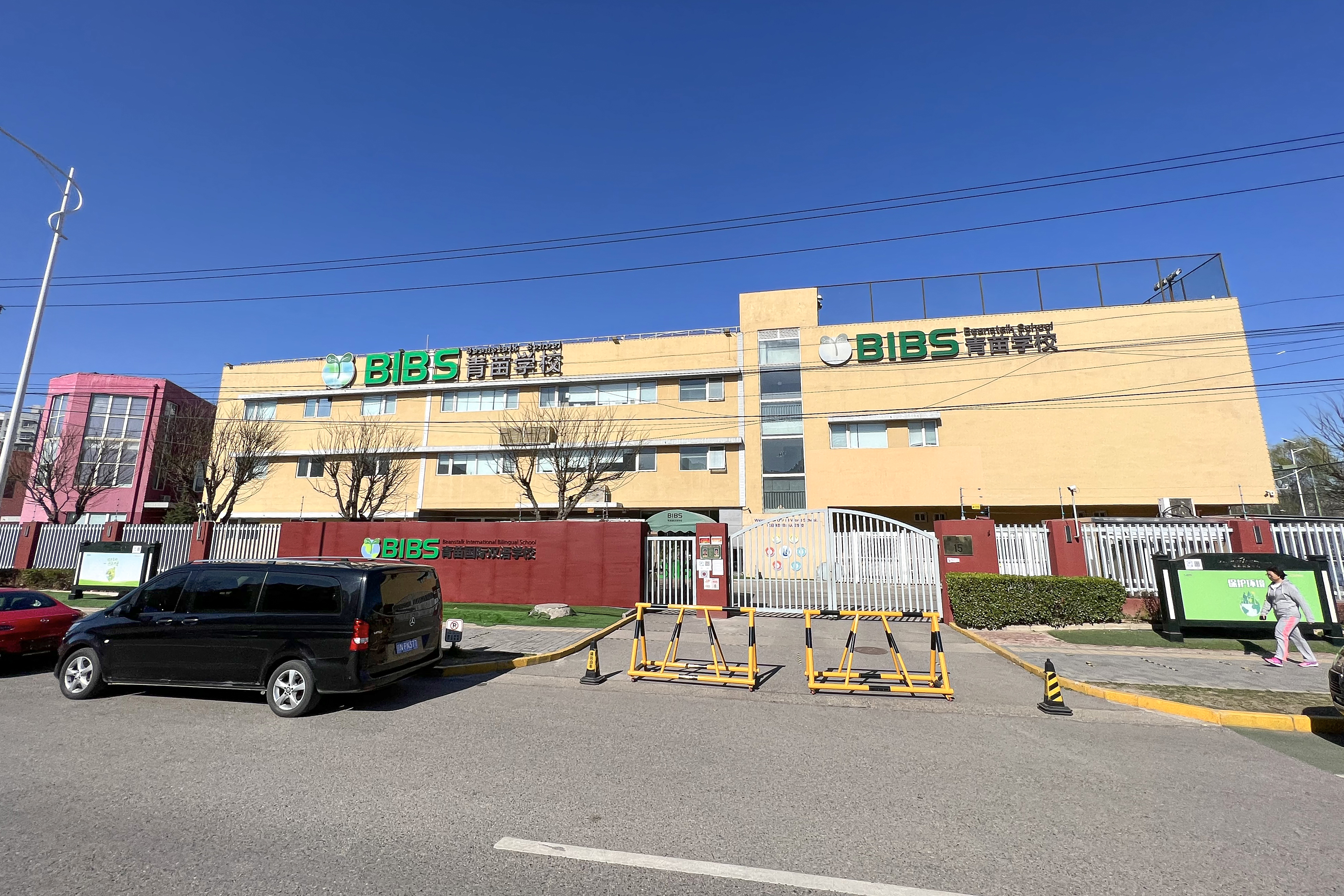
BIBS Shunyi Tianzhu Campus

Beanstalk International Bilingual School (BIBS; Chinese: 青苗国际双语学校) is a K-12 and Kindergarten international school system in Beijing, China. It is managed by the Beanstalk Education Group (青苗教育集团), and was first established as a kindergarten in 1993.

- BIBS Shunyi Campus (K-12) in Tianzhu Town, Shunyi District
- BIBS Upper East Side (UES) Elementary School (K-6) in Chaoyang District
- BIBS Dongrun Campus (K-6) in Chaoyang District
