= Dianbu, Anhui =

Dianbu 店埠镇
- Town
- Interactive map of Dianbu
- Coordinates: 31°53′18″N 117°27′39″E
- Country: People's Republic of China
- Province: Anhui
- Prefecture-level city: Hefei
- County: Feidong
- Elevation: 19 m (62 ft)

Population (2010)
  - Total: 225,808
- Time zone: UTC+8 (China Standard)
- Postal code: 231600
- Area code: 0551

Dianbu (Chinese: 店埠; pinyin: Diànbù) is a town in and the seat of Feidong County in the eastern suburbs of Hefei, the capital of Anhui province, People's Republic of China. As of 2011, it has 14 residential communities (社区) and 16 villages under its administration.

== See also ==
- List of township-level divisions of Anhui
