= Qijia Township, Hebei =

Coordinates: 41°10′16″N 114°02′17″E

Qijia Township
- Subdistrict

Chinese transcription(s)
  - Chinese: 七甲乡
  - Pinyin: Qījiǎ Xiāng
- Interactive map of Qijia Township
- Country: China
- Province: Hebei
- Prefecture: Zhangjiakou
- County: Shangyi
- Time zone: UTC+8 (China Standard Time)

Qijia Township (Chinese: 七甲乡; pinyin: Qījiǎ Xiāng) is a township-level division situated in Shangyi County, Zhangjiakou, Hebei, China.

== See also ==
- List of township-level divisions of Hebei
