= Badaying Mongol Ethnic Township =

Badaying Mongol Ethnic Township 八达营蒙古族乡
- Rural Township
- Bādáyíng Měnggǔzú Xiāng
- Location in Hebei Location in China
- Coordinates: 41°24′43″N 117°33′31″E
- Country: People's Republic of China
- Province: Hebei
- Prefecture-level city: Chengde
- County: Longhua

Area
  - Total: 188.2 km^{2} (72.7 sq mi)

Population (2010)
  - Total: 10,057
  - Density: 53.45/km^{2} (138.4/sq mi)
- Time zone: UTC+8 (China Standard)

Badaying Mongol Ethnic Township (Chinese: 八达营蒙古族乡; pinyin: Bādáyíng Měnggǔzú Xiāng) is a rural township located in Longhua County, Chengde, Hebei, China. According to the 2010 census, Badaying Mongol Ethnic Township had a population of 10,057, including 5,173 males and 4,884 females. The population was distributed as follows: 2,063 people aged under 14, 6,830 people aged between 15 and 64, and 1,164 people aged over 65.

== See also ==
- List of township-level divisions of Hebei
