= List of administrative divisions of Shaanxi =

Shaanxi Province
- Province
- Capital: Xi'an

Prefecture-level divisions
- Sub-provincial cities: 1
- Prefectural cities: 9

County level divisions
- County cities: 6
- Counties: 71
- Districts: 30

Township level divisions
- Towns: 917
- Townships: 680
- Subdistricts: 148

Villages level divisions
- Communities: 2,631
- Administrative villages: 19,936

Shaanxi, a province of the People's Republic of China, is made up of the following administrative divisions.

== Administrative divisions ==
These administrative divisions are explained in greater detail at Administrative divisions of the People's Republic of China. The following table lists only the prefecture-level and county-level divisions of Shaanxi.

Prefecture level	County level				
Prefecture level	Name	Chinese	Hanyu Pinyin	Division code	
Xi'an city 西安市; Xī'ān Shì (capital – sub-provincial) (6101 / SIA)	Xincheng District	新城区	Xīnchéng Qū	610102	XCK
Xi'an city 西安市; Xī'ān Shì (capital – sub-provincial) (6101 / SIA)	Beilin District	碑林区	Bēilín Qū	610103	BLQ
Xi'an city 西安市; Xī'ān Shì (capital – sub-provincial) (6101 / SIA)	Lianhu District	莲湖区	Liánhú Qū	610104	LHU
Xi'an city 西安市; Xī'ān Shì (capital – sub-provincial) (6101 / SIA)	Baqiao District	灞桥区	Bàqiáo Qū	610111	BQQ
Xi'an city 西安市; Xī'ān Shì (capital – sub-provincial) (6101 / SIA)	Weiyang District	未央区	Wèiyāng Qū	610112	WYA
Xi'an city 西安市; Xī'ān Shì (capital – sub-provincial) (6101 / SIA)	Yanta District	雁塔区	Yàntǎ Qū	610113	YTA
Xi'an city 西安市; Xī'ān Shì (capital – sub-provincial) (6101 / SIA)	Yanliang District	阎良区	Yánliáng Qū	610114	YLQ
Xi'an city 西安市; Xī'ān Shì (capital – sub-provincial) (6101 / SIA)	Lintong District	临潼区	Líntóng Qū	610115	LTG
Xi'an city 西安市; Xī'ān Shì (capital – sub-provincial) (6101 / SIA)	Chang'an District	长安区	Cháng'ān Qū	610116	CAU
Xi'an city 西安市; Xī'ān Shì (capital – sub-provincial) (6101 / SIA)	Gaoling District	高陵区	Gāolíng Qū	610117	GLI
Xi'an city 西安市; Xī'ān Shì (capital – sub-provincial) (6101 / SIA)	Huyi District	鄠邑区	Hùyì Qū	610118	HYD
Xi'an city 西安市; Xī'ān Shì (capital – sub-provincial) (6101 / SIA)	Lantian County	蓝田县	Lántián Xiàn	610122	LNT
Xi'an city 西安市; Xī'ān Shì (capital – sub-provincial) (6101 / SIA)	Zhouzhi County	周至县	Zhōuzhì Xiàn	610124	ZOZ
Tongchuan city 铜川市; Tóngchuān Shì (6102 / TCN)	Wangyi District	王益区	Wángyì Qū	610202	WAY
Tongchuan city 铜川市; Tóngchuān Shì (6102 / TCN)	Yintai District	印台区	Yìntái Qū	610203	YIT
Tongchuan city 铜川市; Tóngchuān Shì (6102 / TCN)	Yaozhou District	耀州区	Yàozhōu Qū	610204	YAO
Tongchuan city 铜川市; Tóngchuān Shì (6102 / TCN)	Yijun County	宜君县	Yíjūn Xiàn	610222	YJU
Baoji city 宝鸡市; Bǎojī Shì (6103 / BJI)	Weibin District	渭滨区	Wèibīn Qū	610302	WBQ
Baoji city 宝鸡市; Bǎojī Shì (6103 / BJI)	Jintai District	金台区	Jīntái Qū	610303	JTQ
Baoji city 宝鸡市; Bǎojī Shì (6103 / BJI)	Chencang District	陈仓区	Chéncāng Qū	610304	CCU
Baoji city 宝鸡市; Bǎojī Shì (6103 / BJI)	Fengxiang District	凤翔区	Fèngxiáng Qū	610305	FXG
Baoji city 宝鸡市; Bǎojī Shì (6103 / BJI)	Qishan County	岐山县	Qíshān Xiàn	610323	QIS
Baoji city 宝鸡市; Bǎojī Shì (6103 / BJI)	Fufeng County	扶风县	Fúfēng Xiàn	610324	FFG
Baoji city 宝鸡市; Bǎojī Shì (6103 / BJI)	Meixian County (Note: Official name registered by the Ministry of Civil Affairs.)	眉县	Méixiàn	610326	MEI
Baoji city 宝鸡市; Bǎojī Shì (6103 / BJI)	Longxian County	陇县	Lǒngxiàn	610327	LON
Baoji city 宝鸡市; Bǎojī Shì (6103 / BJI)	Qianyang County	千阳县	Qiānyáng Xiàn	610328	QNY
Baoji city 宝鸡市; Bǎojī Shì (6103 / BJI)	Linyou County	麟游县	Línyóu Xiàn	610329	LYP
Baoji city 宝鸡市; Bǎojī Shì (6103 / BJI)	Fengxian County	凤县	Fèngxiàn	610330	FEG
Baoji city 宝鸡市; Bǎojī Shì (6103 / BJI)	Taibai County	太白县	Tàibái Xiàn	610331	TBA
Xianyang city 咸阳市; Xiányáng Shì (6104 / XYS)	Qindu District	秦都区	Qíndū Qū	610402	QDU
Xianyang city 咸阳市; Xiányáng Shì (6104 / XYS)	Yangling District	杨陵区	Yánglíng Qū	610403	YGL
Xianyang city 咸阳市; Xiányáng Shì (6104 / XYS)	Weicheng District	渭城区	Wèichéng Qū	610404	WIC
Xianyang city 咸阳市; Xiányáng Shì (6104 / XYS)	Sanyuan County	三原县	Sānyuán Xiàn	610422	SYN
Xianyang city 咸阳市; Xiányáng Shì (6104 / XYS)	Jingyang County	泾阳县	Jīngyáng Xiàn	610423	JGY
Xianyang city 咸阳市; Xiányáng Shì (6104 / XYS)	Qianxian County	乾县	Qiánxiàn	610424	QIA
Xianyang city 咸阳市; Xiányáng Shì (6104 / XYS)	Liquan County	礼泉县	Lǐquán Xiàn	610425	LIQ
Xianyang city 咸阳市; Xiányáng Shì (6104 / XYS)	Yongshou County	永寿县	Yǒngshòu Xiàn	610426	YSH
Xianyang city 咸阳市; Xiányáng Shì (6104 / XYS)	Changwu County	长武县	Chángwǔ Xiàn	610428	CWU
Xianyang city 咸阳市; Xiányáng Shì (6104 / XYS)	Xunyi County	旬邑县	Xúnyì Xiàn	610429	XNY
Xianyang city 咸阳市; Xiányáng Shì (6104 / XYS)	Chunhua County	淳化县	Chúnhuà Xiàn	610430	CHU
Xianyang city 咸阳市; Xiányáng Shì (6104 / XYS)	Wugong County	武功县	Wǔgōng Xiàn	610431	WGG
Xianyang city 咸阳市; Xiányáng Shì (6104 / XYS)	Xingping city	兴平市	Xīngpíng Shì	610481	XPG
Xianyang city 咸阳市; Xiányáng Shì (6104 / XYS)	Binzhou city	彬州市	Bīnzhōu Shì	610482	
Weinan city 渭南市; Wèinán Shì (6105 / WNA)	Linwei District	临渭区	Línwèi Qū	610502	LWE
Weinan city 渭南市; Wèinán Shì (6105 / WNA)	Huazhou District	华州区	Huàzhōu Qū	610503	HZL
Weinan city 渭南市; Wèinán Shì (6105 / WNA)	Tongguan County	潼关县	Tóngguān Xiàn	610522	TGN
Weinan city 渭南市; Wèinán Shì (6105 / WNA)	Dali County	大荔县	Dàlì Xiàn	610523	DAL
Weinan city 渭南市; Wèinán Shì (6105 / WNA)	Heyang County	合阳县	Héyáng Xiàn	610524	HYK
Weinan city 渭南市; Wèinán Shì (6105 / WNA)	Chengcheng County	澄城县	Chéngchéng Xiàn	610525	CCG
Weinan city 渭南市; Wèinán Shì (6105 / WNA)	Pucheng County	蒲城县	Púchéng Xiàn	610526	PUC
Weinan city 渭南市; Wèinán Shì (6105 / WNA)	Baishui County	白水县	Báishuǐ Xiàn	610527	BSU
Weinan city 渭南市; Wèinán Shì (6105 / WNA)	Fuping County	富平县	Fùpíng Xiàn	610528	FPX
Weinan city 渭南市; Wèinán Shì (6105 / WNA)	Hancheng city	韩城市	Hánchéng Shì	610581	HCE
Weinan city 渭南市; Wèinán Shì (6105 / WNA)	Huayin city	华阴市	Huàyīn Shì	610582	HYI
Yan'an city 延安市; Yán'ān Shì (6106 / YNA)	Baota District	宝塔区	Bǎotǎ Qū	610602	BTA
Yan'an city 延安市; Yán'ān Shì (6106 / YNA)	Ansai District	安塞区	Ānsài Qū	610603	ASI
Yan'an city 延安市; Yán'ān Shì (6106 / YNA)	Yanchang County	延长县	Yáncháng Xiàn	610621	YCA
Yan'an city 延安市; Yán'ān Shì (6106 / YNA)	Yanchuan County	延川县	Yánchuān Xiàn	610622	YCT
Yan'an city 延安市; Yán'ān Shì (6106 / YNA)	Zhidan County	志丹县	Zhìdān Xiàn	610625	ZDN
Yan'an city 延安市; Yán'ān Shì (6106 / YNA)	Wuqi County	吴起县	Wúqǐ Xiàn	610626	WQI
Yan'an city 延安市; Yán'ān Shì (6106 / YNA)	Ganquan County	甘泉县	Gānquán Xiàn	610627	GQN
Yan'an city 延安市; Yán'ān Shì (6106 / YNA)	Fuxian County	富县	Fùxiàn	610628	FUX
Yan'an city 延安市; Yán'ān Shì (6106 / YNA)	Luochuan County	洛川县	Luòchuān Xiàn	610629	LCW
Yan'an city 延安市; Yán'ān Shì (6106 / YNA)	Yichuan County	宜川县	Yíchuān Xiàn	610630	YIC
Yan'an city 延安市; Yán'ān Shì (6106 / YNA)	Huanglong County	黄龙县	Huánglóng Xiàn	610631	HGL
Yan'an city 延安市; Yán'ān Shì (6106 / YNA)	Huangling County	黄陵县	Huánglíng Xiàn	610632	HLG
Yan'an city 延安市; Yán'ān Shì (6106 / YNA)	Zichang city	子长市	Zǐcháng shì	610681	
Hanzhong city 汉中市; Hànzhōng Shì (6107 / HZJ)	Hantai District	汉台区	Hàntái Qū	610702	HTQ
Hanzhong city 汉中市; Hànzhōng Shì (6107 / HZJ)	Nanzheng District	南郑区	Nánzhèng Qū	610703	
Hanzhong city 汉中市; Hànzhōng Shì (6107 / HZJ)	Chenggu County	城固县	Chénggù Xiàn	610722	CGU
Hanzhong city 汉中市; Hànzhōng Shì (6107 / HZJ)	Yangxian County	洋县	Yángxiàn	610723	YGX
Hanzhong city 汉中市; Hànzhōng Shì (6107 / HZJ)	Xixiang County	西乡县	Xīxiāng Xiàn	610724	XXA
Hanzhong city 汉中市; Hànzhōng Shì (6107 / HZJ)	Mianxian County	勉县	Miǎnxiàn	610725	MIA
Hanzhong city 汉中市; Hànzhōng Shì (6107 / HZJ)	Ningqiang County	宁强县	Níngqiáng Xiàn	610726	NQG
Hanzhong city 汉中市; Hànzhōng Shì (6107 / HZJ)	Lueyang County	略阳县	Lüèyáng Xiàn	610727	LYC
Hanzhong city 汉中市; Hànzhōng Shì (6107 / HZJ)	Zhenba County	镇巴县	Zhènbā Xiàn	610728	ZBA
Hanzhong city 汉中市; Hànzhōng Shì (6107 / HZJ)	Liuba County	留坝县	Liúbà Xiàn	610729	LBA
Hanzhong city 汉中市; Hànzhōng Shì (6107 / HZJ)	Foping County	佛坪县	Fópíng Xiàn	610730	FPG
Yulin city 榆林市; Yúlín Shì (6108 / YLN)	Yuyang District	榆阳区	Yúyáng Qū	610802	YNU
Yulin city 榆林市; Yúlín Shì (6108 / YLN)	Hengshan District	横山区	Héngshān Qū	610803	HSB
Yulin city 榆林市; Yúlín Shì (6108 / YLN)	Fugu County	府谷县	Fǔgǔ Xiàn	610822	FGU
Yulin city 榆林市; Yúlín Shì (6108 / YLN)	Jingbian County	靖边县	Jìngbiān Xiàn	610824	JBN
Yulin city 榆林市; Yúlín Shì (6108 / YLN)	Dingbian County	定边县	Dìngbiān Xiàn	610825	DBN
Yulin city 榆林市; Yúlín Shì (6108 / YLN)	Suide County	绥德县	Suídé Xiàn	610826	SDE
Yulin city 榆林市; Yúlín Shì (6108 / YLN)	Mizhi County	米脂县	Mǐzhī Xiàn	610827	MZH
Yulin city 榆林市; Yúlín Shì (6108 / YLN)	Jiaxian County	佳县	Jiāxiàn	610828	JXN
Yulin city 榆林市; Yúlín Shì (6108 / YLN)	Wubu County	吴堡县	Wúbǔ Xiàn	610829	WBU
Yulin city 榆林市; Yúlín Shì (6108 / YLN)	Qingjian County	清涧县	Qīngjiàn Xiàn	610830	QJN
Yulin city 榆林市; Yúlín Shì (6108 / YLN)	Zizhou County	子洲县	Zǐzhōu Xiàn	610831	ZZH
Yulin city 榆林市; Yúlín Shì (6108 / YLN)	Shenmu city	神木市	Shénmù Shì	610881	SMA
Ankang city 安康市; Ānkāng Shì (6109 / ANK)	Hanbin District	汉滨区	Hànbīn Qū	610902	HBU
Ankang city 安康市; Ānkāng Shì (6109 / ANK)	Hanyin County	汉阴县	Hànyīn Xiàn	610921	HYY
Ankang city 安康市; Ānkāng Shì (6109 / ANK)	Shiquan County	石泉县	Shíquán Xiàn	610922	SQN
Ankang city 安康市; Ānkāng Shì (6109 / ANK)	Ningshan County	宁陕县	Níngshǎn Xiàn	610923	NGS
Ankang city 安康市; Ānkāng Shì (6109 / ANK)	Ziyang County	紫阳县	Zǐyáng Xiàn	610924	ZYG
Ankang city 安康市; Ānkāng Shì (6109 / ANK)	Langao County	岚皋县	Lángāo Xiàn	610925	LNG
Ankang city 安康市; Ānkāng Shì (6109 / ANK)	Pingli County	平利县	Pínglì Xiàn	610926	PLX
Ankang city 安康市; Ānkāng Shì (6109 / ANK)	Zhenping County	镇坪县	Zhènpíng Xiàn	610927	ZNP
Ankang city 安康市; Ānkāng Shì (6109 / ANK)	Baihe County	白河县	Báihé Xiàn	610929	BHE
Ankang city 安康市; Ānkāng Shì (6109 / ANK)	Xunyang City	旬阳市	Xúnyáng Shì	610981	XYS
Shangluo city 商洛市; Shāngluò Shì (6110 / SLH)	Shangzhou District	商州区	Shāngzhōu Qū	611002	SZO
Shangluo city 商洛市; Shāngluò Shì (6110 / SLH)	Luonan County	洛南县	Luònán Xiàn	611021	LNK
Shangluo city 商洛市; Shāngluò Shì (6110 / SLH)	Danfeng County	丹凤县	Dānfèng Xiàn	611022	DNF
Shangluo city 商洛市; Shāngluò Shì (6110 / SLH)	Shangnan County	商南县	Shāngnán Xiàn	611023	SNN
Shangluo city 商洛市; Shāngluò Shì (6110 / SLH)	Shanyang County	山阳县	Shānyáng Xiàn	611024	SNY
Shangluo city 商洛市; Shāngluò Shì (6110 / SLH)	Zhen'an County	镇安县	Zhèn'ān Xiàn	611025	ZNA
Shangluo city 商洛市; Shāngluò Shì (6110 / SLH)	Zhashui County	柞水县	Zhàshuǐ Xiàn	611026	ZSU

== Recent changes in administrative divisions ==
Date	Before	After	Note	Reference
1980-02-02	Jiao District, Xi'an	Weiyang District	merged into	
1980-02-02	Jiao District, Xi'an	Yanta District	merged into	
1980-02-02	Jiao District, Xi'an	Baqiao District	merged into	
1980-04-05	Tongchuan (P-City) city district	Cheng District, Tongchuang	established	
1980-04-05	Tongchuan (P-City) city district	Jiao District, Tongchuang	established	
1980-05-12	parts of Xi'an (P-City)	Weinan Prefecture	transferred	
1980-05-12	↳ Lintong County	↳ Lintong County	transferred	
1980-07-18	Hanzhong County	Hanzhong (PC-City)	reorganized	
1982-04-05	parts of Fufeng County	Yangling District	established	
1983-01-18	all Province-controlled city (P-City) → Prefecture-level city (PL-City)			Civil Affairs announcement
1983-01-18	all Prefecture-controlled city (PC-City) → County-level city (CL-City)			Civil Affairs announcement
1983-09-09	parts of Weinan Prefecture	Xi'an (P-City)	transferred	
1983-09-09	↳ Lintong County	↳ Lintong County	transferred	
1983-09-09	↳ Lantian County	↳ Lantian County	transferred	
1983-09-09	parts of Xianyang Prefecture	Xi'an (P-City)	transferred	
1983-09-09	↳ Hu County	↳ Hu County	transferred	
1983-09-09	↳ Zhouzhi County	↳ Zhouzhi County	transferred	
1983-09-09	↳ Gaoling County	↳ Gaoling County	transferred	
1983-09-09	Xianyang Prefecture	Xianyang (PL-City)	transferred	
1983-09-09	Xianyang (CL-City)	Qindu District	reorganized	
1983-09-09	parts of Baoji (PL-City)	Xi'an (PL-City)	transferred	
1983-09-09	↳ Yangling District	↳ Yangling District	transferred	
1983-09-09	Yan'an Prefecture	Tongchuan (PL-City)	reorganized	
1983-09-09	↳ Yijun County	↳ Yijun County	transferred	
1983-09-09	Weinan County	Weinan (CL-City)	reorganized	
1983-09-09	Hancheng County	Hancheng (CL-City)	reorganized	
1986-12-02	parts of Qindu District	Weicheng District	established	
1988-05-24	Yulin County	Yulin (CL-City)	reorganized	
1988-05-24	Ankang County	Ankang (CL-City)	reorganized	
1988-05-24	Shang County	Shangzhou (CL-City)	reorganized	
1990-12-27	Huayin County	Huayin (CL-City)	reorganized	
1993-06-08	Xingping County	Xingping (CL-City)	reorganized	Civil Affairs [1993]133
1994-12-17	Weinan Prefecture	Weinan (PL-City)	reorganized	State Council [1994]136
1994-12-17	Weinan (CL-City)	Linwei District	reorganized	State Council [1994]136
1996-02-21	Hanzhong Prefecture	Hanzhong (PL-City)	reorganized	State Council [1996]11
1996-02-21	Hanzhong (CL-City)	Hantai District	reorganized	State Council [1996]11
1996-11-05	Yan'an Prefecture	Yan'an (PL-City)	reorganized	State Council [1996]11
1996-11-05	Yan'an (CL-City)	Baota District	reorganized	State Council [1996]11
1997-06-25	Lintong County	Lintong District	reorganized	State Council [1997]57
1999-12-05	Yulin Prefecture	Yulin (PL-City)	reorganized	State Council [1999]141
1999-12-05	Yulin (CL-City)	Yuyang District	reorganized	State Council [1999]141
2000-01-07	Cheng District, Tongchuan	Yintai District	renamed	
2000-01-07	Jiao District, Tongchuan	Wangyi District	renamed	
2000-06-23	Ankang Prefecture	Ankang (PL-City)	reorganized	
2000-06-23	Ankang (CL-City)	Hanbin District	reorganized	
2001-08-31	Shangluo Prefecture	Shangluo (PL-City)	reorganized	State Council [2001]94
2001-08-31	Shangzhou (CL-City)	Shangzhou District	reorganized	State Council [2001]94
2002-06-02	Chang'an County	Chang'an District	reorganized	State Council [2002]45
2002-06-18	Yao County	Yaozhou District	reorganized	State Council [2002]54
2003-03-01	Baoji County	Chencang District	reorganized	State Council [2003]35
2005-10-17	Wuqi County (吴旗县)	Wuqi County (吴起县)	renamed	Civil Affairs [2005]128
2014-12-30	Gaoling County	Gaoling District	reorganized	State Council [2014]158
2015-10-13	Hua County	Huazhou District	reorganized	State Council [2015]186
2015-12-03	Hengshan County	Hengshan District	reorganized	State Council [2015]209
2016-06-08	Ansai County	Ansai District	reorganized	State Council [2016]104
2016-11-24	Hu County	Huyi District	reorganized	State Council [2016]188
2017-04-09	Shenmu County	Shenmu (CL-City)	reorganized	Civil Affairs [2017]71
2017-07-18	Nanzheng County	Nanzheng District	reorganized	State Council [2017]108
2018-02-22	Bin County	Binzhou (CL-City)	reorganized	Civil Affairs [2018]47
2019-07-20	Zichang County	Zichang (CL-City)	reorganized	Civil Affairs [2019]73

== Population composition ==
=== Prefectures ===
Prefecture	2010	2000
Xi'an	8,467,837	7,411,411
Ankang	2,629,906	2,665,668
Baoji	3,716,731	3,632,351
Hanzhong	3,800,333	3,478,583
Shangluo	2,341,742	2,390,122
Tongchuan	834,437	808,056
Weinan	5,286,077	5,394,806
Xianyang	4,894,834	4,838,754
Yan'an	2,187,009	2,055,941
Yulin	3,351,437	3,198,981

=== Counties ===
Name	Prefecture	2010
Xincheng	Xi'an	589,739
Beilin	Xi'an	614,710
Lianhu	Xi'an	698,513
Baqiao	Xi'an	595,124
Weiyang	Xi'an	806,811
Yanta	Xi'an	1,178,529
Yanliang	Xi'an	278,604
Lintong	Xi'an	655,874
Chang'an	Xi'an	1,083,285
Lantian	Xi'an	514,026
Zhouzhi	Xi'an	562,768
Huyi	Xi'an	556,377
Gaoling	Xi'an	333,477
Yaozhou	Tongchuan	200,230
Yintai	Tongchuan	217,509
Wangyi	Tongchuan	325,538
Yijun	Tongchuan	91,160
Weibin	Baoji	448,189
Jintai	Baoji	394,538
Chencang	Baoji	595,075
Fengxiang	Baoji	483,471
Qishan	Baoji	459,064
Fufeng	Baoji	416,398
Mei(xian)	Baoji	299,988
Long(xian)	Baoji	248,901
Qianyang	Baoji	123,959
Linyou	Baoji	90,728
Feng(xian)	Baoji	105,492
Taibai	Baoji	50,928
Qindu	Xianyang	507,093
Yangling	Xianyang	201,172
Weicheng	Xianyang	438,327
Sanyuan	Xianyang	403,529
Jingyang	Xianyang	487,749
Qian(xian)	Xianyang	527,088
Liquan	Xianyang	447,771
Yongshou	Xianyang	184,642
Bin(xian)	Xianyang	323,256
Changwu	Xianyang	167,570
Xunyi	Xianyang	261,566
Chunhua	Xianyang	193,377
Wugong	Xianyang	411,312
Xingping	Xianyang	541,554
Linwei	Weinan	877,142
Hua(xian)	Weinan	322,148
Tongguan	Weinan	155,463
Dali	Weinan	693,392
Heyang	Weinan	436,441
Chengcheng	Weinan	386,150
Pucheng	Weinan	743,000
Baishui	Weinan	279,679
Fuping	Weinan	743,385
Hancheng	Weinan	391,164
Huayin	Weinan	258,113
Baota	Yan'an	475,234
Yanchang	Yan'an	125,391
Yanchuan	Yan'an	168,375
Zichang	Yan'an	216,910
Ansai	Yan'an	171,552
Zhidan	Yan'an	140,489
Wuqi	Yan'an	145,061
Ganquan	Yan'an	77,188
Fu(xian)	Yan'an	149,727
Luochuan	Yan'an	220,684
Yichuan	Yan'an	117,203
Huanglong	Yan'an	49,392
Huangling	Yan'an	129,803
Hantai	Hanzhong	534,923
Nanzheng	Hanzhong	471,634
Chenggu	Hanzhong	464,903
Yang(xian)	Hanzhong	383,981
Xixiang	Hanzhong	341,812
Mian(xian)	Hanzhong	388,123
Ningqiang	Hanzhong	308,885
Lueyang	Hanzhong	201,645
Zhenba	Hanzhong	246,817
Liuba	Hanzhong	43,398
Foping	Hanzhong	30,075
Yuyang	Yulin	637,617
Shenmu	Yulin	455,493
Fugu	Yulin	260,585
Hengshan	Yulin	288,053
Jingbian	Yulin	355,939
Dingbian	Yulin	319,370
Suide	Yulin	296,088
Mizhi	Yulin	154,953
Jia(xian)	Yulin	204,666
Wubu	Yulin	75,748
Qingjian	Yulin	128,938
Zizhou	Yulin	173,987
Hanbin	Ankang	870,126
Hanyin	Ankang	246,147
Shiquan	Ankang	171,097
Ningshan	Ankang	70,435
Ziyang	Ankang	283,947
Langao	Ankang	154,157
Pingli	Ankang	192,959
Zhenping	Ankang	50,966
Xunyang	Ankang	426,677
Baihe	Ankang	163,395
Shangzhou	Shangluo	531,646
Luonan	Shangluo	441,643
Danfeng	Shangluo	295,424
Shangnan	Shangluo	221,564
Shanyang	Shangluo	422,255
Zhen'an	Shangluo	275,862
Zhashui	Shangluo	153,348
