= Hanbin District =

Hanbin 汉滨区
- District
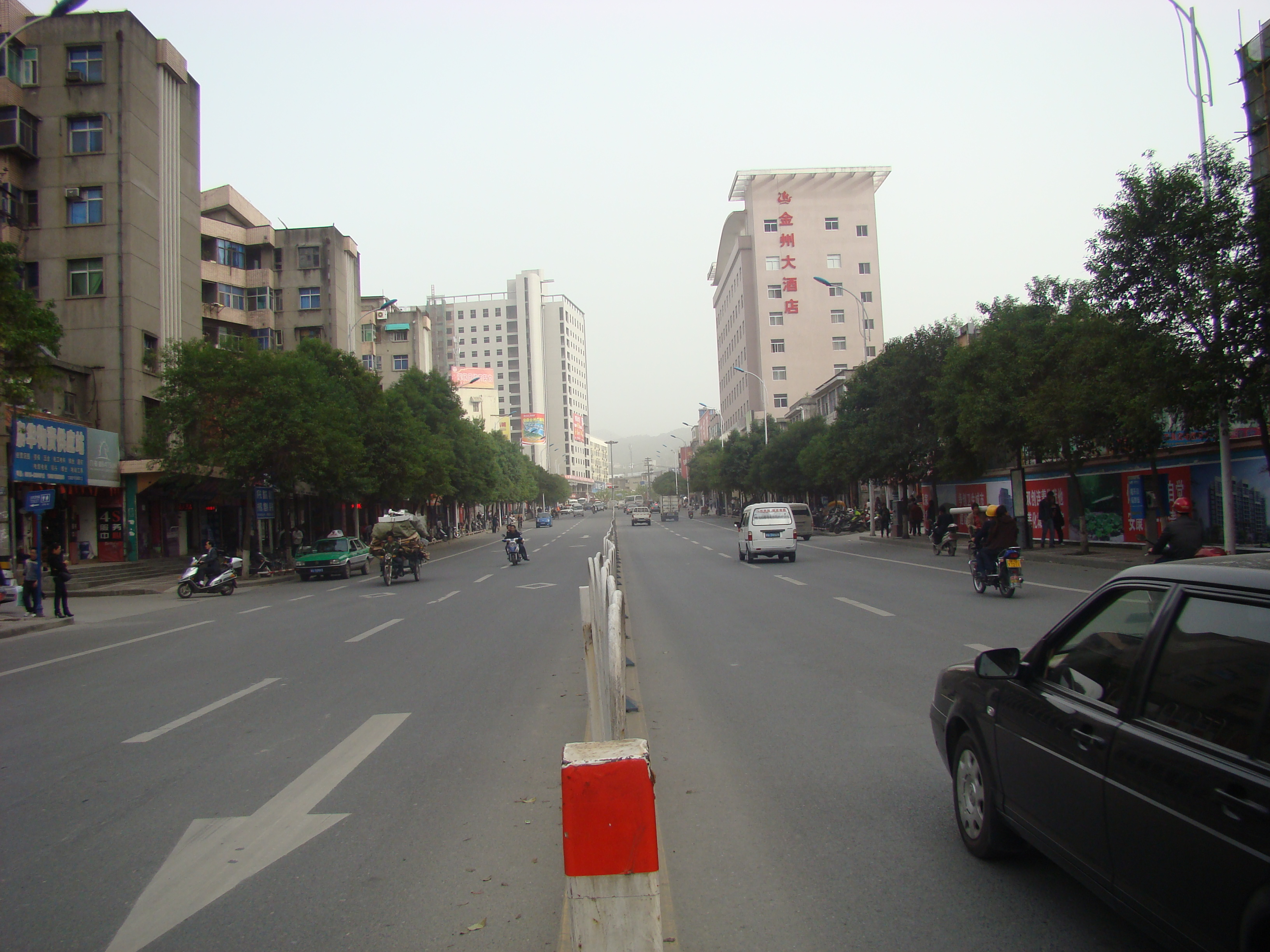

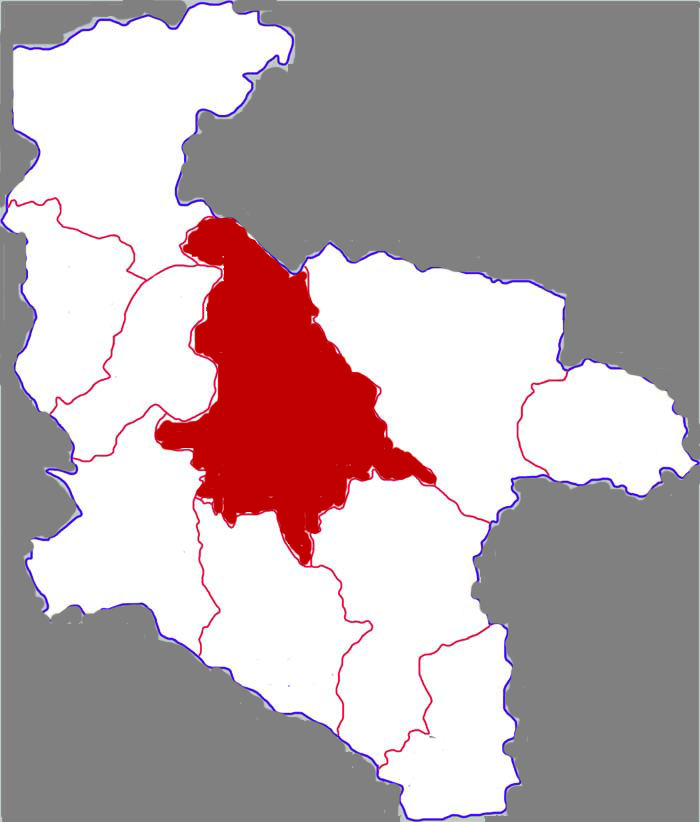
- Hanbin in Ankang

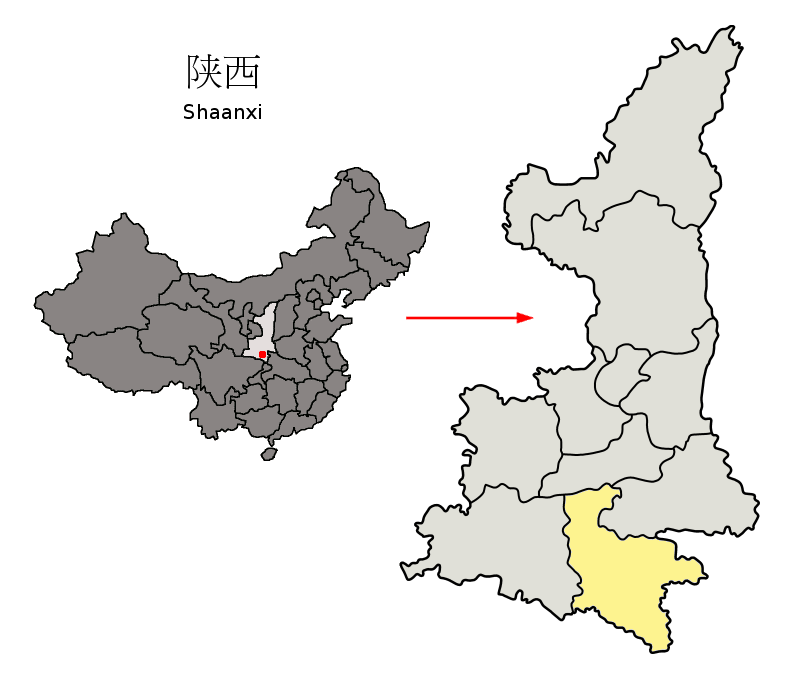
- Ankang in Shaanxi
- Coordinates: 32°41′43″N 109°01′36″E
- Country: People's Republic of China
- Province: Shaanxi
- Prefecture-level city: Ankang

Government
  - Party Secretary: Wang Xiaocheng (Chinese Communist Party)
  - District Mayor: Fan Chuanbin
  - District Congress Director: Li Senwen
  - CPPCC District Chair: Li Jianfei

Area
  - District: 3,646 km^{2} (1,408 sq mi)
  - Urban: 45 km^{2} (17 sq mi)

Population (2018)
  - District: 1,020,000
  - Density: 280/km^{2} (725/sq mi)
- Time zone: UTC+8 (China standard time)
- Postal code: 725000-725099
- Area code: 0915
- Licence plates: 陕G
- GDP: 2019
  - Total: ¥38.095 billion
  - Per capita: ¥43040
- Website: www.hanbin.gov.cn

Hanbin District (simplified Chinese: 汉滨区; traditional Chinese: 漢濱區; pinyin: Hànbīn Qū) is a district of the City of Ankang in Shaanxi Province, China and the seat of the city's government. It has a population of 886,393 as of 2019 and an area of 3,645.91 km^{2}. With forests covering 68.8% of its land, the district abounds in natural resources and remains a popular destination of tourism in Shaanxi.

Between the Qinling and the Daba Mountains, Hanbin District is centrally located in Ankang, bordering the counties Ningshan, Hanyin, and Ziyang on the west, Langao and Pingli on the south, Xunyang on the east, and Zhen'an on the north. Three expressways (G65, G7011, and G4213), three railways (Yangpingguan-Ankang, Xiangyang-Chongqing, Xi'an-Ankang) and an airport make Hanbin a transportation hub in the Shaannan (Chinese: 陕南) region.

Human settlement in what is called Hanbin District today dates back to the Neolithic period over 7,000 years ago. In 312 BC, a Xicheng County (Chinese: 西城縣) was instituted by the Qin state (Chinese: 秦國) here, marking the beginning of the area's countyhood. From the 4th century BC to the late 20th century, it was a county under various dynasties and regimes, until being established as a county-level city in 1988, and finally became a district of the prefectural City of Ankang in 2000.

== Administrative divisions ==
As of 2019, Hanbin District is divided to 4 subdistricts and 24 towns.

Subdistricts

- Laocheng Subdistrict (老城街道)
- Xincheng Subdistrict (新城街道)
- Jiangbei Subdistrict (江北街道)
- Jianmin Subdistrict (建民街道)

Towns

- Guanmiao (关庙镇)
- Zhangtan (张滩镇)
- Yinghu (瀛湖镇)
- Wuli (五里镇)
- Hengkou (恒口镇)
- Jihe (吉河镇)
- Liushui (流水镇)
- Dazhuyuan (大竹园镇)
- Hongshan (洪山镇)
- Cigou (茨沟镇)
- Dahe (大河镇)
- Shenba (沈坝镇)
- Shuanglong (双龙镇)
- Yeping (叶坪镇)
- Zhongyuan (中原镇)
- Xianhe (县河镇)
- Zijing (紫荆镇)
- Zaoyang (早阳镇)
- Guanjia (关家镇)
- Shiti (石梯镇)
- Bahe (坝河镇)
- Niutie (牛蹄镇)
- Yanba (晏坝镇)
- Tanba (谭坝镇)
