= Zhushan County =

Zhushan County 竹山县 Chushan
- County
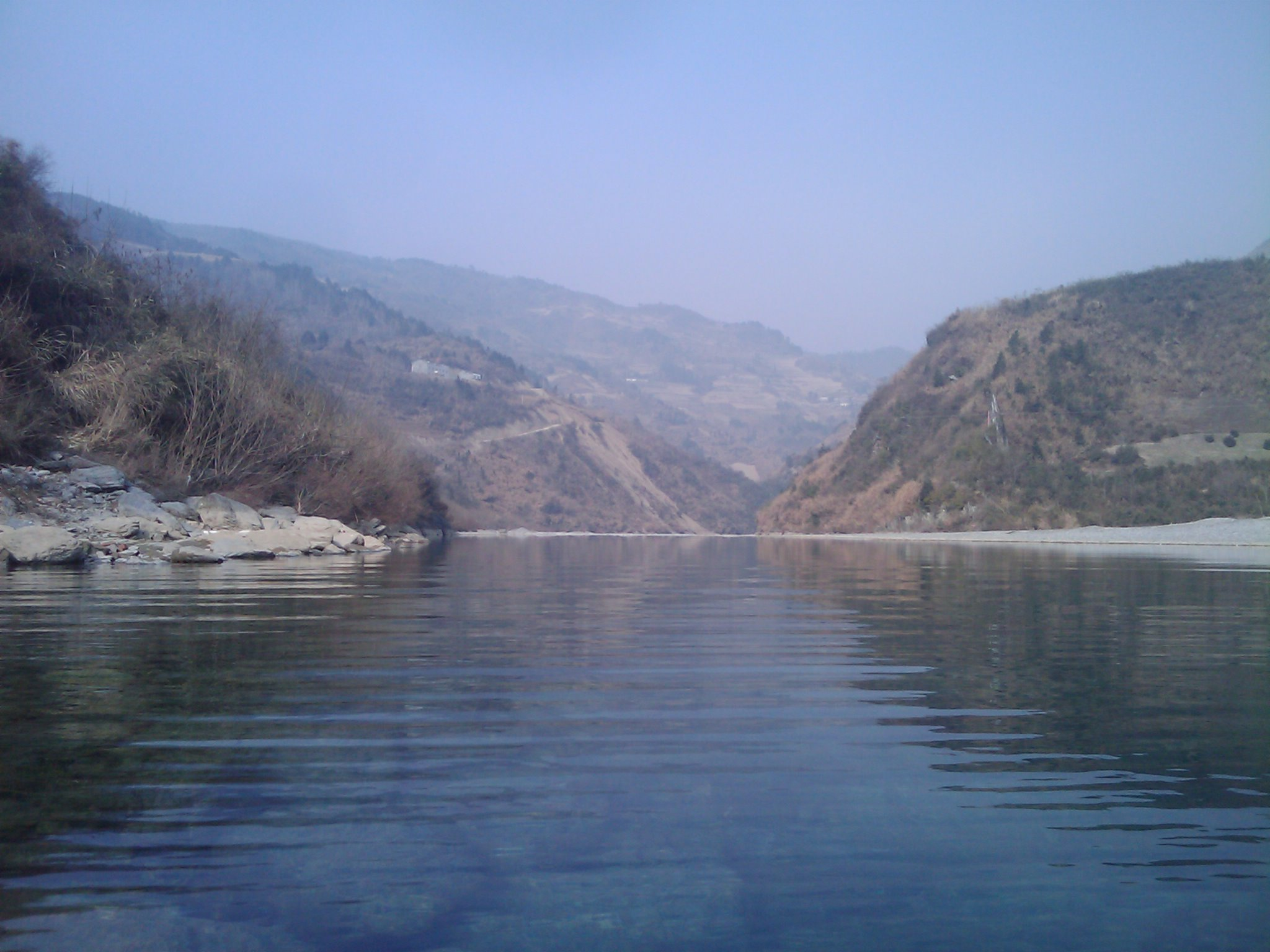
- The Duhe River (Chinese: Duhe Shui, 堵河水)

- Location in Hubei
- Coordinates: 32°13′30″N 110°13′43″E
- Country: People's Republic of China
- Province: Hubei
- Prefecture-level city: Shiyan

Area
  - Total: 3,590 km^{2} (1,390 sq mi)

Population (2020)
  - Total: 346,069
  - Density: 96.4/km^{2} (250/sq mi)
- Time zone: UTC+8 (China Standard)
- Website: zhushan.gov.cn

Zhushan County (simplified Chinese: 竹山县; traditional Chinese: 竹山縣; pinyin: Zhúshān Xiàn) is a county in Shiyan, northwestern Hubei province, China, bordering Shaanxi province to the north and Chongqing municipality to the south. The county spans an area of 3,587.8 square kilometres (1,385.3 mi^{2}), and has a population of 346,069 as of 2020.

== Toponymy ==
Emperor Fei of the ancient state of Western Wei named the county Zhushan (Chinese: 竹山), meaning bamboo mountain.

== History ==
The area of present-day Zhushan County belonged to the Chu State until 611 BCE. After this time, it belonged to the Shangyong Commandery.

In 1377, it placed under Xiangyang Fu, and remained there until the establishment of Yunyang Fu in 1476.

=== Republic of China ===
In 1914, the area was reorganized as Xiangyang Circuit.

In 1932, the Republic of China introduced Administrative Inspectorates, and the county belonged to the 11th Administrative Inspectorate of Hubei Province.

=== People's Republic of China ===
On January 20, 1948, the area was taken by the People's Liberation Army. In 1949, it was organized into the Liangyun Prefecture, which was renamed to Yunyang Prefecture in April 1950.

In January 1953, the area was moved to the Xiangyang Prefecture.

In 1965, it was once again moved to Yunyang Prefecture.

In October 1994, the area was reorganized as part of the newly expanded prefecture-level city of Shiyan.

== Geography ==
Zhushan County is located in the northwestof Hubei province. Over 80% of the county is mountainous. The Du River, called Duhe Shui (堵河水) in Chinese, the largest tributary of the Han River, flows through the county.

The county is bordered by Fang County to the east, Yunyang District and Baihe County in Shaanxi to the north, Zhuxi County and Xunyang County in Shaanxi to the west, and Shennongjia and Wuxi County in Chongqing to the south.

== Climate ==
Climate data for Zhushan, elevation 307 m (1,007 ft), (1991–2020 normals, extremes 1981–present)
| Month | Jan | Feb | Mar | Apr | May | Jun | Jul | Aug | Sep | Oct | Nov | Dec | Year |
|---|---|---|---|---|---|---|---|---|---|---|---|---|---|
| Record high °C (°F) | 20.8 (69.4) | 24.5 (76.1) | 34.2 (93.6) | 37.2 (99.0) | 38.4 (101.1) | 41.6 (106.9) | 40.8 (105.4) | 44.6 (112.3) | 40.1 (104.2) | 33.3 (91.9) | 26.4 (79.5) | 20.3 (68.5) | 44.6 (112.3) |
| Mean daily maximum °C (°F) | 9.1 (48.4) | 12.4 (54.3) | 17.8 (64.0) | 24.1 (75.4) | 27.6 (81.7) | 31.0 (87.8) | 33.6 (92.5) | 32.5 (90.5) | 27.3 (81.1) | 21.7 (71.1) | 16.0 (60.8) | 10.5 (50.9) | 22.0 (71.5) |
| Daily mean °C (°F) | 3.6 (38.5) | 6.4 (43.5) | 11.1 (52.0) | 16.7 (62.1) | 20.7 (69.3) | 24.7 (76.5) | 27.3 (81.1) | 26.4 (79.5) | 21.8 (71.2) | 16.3 (61.3) | 10.4 (50.7) | 5.1 (41.2) | 15.9 (60.6) |
| Mean daily minimum °C (°F) | 0.1 (32.2) | 2.3 (36.1) | 6.3 (43.3) | 11.5 (52.7) | 16.0 (60.8) | 20.1 (68.2) | 23.2 (73.8) | 22.6 (72.7) | 18.4 (65.1) | 13.2 (55.8) | 7.2 (45.0) | 1.9 (35.4) | 11.9 (53.4) |
| Record low °C (°F) | −6.7 (19.9) | −5.3 (22.5) | −3.4 (25.9) | 0.4 (32.7) | 6.7 (44.1) | 12.9 (55.2) | 16.2 (61.2) | 15.3 (59.5) | 8.9 (48.0) | 0.9 (33.6) | −2.8 (27.0) | −10.4 (13.3) | −10.4 (13.3) |
| Average precipitation mm (inches) | 11.8 (0.46) | 15.3 (0.60) | 41.9 (1.65) | 64.8 (2.55) | 104.3 (4.11) | 114.3 (4.50) | 133.4 (5.25) | 124.0 (4.88) | 102.1 (4.02) | 79.5 (3.13) | 33.1 (1.30) | 12.7 (0.50) | 837.2 (32.95) |
| Average precipitation days (≥ 0.1 mm) | 6.3 | 7.2 | 9.7 | 10.7 | 13.4 | 11.9 | 12.0 | 12.1 | 12.3 | 11.6 | 8.6 | 6.7 | 122.5 |
| Average snowy days | 4.3 | 3.0 | 1.0 | 0.1 | 0 | 0 | 0 | 0 | 0 | 0 | 0.8 | 2.3 | 11.5 |
| Average relative humidity (%) | 73 | 69 | 68 | 70 | 74 | 75 | 77 | 77 | 79 | 82 | 81 | 77 | 75 |
| Mean monthly sunshine hours | 96.2 | 100.7 | 136.6 | 158.8 | 165.4 | 169.5 | 198.0 | 186.2 | 124.9 | 107.3 | 95.6 | 92.0 | 1,631.2 |
| Percentage possible sunshine | 30 | 32 | 37 | 41 | 39 | 40 | 46 | 46 | 34 | 31 | 31 | 30 | 36 |
Source: China Meteorological Administration

== Administrative divisions ==
Zhushan County administers nine towns and eight townships. These township-level divisions then administer 254 village-level divisions.

The county's nine towns are Chengguan, Yishui, Majiadu, Baofeng, Leigu, Qingu, Desheng, Shangyong, and Guandu.

The county's eight townships are Pankou Township, Zhuping Township, Damiao Township, Shuangtai Township, Loutai Township, Wenfeng Township, Shenhe Township, and Liulin Township.
