= Qianyang =

Qianyang may refer to the following places in China:

- Hongjiang, formerly Qianyang, city in Huaihua, Hunan
- Qianyang County (千阳县), in Baoji, Shaanxi
- Qianyang, Donggang, Liaoning (前阳镇), town in Donggang, Liaoning
