= Shangnan County =

Shangnan County 商南县
- County
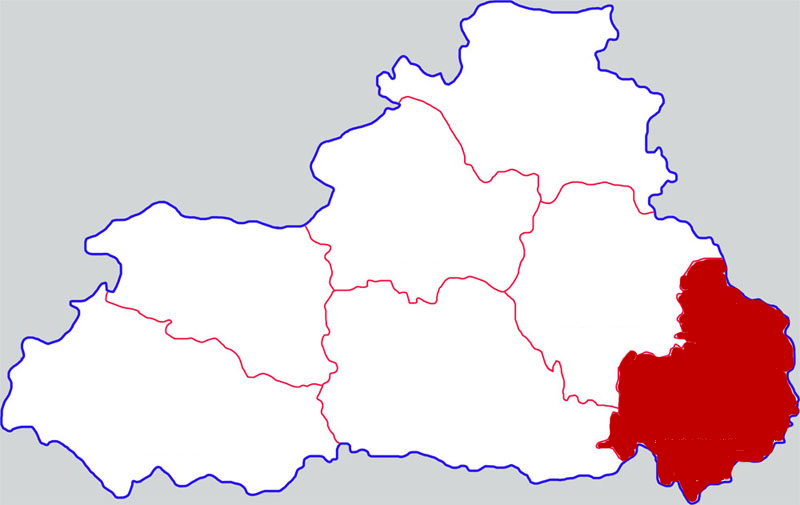
- Shangnan in Shangluo

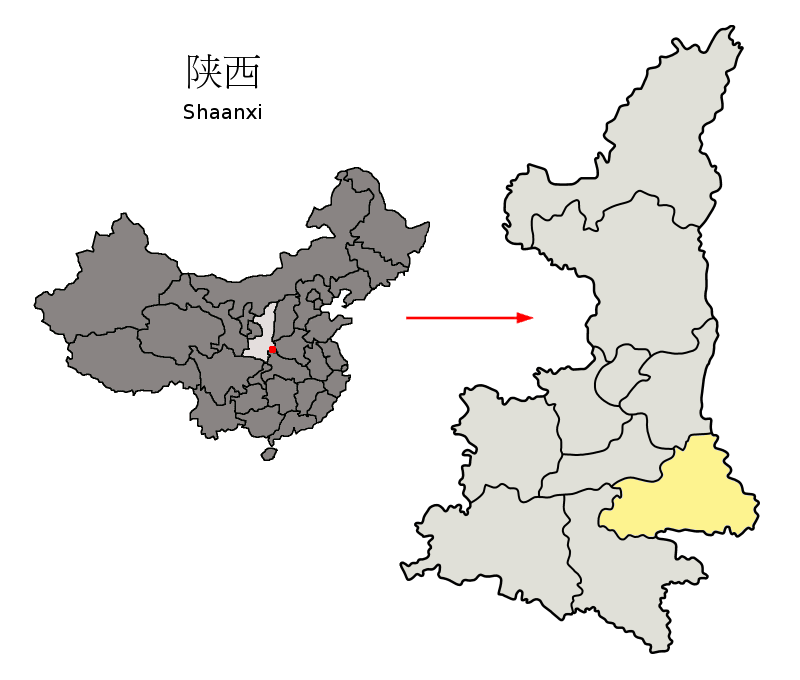
- Shangluo in Shaanxi
- Coordinates: 33°31′52″N 110°52′55″E
- Country: People's Republic of China
- Province: Shaanxi
- Prefecture-level city: Shangluo

Area
  - Total: 2,307 km^{2} (891 sq mi)

Population (2004)
  - Total: 230,000
  - Density: 100/km^{2} (260/sq mi)
- Time zone: UTC+8 (China Standard)
- Postal code: 726300
- Area code: 0914

Shangnan County (simplified Chinese: 商南县; traditional Chinese: 商南縣; pinyin: Shāngnán Xiàn) is a county in the east of Shaanxi province, China, bordering the provinces of Henan to the east and Hubei to the south. It is the easternmost county-level division of the prefecture-level city of Shangluo, and has an area of 2,307 km^{2} (891 sq mi) and a population of 230,000 as of 2004.

== Administrative divisions ==
Shangnan County has 1 subdistrict and 8 towns.

1 subdistrict

- Chengguan (城关街道)

8 towns

- Shiliping (十里坪镇)
- Qingyouhe (清油河镇)
- Shima (试马镇)
- Guofenglou (过风楼镇)
- Zhaochuan (赵川镇)
- Xianghe (湘河镇)
- Fushui (富水镇)
- Qingshan (青山镇)

== Climate ==
Climate data for Shangnan, elevation 523 m (1,716 ft), (1991–2020 normals, extremes 1981–present)
Month	Jan	Feb	Mar	Apr	May	Jun	Jul	Aug	Sep	Oct	Nov	Dec	Year
Record high °C (°F)	20.3 (68.5)	22.6 (72.7)	34.4 (93.9)	34.7 (94.5)	38.1 (100.6)	41.3 (106.3)	39.1 (102.4)	38.0 (100.4)	38.5 (101.3)	32.8 (91.0)	26.6 (79.9)	23.5 (74.3)	41.3 (106.3)
Mean daily maximum °C (°F)	7.6 (45.7)	10.6 (51.1)	15.9 (60.6)	22.4 (72.3)	26.3 (79.3)	29.8 (85.6)	30.9 (87.6)	29.7 (85.5)	25.3 (77.5)	20.6 (69.1)	14.9 (58.8)	9.6 (49.3)	20.3 (68.5)
Daily mean °C (°F)	1.6 (34.9)	4.4 (39.9)	9.3 (48.7)	15.2 (59.4)	19.6 (67.3)	23.4 (74.1)	25.5 (77.9)	24.3 (75.7)	19.8 (67.6)	14.4 (57.9)	8.6 (47.5)	3.3 (37.9)	14.1 (57.4)
Mean daily minimum °C (°F)	−2.6 (27.3)	0.0 (32.0)	4.4 (39.9)	9.6 (49.3)	14.0 (57.2)	18.3 (64.9)	21.6 (70.9)	20.6 (69.1)	15.9 (60.6)	10.1 (50.2)	4.1 (39.4)	−1.0 (30.2)	9.6 (49.3)
Record low °C (°F)	−10.8 (12.6)	−8.9 (16.0)	−6.2 (20.8)	−1.1 (30.0)	4.2 (39.6)	10.6 (51.1)	14.4 (57.9)	13.3 (55.9)	5.6 (42.1)	−1.7 (28.9)	−7.5 (18.5)	−13.1 (8.4)	−13.1 (8.4)
Average precipitation mm (inches)	12.1 (0.48)	16.2 (0.64)	33.1 (1.30)	54.3 (2.14)	78.1 (3.07)	93.1 (3.67)	190.0 (7.48)	148.8 (5.86)	114.8 (4.52)	57.9 (2.28)	29.3 (1.15)	8.4 (0.33)	836.1 (32.92)
Average precipitation days (≥ 0.1 mm)	5.2	5.7	8.2	8.6	10.9	11.2	15.0	13.6	12.5	10.5	7.4	4.7	113.5
Average snowy days	5.6	4.2	1.7	0.1	0	0	0	0	0	0	1.2	3.0	15.8
Average relative humidity (%)	61	62	63	64	67	72	80	82	80	75	69	61	70
Mean monthly sunshine hours	138.4	126.2	154.7	181.0	186.1	176.6	177.6	168.1	133.1	140.5	135.9	145.8	1,864
Percentage possible sunshine	44	40	41	46	43	41	41	41	36	41	44	47	42
Source: China Meteorological Administration

== Transport ==
- China National Highway 312
