= Foping County =

County in Shaanxi, China

Coordinates: 33°34′N 107°59′E

Foping County 佛坪县
- County
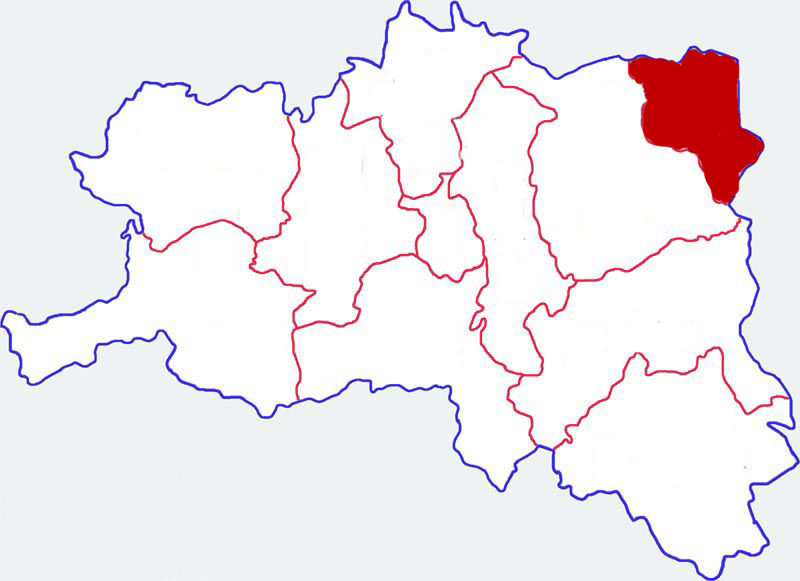
- Location in Hanzhong

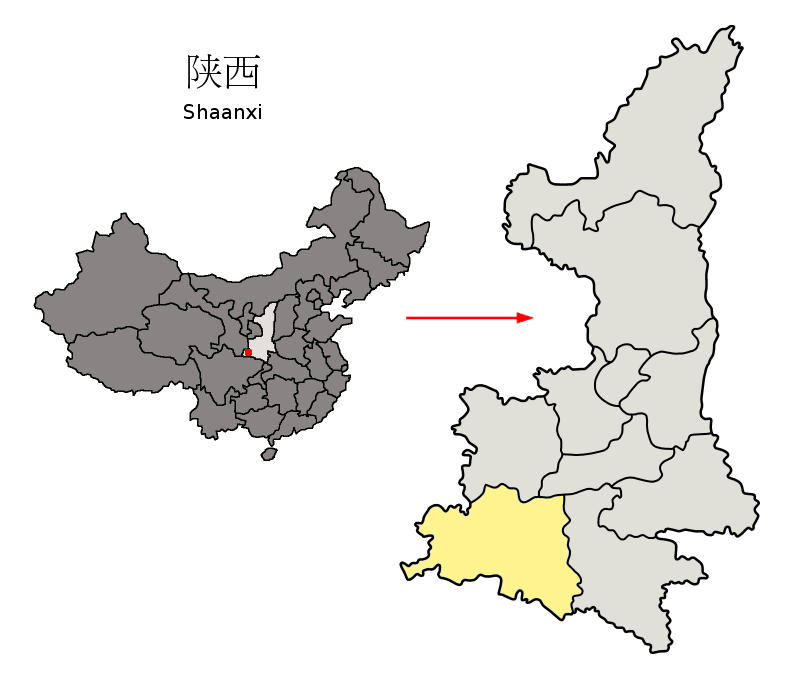
- Hanzhong in Shaanxi
- Country: People's Republic of China
- Province: Shaanxi
- Prefecture-level city: Hanzhong

Area
  - Total: 1,279 km^{2} (494 sq mi)

Population (2018)
  - Total: 32,584
  - Density: 25.48/km^{2} (65.98/sq mi)
- Time zone: UTC+8 (China standard time)
- Postal code: 723400
- Licence plates: 陕F
- Website: www.foping.gov.cn

Foping (Chinese: 佛坪; pinyin: Fópíng) is a county under the administration and in the northeast corner of Hanzhong City, in the south of Shaanxi province, China.

The county was first established in 1824.

It has been called the 'home of dogwood', having over 100,000 Mu (ca. 162 km^{2}) of dogwood forests. The Qinling panda was first discovered in Foping.

== Administrative divisions ==
As of 2019, Foping County is divided to 1 subdistrict and 6 towns.

Subdistricts

- Yuanjiazhuang Subdistrict (袁家庄街道)

Towns

- Chenjiaba (陈家坝镇)
- Daheba (大河坝镇)
- Xichahe (西岔河镇)
- Yueba (岳坝镇)
- Changjiaoba (长角坝镇)
- Shidunhe (石墩河镇)

== Climate ==
Climate data for Foping, elevation 827 m (2,713 ft), (2001–2020 normals, extremes 1981–present)
Month	Jan	Feb	Mar	Apr	May	Jun	Jul	Aug	Sep	Oct	Nov	Dec	Year
Record high °C (°F)	17.7 (63.9)	22.7 (72.9)	30.8 (87.4)	31.5 (88.7)	34.9 (94.8)	37.0 (98.6)	38.7 (101.7)	37.2 (99.0)	36.8 (98.2)	28.3 (82.9)	24.6 (76.3)	19.0 (66.2)	38.7 (101.7)
Mean daily maximum °C (°F)	7.7 (45.9)	10.2 (50.4)	16.1 (61.0)	21.7 (71.1)	24.5 (76.1)	28.0 (82.4)	29.7 (85.5)	29.0 (84.2)	23.4 (74.1)	18.7 (65.7)	13.6 (56.5)	8.7 (47.7)	19.3 (66.7)
Daily mean °C (°F)	1.8 (35.2)	4.3 (39.7)	9.3 (48.7)	14.2 (57.6)	17.6 (63.7)	21.4 (70.5)	23.6 (74.5)	22.9 (73.2)	18.3 (64.9)	13.2 (55.8)	7.8 (46.0)	2.9 (37.2)	13.1 (55.6)
Mean daily minimum °C (°F)	−2.2 (28.0)	0.4 (32.7)	4.5 (40.1)	8.9 (48.0)	12.7 (54.9)	16.6 (61.9)	19.5 (67.1)	19.1 (66.4)	15.1 (59.2)	10.0 (50.0)	4.1 (39.4)	−0.9 (30.4)	9.0 (48.2)
Record low °C (°F)	−9.7 (14.5)	−7.9 (17.8)	−6.8 (19.8)	−2.9 (26.8)	3.3 (37.9)	8.3 (46.9)	11.2 (52.2)	10.4 (50.7)	6.1 (43.0)	−5.5 (22.1)	−8.0 (17.6)	−14.4 (6.1)	−14.4 (6.1)
Average precipitation mm (inches)	3.7 (0.15)	12.8 (0.50)	23.9 (0.94)	57.4 (2.26)	95.8 (3.77)	114.6 (4.51)	198.9 (7.83)	178.5 (7.03)	156.3 (6.15)	74.3 (2.93)	29.0 (1.14)	5.0 (0.20)	950.2 (37.41)
Average precipitation days (≥ 0.1 mm)	4.1	6.4	8.8	10.2	12.9	12.2	15.7	14.3	14.1	13.5	8.0	4.0	124.2
Average snowy days	5.2	3.9	1.1	0.2	0	0	0	0	0	0	1.1	2.6	14.1
Average relative humidity (%)	64	66	63	66	73	76	80	81	84	83	77	66	73
Mean monthly sunshine hours	100.2	90.3	131.2	155.0	152.6	154.5	164.2	161.9	101.2	99.0	94.6	97.7	1,502.4
Percentage possible sunshine	32	29	35	40	35	36	38	40	28	28	31	32	34
Source: China Meteorological Administration
