= Baihe County =

Coordinates: 32°42′51″N 109°55′16″E

Baihe County 白河县 Paiho
- County
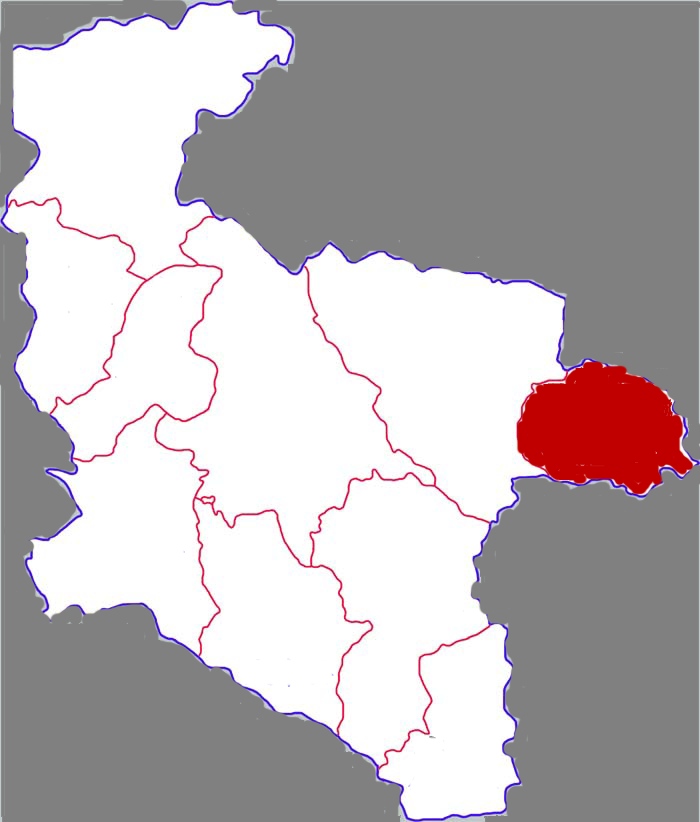
- Baihe in Ankang

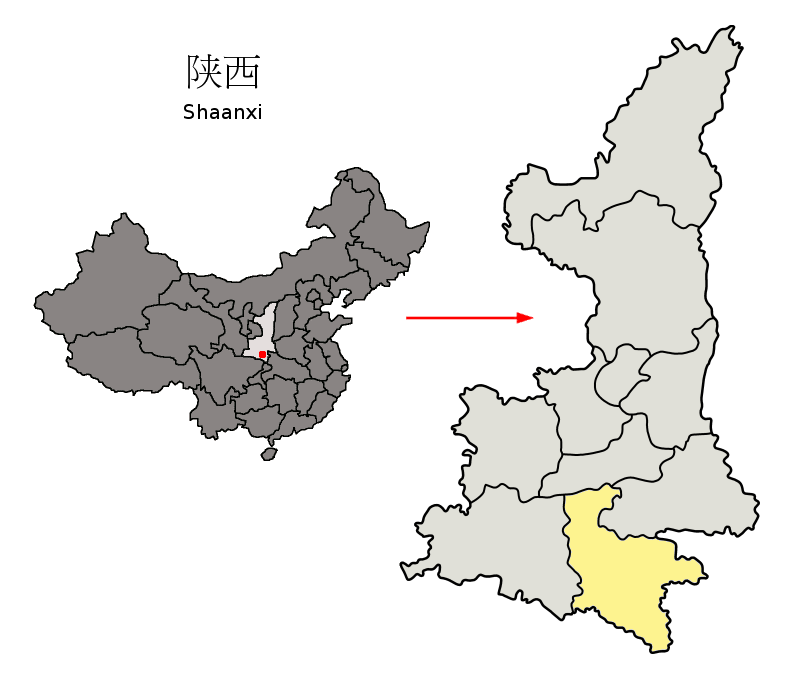
- Ankang in Shaanxi
- Country: People's Republic of China
- Province: Shaanxi
- Prefecture-level city: Ankang

Area
  - County: 1,455 km^{2} (562 sq mi)
- Highest elevation: 1,901 m (6,237 ft)
- Lowest elevation: 170 m (560 ft)

Population (2020)
  - County: 162,774
  - Density: 111.9/km^{2} (289.7/sq mi)
  - Urban: 72,830
  - Rural: 89,944
- Time zone: UTC+8 (China standard time)
- Postal Code: 725800
- Website: www.baihe.gov.cn

Baihe County (simplified Chinese: 白河县; traditional Chinese: 白河縣; pinyin: Báihé Xiàn; lit. 'white river') is located in the southeastern portion of Shaanxi province, China and is the easternmost county-level division under the jurisdiction of the prefecture-level city of Ankang. It is by the eastern part of the Daba Mountains and approaches the Han River on the north. On the east it borders Yun County (Hubei), on the south Zhushan County (Hubei), on the west Xunyang County, and is separated from Yunxi County (Hubei) by the Han River. As of November 2020 the population was 162,774.

Baihe is in the north subtropical to warm temperate transitional climatic zone, and is part of the continental seasonal monsoon climate zone. The average temperature is 12.2 to 16.5 °C (54.0 to 61.7 °F), average yearly sunlight 1753.8 hours, average rainfall 787.5 mm (31.00 in), and has 234 to 261 frost-free days each year.

Baihe was historically nicknamed "The Head of Qin and the Tail of Wei." It is a largely rural county, populated mainly by Han Chinese.

Baihe's main outside transportation connections are the Xiangyu Railway, National Highway 316 and the Shiyan–Tianshui Expressway.

== Administrative divisions ==
As of 2019, Baihe County is divided to 11 towns.

Towns

- Chengguan (城关镇)
- Zhongchang (中厂镇)
- Gouba (构扒镇)
- Kazi (卡子镇)
- Maoping (茅坪镇)
- Songjia (宋家镇)
- Xiying (西营镇)
- Cangshang (仓上镇)
- Lengshui (冷水镇)
- Shuangfeng (双丰镇)
- Mahu (麻虎镇)

== Climate ==
Climate data for Baihe, elevation 323 m (1,060 ft), (1991–2020 normals, extremes 1981–present)
| Month | Jan | Feb | Mar | Apr | May | Jun | Jul | Aug | Sep | Oct | Nov | Dec | Year |
|---|---|---|---|---|---|---|---|---|---|---|---|---|---|
| Record high °C (°F) | 19.8 (67.6) | 24.0 (75.2) | 36.3 (97.3) | 36.7 (98.1) | 37.9 (100.2) | 40.7 (105.3) | 42.1 (107.8) | 42.1 (107.8) | 41.2 (106.2) | 33.2 (91.8) | 27.4 (81.3) | 20.6 (69.1) | 42.1 (107.8) |
| Mean daily maximum °C (°F) | 8.8 (47.8) | 11.9 (53.4) | 17.5 (63.5) | 23.8 (74.8) | 27.6 (81.7) | 31.2 (88.2) | 33.3 (91.9) | 32.2 (90.0) | 27.0 (80.6) | 21.6 (70.9) | 15.8 (60.4) | 10.4 (50.7) | 21.8 (71.2) |
| Daily mean °C (°F) | 3.4 (38.1) | 6.1 (43.0) | 11.0 (51.8) | 16.6 (61.9) | 20.9 (69.6) | 24.8 (76.6) | 27.2 (81.0) | 26.3 (79.3) | 21.5 (70.7) | 16.0 (60.8) | 10.2 (50.4) | 5.0 (41.0) | 15.8 (60.4) |
| Mean daily minimum °C (°F) | −0.3 (31.5) | 2.0 (35.6) | 6.2 (43.2) | 11.3 (52.3) | 15.8 (60.4) | 19.9 (67.8) | 23.0 (73.4) | 22.4 (72.3) | 18.0 (64.4) | 12.6 (54.7) | 6.7 (44.1) | 1.4 (34.5) | 11.6 (52.9) |
| Record low °C (°F) | −6.8 (19.8) | −6.3 (20.7) | −3.0 (26.6) | −0.1 (31.8) | 7.5 (45.5) | 13.6 (56.5) | 15.3 (59.5) | 14.5 (58.1) | 9.2 (48.6) | 1.0 (33.8) | −2.8 (27.0) | −11.6 (11.1) | −11.6 (11.1) |
| Average precipitation mm (inches) | 12.7 (0.50) | 15.7 (0.62) | 37.6 (1.48) | 57.2 (2.25) | 81.4 (3.20) | 105.3 (4.15) | 122.9 (4.84) | 122.0 (4.80) | 102.8 (4.05) | 73.2 (2.88) | 32.4 (1.28) | 9.5 (0.37) | 772.7 (30.42) |
| Average precipitation days (≥ 0.1 mm) | 5.6 | 6.6 | 9.1 | 10.2 | 11.4 | 11.0 | 12.8 | 11.6 | 12.2 | 11.5 | 8.4 | 5.2 | 115.6 |
| Average snowy days | 4.3 | 3.3 | 1.4 | 0.1 | 0 | 0 | 0 | 0 | 0 | 0 | 0.7 | 1.9 | 11.7 |
| Average relative humidity (%) | 69 | 67 | 66 | 69 | 72 | 74 | 78 | 79 | 81 | 82 | 79 | 71 | 74 |
| Mean monthly sunshine hours | 116.9 | 109.0 | 142.6 | 165.3 | 172.9 | 176.8 | 195.8 | 180.4 | 122.9 | 115.8 | 111.5 | 119.5 | 1,729.4 |
| Percentage possible sunshine | 37 | 35 | 38 | 42 | 40 | 41 | 45 | 44 | 33 | 33 | 36 | 39 | 39 |
Source: China Meteorological Administration

== Culture ==
Baihe County's local folk customs include wood and stone carving and clam dancing.
