= Bao River =

River in China

Coordinates: 33°07′00″N 106°55′48″E

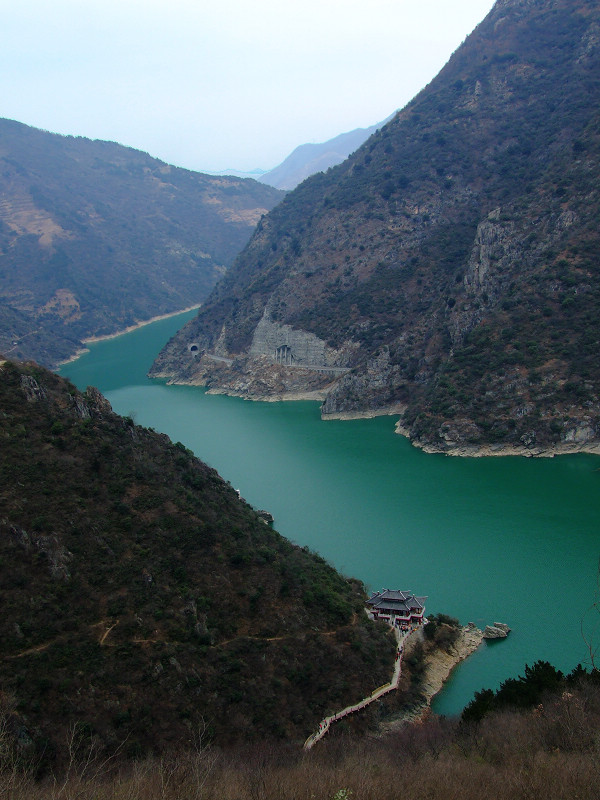
Bao River in Hanzhong

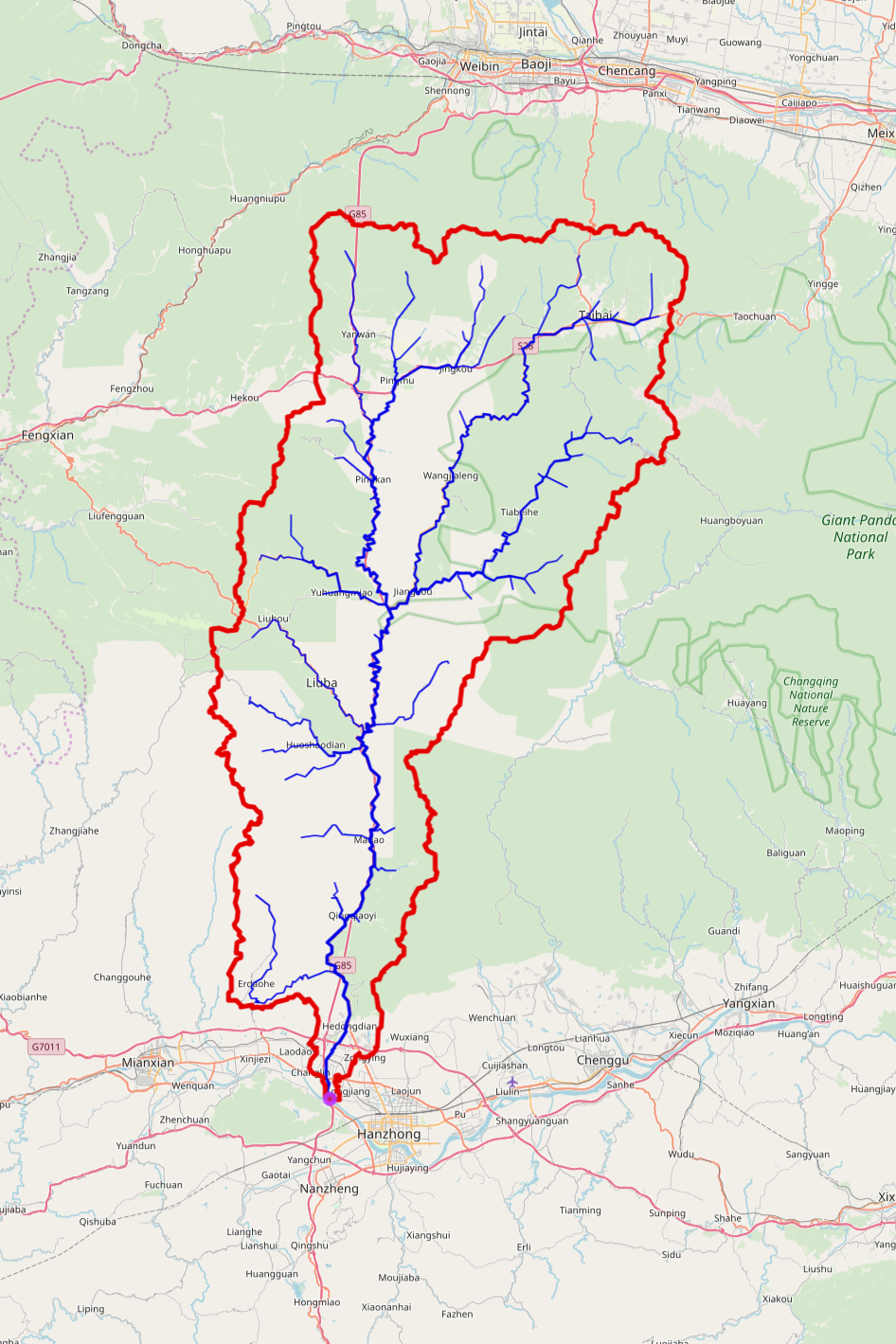
Bao river basin

Bao River, Baohe (Chinese: 褒河), or Baoshui (Chinese: 褒水) is a river in southern Shaanxi Province, China.

== Geography ==
The river has two sources: the eastern source originates from the watershed between Taibai County and Baoji in the Qinling Mountain range.

The northern source comes from the eastern area of Feng County near Qinling, merging with the eastern source near Liuba County, and flows into the Han River at Hanzhong. The total length is 198 kilometers, with a drainage area of 3,940 square kilometers.

== History ==
The Shimen Reservoir (Shanxi) was constructed on the river in 1975. The reservoir has a normal capacity of 61 million cubic meters and a catchment area of 3,861 square kilometers, with an elevation of 618 meters.
