= Wangyi District =

Wangyi 王益区
- District
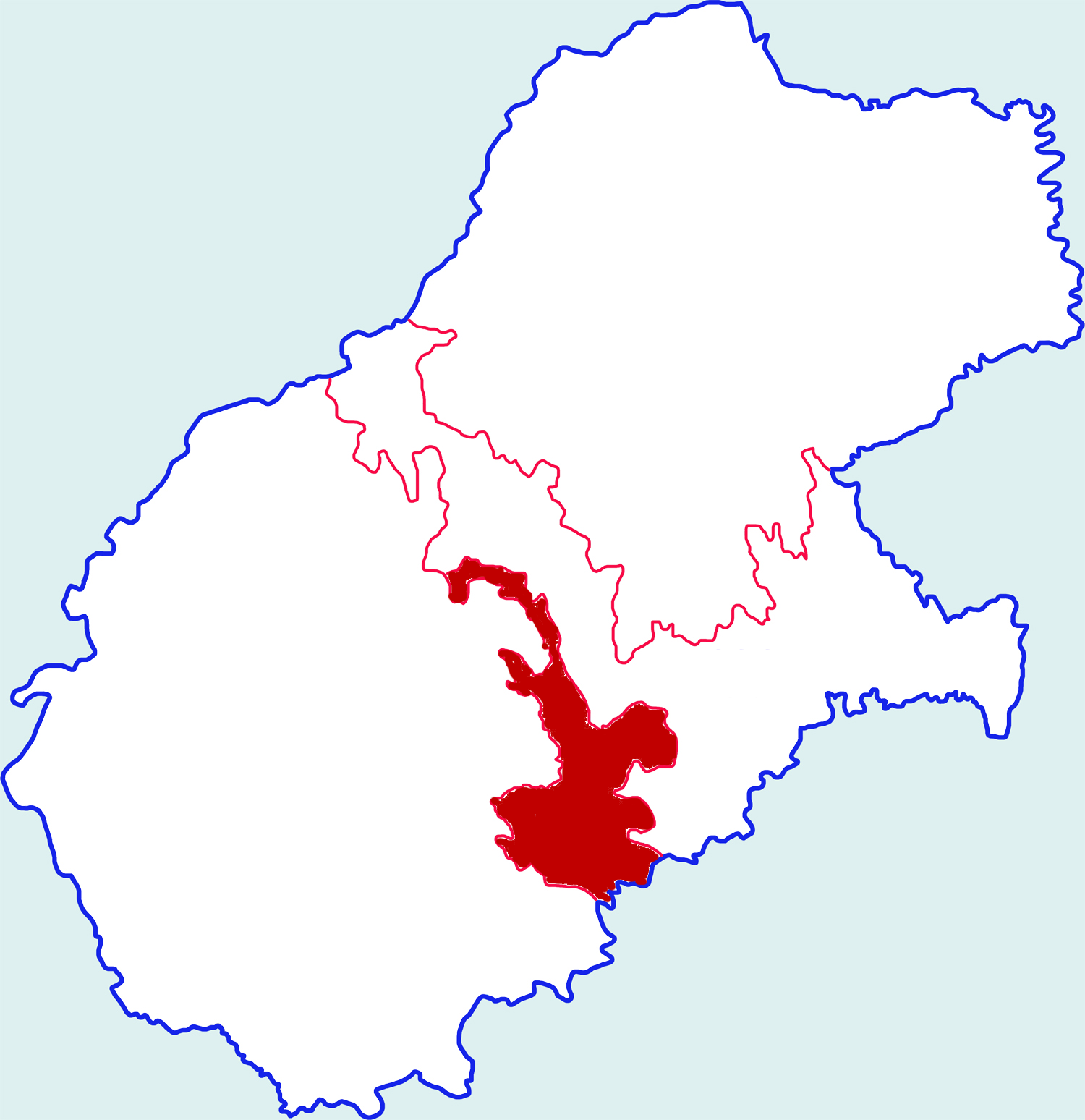
- Wangyi in Tongchuan

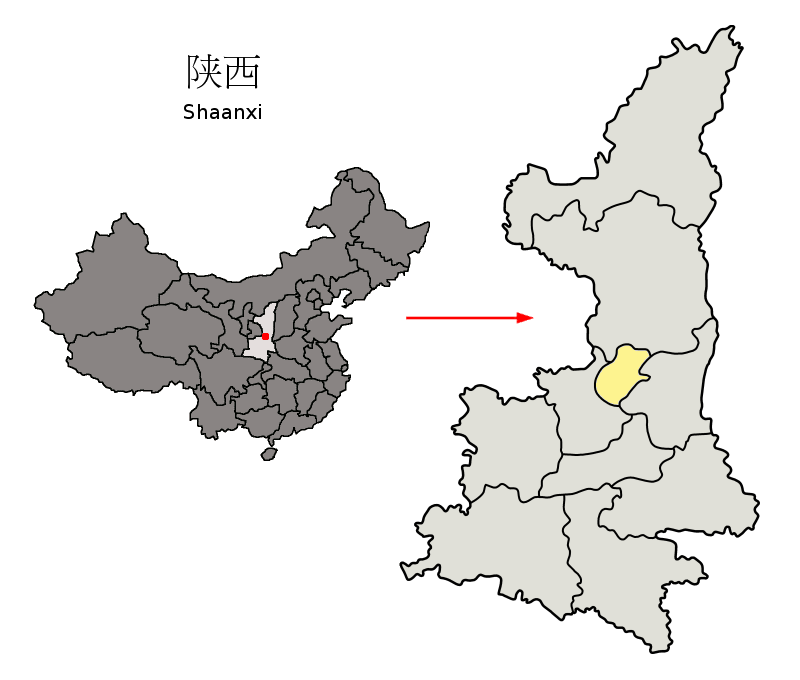
- Tongchuan in Shaanxi
- Coordinates: 35°04′09″N 109°04′33″E
- Country: People's Republic of China
- Province: Shaanxi
- Prefecture-level city: Tongchuan

Area
  - Total: 162.2 km^{2} (62.6 sq mi)

Population (2016)
  - Total: 202,400
  - Density: 1,248/km^{2} (3,232/sq mi)
- Time zone: UTC+8 (China Standard)
- Postal code: 727000

Wangyi District (Chinese: 王益区; pinyin: Wángyì Qū) is a district of the city of Tongchuan in the Shaanxi province of the People's Republic of China. It has a total area of 162.2 square kilometres (62.6 sq mi) and a population of approximately 210,000 people as of 2002.

== Administrative divisions ==
As of 2020, Wangyi District administers six subdistricts and one town.

Subdistricts

- Hongqijie Subdistrict (红旗街道)
- Taoyuan Subdistrict (桃园街道)
- Qiyilu Subdistrict (七一路街道)
- Qingnianlu Subdistrict (青年路街道)

-Subdistricts are upgraded from Towns.

- Hongqijie Subdistrict (红旗街道)
- Qingnianlu Subdistrict (青年路街道)

Towns

- Huangbao (黄堡镇)

- Former Townships are merged to others.

- Wangyi Township (王益乡), Wangjiahe Township (王家河乡)
