= Ziyang County =

Ziyang County 紫阳县 Tzeyang
- County
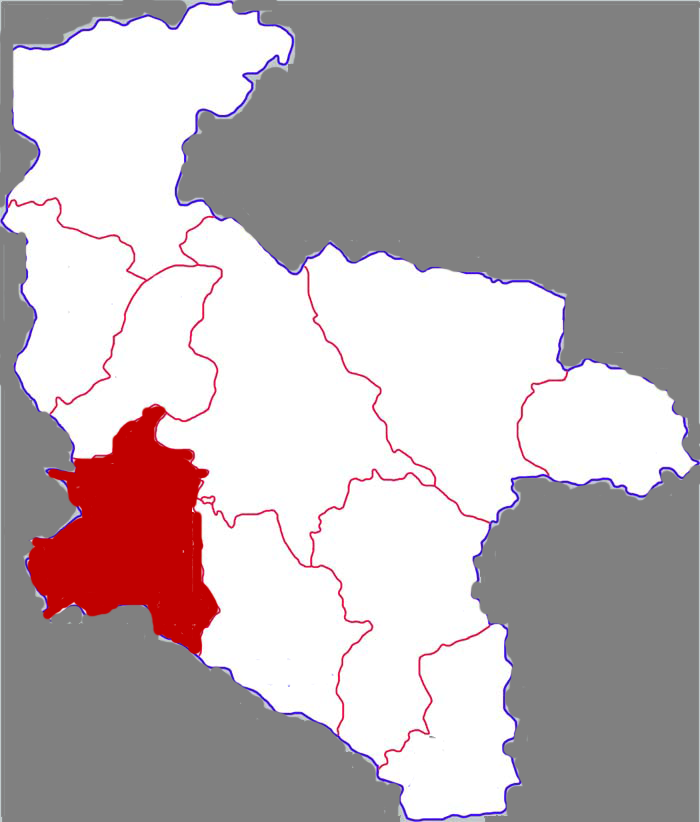
- Ziyang in Ankang

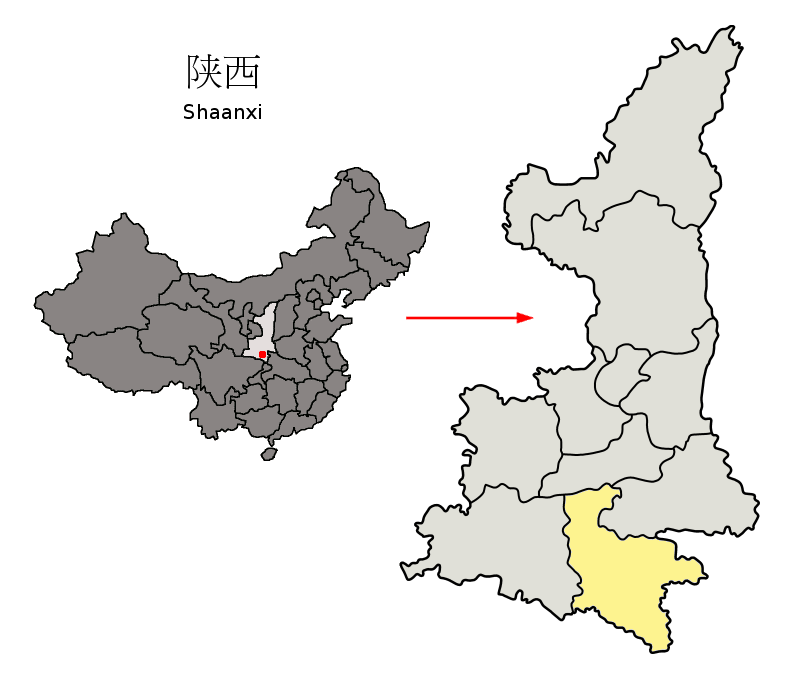
- Ankang in Shaanxi
- Coordinates: 32°31′13″N 108°32′03″E
- Country: People's Republic of China
- Province: Shaanxi
- Prefecture-level city: Ankang

Area
  - Total: 2,204 km^{2} (851 sq mi)
- Elevation: 336 m (1,102 ft)

Population (2018)
  - Total: 286,700
  - Density: 130.1/km^{2} (336.9/sq mi)
- Time zone: UTC+8 (China standard time)
- Postal code: 725300
- Licence plates: 陕G

Ziyang County (simplified Chinese: 紫阳县; traditional Chinese: 紫陽縣; pinyin: Zǐyáng Xiàn) is a county in the south of Shaanxi province, China, bordering Chongqing to the southeast and Sichuan to the southwest. It is under the administration of the prefecture-level city of Ankang.

== Administrative divisions ==
As of 2019, Ziyang County is divided into 17 towns.

Towns

- Chengguan (城关镇)
- Haoping (蒿坪镇)
- Hanwang (汉王镇)
- Huangu (焕古镇)
- Xiangyang (向阳镇)
- Donghe (洞河镇)
- Huishui (洄水镇)
- Shuangqiao (双桥镇)
- Gaoqiao (高桥镇)
- Hongchun (红椿镇)
- Gaotan (高滩镇)
- Maoba (毛坝镇)
- Wamiao (瓦庙镇)
- Maliu (麻柳镇)
- Shuang'an (双安镇)
- Dongmu (东木镇)
- Jieling (界岭镇)

== Climate ==
Climate data for Ziyang, elevation 504 m (1,654 ft), (1991–2020 normals, extremes 1981–present)
Month	Jan	Feb	Mar	Apr	May	Jun	Jul	Aug	Sep	Oct	Nov	Dec	Year
Record high °C (°F)	19.6 (67.3)	23.1 (73.6)	34.2 (93.6)	35.7 (96.3)	38.2 (100.8)	38.9 (102.0)	40.5 (104.9)	41.2 (106.2)	40.1 (104.2)	31.6 (88.9)	25.1 (77.2)	18.9 (66.0)	41.2 (106.2)
Mean daily maximum °C (°F)	8.3 (46.9)	11.5 (52.7)	16.9 (62.4)	22.9 (73.2)	26.2 (79.2)	29.5 (85.1)	32.1 (89.8)	31.7 (89.1)	25.9 (78.6)	20.1 (68.2)	14.5 (58.1)	9.6 (49.3)	20.8 (69.4)
Daily mean °C (°F)	3.8 (38.8)	6.4 (43.5)	10.9 (51.6)	16.3 (61.3)	19.8 (67.6)	23.4 (74.1)	26.0 (78.8)	25.5 (77.9)	20.7 (69.3)	15.4 (59.7)	10.0 (50.0)	5.2 (41.4)	15.3 (59.5)
Mean daily minimum °C (°F)	0.7 (33.3)	2.8 (37.0)	6.6 (43.9)	11.5 (52.7)	15.4 (59.7)	19.2 (66.6)	22.0 (71.6)	21.6 (70.9)	17.6 (63.7)	12.7 (54.9)	7.3 (45.1)	2.3 (36.1)	11.6 (53.0)
Record low °C (°F)	−5.8 (21.6)	−5.1 (22.8)	−2.8 (27.0)	0.1 (32.2)	7.3 (45.1)	12.7 (54.9)	15.0 (59.0)	13.8 (56.8)	10.7 (51.3)	−0.3 (31.5)	−1.5 (29.3)	−8.9 (16.0)	−8.9 (16.0)
Average precipitation mm (inches)	8.2 (0.32)	16.0 (0.63)	38.0 (1.50)	66.5 (2.62)	128.2 (5.05)	155.1 (6.11)	183.6 (7.23)	146.7 (5.78)	160.5 (6.32)	101.4 (3.99)	35.4 (1.39)	9.4 (0.37)	1,049 (41.31)
Average precipitation days (≥ 0.1 mm)	5.8	6.8	9.6	11.3	14.0	12.7	12.7	11.3	13.8	13.1	9.1	6.5	126.7
Average snowy days	4.7	3.0	1.1	0.1	0	0	0	0	0	0	0.5	2.1	11.5
Average relative humidity (%)	74	70	68	71	77	80	81	80	84	86	84	78	78
Mean monthly sunshine hours	80.1	84.5	119.3	147.5	153.2	155.7	179.1	179.3	110.3	89.6	82.1	81.8	1,462.5
Percentage possible sunshine	25	27	32	38	36	36	41	44	30	26	26	26	32
Source: China Meteorological Administration

== Transportation ==
- G65 Baotou–Maoming Expressway
