= China National Highway 316 =

Road in China

National Highway 316
- 316国道

Route information
- Length: 2,915 km (1,811 mi)

Major junctions
- From: Fuzhou in Fujian
- To: Lanzhou in Gansu

Location
- Country: China

Highway system
- National Trunk Highway System; Primary; Auxiliary
← G315	→ G317

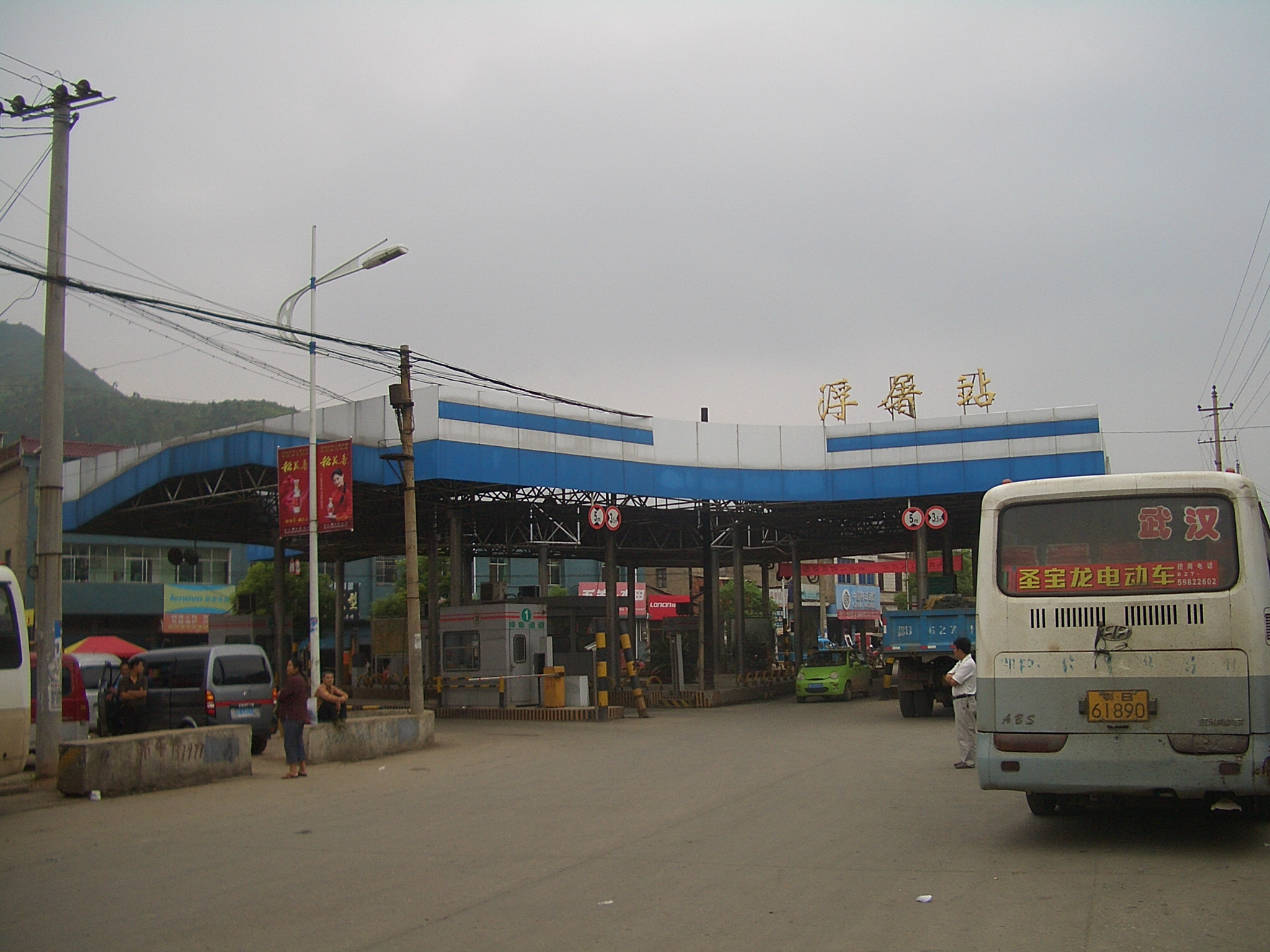
Toll plaza on the combined G106/G316 in Futu, Huangshi Municipality, Hubei

China National Highway 316 (G316) runs from Fuzhou in Fujian to Lanzhou in Gansu, via Nanchang (in Jiangxi) and Wuhan (in Hubei). It is 2915 kilometres in length. The highway crosses the provinces of Gansu, Shaanxi, Hubei, Jiangxi, and Fujian.

In Gansu, from Lanzhou to the junction at Huichuan Town (in Weiyuan County, Gansu, 35 or so km south of Lintao), G316 also doubles as China National Highway 212. On much of this section (Lanzhou to Lintao) it has been converted to an expressway, designated G75 (the Linhai Expressway).

In southeast Hubei (from Ezhou to the junction along the Jiangxi border), the G316 doubles as China National Highway 106.

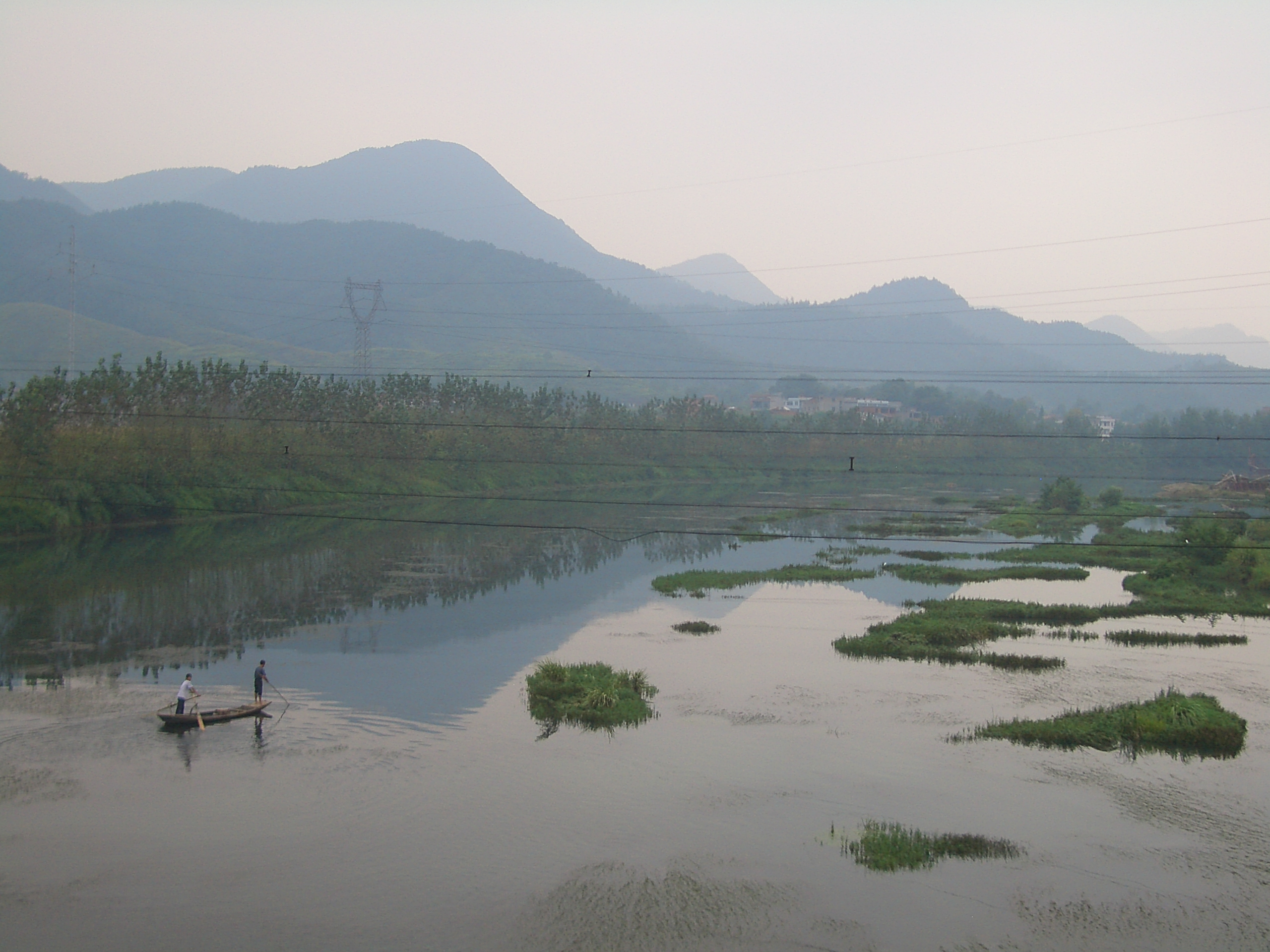
The Fushui River viewed from the highway

== Route and distance ==
Route and distance

City	Distance (km)
Fuzhou, Fujian	0
Minqing, Fujian	72
Nanping, Fujian	187
Shunchang, Fujian	256
Shaowu, Fujian	384
Guangze, Fujian	418
Zixi, Jiangxi	467
Jinxi, Jiangxi	533
Linchuan, Jiangxi	581
Nanchang, Jiangxi	668
Daye, Hubei	953
Tieshanqu, Hubei	970
Ezhou, Hubei	1004
Wuhan, Hubei	1074
Xiaogan, Hubei	1151
Yunmeng, Hubei	1171
Anlu, Hubei	1200
Suizhou, Hubei	1268
Zaoyang, Hubei	1344
Xiangyang, Hubei	1408
Laohekou, Hubei	1486
Danjiangkou, Hubei	1510
Shiyan, Hubei	1610
Baihe, Shaanxi	1703
Xunyang, Shaanxi	1815
Ankang, Shaanxi	1874
Hanyin, Shaanxi	1938
Shiquan, Shaanxi	1978
Xixiang, Shaanxi	2050
Chenggu, Shaanxi	2113
Hanzhong, Shaanxi	2144
Liuba, Shaanxi	2231
Feng County, Shaanxi	2306
Liangdang, Gansu	2341
Hui County, Gansu	2385
Tianshui, Gansu	2532
Gangu, Gansu	2593
Wushan, Gansu	2636
Longxi, Gansu	2694
Weiyuan, Gansu	2737
Lintao, Gansu	2811
Lanzhou, Gansu	2915

== See also ==
- China National Highways
