= Liuba County =

Coordinates: 33°36′N 106°55′E

Liuba County 留坝县 Liupa
- County
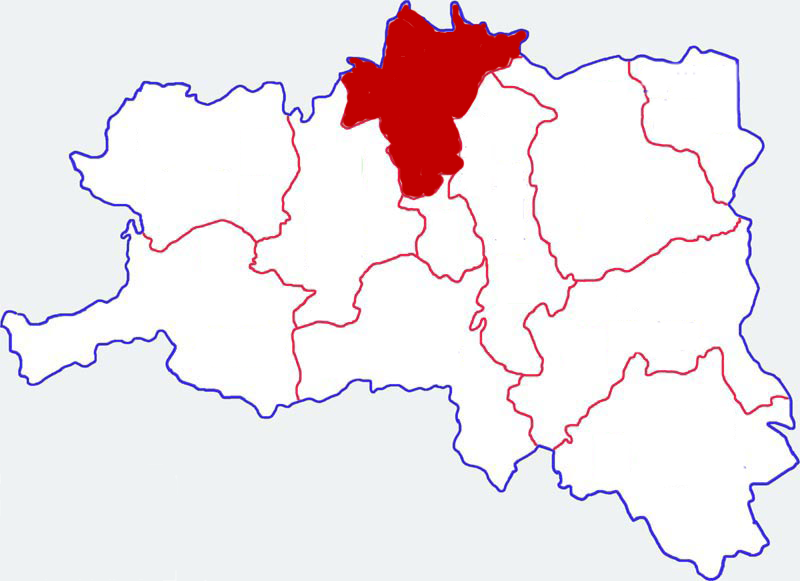
- Location in Hanzhong

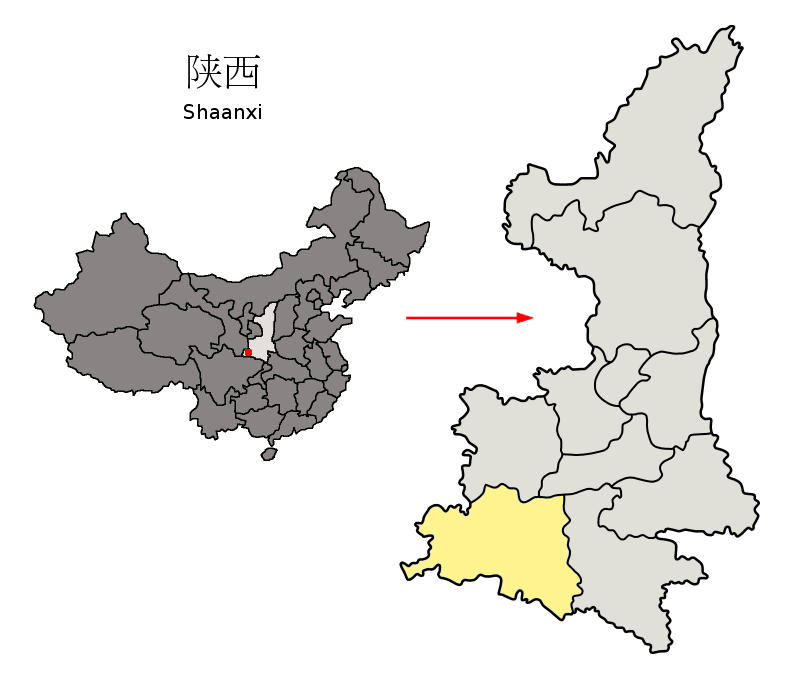
- Hanzhong in Shaanxi
- Country: People's Republic of China
- Province: Shaanxi
- Prefecture-level city: Hanzhong

Area
  - County: 1,970 km^{2} (760 sq mi)
- Elevation: 1,547 m (5,075 ft)
- Highest elevation: 2,610 m (8,560 ft)
- Lowest elevation: 585 m (1,919 ft)

Population (2018)
  - County: 41,882
  - Density: 21.3/km^{2} (55.1/sq mi)
  - Rural: 33,947
- Time zone: UTC+8 (China standard time)
- Postal Code: 724100
- Website: www.liuba.gov.cn

Liuba County (simplified Chinese: 留坝县; traditional Chinese: 留垻縣; pinyin: Liúbà Xiàn) is a county under the administration of Hanzhong City, in the southwest of Shaanxi province, China. It is the northernmost county-level division of Hanzhong.

The Zhang Liang temple is located in Liuba, Zhang Liang supposedly lived in reclusion at the site. There is also a 4000-year old Ginkgo tree in the county.

== Administrative divisions ==
As of 2019, Liuba County is divided to 1 subdistrict and 7 towns.

Subdistricts

- Zibai Subdistrict (紫柏街道)

Towns

- Madao (马道镇)
- Wuguanyi (武关驿镇)
- Liuhou (留侯镇)
- Jiangkou (江口镇)
- Yuhuangmiao (玉皇庙镇)
- Huoshaodian (火烧店镇)
- Qingqiaoyi (青桥驿镇)

== Climate ==
Climate data for Liuba, elevation 1,039 m (3,409 ft), (1991–2020 normals, extremes 1981–present)
Month	Jan	Feb	Mar	Apr	May	Jun	Jul	Aug	Sep	Oct	Nov	Dec	Year
Record high °C (°F)	18.1 (64.6)	22.7 (72.9)	29.7 (85.5)	32.6 (90.7)	34.7 (94.5)	37.1 (98.8)	37.6 (99.7)	37.8 (100.0)	35.3 (95.5)	28.1 (82.6)	24.2 (75.6)	19.3 (66.7)	37.8 (100.0)
Mean daily maximum °C (°F)	7.0 (44.6)	9.6 (49.3)	14.7 (58.5)	20.9 (69.6)	24.0 (75.2)	27.2 (81.0)	28.9 (84.0)	28.1 (82.6)	22.5 (72.5)	17.7 (63.9)	13.1 (55.6)	8.3 (46.9)	18.5 (65.3)
Daily mean °C (°F)	0.5 (32.9)	3.3 (37.9)	7.7 (45.9)	13.0 (55.4)	16.4 (61.5)	20.0 (68.0)	22.5 (72.5)	21.6 (70.9)	17.0 (62.6)	11.7 (53.1)	6.5 (43.7)	1.6 (34.9)	11.8 (53.3)
Mean daily minimum °C (°F)	−3.9 (25.0)	−1.0 (30.2)	2.5 (36.5)	7.1 (44.8)	10.8 (51.4)	14.6 (58.3)	17.9 (64.2)	17.4 (63.3)	13.6 (56.5)	8.1 (46.6)	2.2 (36.0)	−2.8 (27.0)	7.2 (45.0)
Record low °C (°F)	−13.0 (8.6)	−11.4 (11.5)	−8.9 (16.0)	−2.8 (27.0)	1.0 (33.8)	6.1 (43.0)	9.4 (48.9)	9.3 (48.7)	2.7 (36.9)	−6.4 (20.5)	−8.6 (16.5)	−16.0 (3.2)	−16.0 (3.2)
Average precipitation mm (inches)	5.5 (0.22)	11.2 (0.44)	26.1 (1.03)	49.2 (1.94)	84.0 (3.31)	107.1 (4.22)	147.9 (5.82)	143.8 (5.66)	126.2 (4.97)	71.3 (2.81)	23.6 (0.93)	5.6 (0.22)	801.5 (31.57)
Average precipitation days (≥ 0.1 mm)	5.3	6.5	9.3	9.7	13.0	12.8	15.0	14.1	15.1	13.4	8.3	4.9	127.4
Average snowy days	7.8	5.4	2.3	0.2	0	0	0	0	0	0.1	1.5	4.6	21.9
Average relative humidity (%)	65	65	65	67	73	77	81	82	86	84	75	67	74
Mean monthly sunshine hours	120.5	105.2	136.9	172.2	188.5	177.4	180.9	171.7	100.6	103.7	115.4	127.0	1,700
Percentage possible sunshine	38	34	37	44	44	41	42	42	27	30	37	42	38
Source: China Meteorological Administration all-time extreme temperature

== Transport ==
- China National Highway 316
- China National Highway 244
- G85 Yinchuan–Kunming Expressway
