= Shangluo =

Shangluo 商洛市
- Prefecture-level city
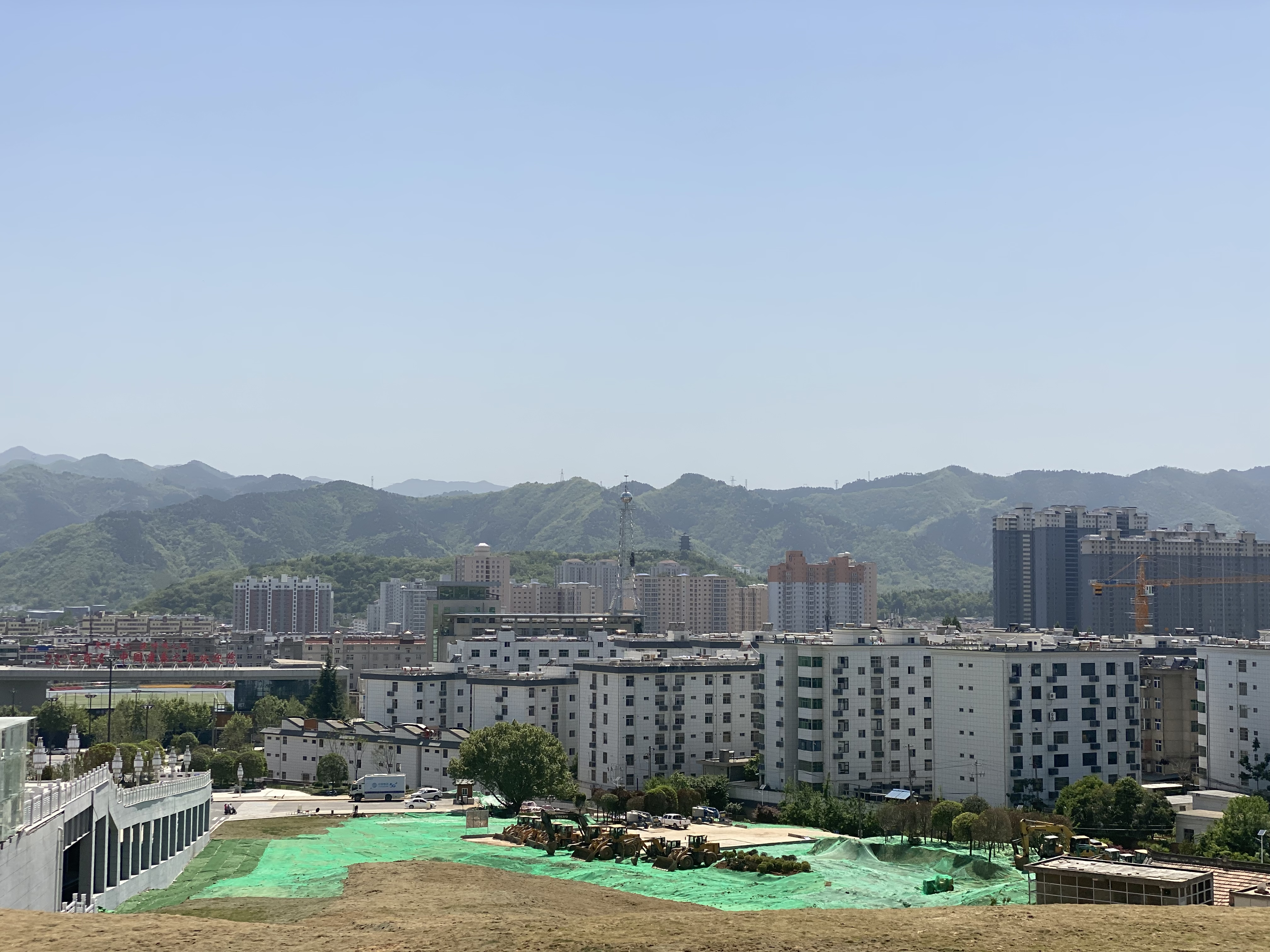

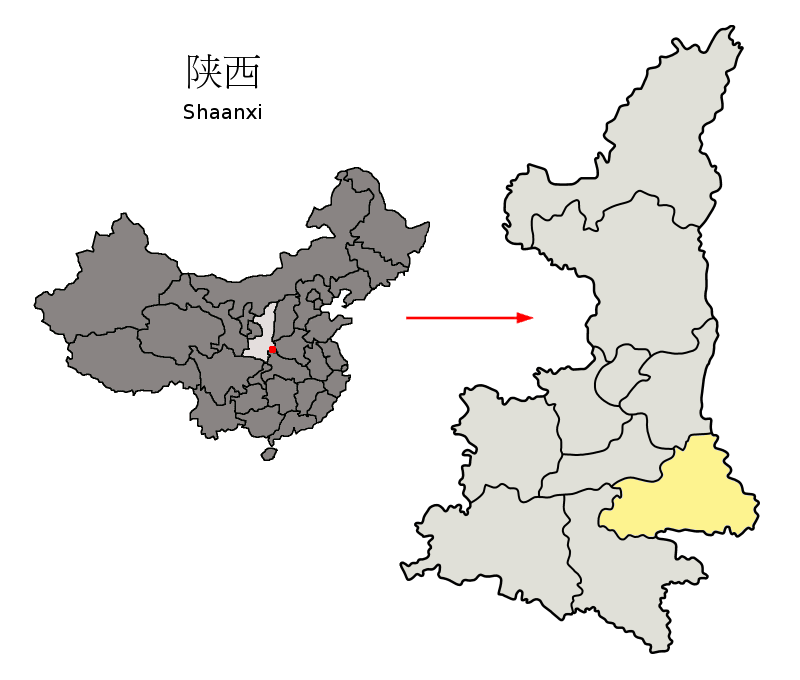
- Location of Shangluo Prefecture within Shaanxi
- Coordinates (Shangluo municipal government): 33°52′24″N 109°55′07″E
- Country: People's Republic of China
- Province: Shaanxi
- County-level divisions: 1 district 6 counties
- Township-level divisions: 4 subdistricts 122 towns
- Municipal seat: Shangzhou District

Area
  - Prefecture-level city: 19,562 km^{2} (7,553 sq mi)
  - Urban: 2,645 km^{2} (1,021 sq mi)
  - Metro: 2,645 km^{2} (1,021 sq mi)

Population (2020 census)
  - Prefecture-level city: 2,041,231
  - Density: 104.35/km^{2} (270.26/sq mi)
  - Urban: 472,978
  - Urban density: 178.8/km^{2} (463.1/sq mi)
  - Metro: 472,978
  - Metro density: 178.8/km^{2} (463.1/sq mi)

GDP
  - Total: CN¥ 61.9 billion US$ 9.9 billion
  - Per capita: CN¥ 26,274; US$ 4,218
- Time zone: UTC+8 (China Standard)
- Postal code: 726000
- Area code: 0914
- ISO 3166 code: CN-SN-10
- Licence plate prefixes: 陕H
- Administrative division code: 611000
- Website: shangluo.gov.cn

Shangluo (Chinese: 商洛; pinyin: Shāngluò) is a prefecture-level city in southeastern Shaanxi province, People's Republic of China, bordering Henan to the northeast and Hubei to the southeast. Part of the Shannan region of the province, it is located in the eastern part of the Qin Mountains (Qin Ling).

== Climate ==
As with the other two anchoring cities of Shannan, Shangluo has a monsoon-influenced humid subtropical climate (Köppen Cwa), with cool winters, hot, humid summers, and ample precipitation by provincial standards. It experiences temperatures more moderate than Xi'an and the rest of the Wei River valley to the immediate north, especially so during summer due to the high elevation. The monthly 24-hour average temperature ranges from 0.5 °C (32.9 °F) in January to 24.3 °C (75.7 °F) in July, while the annual mean is 12.8 °C (55.0 °F). About 60% of the approximately 685.2 millimetres (27.0 in) of annual precipitation occurs from June to September. The frost-free period lasts 200 days, and there are about 2,000 hours of bright sunshine annually.

Climate data for Shangluo (Shangzhou District), elevation 747 m (2,451 ft), (1991–2020 normals, extremes 1981–2010)
Month	Jan	Feb	Mar	Apr	May	Jun	Jul	Aug	Sep	Oct	Nov	Dec	Year
Record high °C (°F)	17.9 (64.2)	23.7 (74.7)	30.3 (86.5)	34.6 (94.3)	36.3 (97.3)	40.7 (105.3)	38.2 (100.8)	38.4 (101.1)	39.3 (102.7)	31.6 (88.9)	25.8 (78.4)	21.3 (70.3)	40.7 (105.3)
Mean daily maximum °C (°F)	6.4 (43.5)	9.7 (49.5)	15.2 (59.4)	21.5 (70.7)	25.4 (77.7)	29.3 (84.7)	30.6 (87.1)	29.1 (84.4)	24.2 (75.6)	19.2 (66.6)	13.6 (56.5)	8.0 (46.4)	19.3 (66.8)
Daily mean °C (°F)	0.6 (33.1)	3.6 (38.5)	8.5 (47.3)	14.3 (57.7)	18.4 (65.1)	22.5 (72.5)	24.6 (76.3)	23.4 (74.1)	18.6 (65.5)	13.2 (55.8)	7.4 (45.3)	2.2 (36.0)	13.1 (55.6)
Mean daily minimum °C (°F)	−3.7 (25.3)	−0.9 (30.4)	3.3 (37.9)	8.5 (47.3)	12.6 (54.7)	17.0 (62.6)	20.3 (68.5)	19.4 (66.9)	14.7 (58.5)	8.9 (48.0)	3.0 (37.4)	−2.1 (28.2)	8.4 (47.1)
Record low °C (°F)	−12.4 (9.7)	−10.3 (13.5)	−8.6 (16.5)	−2.0 (28.4)	2.4 (36.3)	9.3 (48.7)	13.1 (55.6)	11.1 (52.0)	3.9 (39.0)	−4.6 (23.7)	−9.1 (15.6)	−13.9 (7.0)	−13.9 (7.0)
Average precipitation mm (inches)	8.3 (0.33)	12.9 (0.51)	28.0 (1.10)	43.9 (1.73)	69.6 (2.74)	79.2 (3.12)	123.2 (4.85)	106.3 (4.19)	107.8 (4.24)	58.8 (2.31)	25.5 (1.00)	6.2 (0.24)	669.7 (26.36)
Average precipitation days (≥ 0.1 mm)	4.8	5.5	7.5	8.0	10.1	9.9	12.3	11.2	11.5	10.3	6.6	3.8	101.5
Average snowy days	6.3	5.2	2.4	0.2	0	0	0	0	0	0	1.7	3.9	19.7
Average relative humidity (%)	56	58	58	59	64	67	75	77	78	74	66	58	66
Mean monthly sunshine hours	150.0	135.1	162.8	190.9	199.7	200.3	200.5	191.3	143.6	144.8	144.2	155.2	2,018.4
Percentage possible sunshine	48	43	44	49	46	47	46	47	39	42	47	51	46
Source: China Meteorological Administration

== Administration ==
Map of Shangluo administrative divisions
Division code	English name	Simplified Chinese	Pinyin	Area (km^{2})	Seat	Postal code	Divisions			
Division code	English name	Simplified Chinese	Pinyin	Area (km^{2})	Seat	Postal code	Subdistricts	Towns	Residential communities	Villages
611000	Shangluo	商洛市	Shāngluò Shì	19587.31	Shangzhou District	726000	4	122	59	1773
611002	Shangzhou District	商州区	Shāngzhōu Qū	2645.62	Chengguan Subdistrict (城关街道)	726000	4	19	13	406
611021	Luonan County	洛南县	Luònán Xiàn	2830.89	Chengguan (城关镇)	726100		19	22	359
611022	Danfeng County	丹凤县	Dānfèng Xiàn	2407.58	Longjuzhai (龙驹寨镇)	726200		16	6	202
611023	Shangnan County	商南县	Shāngnán Xiàn	2315.44	Chengguan (城关镇)	726300		13	6	164
611024	Shanyang County	山阳县	Shānyáng Xiàn	3532.42	Chengguan (城关镇)	726400		23	6	318
611025	Zhen'an County	镇安县	Zhèn'ān Xiàn	3487.39	Le'an (永乐镇)	711500		19	4	204
611026	Zhashui County	柞水县	Zhàshuǐ Xiàn	2367.97	Qianyou (乾佑镇)	711400		13	2	120

== Transport ==
- China National Highway 312

== Demographics ==
Shangluo Population Data
Division				
Division	Permanent residents (November 2010)			Hukou permits (late 2010)
Division	Total	Percentage	Density (/km^{2})	Hukou permits (late 2010)
Shangluo	2,341,742	100	119.55	2,448,348
Shangzhou District	531,646	22.70	200.95	550,093
Luonan County	441,643	18.86	156.01	453,324
Danfeng County	295,424	12.62	122.71	304,448
Shangnan County	221,564	9.46	95.69	239,461
Shanyang County	422,255	18.03	119.54	449,658
Zhen'an County	275,862	11.78	79.10	296,170
Zhashui County	153,348	6.55	64.76	155,194

== Sister cities ==
- Emmen, Netherlands
- Jinan County, South Korea
