= Qianyang County =

Coordinates: 34°45′46″N 107°12′15″E

Qianyang County 千阳县 Kienyang
- County
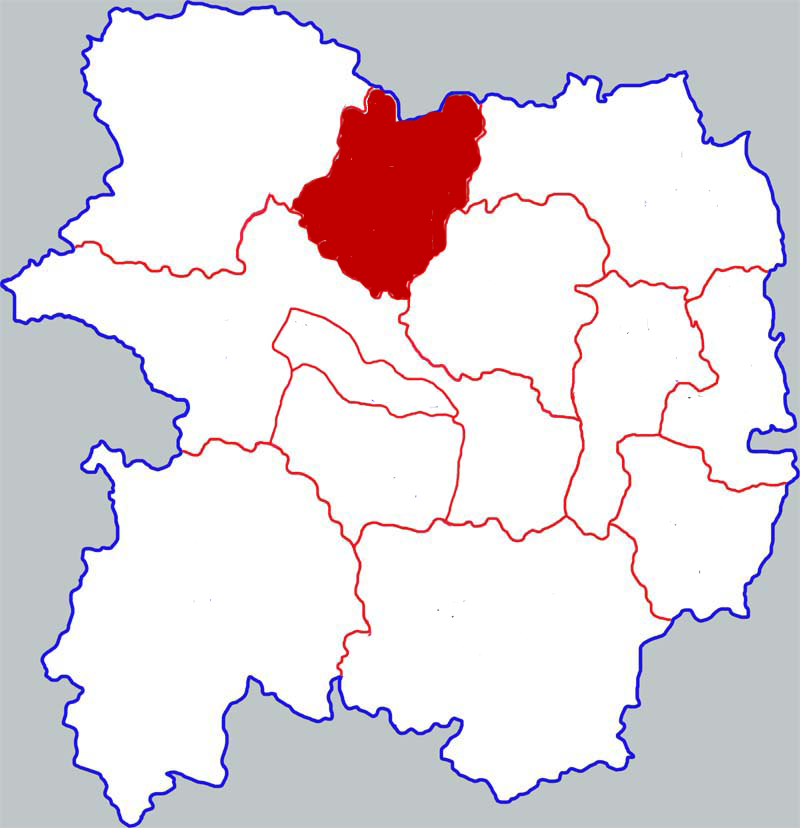
- Qianyang in Baoji

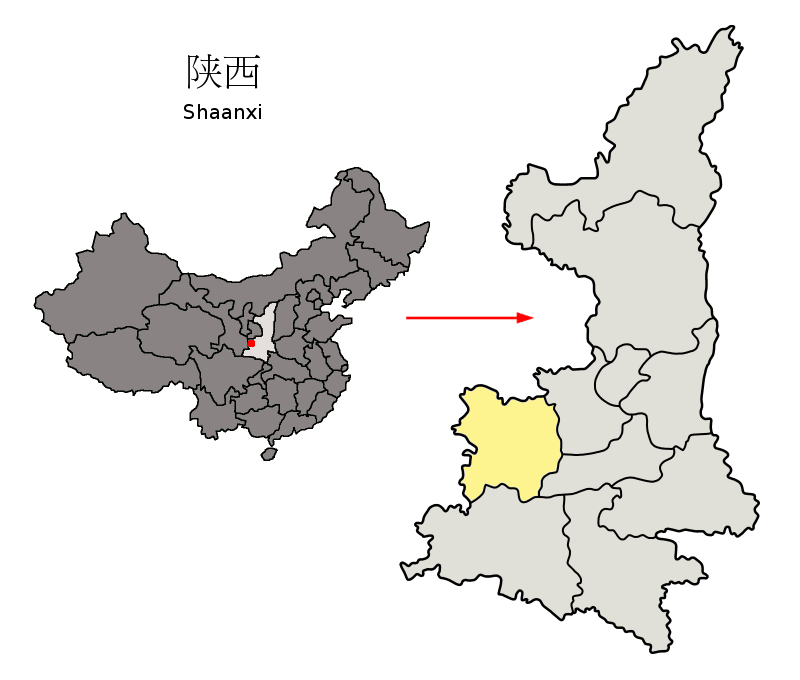
- Baoji in Shaanxi
- Country: People's Republic of China
- Province: Shaanxi
- Prefecture-level city: Baoji

Area
  - Total: 993.93 km^{2} (383.76 sq mi)
- Highest elevation: 1,545.5 m (5,071 ft)
- Lowest elevation: 710 m (2,330 ft)

Population (2019)
  - Total: 125,400
  - Density: 126.2/km^{2} (326.8/sq mi)
- Time zone: UTC+8 (China standard time)
- Postal code: 721100
- Licence plates: 陕C
- Website: www.qianyang.gov.cn

Qianyang County (simplified Chinese: 千阳县; traditional Chinese: 千陽縣; pinyin: Qiānyáng Xiàn) is a county in the west of Shaanxi province, China, bordering Gansu province to the north. It is under the administration of the prefecture-level city of Baoji.

Established in 570 as 汧陽 (also pronounced Qianyang), in October 1964, in order to avoid rare characters, the name was changed to its current writing. Since then, where the name of the place is "Shaanxi", all use "Qian".

Qianyang is considered the birthplace of Qin culture and is noted for its folk embroidery.

== Administrative divisions ==
As of 2020, this county is divided into seven towns.

Towns

- Chengguan (城关镇)
- Cuijiatou (崔家头镇)
- Nanzhai (南寨镇)
- Zhangjiayuan (张家塬镇)
- Shuigou (水沟镇)
- Caobi (草碧镇)
- Gaoya (高崖镇)

== Climate ==
Climate data for Qianyang, elevation 752 m (2,467 ft), (1991–2020 normals, extremes 1981–2010)
| Month | Jan | Feb | Mar | Apr | May | Jun | Jul | Aug | Sep | Oct | Nov | Dec | Year |
|---|---|---|---|---|---|---|---|---|---|---|---|---|---|
| Record high °C (°F) | 18.7 (65.7) | 23.7 (74.7) | 28.8 (83.8) | 34.9 (94.8) | 36.4 (97.5) | 40.1 (104.2) | 40.0 (104.0) | 37.8 (100.0) | 40.3 (104.5) | 31.0 (87.8) | 25.2 (77.4) | 19.6 (67.3) | 40.3 (104.5) |
| Mean daily maximum °C (°F) | 5.1 (41.2) | 8.7 (47.7) | 14.7 (58.5) | 21.1 (70.0) | 25.5 (77.9) | 29.9 (85.8) | 31.0 (87.8) | 28.8 (83.8) | 23.6 (74.5) | 18.1 (64.6) | 12.2 (54.0) | 6.5 (43.7) | 18.8 (65.8) |
| Daily mean °C (°F) | −1.6 (29.1) | 2.0 (35.6) | 7.5 (45.5) | 13.4 (56.1) | 17.8 (64.0) | 22.5 (72.5) | 24.7 (76.5) | 23.0 (73.4) | 18.0 (64.4) | 12.1 (53.8) | 5.5 (41.9) | −0.3 (31.5) | 12.0 (53.7) |
| Mean daily minimum °C (°F) | −6.2 (20.8) | −2.7 (27.1) | 2.1 (35.8) | 7.1 (44.8) | 11.4 (52.5) | 16.3 (61.3) | 19.6 (67.3) | 18.9 (66.0) | 14.2 (57.6) | 7.9 (46.2) | 1.0 (33.8) | −4.7 (23.5) | 7.1 (44.7) |
| Record low °C (°F) | −16.5 (2.3) | −14.4 (6.1) | −7.9 (17.8) | −3.5 (25.7) | 1.2 (34.2) | 8.0 (46.4) | 12.6 (54.7) | 10.2 (50.4) | 4.5 (40.1) | −3.0 (26.6) | −11.6 (11.1) | −20.7 (−5.3) | −20.7 (−5.3) |
| Average precipitation mm (inches) | 6.3 (0.25) | 8.5 (0.33) | 21.1 (0.83) | 35.8 (1.41) | 56.5 (2.22) | 66.7 (2.63) | 105.9 (4.17) | 114.5 (4.51) | 102.4 (4.03) | 49.2 (1.94) | 15.6 (0.61) | 4.0 (0.16) | 586.5 (23.09) |
| Average precipitation days (≥ 0.1 mm) | 4.2 | 5.1 | 7.2 | 7.5 | 10.8 | 10.3 | 10.6 | 11.6 | 12.8 | 10.7 | 6.0 | 2.9 | 99.7 |
| Average snowy days | 6.1 | 5.4 | 2.3 | 0.2 | 0 | 0 | 0 | 0 | 0 | 0 | 1.8 | 3.7 | 19.5 |
| Average relative humidity (%) | 61 | 63 | 63 | 65 | 68 | 68 | 74 | 80 | 83 | 80 | 74 | 65 | 70 |
| Mean monthly sunshine hours | 140.4 | 131.9 | 165.8 | 193.5 | 206.4 | 205.2 | 202.5 | 169.8 | 129.4 | 130.5 | 139.0 | 146.8 | 1,961.2 |
| Percentage possible sunshine | 45 | 42 | 44 | 49 | 48 | 48 | 46 | 41 | 35 | 38 | 45 | 48 | 44 |
Source: China Meteorological Administration
