= Xunyang, Shaanxi =

Xunyang 旬阳市 Sunyang; Sünyang
- County-level city
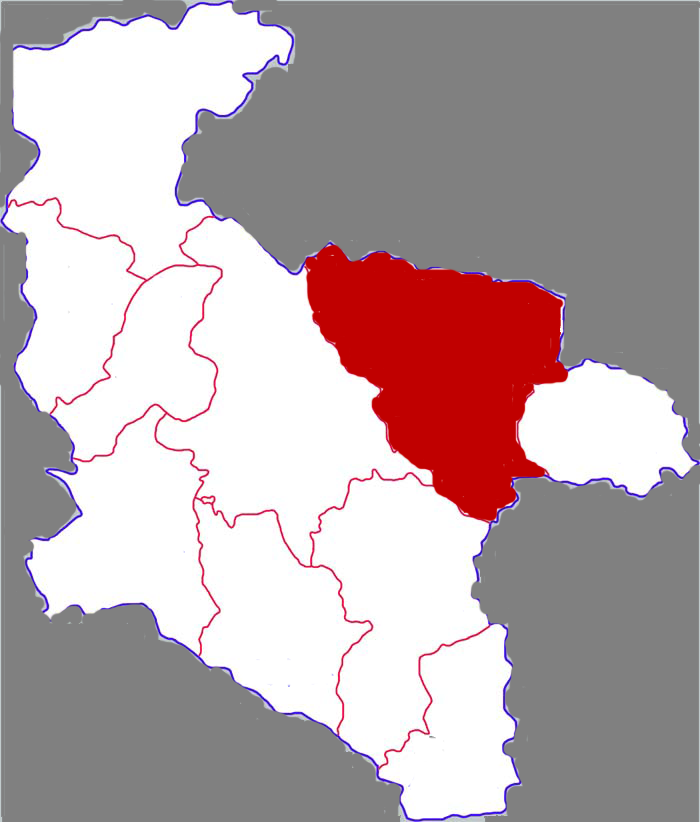
- Xunyang in Ankang

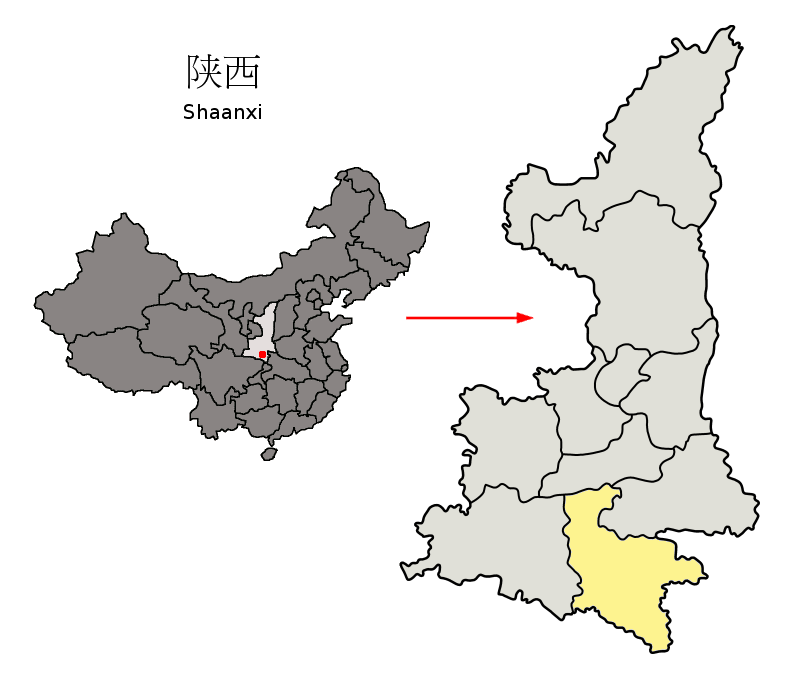
- Ankang in Shaanxi
- Coordinates: 32°50′03″N 109°21′55″E
- Country: People's Republic of China
- Province: Shaanxi
- Prefecture-level city: Ankang

Area
  - Total: 3,540.8 km^{2} (1,367.1 sq mi)

Population (2019)
  - Total: 450,122
  - Density: 127.12/km^{2} (329.25/sq mi)
- Time zone: UTC+8 (China standard time)
- Postal code: 725700
- Licence plates: 陕G
- Website: www.xyx.gov.cn

Xunyang (simplified Chinese: 旬阳市; traditional Chinese: 旬陽市; pinyin: Xúnyáng Shì; formerly written as (Chinese: 洵陽) until 1964) is a county-level city in the south of Shaanxi province, China, bordering Hubei province to the northeast and southeast. It is under the administration of the prefecture-level city of Ankang. Its administrative seat is in the town of Chengguan.

The county covers an area of 3,540.8 square kilometres (1,367.1 mi^{2}), and has a population of 450,122 as of 2019.

== History ==
During the Spring and Autumn period, the area of present-day Xunyang County belonged to the State of Chu. In the Warring States period, the area was incorporated as Xunyang County. In 312 BCE, Xunyang County was taken by the State of Qin following the Battle of Danyang and Lantian.

Later, the area became part of the Han Dynasty, where it was placed under the Hanzhong Commandery. During the Qing Dynasty, the area belonged to the Xing'an Fu.

From 1914 to 1928, the area belonged to Hanzhong Circuit. From 1928 to 1949, the area was directly administered by Shaanxi Province.

Since the establishment of the People's Republic of China in 1949, the county has belonged to Ankang. In 1964, its name was changed from Xunyang County (Chinese: 洵阳县; pinyin: Xúnyáng Xiàn) to Xunyang County (Chinese: 旬阳县; pinyin: Xúnyáng Xiàn), due to the uncommon nature of the previous first character.

== Geography ==
The native language of Xunyang is a form of Central Plains Mandarin. The speaker, He Quangui (1973-2015), was a notable gold miner.

Xunyang is located in the Shaanan region, approximately 220 kilometres (140 mi) from Xi'an. To the county's north lies the Qinling Mountains.

The Han River flows through the county, as well as a number of its tributaries, such as the Xun River, the Xian River, the Shen River, the Lengshui River, the Zhutong River, the Xicha River, and the Shu River.

=== Climate ===
Xunyang County has an average annual precipitation of 777 millimetres (30.6 in).

Climate data for Xunyang, elevation 286 m (938 ft), (1991–2020 normals, extremes 1981–present)
Month	Jan	Feb	Mar	Apr	May	Jun	Jul	Aug	Sep	Oct	Nov	Dec	Year
Record high °C (°F)	20.2 (68.4)	25.1 (77.2)	36.1 (97.0)	36.9 (98.4)	39.8 (103.6)	41.2 (106.2)	43.1 (109.6)	41.2 (106.2)	39.9 (103.8)	31.6 (88.9)	25.4 (77.7)	19.6 (67.3)	43.1 (109.6)
Mean daily maximum °C (°F)	9.7 (49.5)	13.0 (55.4)	19.5 (67.1)	25.0 (77.0)	28.3 (82.9)	31.8 (89.2)	33.9 (93.0)	32.9 (91.2)	27.5 (81.5)	21.9 (71.4)	15.9 (60.6)	10.8 (51.4)	22.5 (72.5)
Daily mean °C (°F)	4.5 (40.1)	7.3 (45.1)	12.7 (54.9)	17.6 (63.7)	21.6 (70.9)	25.4 (77.7)	27.8 (82.0)	27.0 (80.6)	22.2 (72.0)	16.9 (62.4)	10.9 (51.6)	5.7 (42.3)	16.6 (61.9)
Mean daily minimum °C (°F)	0.8 (33.4)	3.3 (37.9)	7.8 (46.0)	12.3 (54.1)	16.8 (62.2)	20.9 (69.6)	23.7 (74.7)	23.1 (73.6)	18.9 (66.0)	13.9 (57.0)	7.8 (46.0)	2.3 (36.1)	12.6 (54.7)
Record low °C (°F)	−5.7 (21.7)	−4.6 (23.7)	−2.5 (27.5)	0.8 (33.4)	9.5 (49.1)	15.7 (60.3)	19.1 (66.4)	14.4 (57.9)	12.2 (54.0)	5.3 (41.5)	−1.8 (28.8)	−6.3 (20.7)	−6.3 (20.7)
Average precipitation mm (inches)	4.8 (0.19)	8.9 (0.35)	22.0 (0.87)	49.9 (1.96)	83.4 (3.28)	111.6 (4.39)	134.6 (5.30)	109.7 (4.32)	115.9 (4.56)	66.1 (2.60)	22.4 (0.88)	4.1 (0.16)	733.4 (28.86)
Average precipitation days (≥ 0.1 mm)	3.7	4.8	7.4	9.0	11.4	10.7	11.5	10.7	12.2	11.8	7.8	3.8	104.8
Average snowy days	2.5	1.8	0.6	0.1	0	0	0	0	0	0	0.4	1.0	6.4
Average relative humidity (%)	64	62	59	64	70	72	74	74	77	79	77	69	70
Mean monthly sunshine hours	109.9	111.2	161.6	180.5	179.1	186.2	210.3	193.0	119.4	102.8	97.2	103.9	1,755.1
Percentage possible sunshine	35	35	43	46	42	44	49	47	33	30	31	34	39
Source: China Meteorological Administration

== Government ==
In 2019, the county government earned ¥1.877 billion in fiscal revenue, and spent ¥3.994 billion in fiscal expenditures.

== Administrative divisions ==
As of 2020, Xunyang County is divided into 21 towns.

- Chengguan
- Zongxi
- Guankou
- Shuhe
- Shuanghe
- Xiaohe
- Zhaowan
- Maping
- Ganxi
- Bailiu
- Lühe
- Shenhe
- Tongqianguan
- Duanjiehe
- Xianhe
- Jinzhai
- Tongmu
- Gouyuan
- Shimen
- Hongjun
- Renhekou

== Demographics ==
As of 2019, Xunyang County has a population of 450,122 people, who reside in 149,961 households. The county's dominant ethnicity is Han, but populations of Hui, Manchu, Korean, Tujia, Nakhi, Mongol, Miao, Kam, and Yi people reside within the county.

== Economy ==
In 2019, Xunyang County reported a gross domestic product (GDP) of ¥18.705 billion, an 8.4% annual increase. The county's per capita GDP rose 8.0% to ¥42,982. 10.6% of the county's GDP came from its primary sector, 52.5% came from its secondary sector, and 36.9% came from its tertiary sector. The county's public sector accounted for 41.9% of its GDP.

=== Agriculture ===
The county's main agricultural products include various grains, oils, tobacco, and vegetables. In 2019, the county had about 1 million heads of poultry, 205 thousand heads of swine, 134 thousand heads of goats, and 67 thousand heads of cattle. The county also has sizable aquaculture and forestry industries.

=== Industry ===
Major industries in Xinyang County include the production of medicine, cement and building materials, hydropower, equipment manufacturing, tobacco, food products, and mining. Xunyang County is home to deposits of mercury, antimony, aluminum, zinc, gold, barite, and slate.

=== Retail ===
In 2019, the county experienced a total of ¥5.757 billion in consumer retail sales.

== Transport ==
=== Road ===
National Highway 316 passes through the county. The Xikang Expressway, part of the G65 Baotou–Maoming Expressway, passes through the county. Shaanxi Provincial Highway 102 also passes through Xunyang County.

=== Rail ===
14 train stations serve the county, which is home to 128 kilometers of railroad. The Xiangyang–Chongqing railway passes through Xunyang County, as does the Xi'an–Ankang railway.
