= Southern Shaanxi =

Portion of Shaanxi province, China

Coordinates: 33.0°N 108.5°E

Shaannan (simplified Chinese: 陕南; traditional Chinese: 陝南; pinyin: Shǎnnán) or Southern Shaanxi refers to the portion of China's Shaanxi province south of the Qinling Mountains. Its name derives from the province's abbreviation "Shaan" (陕) combined with the word "Nan" (南, lit. "south"), its geographical location within the province.

In the Yuan Dynasty, the area began to be merged with what is the Guanzhong Plain to form Shaanxi province. The Qinling Mountains, as a geographic barrier, has also created major differences in climate, cultural traditions and dialects between Shaannan and the other parts of Shaanxi, and thus there is some similarity between Shaannan and Sichuan.

== Geography ==
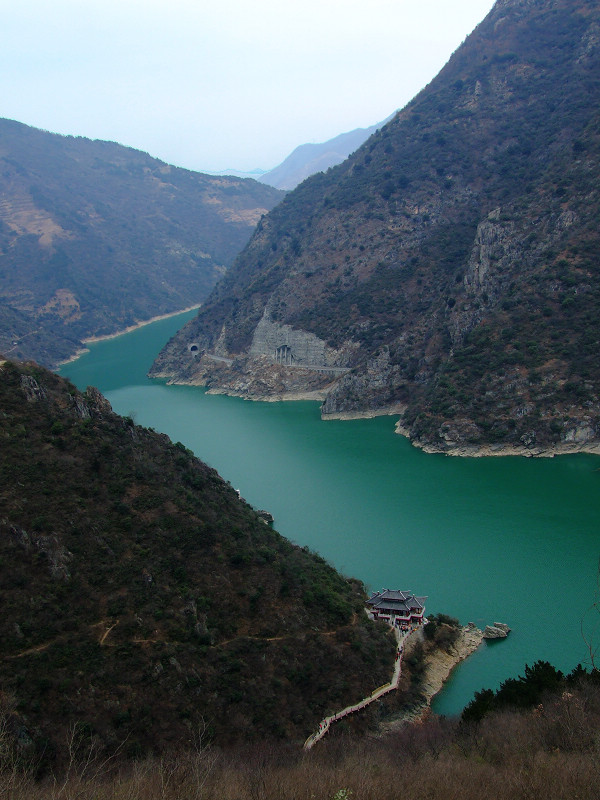
Bao River in Hanzhong

The region is mountainous, and was historically part of the Ba–Shu region. It is geographically considered part of the Sichuan Basin's northern fringe and the three prefectural cities in the Shaannan region are mainly based along the valleys and drainage basins of the Han River's tributaries, all part of the Yangtze river system. The only exception is the Luonan County in northern Shangluo, which is based around the upper Luo River and is part of the Yellow River system.

=== Cities ===
- Hanzhong
- Ankang
- Shangluo

== Culture ==
The Shaannan dialects belongs to the Northern Chinese group, and forms a transition between the Southwestern and Central Plains dialects. For the most part, the native dialects of Shaannan are divided into the Qinlong and Guanzhong groups of the Central Plains dialect. The Sichuanese group of the Southwestern dialect are mostly "guest dialects" brought in by large influx of migrants from Hubei, Hunan and northern Guangdong during the early Ming and early Qing dynasties.

== Transportation ==
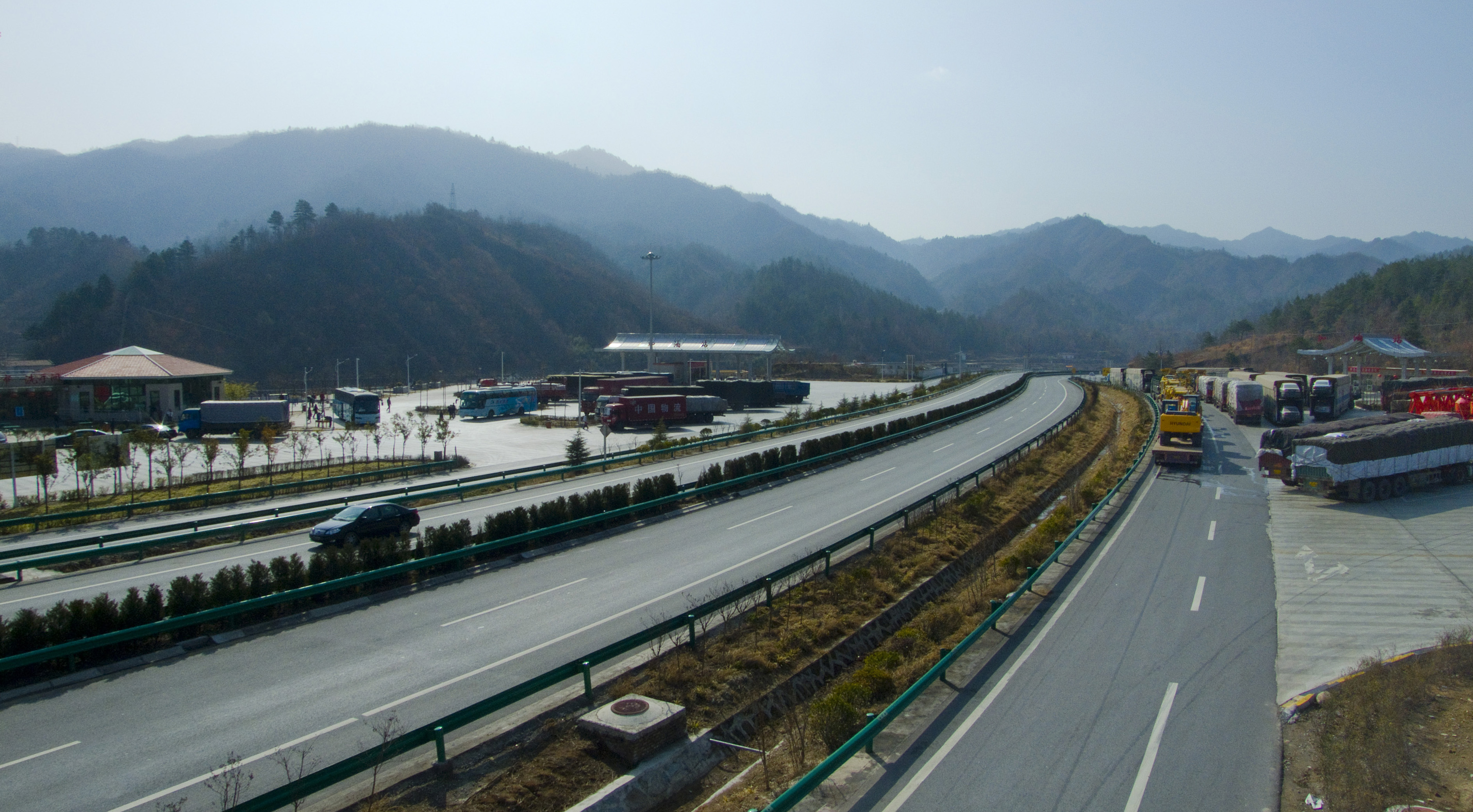
Expressway in Ningshan

National Roads:

- G108
- G210
- G312
- G316

Expressways:

- Xihan Expressway (Xi'an—Hanzhong)
- Xikang Expressway (Xi'an—Ankang)

Railways:

- Xi'an–Ankang Railway
- Yangpingguan–Ankang Railway
- Xiangyang–Chongqing Railway

== See also ==
- Shaanbei
- Guanzhong
