= Hanzhong railway station =

Railway station in Hanzhong, China

Hanzhong 汉中
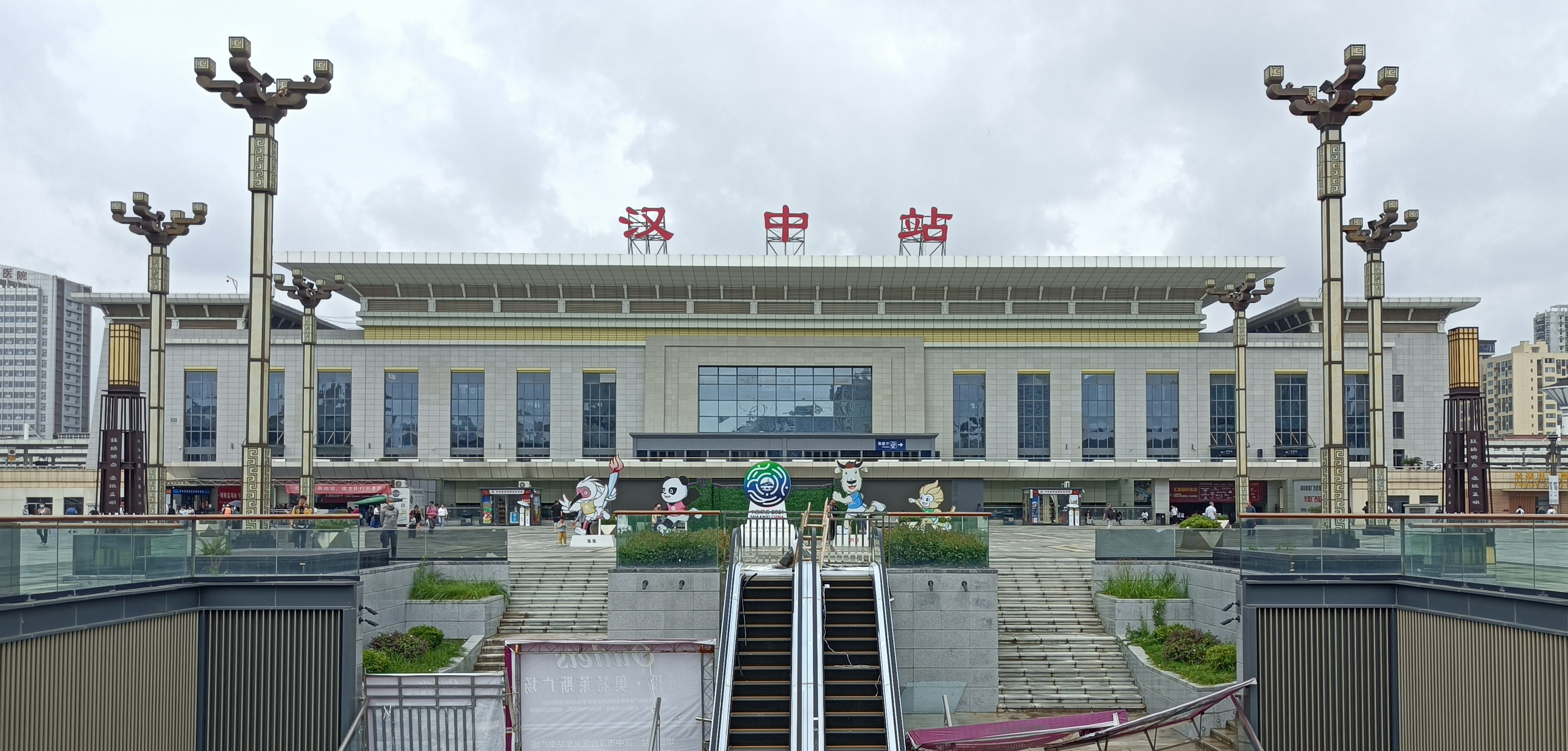
- The station in 2021

General information
- Location: Hantai District, Hanzhong, Shaanxi; China
- Coordinates: 33.0920°N 107.0256°E
- Lines: Yangpingguan–Ankang railway Xi'an–Chengdu high-speed railway Hanzhong–Bazhong–Nanchong high-speed railway (under construction)

History
- Opened: October 1971
Location

Hanzhong railway station is a railway station in Hantai District, Hanzhong, Shaanxi.

== History ==
The station opened in October 1971 with the Yangpingguan–Ankang railway.

On 1 October 2009, the refurbishment of the station began in preparation for construction of the Xi'an–Chengdu high-speed railway. This work was completed and the station reopened on 16 January 2013.

== Future ==
The under construction Hanzhong–Bazhong–Nanchong high-speed railway will serve this station.

Preceding station	China Railway	Following station
Mianxian towards Yangpingguan	Yangpingguan–Ankang railway	Chenggu towards Ankang
Preceding station	China Railway High-speed	Following station
Chenggu North towards Xi'an North	Xi'an–Chengdu high-speed railway	Ningqiang South towards Chengdu East
