= Yangpingguan =

Yangpingguan 阳平关镇
- Town
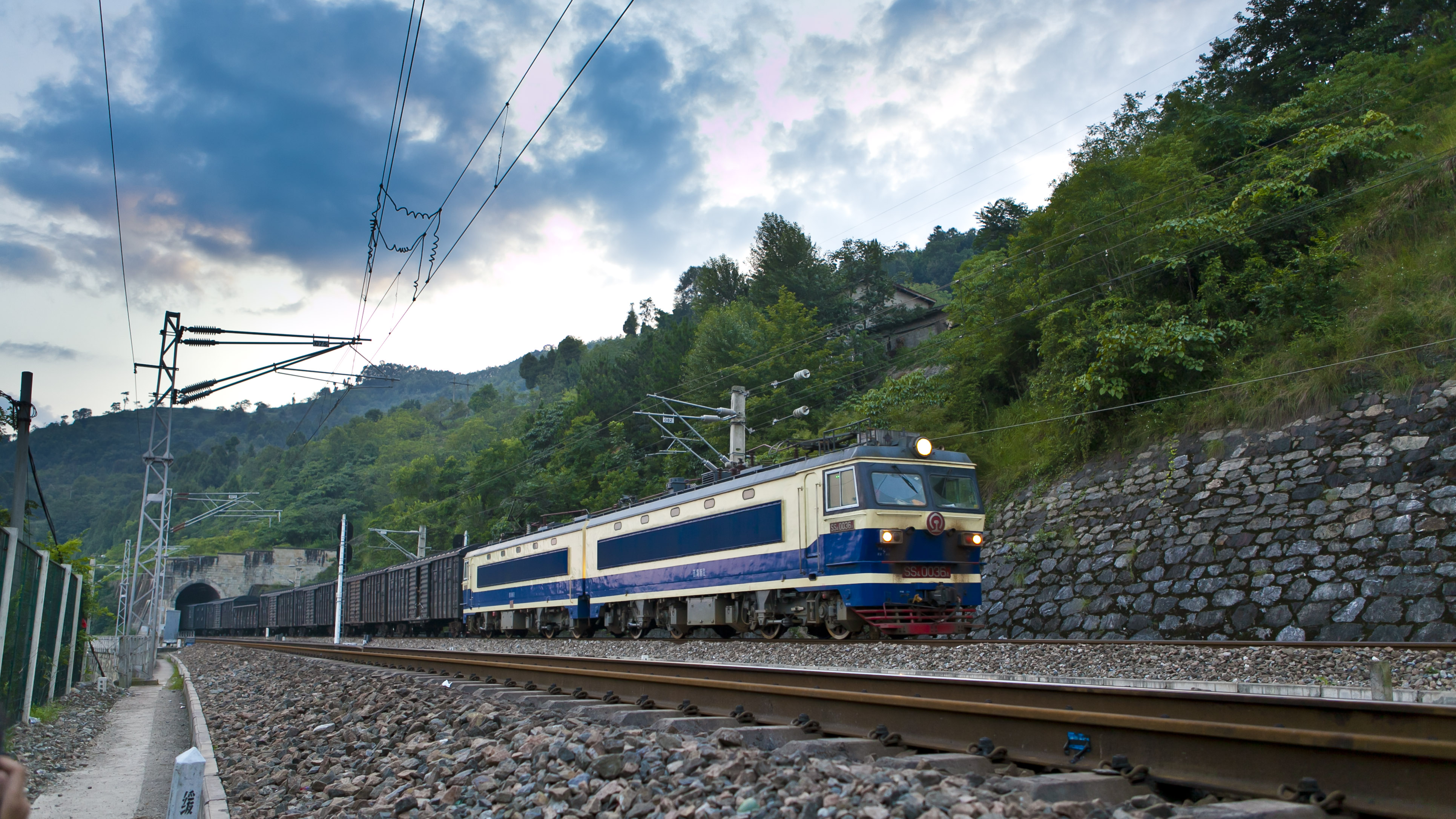
- Interactive map of Yangpingguan
- Coordinates: 32°57′47″N 106°03′12″E
- Country: People's Republic of China
- Province: Shaanxi
- Prefecture-level city: Hanzhong
- County: Ningqiang
- Elevation: 592 m (1,942 ft)
- Time zone: UTC+8 (China Standard)

Yangpingguan (simplified Chinese: 阳平关; traditional Chinese: 陽平關; pinyin: Yángpíngguān; lit. 'Yangping Pass') is a town in central Ningqiang County, in southwestern Shaanxi province, China. The town has an area of 116 square kilometres (45 sq mi), in which there are 1 residential community (社区) and 20 villages holding a total population of 26,000. The town is located 27.3 kilometres (17.0 mi) from the county seat and is near the trisection point of Shaanxi, Sichuan and Gansu, in the upper Jialing River Valley. The town is named after the pass between the Qin Mountains to the north and the Daba Mountains to the south, which has traditionally been the main entry point intofthe Sichuan Basin from the north. The ancient Sichuan Trail passed through the town. The Baoji–Chengdu and Yangpingguan–Ankang railways intersect at Yangpingguan.

== History ==
During the Three Kingdoms period, a number of military engagements were waged in and around Yangpingguan, including Cao Cao's conquest of Zhang Lu in the Battle of Yangping, Liu Bei's Hanzhong Campaign and the Battle of Mount Dingjun at the nearby Dingjun Mountain. In the Tang dynasty, Yangpingguan was a part of Sanquan county. Sanquan county was subordinate to the central government. Sanquan county was close to shudi county, which was convenient to strengthen the management of the Qiang people. Why is the place name three springs, only because in its territory there is a three-spring Longmen cave, there are three springs, Longmen cave, there are a large number of literati poems, but later during the cultural revolution was destroyed.

Yangpingguan landmark-Jigongshan, the Yamagata such as rooster's comb, so known as Jigongshan. Another well-known place, the drum stage, was guarded by the Tang army, with troops stationed there, leaving a platform where the army used to beat drums, but it has now been destroyed. Another characteristic of Yangpingguan is the huiminggou, where many Hui people live and a large number of Hui people move out of Gansu Province around Qianchu. some of them came to Yangpingguan and settled in the huiminggou, where they built mosques.

Yangpingguan can flourish, ancient Jialing river, water trade, modern railway, has just been built by the prosperity of a time, in 2008, an earthquake occurred in may 12, was the state aid, to flourish.

== See also ==
- Yangpingguan railway station
- Battle of Yangping
