= Yangpingguan–Ankang railway =

Railway line in Shaanxi, China

Yangpingguan–Ankang railway (simplified Chinese: 阳安铁路; traditional Chinese: 陽安鐵路; pinyin: Yáng'ān tiělù)

Overview
- Status: Active
- Termini: Yangpingguan; Ankang
- Stations: 38 active

Service
- Type: Heavy rail Regional rail
- System: China Railway
- Operator(s): China Railway Xi'an Group

Technical
- Line length: 357 km (222 mi)
- Track gauge: 1,435 mm (4 ft 8 1/2 in) standard gauge
- Minimum radius: 450 m (1,480 ft) to 600 m (2,000 ft)
- Electrification: 25 kV 50 Hz AC (overhead line)
- Operating speed: 120 kilometres per hour (75 mph)
- Maximum incline: 0.6%

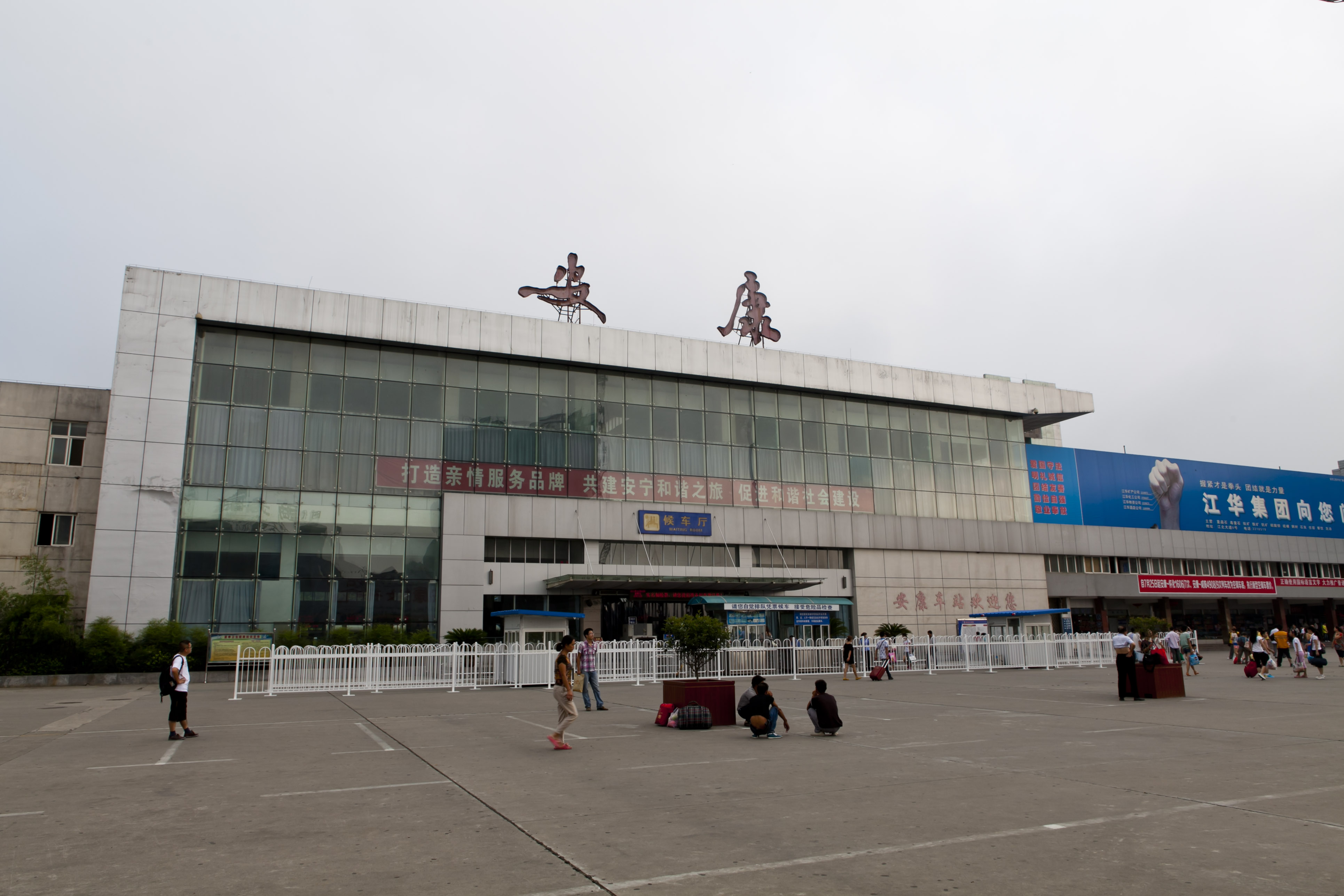
Ankang railway station.

The Yangpingguan–Ankang railway or Yang'an railway (simplified Chinese: 阳安铁路; traditional Chinese: 陽安鐵路; pinyin: Yáng'ān tiělù), is a single-track, electrified railroad in China between Yangpingguan and Ankang in southern Shaanxi Province. The line, 356 km (221 mi) in length, follows the upper reaches of the Han River and was built from 1969 to 1972. Major cities and towns along route include Yangpingguan, Mian County, Hanzhong, Chenggu, Yang County, Xixiang, Shiquan, Hanyin and Ankang.

== History ==
=== Early planning ===
As early as 1944 and 1945, the Ministry of Communications of the Republic of China sent a survey team to survey the railway from Guangyuan, Sichuan Province to Xiangyang, Hubei Province, but it was not built in the end. The planned route at that time ran from Guangyuan, along the Jialing River to Chaotian, turned northeast, crossed the watershed between the Jialing River and the Han River, passed through Mian County and Hanzhong, went down along the Han River, passed through Chenggu County and Shiquan County to Ankang, and then along the river through Xunyang County and Baihe County into Hubei Province.

There were two plans for the Shiquan to Ankang section. The southern route went from Shiquan via Ziyang to Ankang, and the northern route went from Shiquan via Hanyin County to Ankang. Of the two plans for Chaotian to Mianxian, one went via Yangpingguan and turned east to Mian County, and the other turned northeast from Chaotian to Mian County.

=== Survey and design ===
In 1958, the First Railway Survey and Design Institute began to survey the Yangpingguan–Ankang railway. In January 1965, according to members of the Planning Committee of the Northwest Bureau of the Chinese Communist Party, the First Railway Institute re-surveyed and designed the section from Yangpingguan to Hanzhong. From October 1966, the Railway Specialised Design Institute prepared a research report on the section from Hanzhong to Ankang with the cooperation of the First Railway Institute, and submitted it to the Ministry of Railways in February 1967, and then the Ministry of Railways submitted it to the State Planning Commission and the State Construction Commission in July. In September 1968, the two committees approved the construction of this line and designated the line as "Project 1101". According to the two committees and the Ministry of Railways, the First Railway Design Institute revised the preliminary design of the Yangpingguan to Hanzhong section in January 1969; in July, with the assistance of the Railway Specialised Institute, the First Railway Design Institute compiled a research report on the Hanzhong to Ankang section, which was approved by the Ministry of Railways in 1970. By December 1970, all design documents for this line were completed. From 1965 to the finalisation of the route plan, the design unit surveyed a total of nearly 3,000 km (1,900 mi).

To ensure the progress of the project, in August 1970, with the authorisation of the State Construction Commission, the project command rerouted 110 km (68 mi) between Yangxian and Ankang and reduced the technical standards of the line.

=== Construction ===
The Xi'an Railway Bureau started construction in 1960. After completing the access road from Da'an to Zhangjiashan, the Xi'an Bureau stopped construction in 1961.

As congestion of the freight trains at Yangpingguan station needed to be relieved urgently, the Xi'an Railway Bureau started the construction of Yangpingguan East Station and advance work on the Yangpingguan–Yangpingguan East section in 1967. In January 1969, the construction of the section from Yangpingguan to Mianxi started with the First Railway Engineering Bureau responsible for the construction.

On 7 November of the same year, the Political Bureau of the CPC Central Committee proposed to speed up the construction of the Yang'an Railway. Subsequently, the Ministry of Railways, the CPC Shaanxi Provincial Committee, the Shaanxi Provincial Revolutionary Committee and the Shaanxi Provincial Military Region established the "1101 Project" Command and Military Control Commission to lead the design and construction of the whole project. Participating units included China Railway First Bureau, Bridge Bureau, Electrification Bureau, Lanzhou Railway Institute, Shaanxi Provincial Highway Bureau and Infrastructure Automobile Corps, as well as more than 400,000 militiamen.

During the construction of this line, the total amount of earthwork was 39.68 million m^{3} (1,401 million ft^{3}), of which 27.9 million m^{3} (990 million ft^{3}) were earthwork. The stonework was 11.78 million m^{3} (416 million ft^{3}); Mianxi station, where the construction volume was relatively concentrated, accounted for 2 million m^{3} (71 million ft^{3}), Shiquan station excavated 27.9 million m^{3} (990 million ft^{3}) 1.6 million cubic meters, and Xujiaba Station accounted for 510 thousand m^{3} (18 million ft^{3}) due to the project of changing the river course. The construction team did not realise that nearly half of the line was on expansive soil, which led to multiple geological disasters after the opening of the line. It was not until the 1980s that it gradually stabilised after repeated treatment.

There are 146 tunnels along the entire line, totaling 61.54 km (38.24 mi), accounting for 17.3% of the total length. In the sections from Guandong to Daijiaba in Yangping and from Chazhen to Shiquanxian, the proportion of tunnels reached 60.3% and 75.2% respectively. Due to poor geology, several tunnels showed varying degrees of deformation before and after completion.

A total of 311 bridges were built along the entire line, with a total length of 27.15 km (16.87 mi), accounting for 7.8% of the total length of the line, including 3 very large bridges, 1.83 km (1.14 mi), 72 large bridges, 14.9 km (9.3 mi), 115 medium bridges, 8.0 km (5.0 mi), and 121 small bridges, 2.4 km (1.5 mi). During the bridge construction process, the construction team tested a variety of new bridge structures.

Since there were 24 tunnels with a total length of 11.2 km (7.0 mi) in the 18 km (11 mi) section from Yangpingguan to Daijiaba that had not yet been started, in order to speed up the progress of the project, the construction team spent ¥6 million to transport materials to Mian County, which has a flat terrain, by road over the mountainous area to assemble the tracks and sleepers first, and temporarily erected 104 beams in the Da'an to Chenggu section. As the 66 km (41 mi) between Chenggu and Xixiang did not yet have paved roads, the engineering command took 10 days to transport 10 power cars from Chenggu to Xixiang by road through a large number of sharp bends, ensuring the power supply for the construction. In May 1970, the engineering command mobilised a number of experienced drivers and technicians to transport the class JF steam locomotive No. 3827 and 5 passenger car carriages from Lueyang Locomotive Depot (under the Xi'an Bureau) to Mianxian station, providing conditions for future temporary transportation and engineering transportation.

On 1 July 1970, the track from Mian County to Chenggu County was successfully laid. The engineering team then laid tracks westwards and reached Yangpingguan on 27 September. By 1972, the track had been laid to Xixiang County in February, Shiquan County in June, and Ankang City on 8 October, with a total of 356.1 km (221.3 mi) of main line and 112.3 km (69.8 mi) of station track.

The total investment for the entire line was ¥970m, of which ¥915m was for line engineering, with an average construction cost of ¥2.611m per kilometre. During the construction, a total of 384 people died, 1,512 were seriously injured, and 67 accidents occurred, including 11 major accidents.

The acceptance team conducted a comprehensive inspection of the construction of the line from 28 May to 1 July 1976 and concluded that the line was ready for formal operation.

=== Electrification ===
In October 1966, the Third Railway Design Institute began to carry out the design for the electrification of this line and completed it in December of the same year. In March 1969, according to a notice of the Ministry of Railways and the Ministry of Communications, the Third Railway Design Institute revised the design of the line and completed the supplementary preliminary design in June 1971. In December 1972, the Third Railway Design Institute completed the construction design and began to provide detailed drawings to the construction team in 1973.

This line uses direct power supply and has five substations located in Da'an, Baohe, Shahekan, Chazhen and Hanyin. In addition, the Yuehe substation of Xiangyu Railway is used. The transformer is a single-phase transformer.

Since steam locomotives were not able to operate on this railway with dense tunnels and steep slopes, in March 1969, the Ministry of Railways decided to electrify the line and handed it over to the Electrification Bureau for construction. Construction began in June 1973. On 1 August 1976, the electrification facilities from Yangpingguan to Mianxi were put into use. The equipment from Mianxi to Ankang was also completed on 26 December. Due to the influence of the nearby communication cable project, the equipment on the entire line was not fully put into operation until 25 June 1977. On 1 April 1978, the first electric locomotive started running on this line. Since the electrification construction and line improvement work were carried out simultaneously, there was often interference between them. The total investment in the project was ¥58.4 million, an average of ¥164,000 per kilometre (¥264,000/mi). The completed projects included the erection of 523.2 km (325.1 mi) of overhead contact lines, the laying of 354 km (220 mi) of communication cables, the construction of six substations, the use of electrical centralised interlocking at 8 stations and the activation of track circuits along the entire line.

=== Flood and emergency ===
Between February and August 1981, Hanzhong City was hit by floods, and the western section of the line was also severely damaged. In early 1984, China Railway No. 2 Engineering Group carried out a repair project to repair the Yinpingshan Tunnel and Wangjiagou Tunnel, which was completed in October of the following year.

=== Problems ===
Due to the tight construction schedule and poor geology along the line, geological problems occurred several times along the entire line after completion.

Nearly half of the section along the line was expansive soil, but the construction team did not have a clear understanding of this at the time. As a result, after the line was opened to traffic, 120 embankments were loose, more than 500 cuttings were displaced, more than 20 landslides occurred, and a large amount of mud came out of the foundation.

In terms of tunnels, the Daheigou, Daixiaohe, Jiangjiahe No. 2, Bangou, Malingguan, Caogou No. 2 and other tunnels passed through many unfavourable geological conditions and experienced varying degrees of deformation before and after completion; the Shimengou tunnel collapsed due to the decay of the supporting wooden pillars; the Xinyuba and other five tunnels had rough site surveys and hasty construction due to temporary changes in the construction design. In addition, the tunnels passed through 400 m (1,300 ft) of unconsolidated material, and they were severely deformed many times since the beginning of construction.

== Capacity expansion and transformation ==
In 1993, the State Council approved the "Southwest Railway North Corridor" construction plan. Subsequently construction of the Xi'an–Ankang railway and the building of a second track Chengdu–Yangpingguan section Baoji–Chengdu railway began. In order to prevent the Yangpingguan–Ankang railway connecting the two lines from becoming a "bottleneck", the Ministry of Railways submitted a feasibility report to the State Planning Commission in February 1998 on a development project of this line, hoping to form a Xi'an–Ankang–Yangpingguan–Chengdu railway corridor. The project started in the second half of 1998 and was completed in 2000, at a total cost of ¥940 million. After the development project was completed, the arrival and departure lines of all stations on the line were extended to 850 m (2,790 ft), Yujiagou station was put into operation, the power supply equipment was upgraded and the passenger facilities of some stations were also improved.

During this renovation, the renovation of electrical facilities was still the responsibility of China Railway Electrification Bureau, including the construction of a new substation in Xixiang, 8.3 km (5.2 mi) of new overhead contact lines, 68 km (42 mi) of return lines, 296 new concrete pillars and 13 steel pillars. Construction began on 18 December 1998 and was completed on 27 December 2000.

=== Duplication ===
During the 2014 Shaanxi Provincial Two Sessions, a CPPCC member proposed to build a second Yangpingguan–Ankang line, and received a reply from the Xi'an Railway Bureau in May. On 28 September, the project was approved by the National Development and Reform Commission. The double-track project was designed by China Railway First Survey and Design Institute. The total length is 329.1 km (204.5 mi), and the total investment was ¥18.77 billion. Bridges and tunnels account for 45% of the length of the line, including 176 bridges with a total length of 45.01 km (27.97 mi) and 72 tunnels with a total length of 103.583 km (64.363 mi). The changes in stations include the reconstruction of 17 existing stations, the relocation of 2 existing stations, the construction of 2 new stations, and the closure of 9 existing stations. The units participating in the double-track project included China Railway First Bureau, Sixth Bureau, Seventh Bureau and Fourteenth Bureau. After the reconstruction, the passenger and freight train speeds on the Yang'an Railway would reach 120 km/h (75 mph) and 80 km/h (50 mph) respectively, and the entire line will be upgraded to a Class I national railway line.

On 20 April 2019, the entire tunnel of the Yang'an Railway Line 2 was completed. On 30 July 2019, the section between Xixiang Station and Shiquan Station began trial operation; at 14:40, the first freight train arrived at Shiquan Station via the newly built double track. At 4:30 pm on December 27, 2019, the newly built double track was fully put into use.

== Rail connections ==
- Yangpingguan: Baoji–Chengdu railway
- Hanzhong: Xi'an–Chengdu high-speed railway
- Ankang: Xiangyang–Chongqing railway, Xi'an–Ankang railway

== See also ==
- List of railways in China
