= Shen Yinmo =

Chinese poet, calligrapher (1883–1971)

Shen Yinmo Qiuming
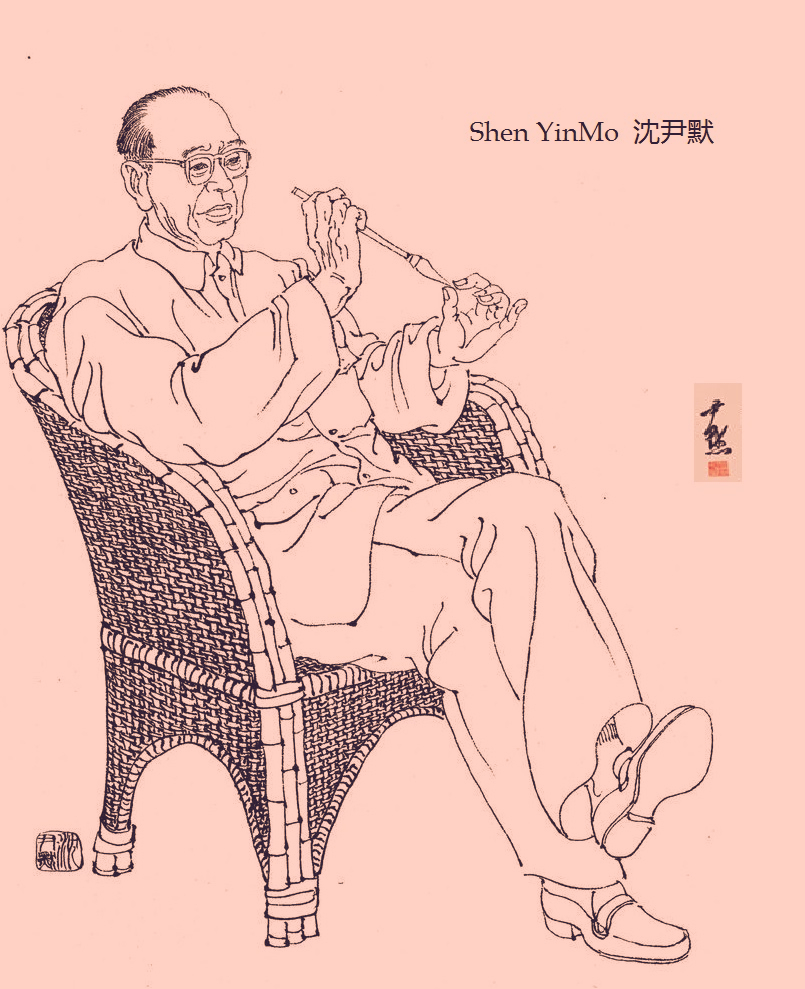
- Native name: 沈尹默 秋明
- Born: June 11, 1883 Hanyin County, Shaanxi
- Died: June 1, 1971 (aged 87) Shanghai
- Occupation: Professor at Beiping University professor at Beijing Women Normal University, Hebei Education Department Head
- Spouse: Chu Baoquan (m. 1947)

Shen Yinmo (沈尹默; 1883 – June 1, 1971) was a Chinese poet and calligrapher.

== Early years ==
He was born in Hanyin County, Shaanxi. He made his name in Kyoto, Japan. He was one of the first to write in the new style and he published his poems in periodicals such as La Jeunesse (New Youth) and Xīncháo (新潮, The Renaissance). Two works that made him famous were Sānxián (三弦) and Qiūmíng Jí (秋明集). Sānxián (1918) was one of the earliest poems written in the new vernacular style. He also wrote poems in the classical style. In his poems, he used rhyme and alliteration similar to the usage in classical poetry. He was a professor in several universities, and later became president of Beiping University.

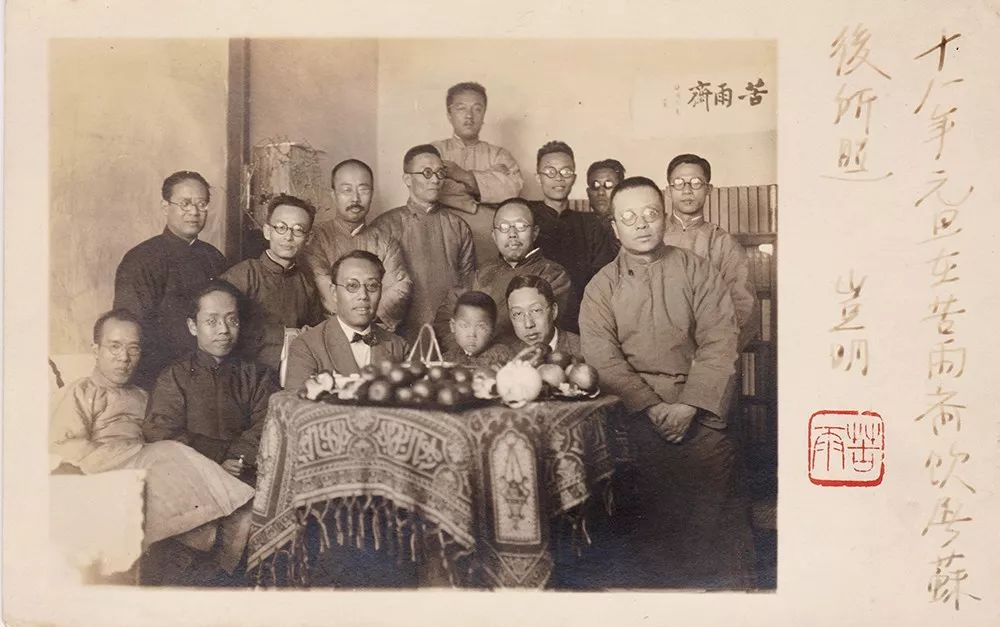

Photo: 1929 New Year party at Zhou Zuoren studio Shen Yinmo 2nd left, friend Zhang Fengju 1st left.

He resigned his post in 1932 due to dissatisfaction with government policies and moved to Shanghai. From that time Shen earned his livelihood from writings and calligraphy, accepting only occasional titular positions in government. When full-fledged Japanese invasion began, he went to Chongqing in 1939, and Chengdu in 1940 and returned again to Chongqing.

His first essay on calligraphy "Five Word Brush Technique" (执笔五字法) was published in 1943. It clarified the respective 5 word and 4-word brush techniques. Following the defeat of Japan, he returned to Shanghai and continued as a professional calligrapher and poet.

Shen Yinmo married his long-time companion Chu Baoquan (褚保权; Chǔ Bǎoquán) on October 10, 1947. They went to Hangzhou for their honeymoon. She was also an accomplished calligrapher.

=== Poetry Example - Sānxián (三弦) ===
The poem utilizes sensory details and emotional elements. Lacking meter and rhyme, it relies entirely on vernacular language characteristic of this period's stylistic shift

中午时候，火一样的太阳，没法去遮拦，让他直晒着长街上。静悄悄少人行
路；只有悠悠风来，吹动路旁杨树。

谁家破大门里，半院子绿茸茸细草，都浮着闪闪的金光。旁边有一段低低土墙，挡住了个弹三弦的人，却不能隔断那三弦鼓荡的声浪。

门外坐着一个穿破衣裳的老年人，双手抱着头，他不声不响。

Translation:

At high noon there is no shade from the fiery sun. Silently silently few walk on the road, only the soft soft wind move the roadside willows.

Inside whose broken front gate is the lawn half covered with stringy stringy fescue, all aglitter aglitter with golden glow? Alongside is a low low wall, hiding one playing the sanxian, but cannot cut off the drumming sound waves from the sanxian.

An old man dressed in rags sits outside, both hands holding his head making no noise no sound.

== Post-1949 ==
Following the establishment of the People's Republic, he assumed a number of official and semi-official positions. These included Deputy Head of the Central Culture Bureau (appointed by Chou En Lai), Shanghai Municipal People's Council Member, member of the People's Congress (national) and member of the People's Consultative Committee. There were also numerous semi-official positions in cultural and calligraphy organizations. He personally established the Shanghai Chinese Calligraphy and Seal Research Institute.

Around 1950, his poems appeared prominently in the literature supplement of the newspapers Guangming Daily, Wen Hui Bao, and Jiefang Daily. He published many articles, poems and calligraphy during the following dozen-plus years until the Cultural Revolution in 1966. On the occasion of the 10th anniversary for the People's Republic in 1959, he presented 115 poems.

He was elected by Shanghai to be a Representative of the National People's Congress in September 1964.

He is best known as a calligrapher. Shen Yinmo's calligraphy stylistic range and techniques span to the Song dynasty masters. He was director of a research institute and published many historical studies on calligraphy drawing upon his personal mental and technical experiences when emulating famous earlier styles.

During the Cultural Revolution (1966–76) Shen, already in his 80s, was tortured by the Red Guards. They were against all non-communist forms of art and culture and declared Shen a "counter-revolutionary". He destroyed all his personal writings and his collection of old calligraphy and manuscripts, though this did not prove sufficient to end his persecution. He was forced to write confessions and self-criticisms, posting them outside his house. These were eagerly taken by people who sought his calligraphy.

He eventually succumbed to the after effects of the repeated abuse at the age of 87.

== Legacy ==
Shen Yinmo is recognised as a significant figure in the 20th-century Chinese literary scene. His achievements were in four intersecting domains. He was an accomplished poet both in classical and vernacular Chinese. He was a celebrated calligrapher proficient in a range of styles going all the way back to the Song dynasty artists. He was prolific and left a sizeable body of work. Shen Yinmo studied and analyzed the techniques of calligraphy brushwork publishing numerous works about brushwork. He expanded the popularity of calligraphy as an art form by his numerous exhibitions and other activities as well as by cultivating younger talent. For example, he would publish poems in popular newspapers such as Wen Hui Bao in calligraphy instead of literary journal.

== Publications (partial list) ==
1918 - Poem Sānxián (三弦), published in La Jeunesse

1929 - Qiu Ming collected poems 2 volumes. 《秋明集》,上下二册,由北京书局出版.

1943 - Five Word Brush Technique《执笔五字法》分清了五字执笔法. His first publication on calligraphy techniques.

1946 - Return Home 《归来集》, collection completed October following return to Shanghai.

1951 - additional Qiu Ming poems《秋明室杂诗》及《秋明长短句》

1951 - About Calligraphy《谈书法》

View of Calligraphy of 2 Wang's《二王法书管窥》;

1965 - Experiences of Famous Historical Calligraphers《历代名家学书经验谈辑妻释义》; published Da Gong Bao, Hong Kong

1978 - Shu fa lun cong 书法论丛, 上海敎育出版社, Shanghai : Shanghai jiao yu chu ban she, 1978.

Shen Yimo Scripture Calligraphy《沈尹默法书集》;

Four Styles of Shen Yinmo Calligraphy《沈尹默手书词稿四种》;

Shen Yinmo Shou Style Verse Calligraphy《沈尹默入蜀词墨迹》.
