= Chenggu County =

Chenggu County 城固县 Chengku
- County
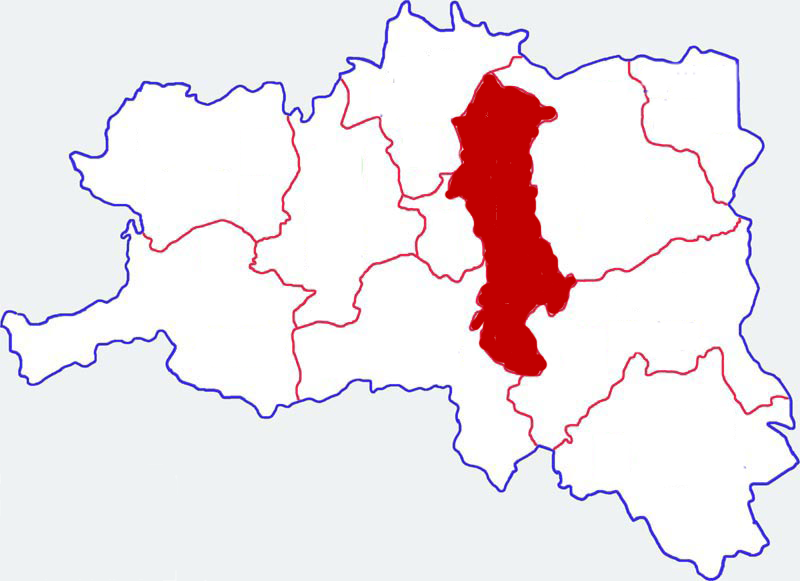
- Location in Hanzhong

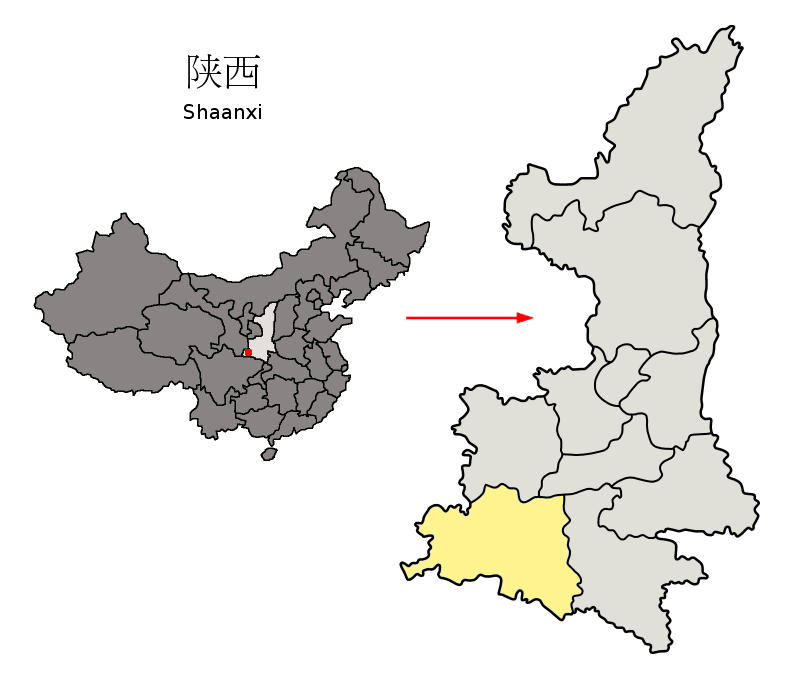
- Hanzhong in Shaanxi
- Coordinates: 33.157°N 107.334°E
- Country: People's Republic of China
- Province: Shaanxi
- Prefecture-level city: Hanzhong

Area
  - Total: 2,265 km^{2} (875 sq mi)

Population (2018)
  - Total: 542,500
  - Density: 239.5/km^{2} (620.3/sq mi)
- Time zone: UTC+8 (China standard time)
- Postal code: 723200
- Licence plates: 陕F

Chenggu County (Chinese: 城固; pinyin: Chénggù) is a county of Hanzhong, in the southwest of Shaanxi province, China.

== History ==
Unique archaeological evidence on contacts with Xingan culture (Jiangxi) was found there at Sucun.

In 619, during the early Tang Dynasty, the county was renamed to Tanggu (唐固) for 9 years, until its name was changed back to Chenggu.

In 1103, the county seat was moved to its present location.

== Administrative divisions ==
As of 2019, Chenggu County is divided to 2 subdistricts, 15 towns and 1 other.

Subdistricts

- Bowang Subdistrict (博望街道)
- Lianhua Subdistrict (莲花街道)

Towns

- Longtou (龙头镇)
- Shaheying (沙河营镇)
- Wenchuan (文川镇)
- Liulin (柳林镇)
- Laozhuang (老庄镇)
- Juyuan (桔园镇)
- Yuangong (原公镇)
- Shangyuanguan (上元观镇)
- Tianming (天明镇)
- Erli (二里镇)
- Wudu (五堵镇)
- Shuangxi (双溪镇)
- Xiaohe (小河镇)
- Dongjiaying (董家营镇)
- Sanhe (三合镇)

Others

- Shaanxi Aircraft Manufacturing Company (陕西飞机制造公司)

== Climate ==
Climate data for Chenggu, elevation 486 m (1,594 ft), (1991–2020 normals, extremes 1981–present)
Month	Jan	Feb	Mar	Apr	May	Jun	Jul	Aug	Sep	Oct	Nov	Dec	Year
Record high °C (°F)	16.7 (62.1)	21.9 (71.4)	31.3 (88.3)	32.7 (90.9)	35.7 (96.3)	38.5 (101.3)	39.1 (102.4)	37.7 (99.9)	37.0 (98.6)	29.2 (84.6)	23.0 (73.4)	17.2 (63.0)	39.1 (102.4)
Mean daily maximum °C (°F)	7.8 (46.0)	11.0 (51.8)	16.4 (61.5)	22.4 (72.3)	26.3 (79.3)	29.3 (84.7)	31.3 (88.3)	30.8 (87.4)	25.3 (77.5)	19.6 (67.3)	13.5 (56.3)	8.4 (47.1)	20.2 (68.3)
Daily mean °C (°F)	2.6 (36.7)	5.6 (42.1)	10.3 (50.5)	15.8 (60.4)	20.1 (68.2)	23.9 (75.0)	26.1 (79.0)	25.4 (77.7)	20.6 (69.1)	15.1 (59.2)	8.9 (48.0)	3.6 (38.5)	14.8 (58.7)
Mean daily minimum °C (°F)	−0.9 (30.4)	1.7 (35.1)	5.8 (42.4)	10.9 (51.6)	15.5 (59.9)	19.8 (67.6)	22.3 (72.1)	21.7 (71.1)	17.5 (63.5)	12.3 (54.1)	5.9 (42.6)	0.5 (32.9)	11.1 (51.9)
Record low °C (°F)	−7.6 (18.3)	−6.4 (20.5)	−5.5 (22.1)	0.7 (33.3)	5.4 (41.7)	13.1 (55.6)	15.4 (59.7)	14.1 (57.4)	9.3 (48.7)	−1.5 (29.3)	−3.9 (25.0)	−10.0 (14.0)	−10.0 (14.0)
Average precipitation mm (inches)	4.1 (0.16)	10.0 (0.39)	24.6 (0.97)	50.9 (2.00)	82.8 (3.26)	96.4 (3.80)	140.3 (5.52)	109.3 (4.30)	131.0 (5.16)	73.8 (2.91)	30.7 (1.21)	6.0 (0.24)	759.9 (29.92)
Average precipitation days (≥ 0.1 mm)	4.2	5.1	8.2	9.8	11.6	11.5	12.9	10.5	13.5	12.8	8.4	4.9	113.4
Average snowy days	3.0	1.6	0.4	0	0	0	0	0	0	0	0.3	1.1	6.4
Average relative humidity (%)	77	74	72	74	74	77	80	80	84	87	86	82	79
Mean monthly sunshine hours	87.2	90.1	136.7	168.4	182.0	183.0	209.5	205.2	116.7	95.7	77.1	83.3	1,634.9
Percentage possible sunshine	28	29	37	43	42	43	48	50	32	27	25	27	36
Source: China Meteorological Administration

== Transportation ==
Chenggu is served by the Yangpingguan–Ankang Railway.
