= Xixiang County =

Xixiang County 西乡县 Sisiang
- County
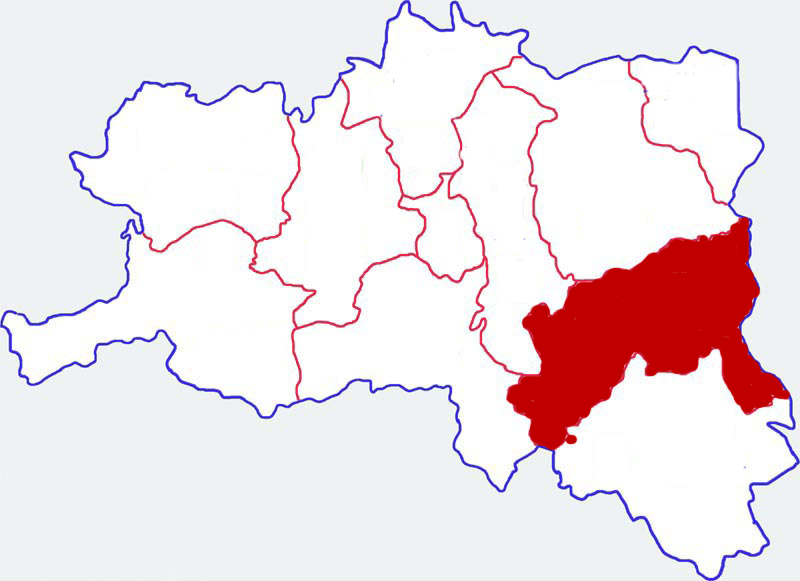
- Location in Hanzhong

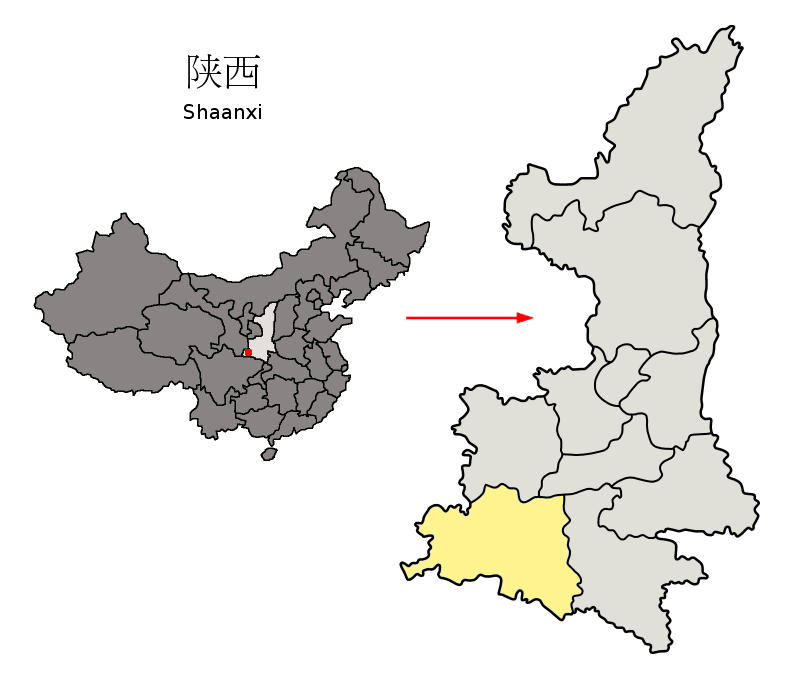
- Hanzhong in Shaanxi
- Coordinates (Xixiang railway station): 32°59′35″N 107°45′25″E
- Country: People's Republic of China
- Province: Shaanxi
- Prefecture-level city: Hanzhong

Area
  - Total: 3,240 km^{2} (1,250 sq mi)

Population (2018)
  - Total: 344,790
  - Density: 106/km^{2} (276/sq mi)
- Time zone: UTC+8 (China standard time)
- Postal code: 723500
- Licence plates: 陕F
- Website: www.snxx.gov.cn

Xixiang County (simplified Chinese: 西乡县; traditional Chinese: 西鄉縣; pinyin: Xīxiāng Xiàn) is a county under the administration of Hanzhong City, in the southwest of Shaanxi province, China, bordering Sichuan province to the southwest. Its administrative center, Xixiang, formerly known as Hsihsiang, lies on the Muma River. The county contains fourteen towns, eleven townships, and covers an area of 3,240 km^{2} (1,250 sq mi).

== Administrative divisions ==
As of 2019, Xixiang County is divided to 2 subdistricts and 15 towns.

Subdistricts

- Chengbei Subdistrict (城北街道)
- Chengnan Subdistrict (城南街道)

Towns

- Yanghe (杨河镇)
- Liushu (柳树镇)
- Shahe (沙河镇)
- Sidu (私渡镇)
- Sangyuan (桑园镇)
- Bailongtang (白龙塘镇)
- Xiakou (峡口镇)
- Yankou (堰口镇)
- Cha (茶镇)
- Gaochuan (高川镇)
- Lianghekou (两河口镇)
- Dahe (大河镇)
- Luojiaba (骆家坝镇)
- Ziwu (子午镇)
- Baimianxia (白勉峡镇)

== Climate ==
Climate data for Xixiang, elevation 446 m (1,463 ft), (1991–2020 normals, extremes 1991–present)
Month	Jan	Feb	Mar	Apr	May	Jun	Jul	Aug	Sep	Oct	Nov	Dec	Year
Record high °C (°F)	17.3 (63.1)	22.8 (73.0)	32.2 (90.0)	35.7 (96.3)	36.0 (96.8)	37.9 (100.2)	40.7 (105.3)	40.2 (104.4)	38.4 (101.1)	32.9 (91.2)	24.6 (76.3)	17.8 (64.0)	40.7 (105.3)
Mean daily maximum °C (°F)	8.2 (46.8)	11.6 (52.9)	17.2 (63.0)	23.0 (73.4)	26.5 (79.7)	29.7 (85.5)	31.9 (89.4)	31.5 (88.7)	25.8 (78.4)	19.9 (67.8)	13.8 (56.8)	8.8 (47.8)	20.7 (69.2)
Daily mean °C (°F)	2.7 (36.9)	5.7 (42.3)	10.4 (50.7)	15.8 (60.4)	19.9 (67.8)	23.8 (74.8)	26.2 (79.2)	25.6 (78.1)	20.7 (69.3)	15.2 (59.4)	9.1 (48.4)	3.8 (38.8)	14.9 (58.8)
Mean daily minimum °C (°F)	−1.0 (30.2)	1.6 (34.9)	5.6 (42.1)	10.7 (51.3)	15.1 (59.2)	19.4 (66.9)	22.1 (71.8)	21.5 (70.7)	17.5 (63.5)	12.3 (54.1)	6.2 (43.2)	0.6 (33.1)	11.0 (51.8)
Record low °C (°F)	−11.8 (10.8)	−7.2 (19.0)	−4.5 (23.9)	0.3 (32.5)	6.1 (43.0)	12.3 (54.1)	16.0 (60.8)	14.4 (57.9)	8.0 (46.4)	1.6 (34.9)	−4.3 (24.3)	−10.8 (12.6)	−11.8 (10.8)
Average precipitation mm (inches)	5.0 (0.20)	9.6 (0.38)	26.6 (1.05)	57.2 (2.25)	99.2 (3.91)	110.7 (4.36)	151.1 (5.95)	126.1 (4.96)	133.1 (5.24)	88.5 (3.48)	34.6 (1.36)	6.9 (0.27)	848.6 (33.41)
Average precipitation days (≥ 0.1 mm)	3.9	5.0	8.3	10.1	12.5	12.6	12.9	11.0	13.5	13.3	9.3	5.3	117.7
Average snowy days	3.2	1.6	0.4	0.1	0	0	0	0	0	0	0.3	1.1	6.7
Average relative humidity (%)	77	72	71	75	76	78	80	80	84	87	87	82	79
Mean monthly sunshine hours	77.4	82.1	124.4	152.7	160.5	157.3	183.4	185.0	106.9	85.0	68.2	73.0	1,455.9
Percentage possible sunshine	24	26	33	39	37	37	42	45	29	24	22	24	32
Source: China Meteorological Administration

== Economy ==
In the 19th century and early 20th century the area produced silk which was exported to Gansu.

== Transportation ==
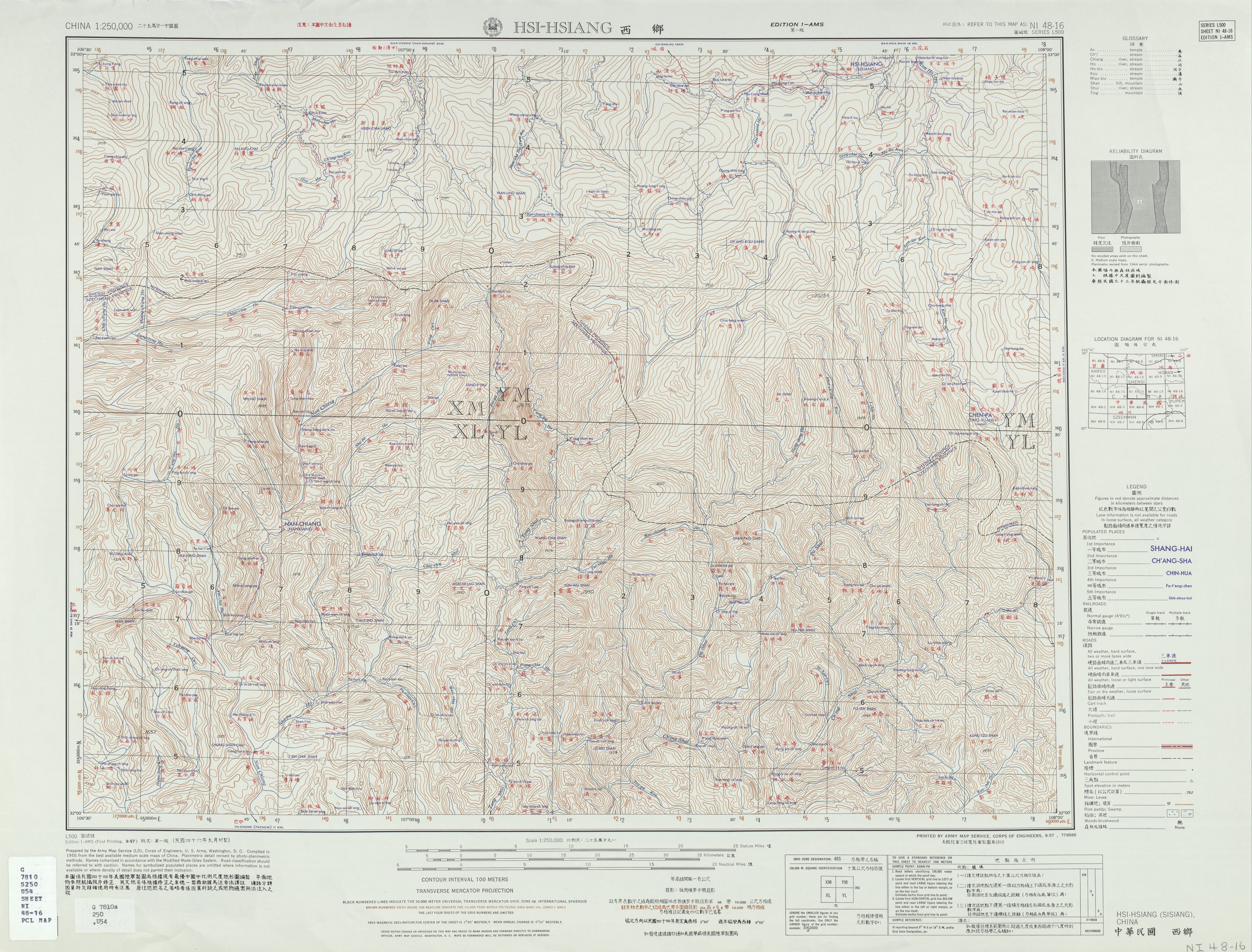
Map including Xixiang (labeled as HSI-HSIANG (SISIANG) 西鄉) (AMS, 1955)

Xixiang is served by the Yangpingguan–Ankang Railway. The Muma River supports small boat traffic.
