= Shiquan County =

Coordinates: 33°02′51″N 108°13′48″E

Shiquan County 石泉县 Shihchuan; Shihchüan
- County
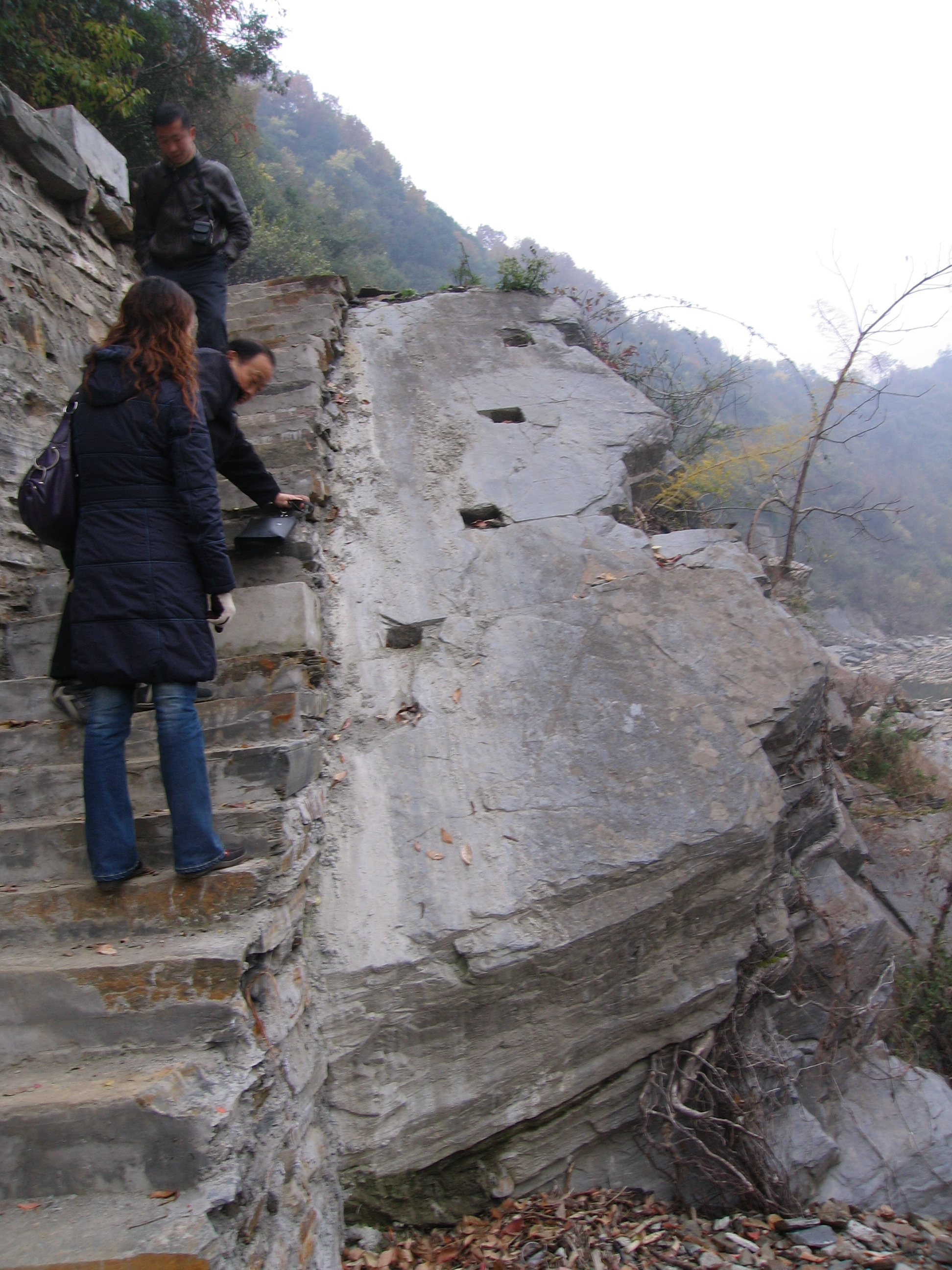

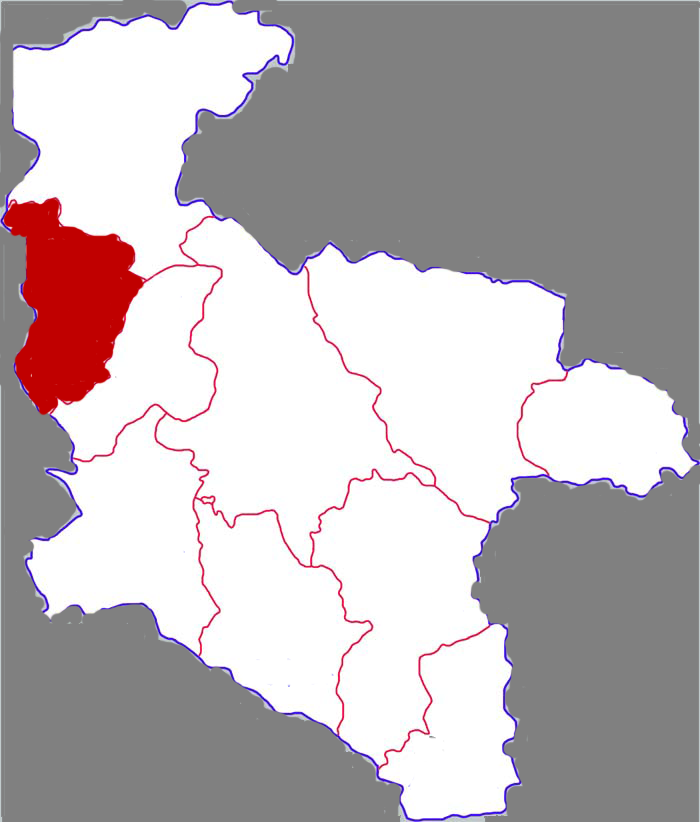
- Shiquan in Ankang

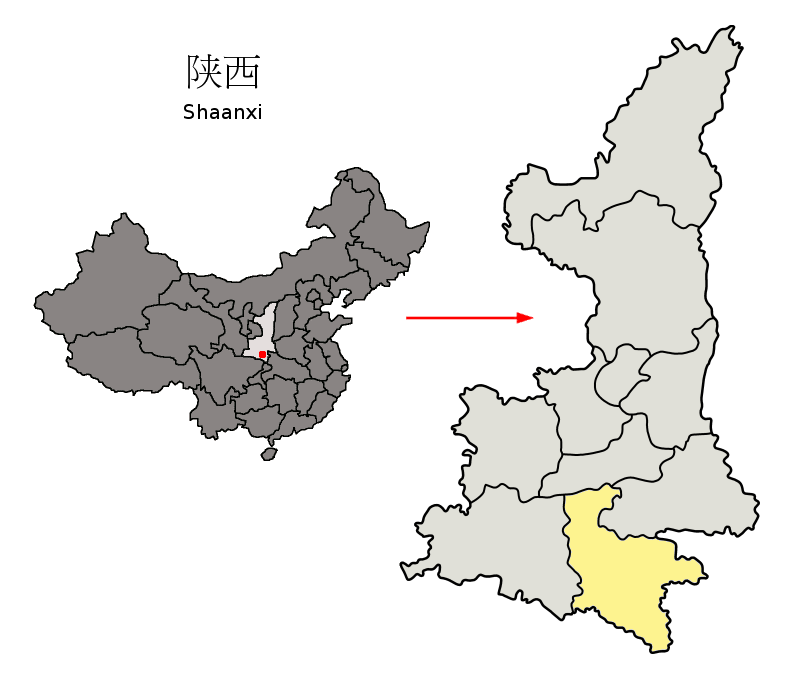
- Ankang in Shaanxi
- Country: People's Republic of China
- Province: Shaanxi
- Prefecture-level city: Ankang

Area
  - Total: 1,525 km^{2} (589 sq mi)

Population (2017)
  - Total: 183,300
  - Density: 120.2/km^{2} (311.3/sq mi)
- Time zone: UTC+8 (China standard time)
- Postal code: 725200
- Licence plates: 陕G
- Website: www.shiquan.gov.cn

Shiquan County (Chinese: 石泉县; pinyin: Shíquán Xiàn) is a county in the south Shaanxi province, China. It is under the administration of the prefecture-level city of Ankang. On 14 July 2022, a maximum temperature of 41.9 °C (107.4 °F) was registered.

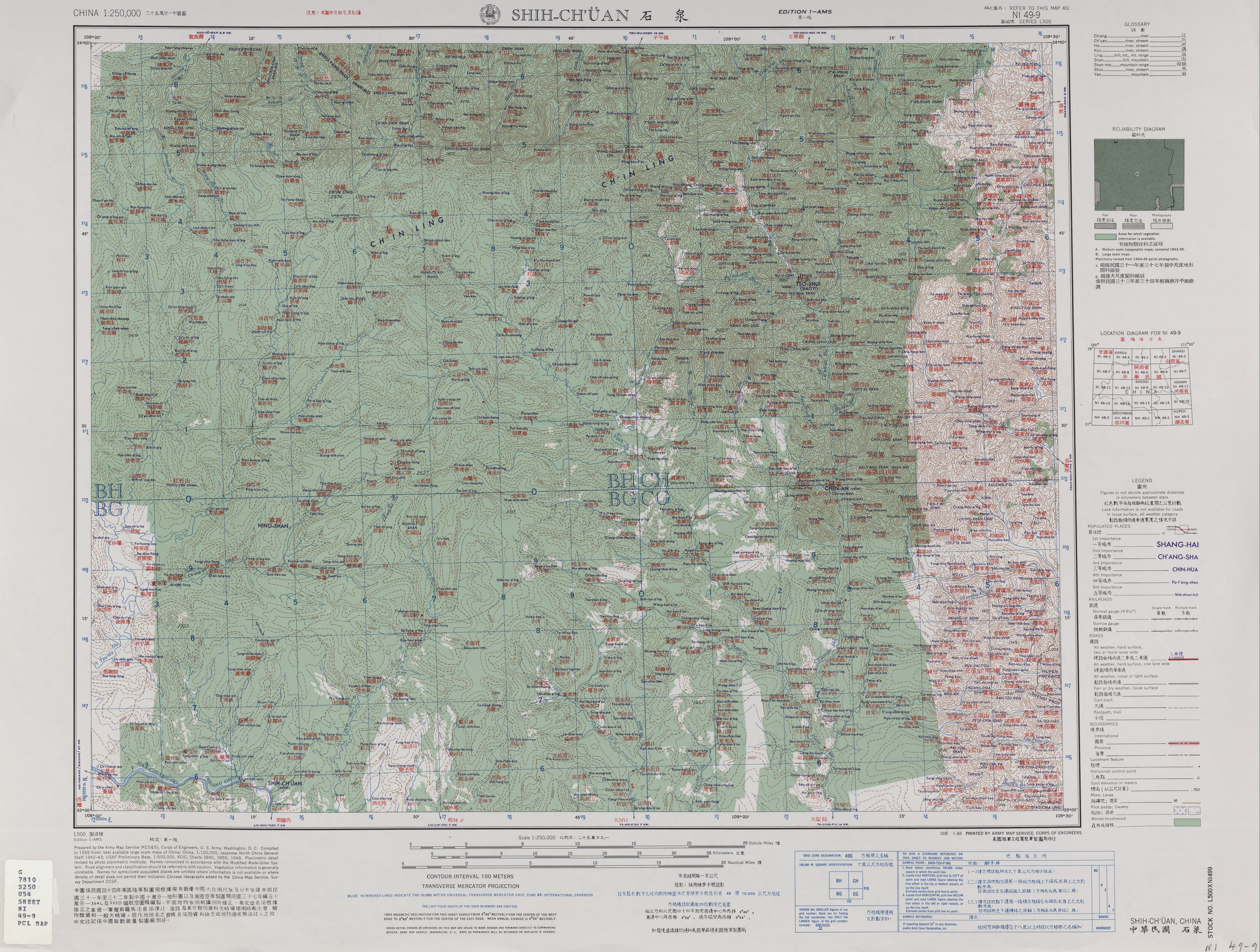
Map including Shiquan (labeled as 石泉 SHIH-CH'ÜAN (walled)) (AMS, 1955)

== Administrative divisions ==
As of 2019, Shiquan County is divided to 11 towns.

Towns

- Chengguan (城关镇)
- Raofeng (饶峰镇)
- Lianghe (两河镇)
- Yingfeng (迎丰镇)
- Chihe (池河镇)
- Houliu (后柳镇)
- Xihe (喜河镇)
- Yundou (熨斗镇)
- Yunwushan (云雾山镇)
- Zhongchi (中池镇)
- Zengxi (曾溪镇)

== Climate ==
Climate data for Shiquan, elevation 485 m (1,591 ft), (1991–2020 normals, extremes 1981–present)
Month	Jan	Feb	Mar	Apr	May	Jun	Jul	Aug	Sep	Oct	Nov	Dec	Year
Record high °C (°F)	18.7 (65.7)	22.9 (73.2)	35.0 (95.0)	34.7 (94.5)	36.9 (98.4)	39.2 (102.6)	41.0 (105.8)	42.2 (108.0)	39.8 (103.6)	30.2 (86.4)	24.1 (75.4)	19.2 (66.6)	42.2 (108.0)
Mean daily maximum °C (°F)	8.5 (47.3)	11.7 (53.1)	17.2 (63.0)	23.1 (73.6)	26.3 (79.3)	29.6 (85.3)	31.6 (88.9)	31.2 (88.2)	25.7 (78.3)	20.2 (68.4)	14.6 (58.3)	9.7 (49.5)	20.8 (69.4)
Daily mean °C (°F)	3.0 (37.4)	5.8 (42.4)	10.5 (50.9)	15.8 (60.4)	19.6 (67.3)	23.3 (73.9)	25.8 (78.4)	25.1 (77.2)	20.3 (68.5)	15.0 (59.0)	9.3 (48.7)	4.4 (39.9)	14.8 (58.7)
Mean daily minimum °C (°F)	−0.8 (30.6)	1.6 (34.9)	5.6 (42.1)	10.6 (51.1)	14.7 (58.5)	18.8 (65.8)	21.7 (71.1)	21.2 (70.2)	17.1 (62.8)	12.0 (53.6)	6.0 (42.8)	0.9 (33.6)	10.8 (51.4)
Record low °C (°F)	−8.5 (16.7)	−5.6 (21.9)	−4.2 (24.4)	0.7 (33.3)	5.7 (42.3)	11.9 (53.4)	15.0 (59.0)	13.4 (56.1)	7.9 (46.2)	−0.3 (31.5)	−3.8 (25.2)	−10.8 (12.6)	−10.8 (12.6)
Average precipitation mm (inches)	6.3 (0.25)	11.5 (0.45)	26.2 (1.03)	49.4 (1.94)	97.5 (3.84)	121.9 (4.80)	165.0 (6.50)	141.6 (5.57)	136.0 (5.35)	83.8 (3.30)	31.7 (1.25)	8.0 (0.31)	878.9 (34.59)
Average precipitation days (≥ 0.1 mm)	4.7	5.4	7.5	9.9	12.1	11.4	12.8	11.4	12.4	13.0	8.6	5.2	114.4
Average snowy days	3.8	2.4	0.8	0	0	0	0	0	0	0	0.5	1.4	8.9
Average relative humidity (%)	72	68	67	72	76	78	81	81	84	86	83	75	77
Mean monthly sunshine hours	106.0	102.4	140.5	170.3	169.7	176.4	196.1	194.5	119.8	106.0	97.4	107.4	1,686.5
Percentage possible sunshine	33	33	38	43	40	41	45	48	33	30	31	35	38
Source: China Meteorological Administration all-time extreme temperature

== Transportation ==
- China National Highway 210
- China National Highway 316
- Yangpingguan–Ankang Railway
