= Yangpingguan railway station =

Railway station in Hanzhong, Shaanxi

Yangpingguan 阳平关
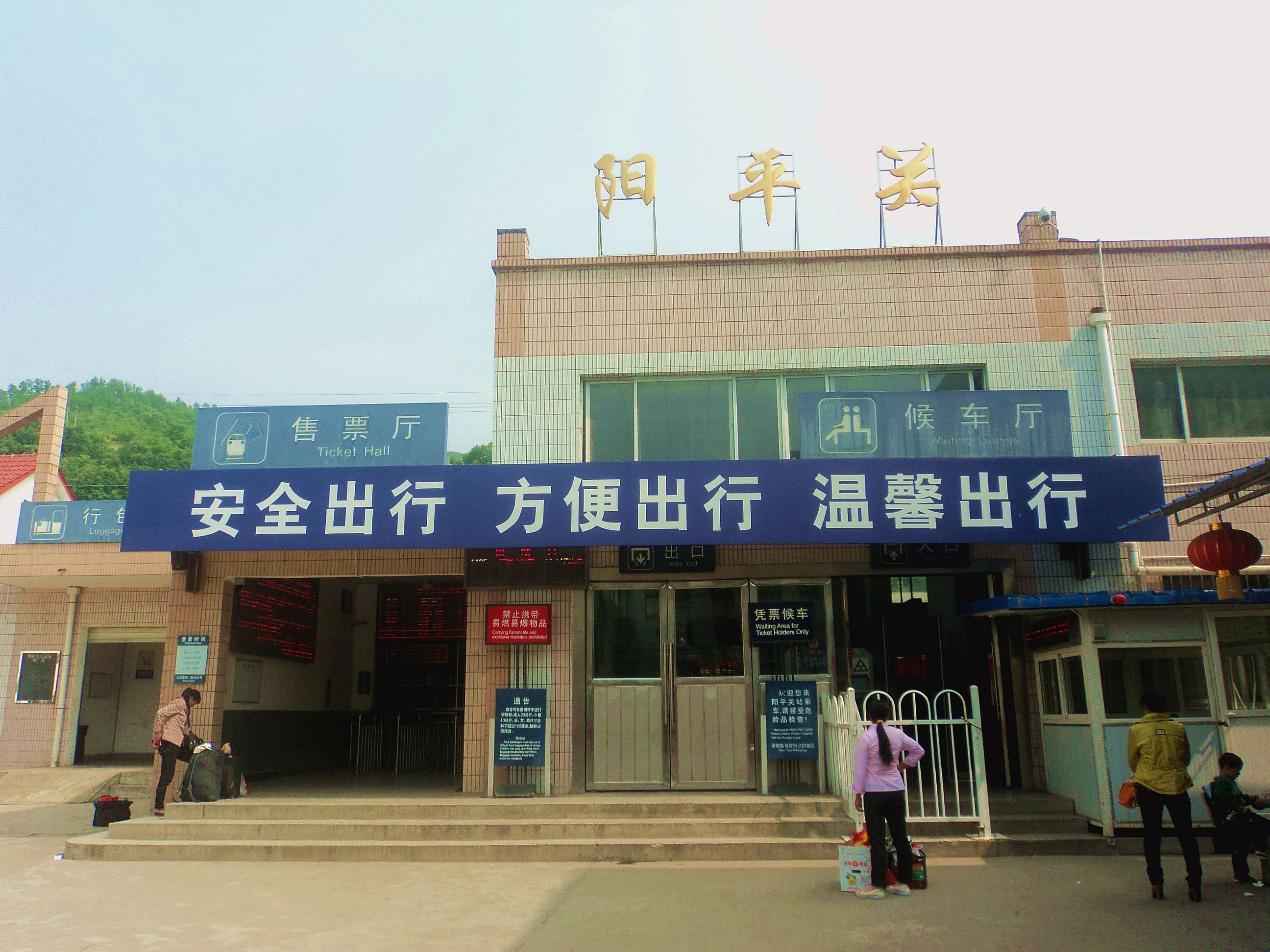

General information
- Location: Yangpingguan, Ningqiang County, Hanzhong, Shaanxi; China
- Coordinates: 32°58′07″N 106°02′00″E
- Lines: Baoji–Chengdu railway; Yangpingguan–Ankang railway

History
- Opened: 1956
Location

Yangpingguan railway station (Chinese: 阳平关站) is a railway station in Yangpingguan, Ningqiang County, Hanzhong, Shaanxi, China. It opened in 1956. It is an intermediate stop on the Baoji–Chengdu railway and the western terminus of the Yangpingguan–Ankang railway.

Preceding station	China Railway	Following station
Yanzibian towards Baoji	Baoji–Chengdu railway	Lueyang towards Chengdu
Terminus	Yangpingguan–Ankang railway	Mianxian towards Ankang
