= Ankang =

Ankang 安康市 An-k'ang
- Prefecture-level city
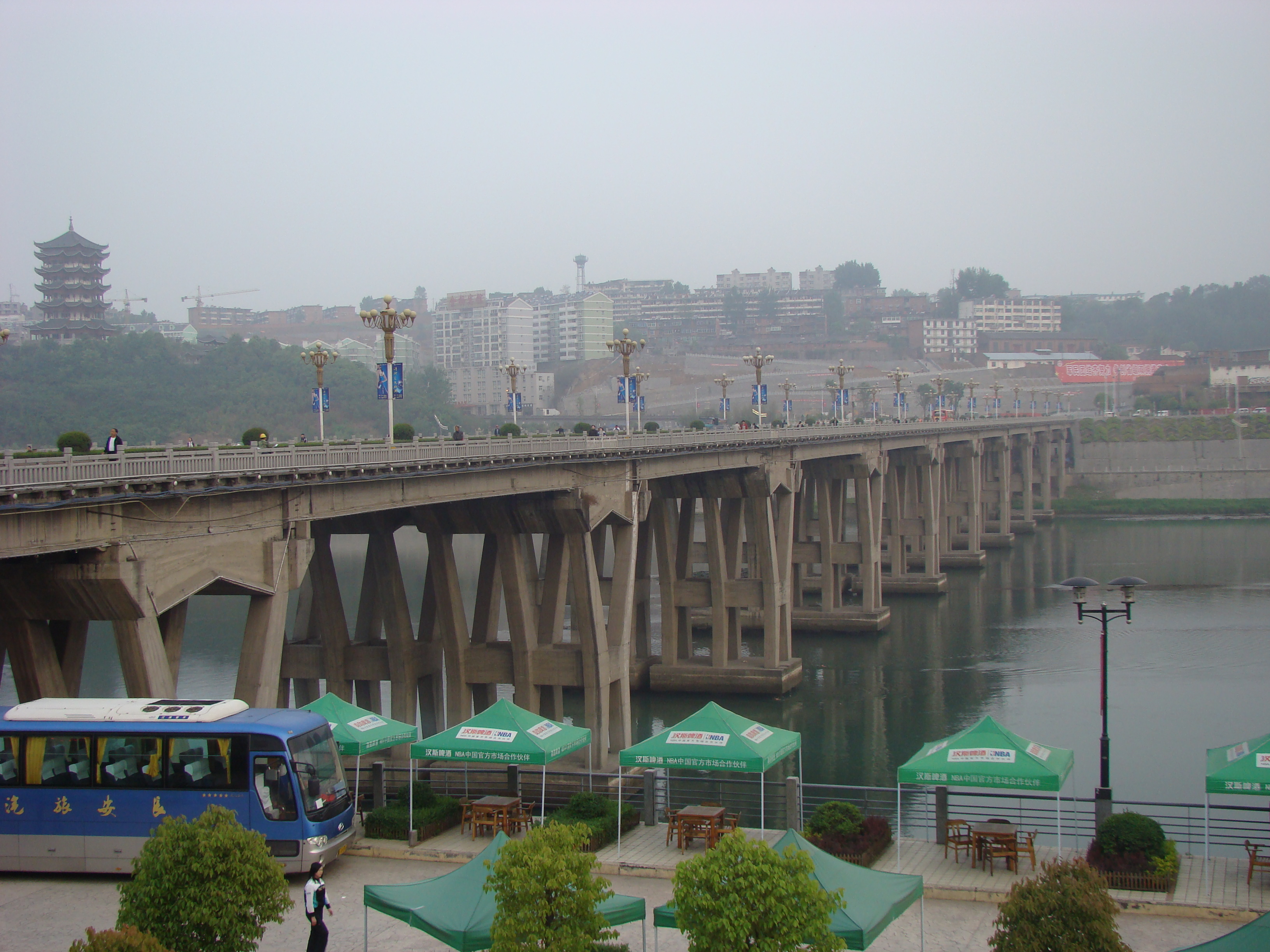

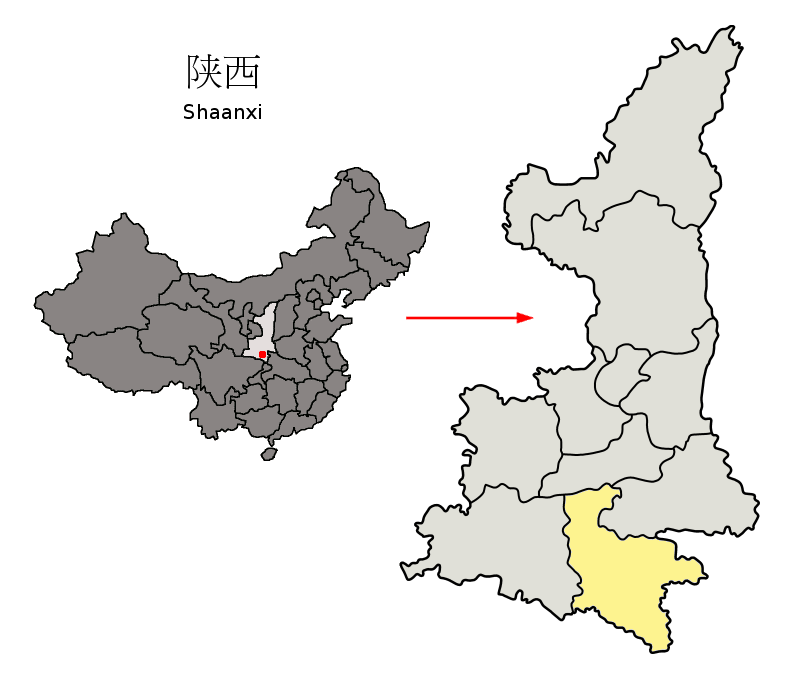
- Location of Ankang City jurisdiction in Shaanxi
- Coordinates (Ankang municipal government): 32°41′07″N 109°01′44″E
- Country: People's Republic of China
- Province: Shaanxi
- Municipal seat: Hanbin District

Area
  - Prefecture-level city: 23,391 km^{2} (9,031 sq mi)

Population (2020)
  - Prefecture-level city: 2,493,436
  - Density: 106.60/km^{2} (276.09/sq mi)
  - Urban: 1,244,784

GDP
  - Prefecture-level city: CN¥ 75.5 billion US$ 12.1 billion
  - Per capita: CN¥ 28,536; US$ 4,582
- Time zone: UTC+8 (China Standard)
- Postal code: 725000
- ISO 3166 code: CN-SN-09

Ankang
- Chinese: 安康
- Literal meaning: Peaceful & Healthy
Transcriptions
Standard Mandarin
- Hanyu Pinyin: Ānkāng
- Wade–Giles: An-k'ang

Xicheng
- Chinese: 西城
- Literal meaning: West City
Transcriptions
Standard Mandarin
- Hanyu Pinyin: Xīchéng
- Wade–Giles: Hsi-ch'eng

Jinzhou
- Chinese: 金州
- Literal meaning: Golden Prefecture
Transcriptions
Standard Mandarin
- Hanyu Pinyin: Jīnzhōu
- Wade–Giles: Chin-chou

Ankang (Chinese: 安康; pinyin: Ānkāng) is a prefecture-level city in the south of Shaanxi Province in the People's Republic of China, bordering Hubei province to the east, Chongqing municipality to the south, and Sichuan province to the southwest. It covers an area of 23,391 square kilometres (9,031 sq mi) and consists of Xunyang, a county-level city, one urban district, and eight counties. Its total population was 2,493,436 people according to the 2020 Chinese census, with 1,244,784 living in urban areas.

== History ==
The settlement of Ankang dates to the Stone Age, and its recorded history dates back more than 3000 years. The settlement was originally known as Xicheng. Ankang County was established in 1st Taikang year of the Western Jin Dynasty (AD 280). It later formed part of the Eastern Liang Prefecture, which was reorganized into the Jin Prefecture in the 3rd Feidi year of the Western Wei (AD 554). Under the Sui, this was renamed Xicheng Commandery (西城郡; Xīchéngjùn) and, under the Tang, Ankang Commandery (安康郡; Ānkāngjùn).

== Climate ==
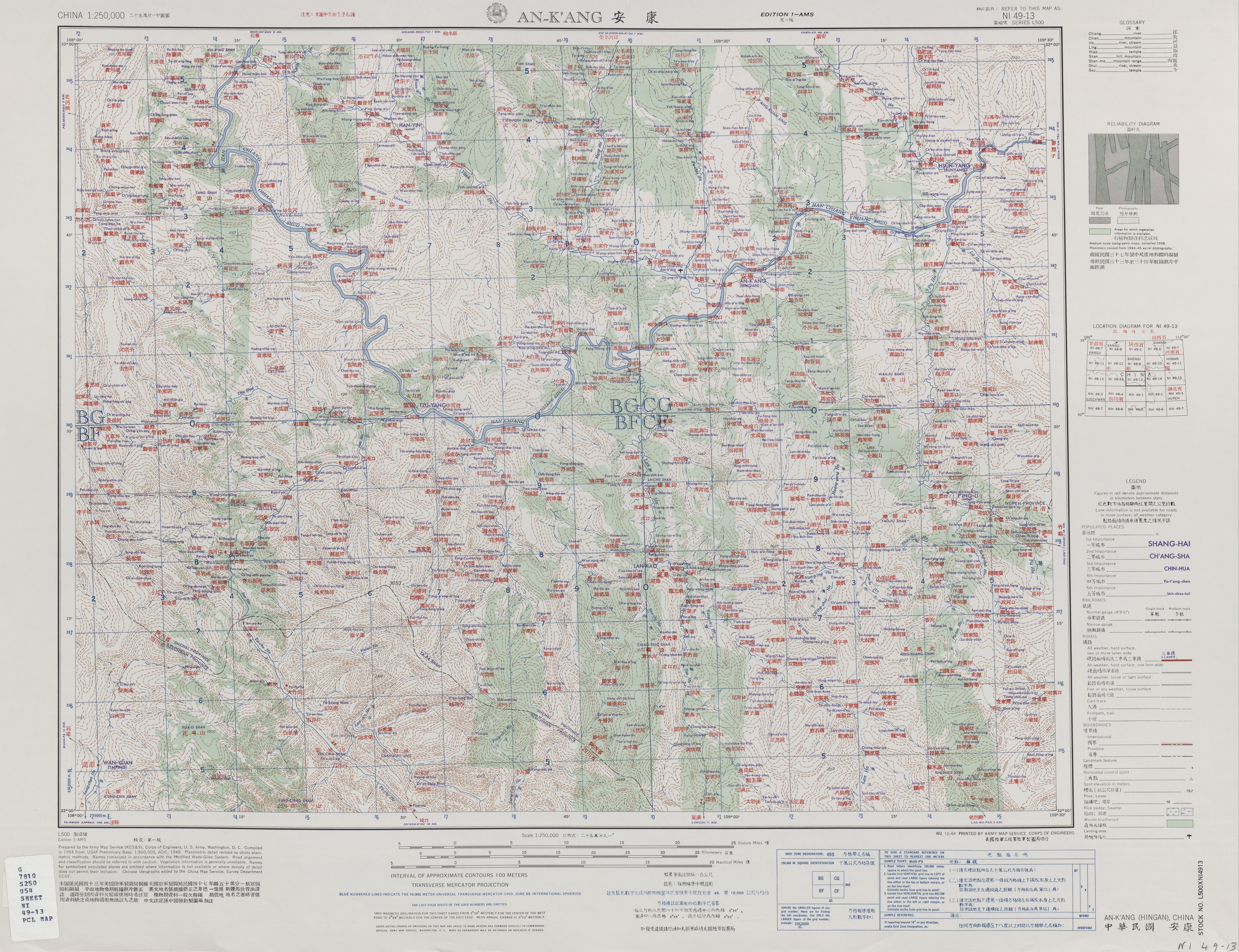
Map including Ankang (labeled as 安康 AN-K'ANG (HINGAN)) (AMS, 1954)

Ankang has a monsoon-influenced humid subtropical climate (Köppen Cwa), with cool, dry winters, and hot, humid summers. The monthly 24-hour average temperature ranges from 3.7 °C (38.3 °F) in January to 27.0 °C (80.4 °F) in July, while the annual mean is 15.7 °C (60.1 °F). Most of annual precipitation occurs from June to September.

Climate data for Ankang, elevation 291 m (955 ft), (1991–2020 normals, extremes 1971–present)
Month	Jan	Feb	Mar	Apr	May	Jun	Jul	Aug	Sep	Oct	Nov	Dec	Year
Record high °C (°F)	18.3 (64.9)	23.8 (74.8)	31.7 (89.1)	37.4 (99.3)	37.6 (99.7)	40.3 (104.5)	42.5 (108.5)	41.3 (106.3)	40.7 (105.3)	33.7 (92.7)	25.9 (78.6)	19.0 (66.2)	42.5 (108.5)
Mean daily maximum °C (°F)	8.6 (47.5)	12.1 (53.8)	17.5 (63.5)	23.5 (74.3)	27.1 (80.8)	30.7 (87.3)	33.0 (91.4)	32.3 (90.1)	26.9 (80.4)	20.8 (69.4)	14.7 (58.5)	9.6 (49.3)	21.4 (70.5)
Daily mean °C (°F)	3.9 (39.0)	6.8 (44.2)	11.4 (52.5)	16.9 (62.4)	20.9 (69.6)	24.9 (76.8)	27.4 (81.3)	26.7 (80.1)	21.9 (71.4)	16.3 (61.3)	10.3 (50.5)	5.1 (41.2)	16.0 (60.9)
Mean daily minimum °C (°F)	0.5 (32.9)	3.0 (37.4)	6.9 (44.4)	11.9 (53.4)	16.4 (61.5)	20.6 (69.1)	23.4 (74.1)	22.8 (73.0)	18.7 (65.7)	13.5 (56.3)	7.4 (45.3)	2.1 (35.8)	12.3 (54.1)
Record low °C (°F)	−8.8 (16.2)	−5.9 (21.4)	−2.6 (27.3)	0.1 (32.2)	7.8 (46.0)	11.9 (53.4)	16.7 (62.1)	13.7 (56.7)	10.6 (51.1)	1.0 (33.8)	−3.1 (26.4)	−9.7 (14.5)	−9.7 (14.5)
Average precipitation mm (inches)	5.7 (0.22)	10.5 (0.41)	29.2 (1.15)	51.9 (2.04)	94.9 (3.74)	126.6 (4.98)	138.4 (5.45)	126.4 (4.98)	121.9 (4.80)	79.5 (3.13)	26.7 (1.05)	6.4 (0.25)	818.1 (32.2)
Average precipitation days (≥ 0.1 mm)	4.1	4.9	7.7	9.8	12.1	11.1	11.5	11.0	12.2	11.6	8.5	4.8	109.3
Average snowy days	2.5	1.7	0.8	0.1	0	0	0	0	0	0	0.4	1.0	6.5
Average relative humidity (%)	70	65	66	70	72	73	75	75	79	82	81	75	74
Mean monthly sunshine hours	97.3	101.1	141.8	167.3	175.3	183.4	213.9	203.3	127.9	97.7	84.1	89.1	1,682.2
Percentage possible sunshine	31	32	38	43	41	43	49	50	35	28	27	29	37
Source 1: China Meteorological Administration all-time extreme temperatureNOAA
Source 2: Weather China

== Administrative divisions ==
Ankang includes one district, one county-level city and eight counties, totaling 109 towns, 88 townships and 3 sub-district offices.

Map
Name	Hanzi	Hanyu Pinyin	Resident Population (2018) (Note: The resident population includes: anyone who lives in a township and has a household registration in the township or their registration is to be determined; anyone who lives in a township and has been away from the township where their household is registered for more than six months; anyone who has an account in a township and has been away for less than six months or who is working and studying outside Shannxi province.)	Area (km^{2})	Density (/km^{2})
Hanbin District	汉滨区	Hànbīn Qū	883,800	3,645.91	
Xunyang City	旬阳市	Xúnyáng Shì	434,700	3,540.66	
Hanyin County	汉阴县	Hànyīn Xiàn	249,700	1,365.16	
Shiquan County	石泉县	Shíquán Xiàn	173,800	1,516.40	
Ningshan County	宁陕县	Níngshǎn Xiàn	70,300	3,666.89	
Ziyang County	紫阳县	Zǐyáng Xiàn	286,700	2,240.34	
Langao County	岚皋县	Lángāo Xiàn	156,500	1,957.26	
Pingli County	平利县	Pínglì Xiàn	195,900	2,647.80	
Zhenping County	镇坪县	Zhènpíng Xiàn	51,800	1,502.45	
Baihe County	白河县	Báihé Xiàn	165,800	1,453.44	
