= Hantai District =

Hantai 汉台区
- District
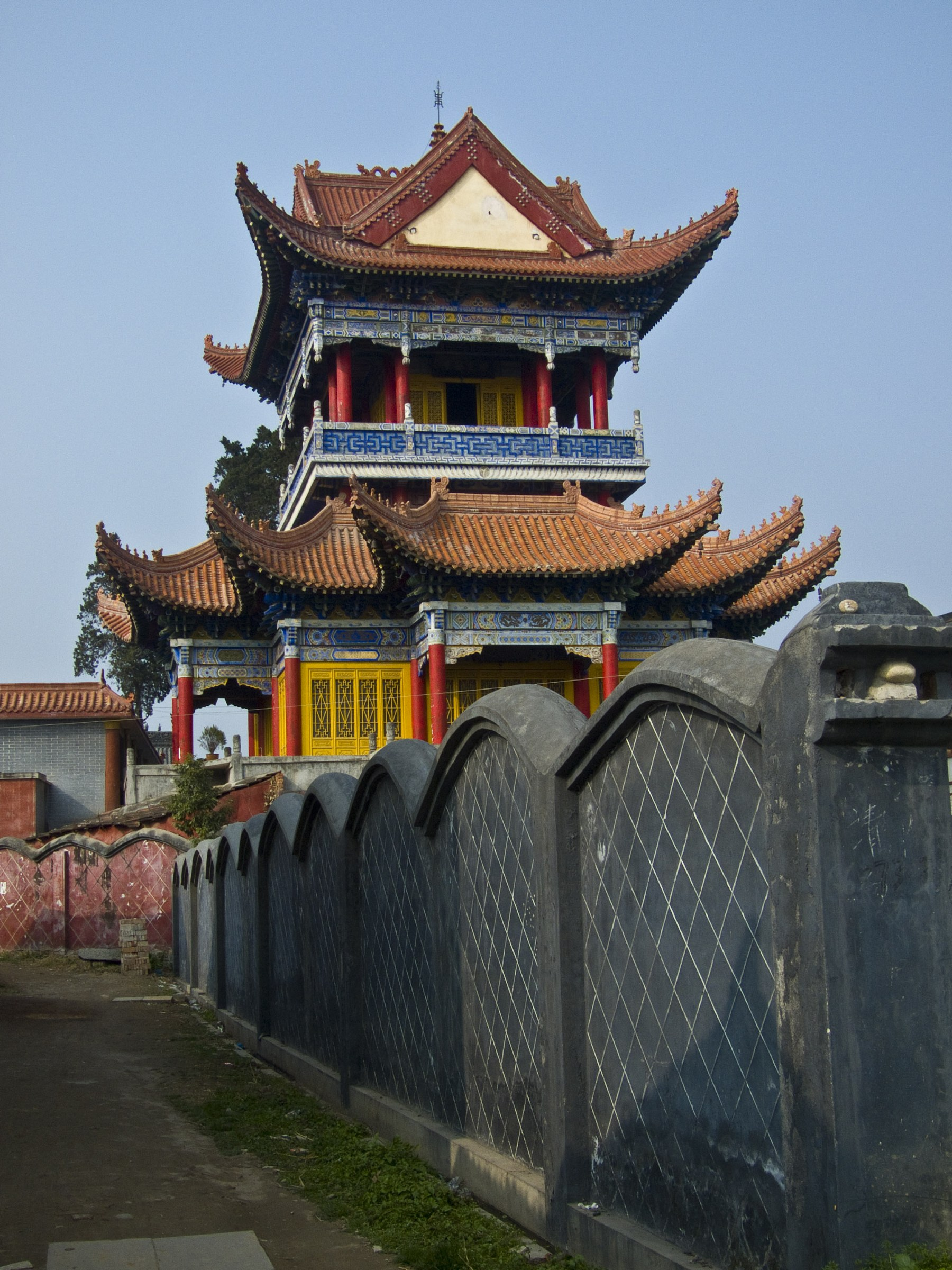
- Wengong Daoist Temple (文公祠道观)

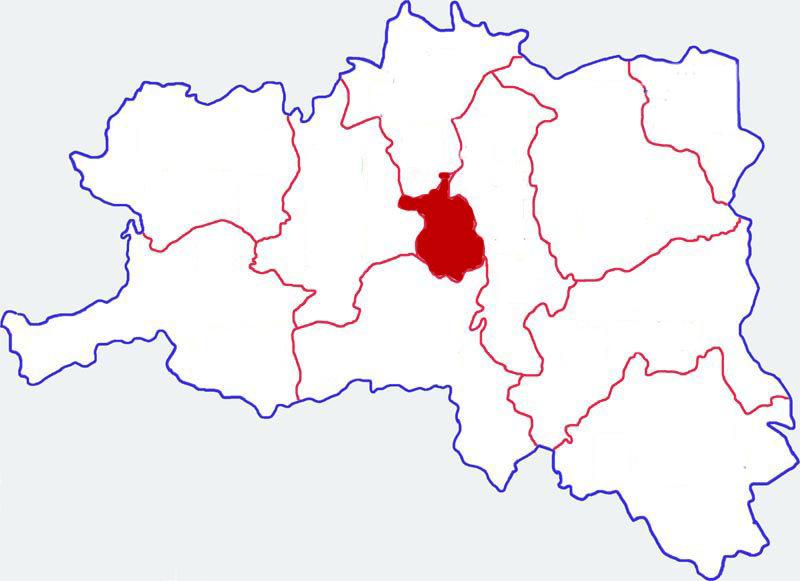
- Location in Hanzhong

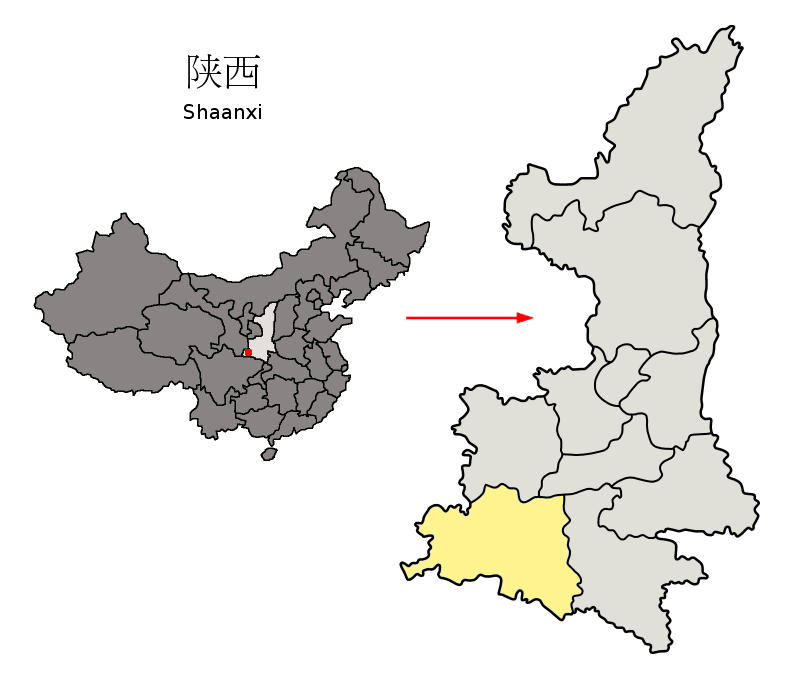
- Hanzhong in Shaanxi
- Coordinates: 33°04′04″N 107°01′55″E
- Country: People's Republic of China
- Province: Shaanxi
- Prefecture-level city: Hanzhong
- Established: February 21, 1996

Area
  - Total: 556 km^{2} (215 sq mi)

Population (2019)
  - Total: 570,900
  - Density: 1,030/km^{2} (2,660/sq mi)
- Time zone: UTC+8 (China standard time)
- Postal code: 723000
- Area code: (0)916
- Licence plates: 陕F
- Website: www.htq.gov.cn

Hantai District (simplified Chinese: 汉台区; traditional Chinese: 漢台區 / 漢臺區; pinyin: Hàntái Qū), is a district and the seat of the city of Hanzhong, Shaanxi province, China.

== Administrative divisions ==
As of 2019, Hantai District is divided to 8 subdistricts and 7 towns.

Subdistricts

- Beiguan Subdistrict (北关街道)
- Dongdajie Subdistrict (东大街街道)
- Hanzhonglu Subdistrict (汉中路街道)
- Zhongshanjie Subdistrict (中山街街道)
- Dongguan Subdistrict (东关街道)
- Xinyuan Subdistrict (鑫源街道)
- Qili Subdistrict (七里街道)
- Longjiang Subdistrict (龙江街道)

Towns

- Pu (铺镇)
- Wuxiang (武乡镇)
- Hedongdian (河东店镇)
- Zongying (宗营镇)
- Laojun (老君镇)
- Hanwang (汉王镇)
- Xuwang (徐望镇)
