= Hanyin County =

Hanyin County 汉阴县
- County
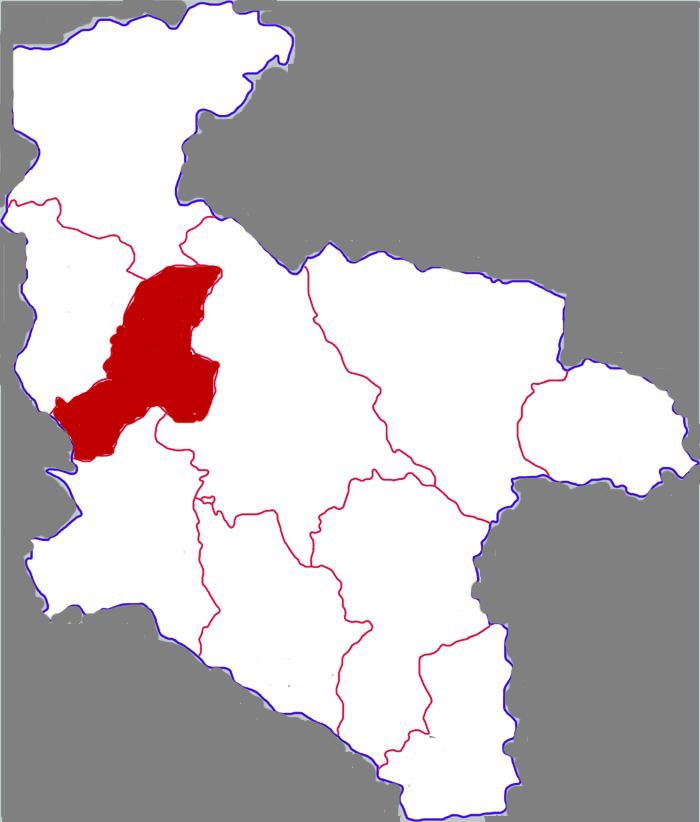
- Hanyin in Ankang

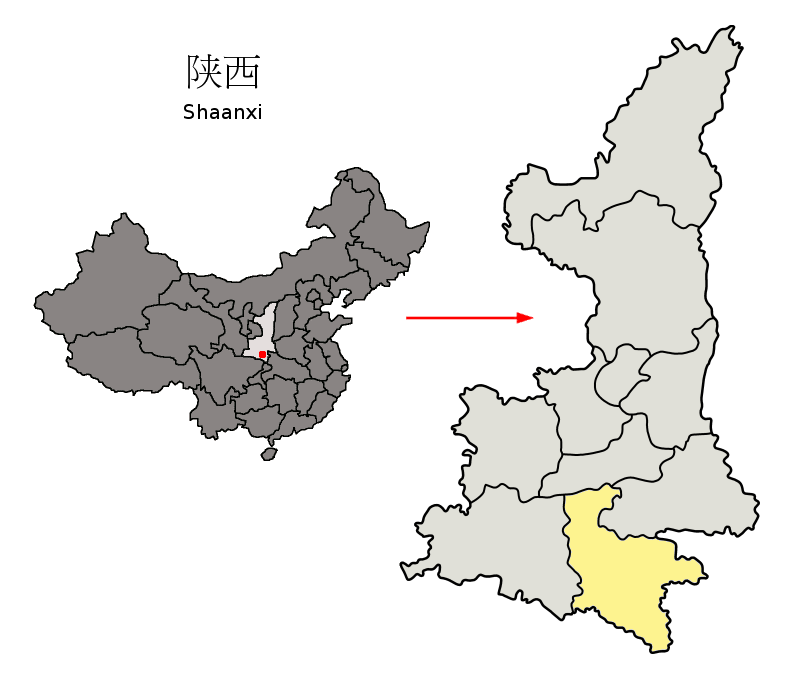
- Ankang in Shaanxi
- Coordinates: 32°53′35″N 108°30′32″E
- Country: People's Republic of China
- Province: Shaanxi
- Prefecture-level city: Ankang

Area
  - Total: 1,365 km^{2} (527 sq mi)
- Highest elevation (Fenghuangshan): 2,128 m (6,982 ft)
- Lowest elevation (Xuanwo town): 290 m (950 ft)

Population (2019)
  - Total: 311,500
  - Density: 228.2/km^{2} (591.0/sq mi)
- Time zone: UTC+8 (China standard time)
- Postal code: 725100
- Licence plates: 陕G
- Website: www.hanyin.gov.cn

Hanyin County (simplified Chinese: 汉阴县; traditional Chinese: 漢陰縣; pinyin: Hànyīn Xiàn) is a county in the south of Shaanxi province, China. It is under the administration of the prefecture-level city of Ankang.

Hanyin was established as early as the Qin dynasty and then known as Xicheng County. In 757 AD it became Hanyin.

== Administrative divisions ==
As of 2019, Hanyin County is divided to 10 towns.

Towns

- Chengguan (城关镇)
- Jianchi (涧池镇)
- Puxi (蒲溪镇)
- Pingliang (平梁镇)
- Shuangru (双乳镇)
- Tiefosi (铁佛寺镇)
- Xuanwo (漩涡镇)
- Hanyang (汉阳镇)
- Shuanghekou (双河口镇)
- Guanyinhe (观音河镇)

== Climate ==
Climate data for Hanyin, elevation 413 m (1,355 ft), (1991–2020 normals, extremes 1981–present)
Month	Jan	Feb	Mar	Apr	May	Jun	Jul	Aug	Sep	Oct	Nov	Dec	Year
Record high °C (°F)	19.0 (66.2)	22.7 (72.9)	33.8 (92.8)	34.7 (94.5)	36.9 (98.4)	38.4 (101.1)	40.1 (104.2)	39.6 (103.3)	38.8 (101.8)	30.6 (87.1)	23.7 (74.7)	19.1 (66.4)	40.1 (104.2)
Mean daily maximum °C (°F)	8.1 (46.6)	11.2 (52.2)	16.7 (62.1)	22.8 (73.0)	26.2 (79.2)	29.6 (85.3)	31.6 (88.9)	30.9 (87.6)	25.6 (78.1)	20.1 (68.2)	14.2 (57.6)	9.3 (48.7)	20.5 (69.0)
Daily mean °C (°F)	3.3 (37.9)	6.1 (43.0)	10.8 (51.4)	16.3 (61.3)	20.2 (68.4)	24.1 (75.4)	26.4 (79.5)	25.6 (78.1)	20.8 (69.4)	15.4 (59.7)	9.5 (49.1)	4.6 (40.3)	15.3 (59.5)
Mean daily minimum °C (°F)	−0.4 (31.3)	2.2 (36.0)	6.2 (43.2)	11.4 (52.5)	15.5 (59.9)	19.7 (67.5)	22.4 (72.3)	21.7 (71.1)	17.6 (63.7)	12.4 (54.3)	6.3 (43.3)	1.3 (34.3)	11.4 (52.4)
Record low °C (°F)	−6.9 (19.6)	−5.2 (22.6)	−3.4 (25.9)	−0.1 (31.8)	7.4 (45.3)	13.5 (56.3)	15.2 (59.4)	14.1 (57.4)	9.4 (48.9)	0.7 (33.3)	−2.8 (27.0)	−10.1 (13.8)	−10.1 (13.8)
Average precipitation mm (inches)	5.7 (0.22)	11.2 (0.44)	29.4 (1.16)	52.8 (2.08)	106.2 (4.18)	123.5 (4.86)	157.6 (6.20)	136.3 (5.37)	136.1 (5.36)	82.8 (3.26)	31.6 (1.24)	6.8 (0.27)	880 (34.64)
Average precipitation days (≥ 0.1 mm)	4.4	5.1	8.3	9.6	12.7	11.2	12.3	10.7	12.9	11.9	8.4	4.9	112.4
Average snowy days	3.5	2.2	0.8	0.1	0	0	0	0	0	0	0.6	1.1	8.3
Average relative humidity (%)	71	68	67	71	74	76	79	79	82	84	83	76	76
Mean monthly sunshine hours	93.0	87.0	126.8	155.2	159.3	167.1	195.4	191.6	117.7	99.0	91.0	92.4	1,575.5
Percentage possible sunshine	29	28	34	40	37	39	45	47	32	29	29	30	35
Source: China Meteorological Administration

== Transportation ==
Hanying is served by the Yangpingguan–Ankang Railway. Major highways include China National Highway 316 as well as the G7011 Shiyan–Tianshui Expressway.
