= Hanzhong =

Hanzhong 汉中市 Hanchung
- Prefecture-level city
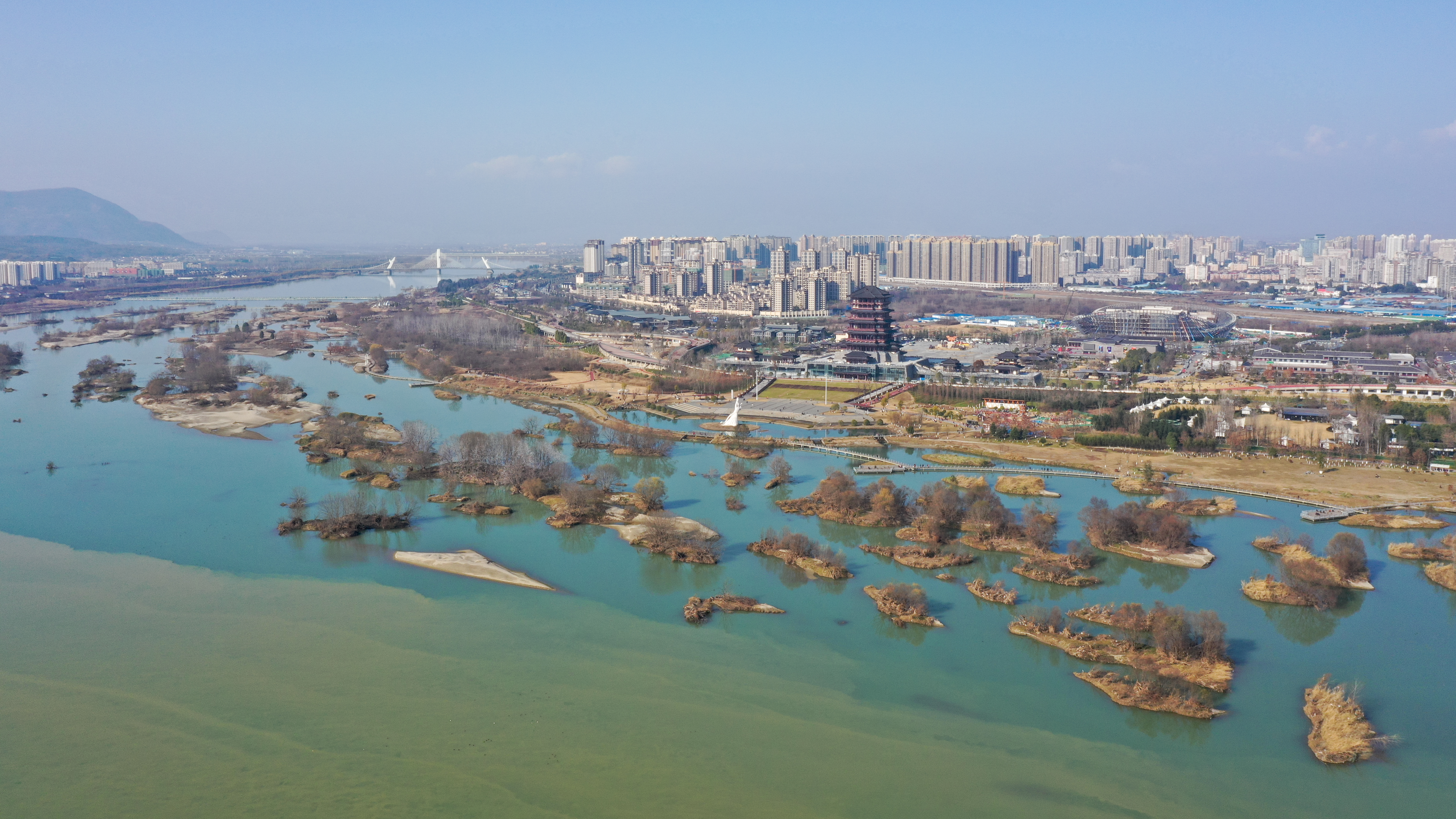
- Hanzhong City with Han River flowing through

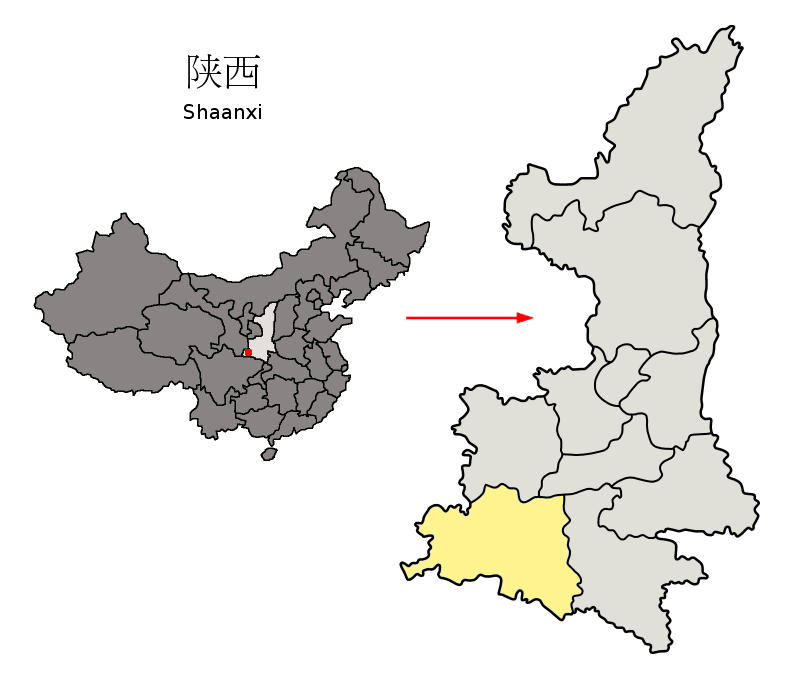
- Location of Hanzhong City jurisdiction in Shaanxi
- Coordinates (Hanzhong municipal government): 33°03′59″N 107°01′24″E
- Country: People's Republic of China
- Province: Shaanxi
- Established: c. 800 BC
- Municipal seat: Hantai District

Government
  - Mayor: Zhong Hongjiang (钟洪江)
  - Party Secretary: Vacant

Area
  - Prefecture-level city: 27,246 km^{2} (10,520 sq mi)
  - Urban: 3,359 km^{2} (1,297 sq mi)
  - Metro: 3,359 km^{2} (1,297 sq mi)
- Elevation: 511 m (1,677 ft)
- Highest elevation: 2,038 m (6,686 ft)

Population (2020 census)
  - Prefecture-level city: 3,211,462
  - Density: 117.87/km^{2} (305.28/sq mi)
  - Urban: 1,084,448
  - Urban density: 322.8/km^{2} (836.2/sq mi)
  - Metro: 1,084,448
  - Metro density: 322.8/km^{2} (836.2/sq mi)

GDP
  - Prefecture-level city: CN¥ 106 billion US$ 17 billion
  - Per capita: CN¥ 30,849; US$ 4,953
- Time zone: UTC+8 (China Standard)
- Postal code: 723000
- Area code: 0916
- ISO 3166 code: CN-SN-07
- Licence plates: 陕F
- Website: www.hanzhong.gov.cn

Hanzhong
- Traditional Chinese: 漢中
- Simplified Chinese: 汉中
- Literal meaning: middle of the Han (River)
Transcriptions
Standard Mandarin
- Hanyu Pinyin: Hànzhōng
- IPA: [xân.ʈʂʊ́ŋ]

Hanzhong (simplified Chinese: 汉中; traditional Chinese: 漢中; lit. 'middle of the Han River'; abbreviation: Han) is a prefecture-level city in the southwest of Shaanxi province, China, bordering the provinces of Sichuan to the south and Gansu to the west.

The founder of the Han dynasty, Liu Bang, was once enfeoffed as the king of the Hanzhong region after overthrowing the Qin dynasty. During the Chu-Han contention, Liu Bang shortened his title to the King of Han (漢王), and later used it as the name of his imperial dynasty. In this way, Hanzhong was responsible for the naming of the Han dynasty, which was later hailed as the first golden age in imperial Chinese history and lends its name to the principal ethnic group in China.

Hanzhong is located at the modern headwater of the Han River, the largest tributary of the Yangtze River. Hanzhong city covers 27,246 square kilometres (10,520 sq mi) and is centered around the Hantai District. The prefecture-level city consists of two urban district and nine rural counties. As of the 2020 census, its population was 3,211,462, of whom 1,084,448 lived in the built-up (or metro) area made of Hantai and Nanzheng districts.

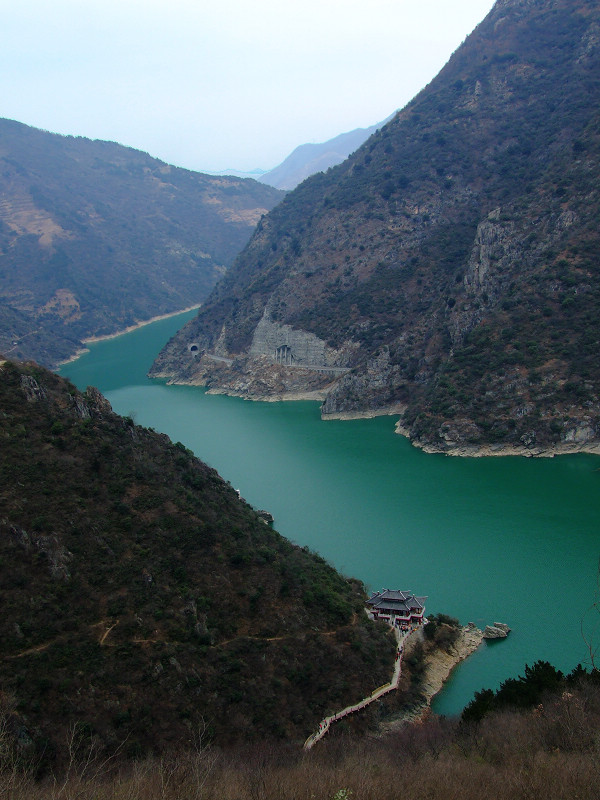
Bao River (褒河)

== History ==
=== Pre-Qin dynasty (before 220 BC) ===
There are few references to Hanzhong before the Qin dynasty's unification of China in 221 BC. The Book of Documents refers to an area called Liangzhou (梁州), while Sima Qian's book Records of the Grand Historian speaks of a "Bao state" (褒國; where the ancient beauty Bao Si came from), both of which are believed to refer to the area now called Hanzhong.

From 900 BC, the area has been called Nanzheng (Chinese: 南鄭; lit. 'southern Zheng'). The ancient geographical treatise entitled Shui Jing Zhu records that Duke Huan of Zheng, a vassal lord from the Western Zhou dynasty, was slain in a battle with the nomadic Quanrong people, and some of the Zheng citizens fled the capital to establish a new settlement to the south, giving rise to the area's name. However, the veracity of this story is controversial.

=== Qin and Han dynasties (220 BC – 200 AD) ===
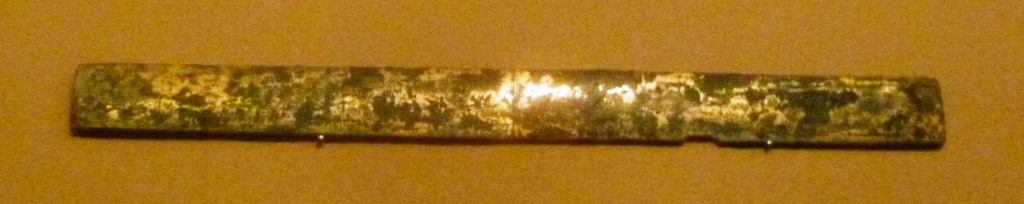
Gilded Bronze Ruler - 1 chi = 231 cm. Western Han (206 BCE – CE 8), Hanzhong

In the Qin dynasty the area was governed as the Hanzhong Commandery, whose seat was in current day Nanzheng County, south of the Hanzhong urban area. In 207 BC, the Qin dynasty collapsed. Liu Bang, who would later become the founding emperor of the Han dynasty, was made lord of Hanzhong. He spent several years there before raising an army to challenge his arch-rival, Xiang Yu, during the Chu–Han Contention. In 206 BC, after the victory at Gaixia, Liu Bang named his imperial dynasty after his native district, as was customary. However, he chose Hanzhong rather than his birthplace Pei County (present-day Xuzhou, Jiangsu Province). Thus, Hanzhong gave its name to the Han dynasty.

In the second century AD, the Eastern Han dynasty gradually weakened. Outsiders from the Ba region attacked the Hanzhong area, as they had in the past. The Han dynasty lost power. Zhang Lu, supported by followers of a Taoist sect, Way of the Celestial Masters, led an independent theocratic government in Hanzhong. Thirty years later, after the Battle of Yangping, Zhang Lu surrendered Hanzhong to the warlord, Cao Cao.

Prior to and during the Three Kingdoms period, Hanzhong was a militarily strategically important site. It was located at a critical point along the route an army would take from the Central Plain to the Sichuan Basin. At this time, Cao Cao lost control of Hanzhong to Liu Bei, who assumed the title of King of Hanzhong. Ruins and landmarks of the Three Kingdoms era remaining in Hanzhong include the tomb of the Shu Han chancellor Zhuge Liang. Much of this period of Hanzhong's history is retold in the historical novel Romance of the Three Kingdoms.

=== Tang, Song, and Yuan dynasties (618–1368) ===
In Hanzhong, between the end of the Han dynasty and the beginning of the Tang dynasty there was political turmoil. In 784, when the capital, Chang'an (modern Xi'an) was captured, the Emperor Dezong of Tang fled to Hanzhong. During the Northern Song dynasty (960–1127), however, Hanzhong became economically wealthy with city tax revenue just behind that of regional capitals such as Kaifeng and Chengdu.

=== Ming and Qing dynasties, and post-imperial era (1368–present) ===
In 1331, during the Ming dynasty in the reign of the Hongwu Emperor, extensive renovations were made to Hanzhong's infrastructure. This work brought Hanzhong to its present layout and form.

The Wanli Emperor (r. 1572–1620) installed his fifth son, Zhu Changhao (Chinese: 朱常浩), as king of Hanzhong. Changhao built a large, luxurious palace in what is now the Children's Park. The palace's Radiant Glass Wall (Chinese: 玻璃照壁) was demolished during road construction in 1935. Since then, a 13.6 m section has been rebuilt on the eastern end of Sanpu Street (Chinese: 伞铺街; pinyin: Sǎnpù Jīe).

In 1643, Zhu Changhao fled south to Sichuan ahead of Li Zicheng's rebel army. As he departed, his Hanzhong palace was looted. Qing dynasty historians remembered the massive but empty palace.

In December 1949, in the Chinese Civil War, Hanzhong was captured by the People's Liberation Army as the Chinese Communist Party (CCP) expelled the Kuomintang.

== Administration ==
The governance of Hanzhong, including the municipal executive, the legislature and the judiciary are located in Hantai District (汉台区). The offices of the CCP and the Public Security Bureau are also located in Hantai District.

Hanzhong consists two urban districts and nine rural counties.

Map
Name	Chinese	Hanyu Pinyin	Population (2004 est.)	Area (km^{2})	Density (/km^{2})
Hantai District	汉台区	Hàntái Qū	530,000	556	954
Nanzheng District	南郑区	Nánzhèng Qū	550,000	2,849	193
Chenggu County	城固县	Chénggù Xiàn	510,000	2,265	225
Yang County	洋县	Yáng Xiàn	440,000	3,206	137
Xixiang County	西乡县	Xīxiāng Xiàn	400,000	3,204	125
Mian County	勉县	Miǎn Xiàn	420,000	2,406	175
Ningqiang County	宁强县	Níngqiáng Xiàn	330,000	3,243	102
Lueyang County	略阳县	Lüèyáng Xiàn	200,000	2,831	71
Zhenba County	镇巴县	Zhènbā Xiàn	280,000	3,437	81
Liuba County	留坝县	Liúbà Xiàn	50,000	1,970	25
Foping County	佛坪县	Fópíng Xiàn	30,000	1,279	23

== Economy ==
In 2021, the Hanzhong regional gross domestic product was 176.87 billion yuan. The annual gross domestic product per capita was 55279 yuan.

=== Military industry ===
The 012 base was established in Hanzhong in the 1960s. It is responsible for military transport aircraft and Air-to-air missiles in Yangxian County.

== Geography ==
Hanzhong

Climate chart (precipitation, max. and min. temperature)
J	F	M	A	M	J	J	A	S	O	N	D
7.4 7 0	12 10 2	28 15 6	50 21 11	89 26 16	95 29 20	163 30 22	139 30 22	141 25 17	73 19 12	31 13 6	9.7 8 1
- █ Average max. and min. temperatures in °C
- █ Precipitation totals in mm
- Source: CMA
Imperial conversion
J	F	M	A	M	J	J	A	S	O	N	D
0.3 45 32	0.5 50 36	1.1 59 43	2 70 52	3.5 78 60	3.7 83 67	6.4 86 72	5.5 85 71	5.6 76 63	2.9 66 54	1.2 56 43	0.4 46 34
- █ Average max. and min. temperatures in °F
- █ Precipitation totals in inches

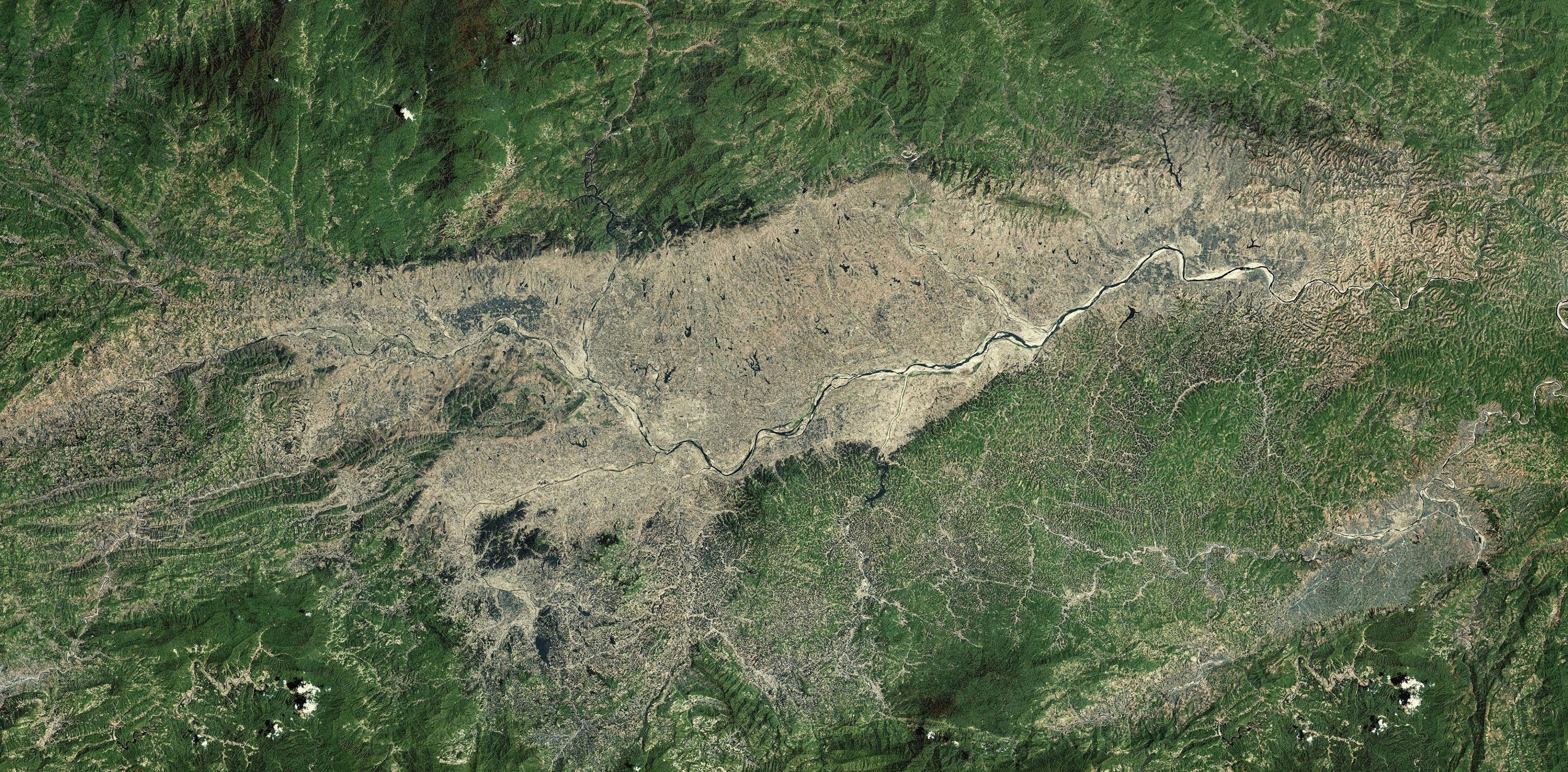
Satellite view of the Hanzhong Basin, via NASA.

Hanzhong is located in southwestern Shaanxi, near the border with Gansu and Sichuan Provinces. It is part of the Shannan region. Hanzhong lies in the centre of the Hanzhong Basin, on the banks of the Han River (Hanshui).

The Daba Mountains rise to the south of the city. To the north are the Qin Mountains. These mountains make a northern geographical limit of southern China. However, officially, Shaanxi is part of the northwest. For more on the divisions between northern and southern China, see Northern and southern China.

The coordinates of the city's prefecture ranges in latitude from 33° 02' to 33° 22' N and in longitude from 106° 51' to 107° 10' E. It covers 27,246 square kilometres (10,520 sq mi). The northern part of the prefecture is elevated while the southern part is generally low lying. Height above sea level varies from around 500 metres (1,600 ft) in the urban area to 2,038 metres (6,686 ft) in the Qin Mountains.

The Wuchiapingian Age in the Permian Period of geological time is named from Wuchiaping (from Chinese: 吴家坪; pinyin: Wújiāpíng; lit. 'Wu Family Flatland') in the Liangshan area of Hanzhong.

=== Climate ===
Hanzhong has a temperate and humid climate. It is classified as humid subtropical (Köppen Cwa), with cool, dry winters and hot, humid summers.

The Qin Mountains to the north help shield the city from cold Siberian winds in the winter. Hence, the winter in Hanzhong is warmer than that at similar latitudes east of Shannan. This is despite Hanzhong's elevation and inland location.

In contrast, because of its elevation, Hanzhong summers are temperate, with average highs in July and August about 30 °C (86 °F). The area is far more humid than central and northern Shaanxi. In Hanzhong, there is 853 mm (33.6 in) precipitation annually, as compared to 553 mm (21.8 in) in Xi'an, the provincial capital. The chance of sunshine days per month varies from twenty-six percent in November and December to fifty percent in August. Hanzhong receives 1,569 hours of bright sunshine each year. The monthly 24-hour average temperature ranges from 2.8 °C (37.0 °F) in January to 25.6 °C (78.1 °F) in July. The annual mean is 14.67 °C (58.4 °F). Record extremes there have ranged from −10.1 °C (13.8 °F) on 14 January 1957 to 41.1 °C (106.0 °F) on 16 July 2025.

Climate data for Hanzhong, elevation 510 m (1,670 ft), (1991–2020 normals, extremes 1951–present)
Month	Jan	Feb	Mar	Apr	May	Jun	Jul	Aug	Sep	Oct	Nov	Dec	Year
Record high °C (°F)	20.3 (68.5)	22.7 (72.9)	30.9 (87.6)	34.4 (93.9)	37.4 (99.3)	40.5 (104.9)	41.1 (106.0)	40.6 (105.1)	37.8 (100.0)	31.4 (88.5)	24.8 (76.6)	18.4 (65.1)	41.1 (106.0)
Mean daily maximum °C (°F)	7.5 (45.5)	10.7 (51.3)	16.1 (61.0)	22.3 (72.1)	26.1 (79.0)	29.0 (84.2)	30.9 (87.6)	30.6 (87.1)	25.0 (77.0)	19.3 (66.7)	13.4 (56.1)	8.2 (46.8)	19.9 (67.9)
Daily mean °C (°F)	3.2 (37.8)	6.1 (43.0)	10.8 (51.4)	16.4 (61.5)	20.4 (68.7)	24.1 (75.4)	26.3 (79.3)	25.7 (78.3)	20.8 (69.4)	15.3 (59.5)	9.3 (48.7)	4.2 (39.6)	15.2 (59.4)
Mean daily minimum °C (°F)	0.2 (32.4)	2.8 (37.0)	6.9 (44.4)	11.9 (53.4)	16.1 (61.0)	20.1 (68.2)	22.5 (72.5)	22.0 (71.6)	17.8 (64.0)	12.7 (54.9)	6.6 (43.9)	1.5 (34.7)	11.8 (53.2)
Record low °C (°F)	−10.1 (13.8)	−8.4 (16.9)	−4.8 (23.4)	−1.1 (30.0)	5.7 (42.3)	10.0 (50.0)	15.1 (59.2)	14.1 (57.4)	7.9 (46.2)	−1.3 (29.7)	−3.9 (25.0)	−10.0 (14.0)	−10.1 (13.8)
Average precipitation mm (inches)	6.3 (0.25)	11.2 (0.44)	28.2 (1.11)	53.9 (2.12)	87.4 (3.44)	99.5 (3.92)	144.3 (5.68)	118.2 (4.65)	141.1 (5.56)	77.1 (3.04)	33.1 (1.30)	7.9 (0.31)	808.2 (31.82)
Average precipitation days (≥ 0.1 mm)	4.7	5.3	8.2	9.5	11.6	11.8	12.6	11.2	13.2	12.4	8.5	5.2	114.2
Average snowy days	3.2	1.8	0.6	0	0	0	0	0	0	0	0.4	1.3	7.3
Average relative humidity (%)	77	74	71	72	72	75	78	78	83	86	86	81	78
Mean monthly sunshine hours	74.4	78.3	120.7	155.0	169.4	170.2	191.7	188.2	108.9	87.6	72.5	74.8	1,491.7
Percentage possible sunshine	23	25	32	40	39	40	44	46	30	25	23	24	33
Source: China Meteorological AdministrationNOAA all-time extreme temperature

=== Cityscape ===
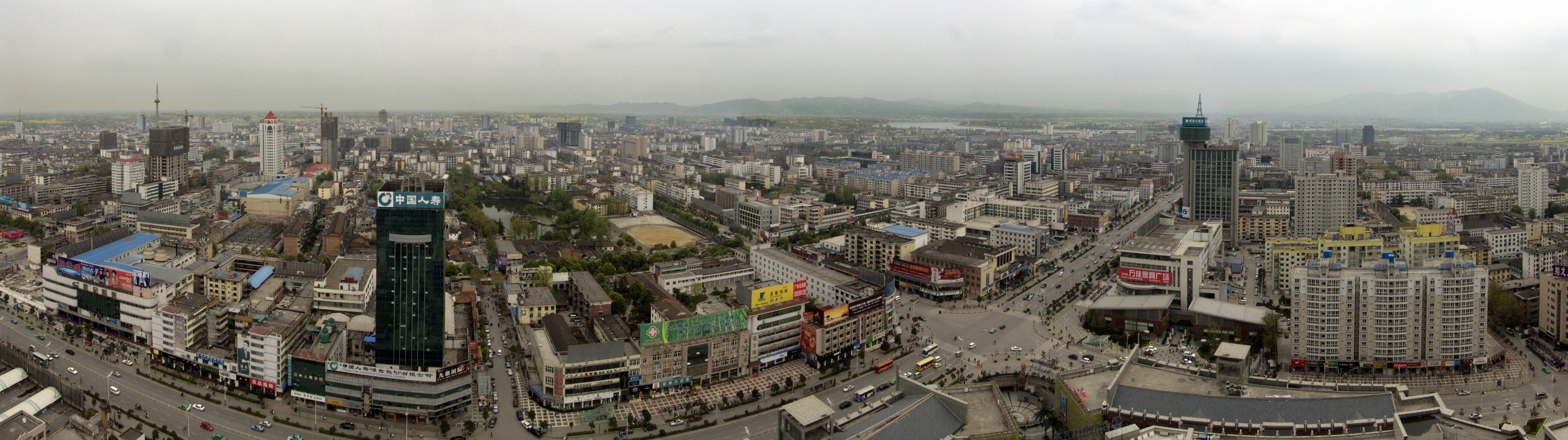
Panorama of southeastern Hanzhong.
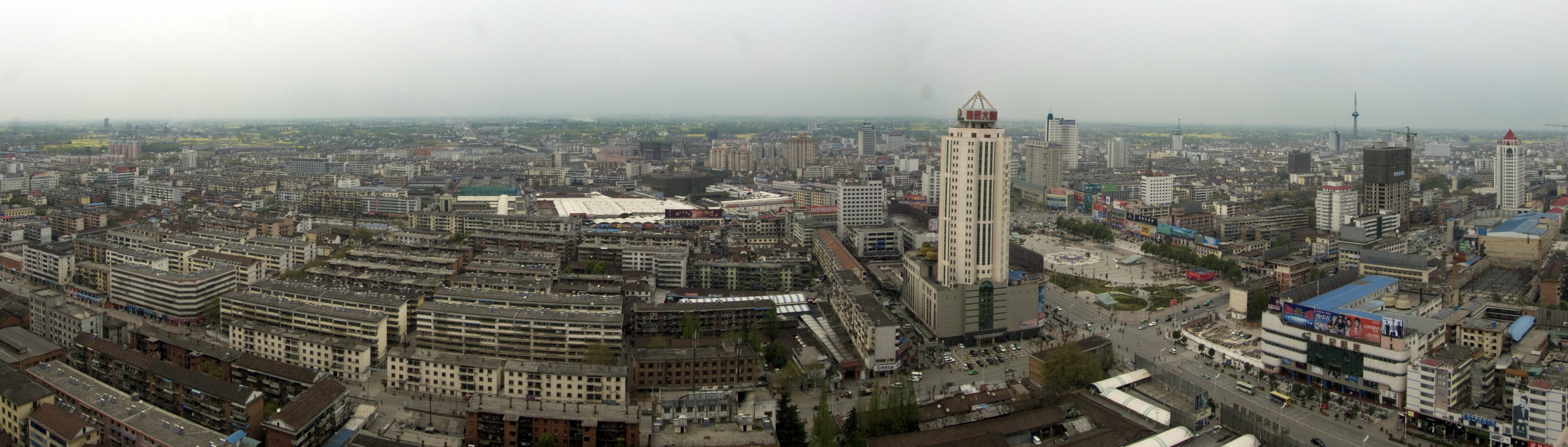
Panorama of northern Hanzhong.

== Transport ==
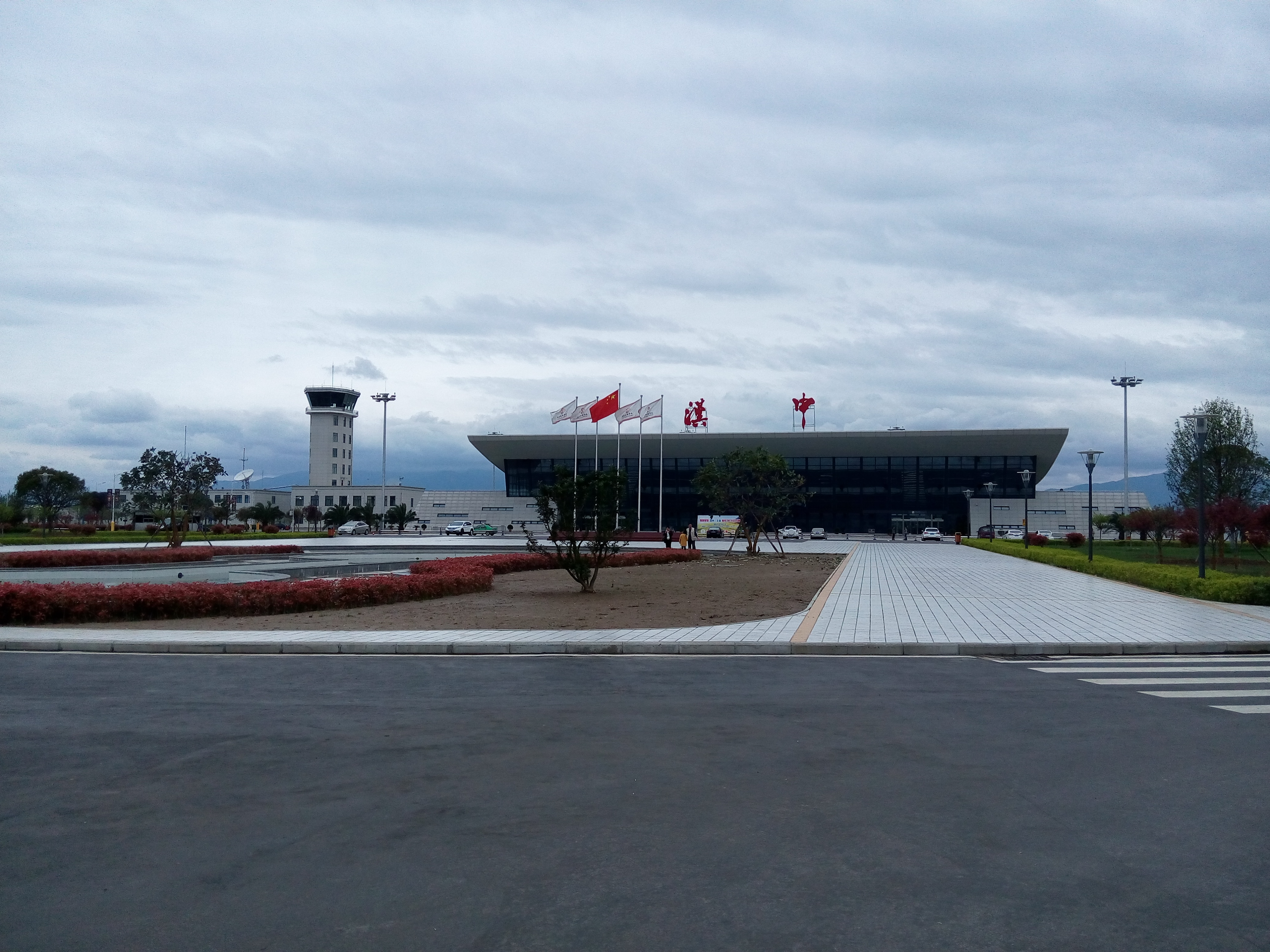
Hanzhong Chenggu Airport

Hanzhong's transport needs are served by the Hanzhong Chenggu Airport and Yangpingguan–Ankang Railway. Hanzhong Airport provides air access to Beijing, Xi'an, Shanghai and Shenzhen with daily flights to each.

Hanzhong railway station lies in downtown Hanzhong, and is served by the Xi'an–Chengdu high-speed railway and Yangpingguan–Ankang railway lines.

Hanzhong is also part of a national system of highways. It joins the G5 Beijing-Kunming expressway and the G7011 Shiyan-Hanzhong-Tianshui expressway. National Highway 108, China National Highway 316, China National Highway 210 and the provincial roads 211 and 309 constitute the developed traffic network of Hanzhong.

== Education ==
At the end of 2012, Hanzhong had two hundred and seven middle schools and several centres of higher education.

- Shaanxi University of Technology
- Shaanxi Aviation Vocational College
- Shaanxi Institute of Aeronautical Technology
- Hanzhong Vocational Technical College

== Sights ==
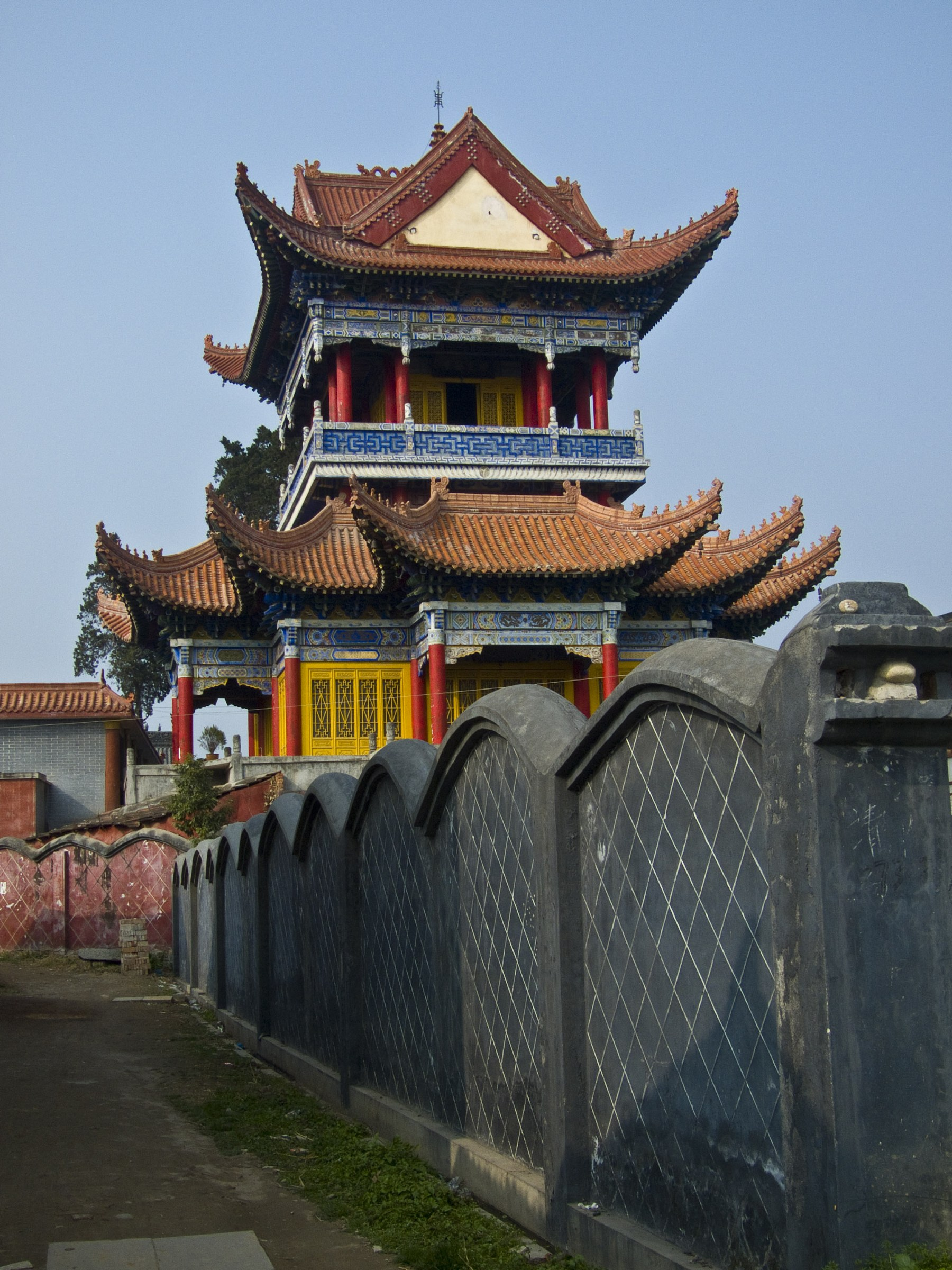
Taoist temple in Hanzhong City

- Hanzhong Museum
- Zhangqian Memorial Museum
- Baijiang Platform
- Ancient Hutou Bridge
- Qingmuchuan Ancient Town
- Liping National Forest Park

== See also ==
- Janssen Pharmaceutica
