= G5 Beijing–Kunming Expressway =

Expressway in China

Beijing–Kunming Expressway
- 北京－昆明高速公路
- Jingkun Expressway 京昆高速公路
- Beijing–Kunming Expressway is highlighted in red.

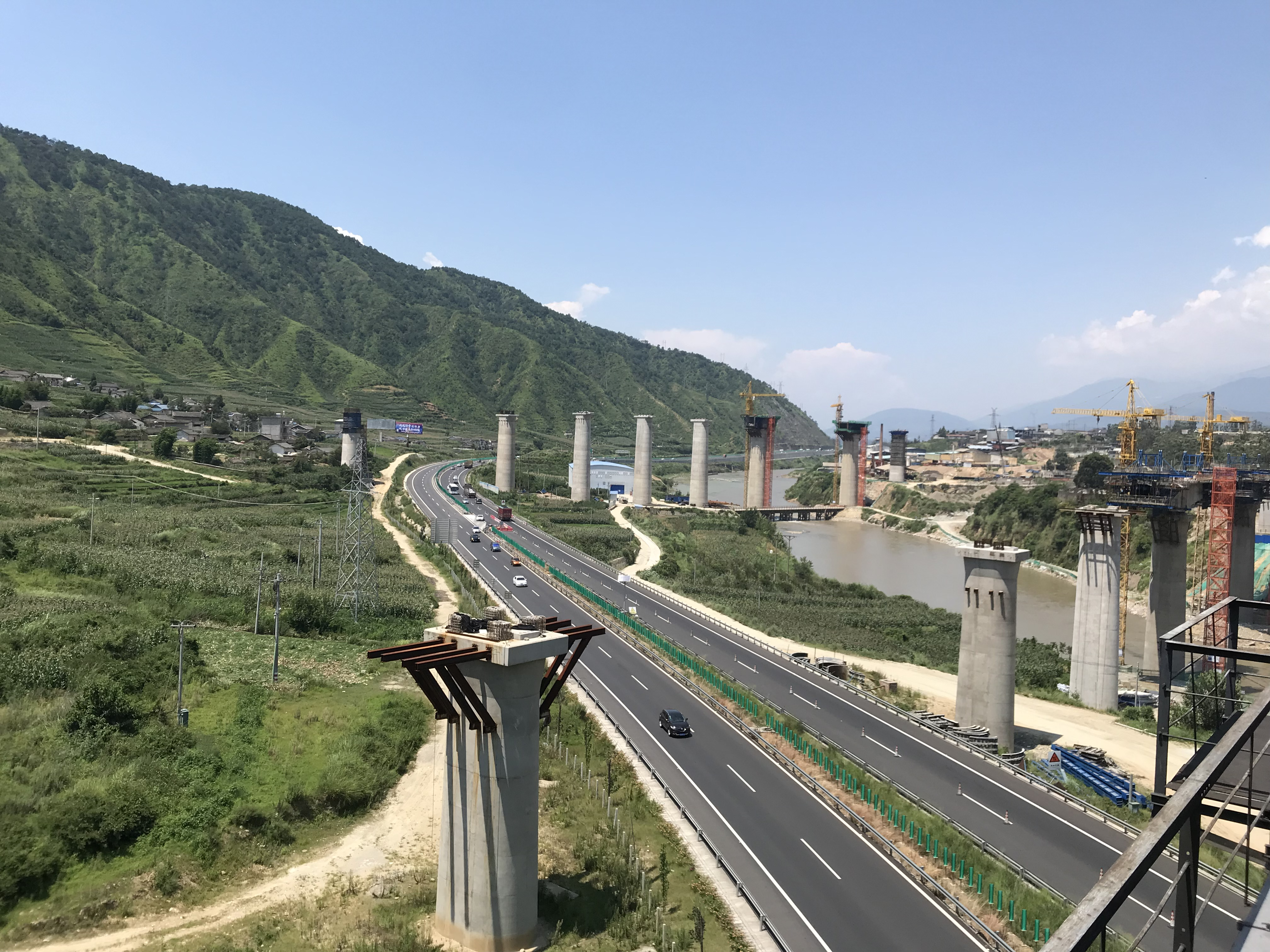
- G5 in Lugu Town, Mianning County, Sichuan

Route information
- Length: 2,865 km (1,780 mi)

Major junctions
- North end: Beijing (when complete); Laishui County, Hebei (current)
- South end: Kunming, Yunnan

Location
- Country: China

Highway system
- National Trunk Highway System; Primary; Auxiliary; National Highways; Transport in China
← G0425	→ G0511

The Beijing–Kunming Expressway (Chinese: 北京－昆明高速公路), designated as G5 and commonly referred to as the Jingkun Expressway (Chinese: 京昆高速公路) is an expressway that connects the cities of Beijing, and Kunming, in Yunnan province. It is 2,865 km (1,780 mi) in length. As of 2018, the expressway had been completed in its entirety.

== Route ==
The Beijing–Kunming Expressway runs from Beijing, the capital of the People's Republic of China, to Kunming, in the Yunnan Province. It passes through the following major cities:

- Beijing
- Shijiazhuang, Hebei
- Taiyuan, Shanxi
- Xi'an, Shaanxi
- Chengdu, Sichuan
- Kunming, Yunnan

The 240-kilometre section in Sichuan province from Ya'an to Xichang, known as the Yaxi Expressway, is nicknamed the ladder to heaven. It was completed in 2012 and includes 270 viaducts and 25 bridges.

== Detailed itinerary ==
From Beijing
Continues as Jingliang Road
Under Construction
	West G4501 6th Ring Road
	S208 Road; Towards Qinglonghu-Xinzhen
	S317 Road; Fangshan
	S333 Road; Zhoukoudian
	X011 Road; Hancunhe
	S318 Road; Towards Changgou-Zhoukoudian
	X024 Road; Towards Changgou
	S318 Road; Towards Zhangfang
Beijing City; Hebei Province
Toll Station
	Shiting
	G95 Capital Ring Expressway
	Laishui
	S10 Zhangshi Expressway; S24 Langzhuo Expressway; Both to be renamed G9511 Lailai Expressway
113	S058 Road; Towards Gaoli
Dingxing Service Area
	S059 Road; Towards Yaocun
130	G18 Rongwu Expressway
	Baoding Connecting Line; Towards Baoding
149	S332 Road; Towards Mancheng-Baoding
158	Towards S232 Road; Shunping
Shunping Service Area
171	S52 Baofu Expressway
179	S232 Road; Tangxian
Tangxian Service Area
207	S382 Road; Quyang
Quyang Service Area
Xingtang Service Area
237	S203 Road; Xingtang
247	S232 Road; Xingtang
Lingshou Service Area
264	S201 Road; Lingshou
268	S201 Road; Lingshou-Quyangqiao
	G2001 Shijiazhuang Ring Expressway
Under Construction
	S232 Road; Licun
Under Construction
	S071 Xibaipo Expressway
Concurrent with S071 Xibaipo Expressway
Shijiazhuang-North Service Area
	S205 Road; Pingshan
Concurrent with S071 Xibaipo Expressway
	S071 Xibaipo Expressway
Under Construction
	Sunzhuang
Hebei Province; Shanxi Province
Toll Station
Under Construction
	Xinanyu
	S45 Tianli Expressway
	Hedi
Yuxian Service Area
	G2002 Yangquan Ring Expressway; S216 Road; Yuxian
	S314 Road; Dongliang
Yangqu Service Area
	S314 Road; Towards Donghuangshui-Yangqu
	G55 Erguang Expressway
Taiyuan Metropolitan Area
(87)	G2001 Taiyuan Ring Expressway
Concurrent with G2001 Taiyuan Ring Expressway
(81)	S50 Pinglin Expressway
Taiyuan Service Area
(74)	Xinlan Road; Taiyuan-Centre; North University of China Fu Shan's Hometown; Lianhuatai Clay Sculptures
Fenhe Grand Bridge
(67)	Chaihua Line; Taiyuan-Centre Mount Jue Wei
(61)	S56 Taigu Expressway; Xinghua W Street; Taiyuan-Centre
(56)	Yingze W Street; Taiyuan-Centre China Coal Museum Taoyuan West Bus Terminal Taoyuan West Bus Terminal Station
(53)	Changfeng W Street; Taiyuan-Centre
(50)	Yeyu Street; Taiyuan-Centre Shentanggou
Concurrent with G2001 Taiyuan Ring Expressway
(44 A-B)	G20 Qingyin Expressway; G2001 Taiyuan Ring Expressway; S039 Road; Taiyuan-Jinyuan; Jinci Street; Taiyuan-Centre
Concurrent with G20 Qingyin Expressway
496	S039 Road; Yingbin Road; Taiyuan-Jinyuan; Jinci Jinci Temple; Mount Tianlong
Taiyuan Metropolitan Area
512	Mayu-Qingxu
Qingxu Service Area
	G307 Road; Dongyu
Concurrent with G20 Qingyin Expressway
525	G20 Qingyin Expressway
	X433 Road; Nan'an-Nanzhuang
	S60 Yuqi Expressway
548	S320 Road; Qixian Qiao's Courthouse
Pingyao Service Area
573	S222 Road; Pingyao Pingyao Historical City
	S66 Hefen Expressway
583	X382 Road; Zhanglan; Towards S221 Road
601	S221 Road; Jiexiu Zhangbi Old Fortress; Jiexiu Houtu Temple
617	S221 Road; Jingsheng-Lingshi Wang's Courtyard; Mount Mianshan Scenic Spot
Lingshi Service Area
635	Huodong Avenue; Huozhou
	S70 Liyong Expressway (To be renamed G2211 Changyan Expressway)
Huozhou Service Area
684	G108 Road; Hongtong
	G0511 Mingqu Expressway
698	S323 Road; Hongdong
	G0501 Linfen Ring Expressway
Linfen Metropolitan Area
710	S329 Road; S224 Road; Tumen-Weicun
Linfen Service Area
723	Yingbin Avenue; G309 Road; Linfen-Centre Yao Mausoleum; Gushe Mountain Resort
Linfen Metropolitan Area
	G22 Qinglan Expressway
744	S231 Road; Xiangfen
767	X542 Road; Towards S232 Road; Zhaokang
Xiangfan Service Area
	S75 Houping Expressway; S80 Linghou Expressway
779	X799 Road; Xinjiang
799	S233 Road; Jishan
	S85 Yourui Expressway
Hejin Service Area
822	G209 Road; Hejin
	G108 Road; Hejin
Hejin Toll Station
Longmen Yellow River Bridge
Shanxi Province; Shaanxi Province
Youmenkou Toll Station
844	G108 Road; Longmen-Xizhuang
856	Towards G108 Road; Hancheng
Hancheng Service Area
Zhichuan Viaduct Bridge
873	G108 Road; Zhichuan Sima Qian's Tomb and Memorial
901	Qiachuan Ave; Towards G108 Road; Heyang
Chengcheng Service Area
934	G108 Road; S202 Road; Tihu-Weizhuang; Towards Chengcheng-Dali
	S20 Yushang Expressway (To be renamed G65E Yulan Expressway)
952	X214 Road; Towards G108 Road; Sunzhen
	Weipu Expressway
968	S201 Road; Puncheng
984	X219 Road; Jingyao
Fuping Service Area
1009	X314 Road; Towards S106 Road; Fuping
1017	Renmin W Road; Yangliang Yangliang Aviation Town
	G3021 Linxing Expressway
1035	S Ring Road W Towards G210 Road; Gaoling
Xi'an Metropolitan Area
	Xi'an International Trade & Logistics Park
1052 (4 A-B)	G3001 Xi'an Ring Expressway; G30 Lianhuo Expressway; G65 Baomao Expressway; G70 Fuyin Expressway; E 3rd Ring Road; N 3rd Ring Road; Xi'an-Baqiao; X210 Road Xi'an International Trade & Logistics Park
Concurrent with G3001 Xi'an Ring Expressway; G30 Lianhuo Expressway; G65 Baomao Expressway; G70 Fuyin Expressway
Concurrent with G30 Lianhuo Expressway
(1 A-B)	G30 Lianhuo Expressway; Xi'an-East
(78)	G40 Hushan Expressway
Concurrent with G70 Fuyin Expressway
(76)	G70 Fuyin Expressway; Changle E Road; Towards E 3rd Ring Road Fangzhicheng Station Towards Xi'an Banpo Museum
(72)	Xianning E Road; Towards E 3rd Ring Road
Chanhe Bridge
Concurrent with G65 Baomao Expressway
(63)	G65 Baomao Expressway; S 3rd Ring Road; Qujiang Road; Qujiangchi N Road Towards Dayanta
Qujiang Service Area
(57 A-B)	Chang'an Road; S 3rd Ring Road; Xi'an-South; Chang'an District Huizhan Zhongxin Station; Sanyao Station
(52)	G210 Road; Taibai Road
Concurrent with G3001 Xi'an Ring Expressway
1099 A-B (46 A-B)	G3001 Xi'an Ring Expressway; Keji 8th Road; Towards W 3rd Ring Road; Towards Zhangba Road
Xi'an Metropolitan Area
	Sanxing Express Road; Xinglong-Fenghui
1117	X105 Road; Huxian
1132	Guanzhong Ring Road; Shijing Louguantai; Heihe Forest Park
1142	Zhifang
Dingxing Service Area
1157	Huacai Road; Zhuque Zhuque National Forest Park
Zhuque Service Area
1190	X302 Road; Huangguan-Youfangping
1219	Towards X225 Road; Towards G210 Road; Ningshan-Tongchewan Shangbahe National Forest Park
Ningshan Service Area
1243	X207 Road; X207 Road; Towards G210 Road; Towards Shiquan
1264	G108 Road; Jinshui
1285	G108 Road; Longting Cai Lun Tomb
Yangxian Service Area
1296	X207 Road; Towards G108 Road; Yangxian
Hanjiang Service Area
1314	G136 Road; Towards G108 Road; Chenggu Towards Zhangqian Memorial Museum
1329	G108 Road; Shangyuanguan
1331 A-B	G7011 Shitian Expressway
	Hanzhong East Connecting Line; Towards G108 Road; Towards G316 Road; Hanzhong-Puzhen
Hanzhong Service Area
1353	S211 Road; Towards G108 Road; Hanzhong
	G85 Yinkun Expressway
1386	X218 Road; Mianxian-Yuandun
Mianxian Service Area
1412	X103 Road; Hujiaba
1434	X103 Road; Tiesuoguan
Ningqiang Service Area
1444	X103 Road; Ningqiang
Ningqiang Toll Station
	G108 Road; Huangbayi
Shaanxi Province; Sichuan Province
Zhongzi Service Area
	G108 Road; Zhongzi
Zhongzi Toll Station
1510	Chaotian Snow Cave Creek
1521	G108 Road; G212 Road; Guangyuan
	Towards Baolun
1531	G75 Lanhai Expressway
1550	G108 Road; Jiange Jianmen Shudao Site
1589	X105 Road; X112 Road; Zhuyuan
1606	Houba
Xin'an Service Area
	S320 Road; Xin'an-Jiangyou
	Guanshan-Jiangyou
	Dayan-Jiangyou
	G93 Chengyu Ring Expressway G85 Pingmian Expressway
1664	Mianyang-Academic City
Mianyang Fujiang Bridge
	S205 Road; Mianyang
1675	Jiuzhou Ave. Mianyang
	G108 Road; Mianxing W Ave. Mianyang
	S1 Chengmian Expressway Double Line; S40 Ximian Expressway
1695	G108 Road; Jinshan
	Luojiang-Wan'an
	Towards G108 Road; Baimaguan
	G108 Road; Huangxu-Dexin
	S106 Road; Deyang-Centre
1737	Jinshahiang W Road; Taishan S Road 2nd Section; Deyang-South Deyang-South Service Area
1748	Beijing Ave; Towards G108 Road; Guanghan-North
	Zhongshan Ave S 4th Section; Guanghan-Centre Sanxingdui
	G4202 Chengdu Second Ring Expressway
1761	Hongyang Road; S101 Road; Qingbaijiang
1765 A-B	Huoyun Ave; Towards G108 Road; Xindu-Xiangfu
1772	Xindu Ave; Rongcheng Ave E Xindu
1777 (6)	G4201 Chengdu Ring Expressway; XA45 Northern City Exit Motorway
Concurrent with G4201 Chengdu Ring Expressway
(9)	Longtan Road; Chengdu-Centre Longtan Temple
(16)	G42 Hurong Expressway; Chengdu-Centre
	S3 Cheng'an Expressway
(23)	G76 Xiarong Expressway
(29)	Chenglong Ave; Chengdu-Centre; Longquanyi
Chengdu Metropolitan Area
(34)	G4215 Rongzun Expressway jinyang Ave; Chengdu-Centre
(34 C)	G213 Road; Kehua Rd; Chengdu-Centre Fangzhicheng Station
(41)	Jiannan Ave; Chengdu-Centre; Huayang
Chengdu Metropolitan Area
Concurrent with G4201 Chengdu Ring Expressway
1812 A B (41 A B)	G4201 Chengdu Ring Expressway; Chengdu-Centre
Chengdu Toll Station
1818	Shuanghua Rd; Changcheng Rd; Shualgliu-Huayang
1822	Muhua Rd; Huangjia-Gongxing Huanglongxi
1831	G4202 Chengdu Second Ring Expressway
1834	Xinpu Rd; Puxin-Xinjin Xinjin Service Area
1841	S103 Road; Xinjin
1847	G0512 Chengle Expressway
1862	Huilong
1869	Shou'an
1881	Chaoyang Ave; Pujiang
Pujiang Service Area
1896	Chengjia
1906	Towards G108 Road; Hongxing
1917	S8 Chengqiongming Expressway
1927	Towards G108 Road; Mingshan
1930	G93 Chengyu Ring Expressway
1931	G108 Road; Ya'an East, Jinjiguan
1939	Ya'an North, Bifengxia
1943	G108 Road, G318 Road; Ya'an
1950	G108 Road; Babu
1972	G108 Road; Yingjing
Yingjing Service Area
1982	Longcanggou
2018	G108 Road; Juxiang
	G108 Road; Hanyuan
Shimian Service Area
2062	G108 Road; Shimian
2094	G108 Road; Liziping
Pusagang Service Area
2133	G108 Road; Yihai
	G108 Road; Mianning
Mianning Service Area
2212	G108 Road; Lugu
2221	G108 Road; Manshuiwan
	Shaba
2241	G108 Road; Lizhou
2250	G108 Road; Anning
2258	Chang'an Rd; G108 Road; Xichang
2275	S307 Road; Youjun
	G108 Road; Huangshui
2314	G108 Road; Dechang
Dechang Service Area
	G108 Road; Jinsha
2349	G108 Road; Yonglang
	Baima; S214 Road
2385	S214 Road; Miyi
Miyi Service Area
	S214 Road; Yakou
2430	Xinjiu
Panzhihua Service Area
	S310 Road; Panzhihua
	Panzhihua-Jinshajiang
	G4216 Rongli Expressway
	Panzhihua
2442	S214 Road; Panzhihua-Zongfa
	S214 Road; Datian
Datian Service Area
	G108 Road; Pingdi
Tianfang Toll Station
Sichuan Province; Yunnan Province
Yongren-Fengshan Toll Station
2518	G108 Road; Yongren
Yongren Service Area
2548	G108 Road; Julin-Hangguayuan
2562	G108 Road; Yuanmou Yuanmou Man Museum
Yuanmou Service Area
2584	Yangjie
Maojie Service Area
2621	Maojie
	Yongquan
Wuding Service Area
	Wuding; Towards G108 Road
	Lujin
	G108 Road; Luomian
	G108 Road; Fumin
Fumin Service Area
Fumin Toll Station
Kunming Metropolitan Area
2706	S0501 Kunming Ring Expressway
2710	3rd Ring Road
	2nd Ring Road
Continues as 2nd Ring Road
Towards Beijing
