= G9511 Laishui–Laiyuan Expressway =

Road in Hebei, China

Laishui–Laiyuan Expressway
- 涞水－涞源高速公路

Route information
- Length: 110.5 km (68.7 mi)

Major junctions
- West end: G18 in Laiyuan County, Hebei
- G5 in Yi County, Hebei
- East end: G95 in Laishui County, Hebei

Location
- Country: China

Highway system
- National Trunk Highway System; Primary; Auxiliary; National Highways; Transport in China
← G95	→ G98

The Laishui–Laiyuan Expressway (Chinese: 涞水－涞源高速公路), designated as G9511 and commonly referred to as the Lailai Expressway (Chinese: 涞涞高速), is an expressway located in Hebei, China which serves as a branch of the G95 Capital Ring Expressway. The total length of the route is 110.5 kilometers, and the whole route is located within the jurisdiction of Baoding, of which the mountainous and hilly sections account for more than half of the total length of the entire route.

== History ==
Construction of the first section started on 30 September 2007, and was opened to traffic on 25 October 2010 with a total length of 33.5 kilometers. On 23 December 2011, the section from Laishui Interchange to Xiling Town in Laishui County opened to traffic with a total length of 26.54 kilometers. On 22 December 2012, the section from Laiyuan South Interchange to Xiling Interchange with a total length of 66.7 kilometers opened to traffic.

Originally the expressway was numbered as the S66 Tanglai Expressway until 2018, when the Hebei Provincial Transportation Administration replaced the route signage, mileposts and other facilities along the expressway.
