= S2202 Linfen Ring Expressway =

Orbital road around Linfen, China

Linfen Ring Expressway

Route information
- Auxiliary route of G5
- Length: 15.9 km (9.9 mi)

Major junctions
- Orbital around Linfen

Location
- Country: China
- Province: Shanxi

Highway system
- Transport in China

The Linfen Ring Expressway (Chinese: 临汾绕城高速), designated as S2202 (formerly G0501 before 2019), is an expressway in Southern Central China going around the city of Linfen. This expressway is a branch of G5 Jingkun Expressway.

== Route ==
Counterclockwise
G5 Jingkun Expressway
S224 Road; Hongdong
G108 Road; Ganting-Hongdong
G0511 Mingqu Expressway
Under Construction
G309 Road; Quting
G22 Qinglan Expressway
Clockwise
