= Ningqiang County =

Coordinates: 32°49′N 106°15′E

Ningqiang County 宁强县 Ningkiang
- County
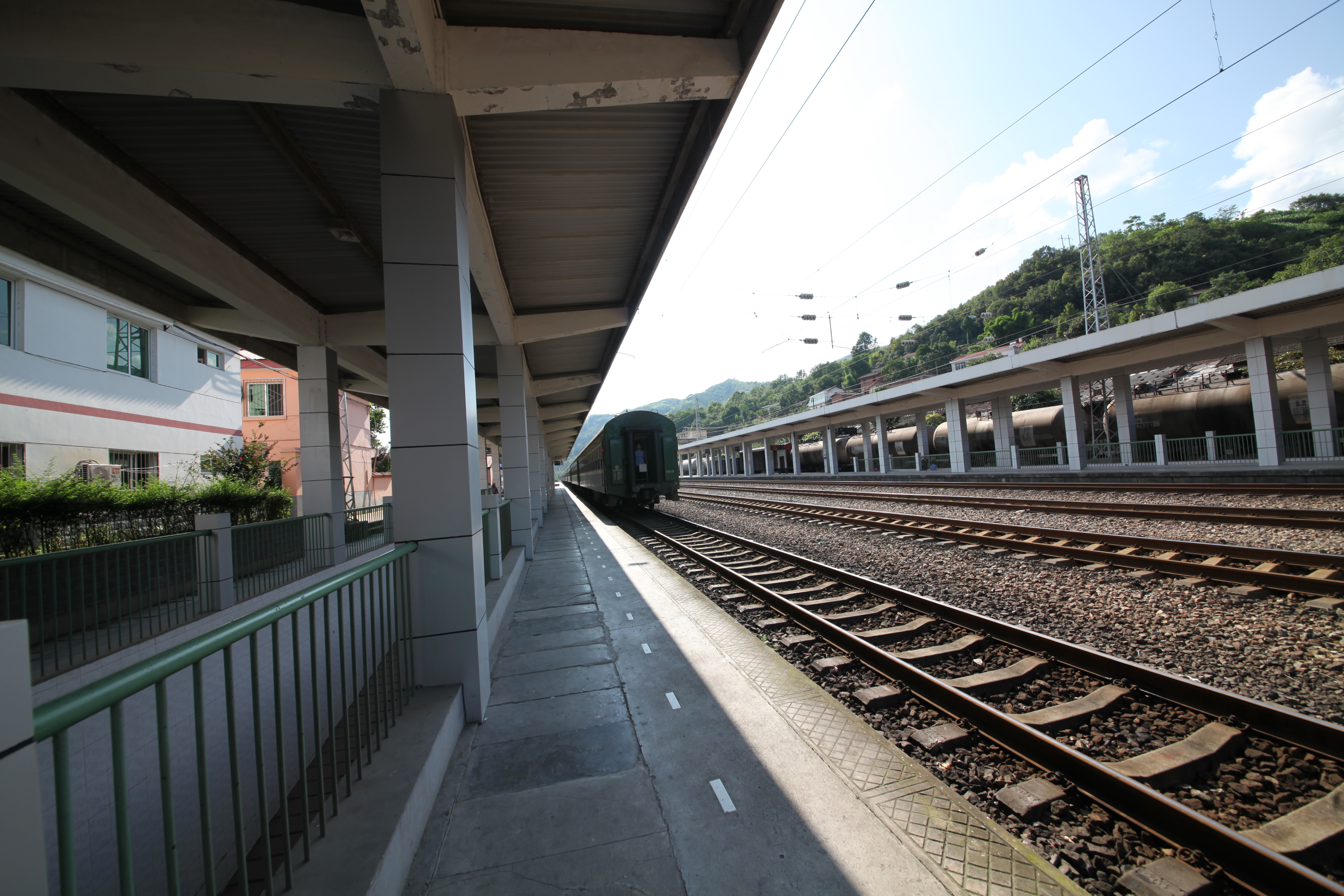
- Station along the Yangpingguan–Ankang railway

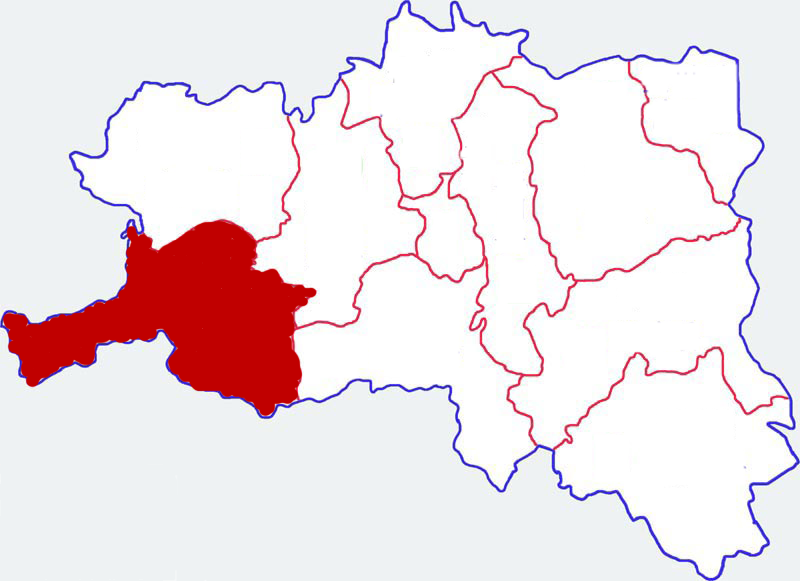
- Location in Hanzhong

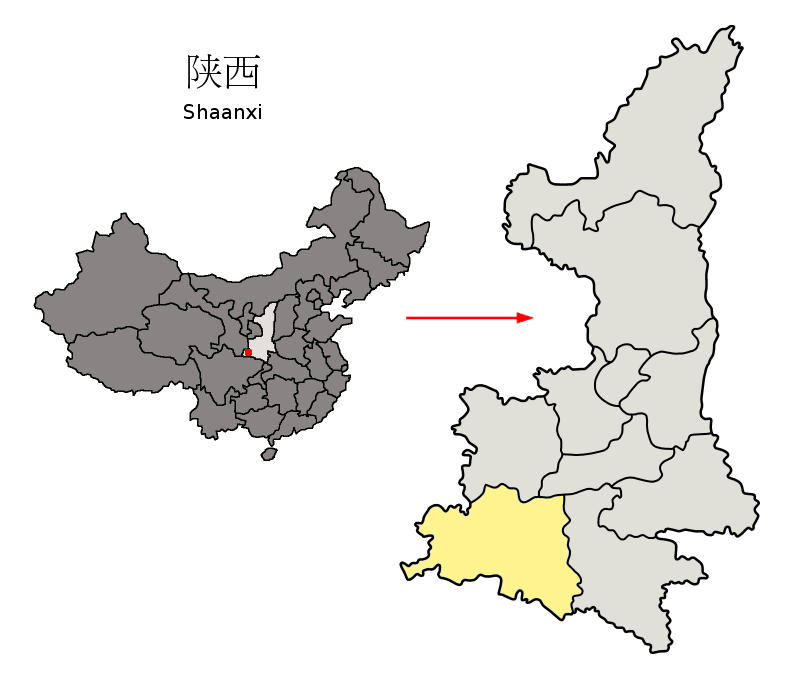
- Hanzhong in Shaanxi
- Country: People's Republic of China
- Province: Shaanxi
- Prefecture-level city: Hanzhong

Area
  - Total: 3,246 km^{2} (1,253 sq mi)
- Elevation: 800 m (2,600 ft)
- Highest elevation: 2,103.7 m (6,902 ft)
- Lowest elevation: 520 m (1,710 ft)

Population (2019)
  - Total: 324,318
  - Density: 99.91/km^{2} (258.8/sq mi)
- Time zone: UTC+8 (China standard time)
- Postal code: 724400
- Licence plates: 陕F
- Website: www.nq.gov.cn

Ningqiang County (simplified Chinese: 宁强县; traditional Chinese: 寧強縣; pinyin: Níngqiáng Xiàn) is a county and both the southwesternmost and westernmost county-level division of Shaanxi province, China, bordering both Sichuan and Gansu. It is under the administration of Hanzhong City. The source of the Han River is located in the county.

Ningqiang is one of the counties with a sizable number of Qiang and Yi minorities.

As a result of the 2008 Sichuan earthquake, 500 buildings in the county collapsed and seven people were killed, making it the worst hit area in Shaanxi.

== Administration ==
The county executive, legislature and judiciary are in Hanyuan Subdistrict (汉源街道); though like many shiretowns it is conventionally also known as Chengguan (城关镇), together with the CPC and PSB branches.

Subdistricts (街道; jiēdào)

- Hanyuan Subdistrict (汉源街道), county seat
- Gaozhaizi Subdistrict (高寨子街道)

Towns (镇; zhèn)

the County oversees sixteen other towns.

- Da'an (大安镇)
- Yangpingguan (阳平关镇)
- Daijiaba (代家坝镇)
- Yanzibian (燕子砭镇)
- Hujiaba (胡家坝镇)
- Tiesuoguan (铁锁关镇)
- Maobahe (毛坝河镇)
- Juting (巨亭镇)
- Bashan (巴山镇)
- Guangping (广坪镇)
- Shujiaba (舒家坝镇)
- Anlehe (安乐河镇)
- Erlangba (二郎坝镇)
- Qingmuchuan (青木川镇)
- Taiyangling (太阳岭镇)
- Shanjiayan (禅家岩镇)

== Climate ==
Climate data for Ningqiang, elevation 836 m (2,743 ft), (1991–2020 normals, extremes 1981–present)
Month	Jan	Feb	Mar	Apr	May	Jun	Jul	Aug	Sep	Oct	Nov	Dec	Year
Record high °C (°F)	17.6 (63.7)	22.0 (71.6)	30.5 (86.9)	32.7 (90.9)	35.3 (95.5)	36.3 (97.3)	38.6 (101.5)	39.1 (102.4)	35.8 (96.4)	29.3 (84.7)	23.1 (73.6)	17.7 (63.9)	39.1 (102.4)
Mean daily maximum °C (°F)	6.5 (43.7)	9.2 (48.6)	14.6 (58.3)	20.7 (69.3)	24.4 (75.9)	27.5 (81.5)	29.2 (84.6)	28.6 (83.5)	22.9 (73.2)	17.8 (64.0)	12.7 (54.9)	7.8 (46.0)	18.5 (65.3)
Daily mean °C (°F)	1.6 (34.9)	4.2 (39.6)	8.7 (47.7)	14.2 (57.6)	17.9 (64.2)	21.5 (70.7)	23.6 (74.5)	22.9 (73.2)	18.3 (64.9)	13.2 (55.8)	7.9 (46.2)	2.9 (37.2)	13.1 (55.5)
Mean daily minimum °C (°F)	−1.6 (29.1)	0.8 (33.4)	4.5 (40.1)	9.3 (48.7)	13.1 (55.6)	17.0 (62.6)	19.7 (67.5)	19.1 (66.4)	15.4 (59.7)	10.4 (50.7)	4.7 (40.5)	−0.4 (31.3)	9.3 (48.8)
Record low °C (°F)	−11.3 (11.7)	−8.8 (16.2)	−5.3 (22.5)	−0.8 (30.6)	4.4 (39.9)	9.2 (48.6)	13.8 (56.8)	12.3 (54.1)	6.5 (43.7)	−2.0 (28.4)	−4.7 (23.5)	−11.6 (11.1)	−11.6 (11.1)
Average precipitation mm (inches)	13.4 (0.53)	17.3 (0.68)	33.9 (1.33)	67.1 (2.64)	109.0 (4.29)	131.2 (5.17)	205.6 (8.09)	137.7 (5.42)	170.8 (6.72)	91.2 (3.59)	38.6 (1.52)	12.5 (0.49)	1,028.3 (40.47)
Average precipitation days (≥ 0.1 mm)	9.1	8.2	10.2	11.3	13.7	13.4	15.7	14.3	15.1	15.2	10.3	7.1	143.6
Average snowy days	8.3	4.3	1.2	0.2	0	0	0	0	0	0	0.8	3.2	18
Average relative humidity (%)	78	76	73	73	76	79	83	84	87	87	84	79	80
Mean monthly sunshine hours	87.6	79.2	116.2	156.9	178.0	171.6	180.7	174.9	102.6	91.6	86.4	93.9	1,519.6
Percentage possible sunshine	28	25	31	40	41	40	42	43	28	26	28	30	34
Source: China Meteorological Administrationall-time extreme temperatureall-time July high

== Transport ==
Ningqiang is served by the Yangpingguan Railway Station (阳平关站), which marks the start of the Yangpingguan–Ankang Railway, and the Ningqiangnan Railway Station (宁强南站), which is part of the Xi'an–Chengdu high-speed railway line, opened in 2017.

The G5 Beijing-Kunming expressway and National Highway 108 both pass through Ningqiang.
