= G0512 Chengdu–Leshan Expressway =

Expressway in Sichuan, China

Chengdu–Leshan Expressway
- 成都－乐山高速公路
- Chengle Expressway 成乐高速

Route information
- Length: 89.6 km (55.7 mi)
- Existed: 21 December 2014–present

Major junctions
- North end: Xinjin
- South end: Leshan

Location
- Country: China
- Province: Sichuan

Highway system
- National Trunk Highway System; Primary; Auxiliary; National Highways; Transport in China
← G0511	→ G0513

The G0512 Chengdu–Leshan Expressway (Chinese: 成乐高速公路) is an expressway in Sichuan, China. It was named S7, as of 2013 it is included in NTHS, hence renumbered.

== Detailed Itinerary ==
North to South
0(42)	G5 Jingkun Expressway
1(43)	S103 Road; Qinglong
11(53)	X072 Road; Pengshan
Pengshan Service Area
26(68)	S106 Road; Meishan
(81)	S40 Suihong Expressway
41(83)	Zhangkan
Jiajiang Tianfu Service Area
63(105)	Xinchang-Jiajiang
76(118)	S305 Road; Jiajiang
80(122)	S305 Road; Leshan North (Mianzhu)
86(128)	S306 Road; Leshan
89(795)	G93 Chengyu Ring Expressway
South to North
