= G0513 Pingyao–Luoyang Expressway =

Expressway in Shanxi and Henan provinces of China

Pingyao–Luoyang Expressway
- 平遥－洛阳高速公路
- Pingluo Expressway 平洛高速公路

Route information
- Length: 16.8 km (10.4 mi)

Major junctions
- North end: Pingyao
- South end: Luoyang

Location
- Country: China

Highway system
- National Trunk Highway System; Primary; Auxiliary; National Highways; Transport in China
← G0512	→ G6

The Pingyao–Luoyang Expressway (Chinese: 平遥－洛阳高速公路), designated as G0513 and commonly abbreviated as the Pingluo Expressway (Chinese: 平洛高速), is a north-south expressway start from Pingyao, Shanxi Province through Qinyuan, Anze, Qinshui, Yangcheng, Mengjin, to Luoyang, Henan Province. This expressway is a spur of G5 Jingkun Expressway.

== Detailed itinerary ==
From North to South
G5 Jingkun Expressway
Guangsheng Rd; Hongdong
G0501 Linfen Ring Expressway
From South to North
