= Wan'an, Hongtong County =

Wan'an 万安镇
- Town
- Location in Shanxi
- Coordinates: 36°18′34″N 111°34′33″E
- Country: People's Republic of China
- Province: Shanxi
- Prefecture-level city: Linfen
- County: Hongtong County

Area
  - Total: 158.29 km^{2} (61.12 sq mi)

Population (2018)
  - Total: 65,647
  - Density: 414.73/km^{2} (1,074.1/sq mi)
- Time zone: UTC+8 (China Standard)

Wan'an (simplified Chinese: 万安; traditional Chinese: 萬安; pinyin: Wàn'ān) is a town under the administration of Hongtong County, Shanxi, China. As of 2018, it has 57 villages under its administration. The town spans an area of 158.29 square kilometres (61.12 sq mi), and has a hukou population of 65,647 as of 2018.
