= Hejin =

Hejin 河津市 Hotsin
- County-level city
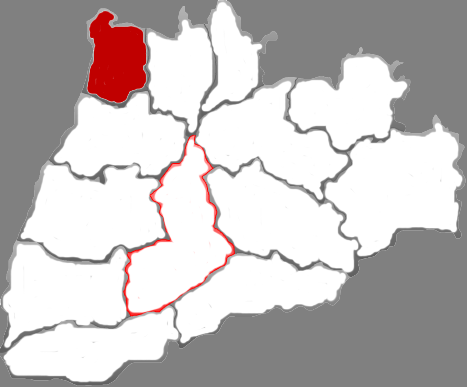
- Location in Yuncheng

- Location in Shanxi
- Coordinates: 35°35′46″N 110°42′43″E
- Country: People's Republic of China
- Province: Shanxi
- Prefecture-level city: Yuncheng
- City seat: Chengqu Subdistrict (城区街道)

Area
  - County-level city: 593.1 km^{2} (229.0 sq mi)
  - Urban: 131.80 km^{2} (50.89 sq mi)
- Elevation: 396 m (1,299 ft)

Population (2017)
  - County-level city: 401,000
  - Density: 676/km^{2} (1,750/sq mi)
  - Urban: 220,000
- Time zone: UTC+8 (China Standard)
- Postal code: 043300
- Area code: 0359
- Website: www.sxhj.gov.cn

Hejin (Chinese: 河津; pinyin: Héjīn) is a county-level city of Yuncheng City, in the southwest of Shanxi province, People's Republic of China, located on the east (left) bank of the Yellow River. It borders Jishan and Wanrong counties to the east and south, Linfen to the north, and Hancheng in Shaanxi across the Yellow River to the west. As of 2002, it had a population of 360,000 residing in an area of 593 km^{2} (229 sq mi). The city and its surrounding area is home to abundant aluminium reserves. During the Qin dynasty, Hejin was known as Pishi County (皮氏县; Píshì Xiàn), renamed to Longmen County (simplified Chinese: 龙门县; traditional Chinese: 龍門縣; pinyin: Lóngmén Xiàn) during the Northern Wei, and finally Hejin County (河津县; Héjīn Xiàn) in the Song dynasty. The city's name (河津) literally means "river ford", due to the need of a fording of the Yellow River at the time. In 1994, Hejin was upgraded to its present status as a county-level city.

== Administrative divisions ==
Hejin City administers two subdistricts, two towns, and five townships.

Subdistricts:

- Chengqu Subdistrict (城区街道)
- Qingjian Subdistrict (清涧街道)

Towns:

- Fancun (樊村镇)
- Senglou (僧楼镇)

Townships:

- Xiaoliang Township (小梁乡)
- Chaijia Township (柴家乡)
- Zhaojiazhuang Township (赵家庄乡)
- Xiahua Township (下化乡)
- Yangcun Township (阳村乡)

== Climate ==
Climate data for Hejin, elevation 459 m (1,506 ft), (1991–2020 normals, extremes 1981–2010)
Month	Jan	Feb	Mar	Apr	May	Jun	Jul	Aug	Sep	Oct	Nov	Dec	Year
Record high °C (°F)	14.4 (57.9)	20.5 (68.9)	29.0 (84.2)	36.5 (97.7)	39.6 (103.3)	41.3 (106.3)	41.0 (105.8)	38.8 (101.8)	39.5 (103.1)	32.5 (90.5)	24.1 (75.4)	16.4 (61.5)	41.3 (106.3)
Mean daily maximum °C (°F)	4.9 (40.8)	9.4 (48.9)	16.0 (60.8)	22.8 (73.0)	27.8 (82.0)	31.9 (89.4)	32.6 (90.7)	30.7 (87.3)	26.0 (78.8)	20.0 (68.0)	12.7 (54.9)	6.2 (43.2)	20.1 (68.1)
Daily mean °C (°F)	−0.1 (31.8)	3.8 (38.8)	9.8 (49.6)	16.3 (61.3)	21.4 (70.5)	25.7 (78.3)	27.2 (81.0)	25.5 (77.9)	20.6 (69.1)	14.5 (58.1)	7.4 (45.3)	1.2 (34.2)	14.4 (58.0)
Mean daily minimum °C (°F)	−4.3 (24.3)	−0.7 (30.7)	4.6 (40.3)	10.6 (51.1)	15.6 (60.1)	20.2 (68.4)	22.6 (72.7)	21.4 (70.5)	16.4 (61.5)	10.0 (50.0)	3.0 (37.4)	−2.9 (26.8)	9.7 (49.5)
Record low °C (°F)	−14.8 (5.4)	−15.2 (4.6)	−7.8 (18.0)	0.0 (32.0)	3.8 (38.8)	10.8 (51.4)	15.3 (59.5)	14.2 (57.6)	6.2 (43.2)	−2.2 (28.0)	−11.5 (11.3)	−13.7 (7.3)	−15.2 (4.6)
Average precipitation mm (inches)	4.5 (0.18)	7.2 (0.28)	12.8 (0.50)	29.0 (1.14)	43.1 (1.70)	51.7 (2.04)	89.9 (3.54)	92.4 (3.64)	72.6 (2.86)	41.7 (1.64)	16.8 (0.66)	3.2 (0.13)	464.9 (18.31)
Average precipitation days (≥ 0.1 mm)	2.4	2.8	3.8	5.7	7.0	7.6	10.6	9.5	9.1	6.8	4.3	2.0	71.6
Average snowy days	2.8	2.5	0.8	0.1	0	0	0	0	0	0	1.3	2.1	9.6
Average relative humidity (%)	46	47	47	50	52	55	67	70	70	65	58	48	56
Mean monthly sunshine hours	132.6	136.5	166.6	196.7	222.1	205.3	196.5	184.8	149.0	147.7	136.8	137.2	2,011.8
Percentage possible sunshine	43	44	45	50	51	47	45	45	41	43	45	45	45
Source: China Meteorological Administration

== Transportation ==
- G5 Beijing–Kunming Expressway
- China National Highway 108
- China National Highway 209

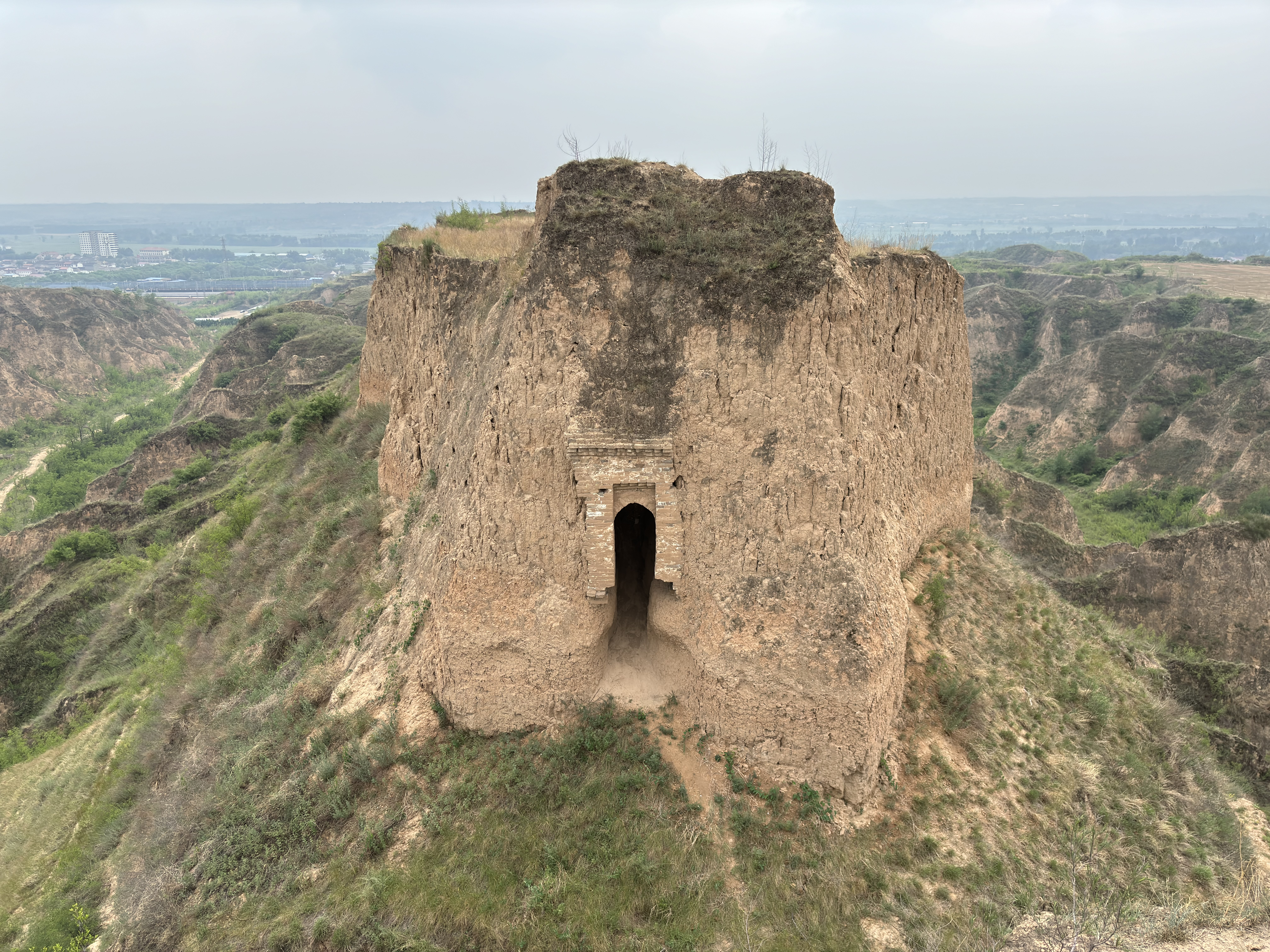
A Fortress Located at Hejin City
