= Locust tree of Hongtong =

Historical tree in Shanxi, China

Coordinates: 36.2706°N 111.671°E

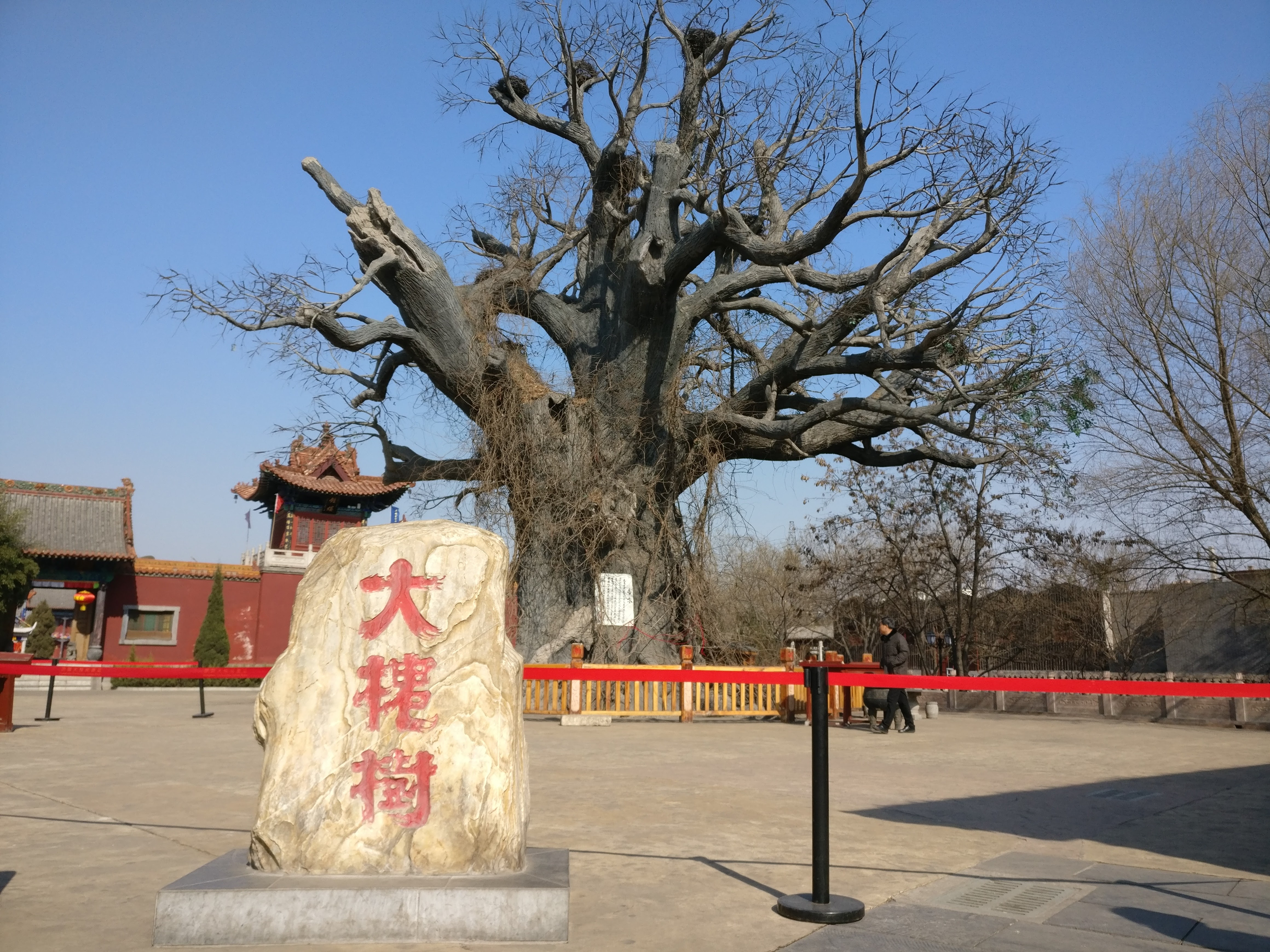

The Locust Tree of Hongtong is an old Styphnolobium japonicum-tree and important historical site and tourist attraction in Hongtong County, Shanxi in China.

== History ==
From about 1373 to 1417, there was a concerted effort from the ruling Ming dynasty government to resettle the North China Plains, which had been negatively affected by conflict and natural disasters shortly before the Ming took power. Immigrants from Shanxi were often concentrated near the tree, which was a settlement center. While en route to their new homes in the North China Plains, many migrants gathered at the tree in Hongtong before moving on to new areas for settlement, with some remaining nearby.

== Tourist attraction ==
The tree and surrounding complex retains cultural significance, being visited by about 200,000 tourists each year and being labelled as one of the AAAAA Tourist Attractions of China. The tree is a notable site for Chinese ancestor veneration, with tourists paying homage to their ancestors. The site also hosts large events for the annual Qingming Festival.
