= G5516 Sonid Right Banner–Zhangjiakou Expressway =

Road in China

Sonid Right Banner–Zhangjiakou Expressway
- 苏尼特右旗－张家口高速公路
- Sozhang Expressway 苏张高速公路

Route information
- Auxiliary route of G55

Major junctions
- West end: G55 in Sonid Right Banner, Xilingol League, Inner Mongolia
- East end: G95 in Guyuan County, Zhangjiakou, Hebei

Location
- Country: China

Highway system
- National Trunk Highway System; Primary; Auxiliary; National Highways; Transport in China
← G5515	→ G5517

The G5516 Sonid Right Banner–Zhangjiakou Expressway (Chinese: 苏尼特右旗—张家口高速公路), also referred to as the Sozhang Expressway (Chinese: 苏张高速公路), is an expressway in China that connects Sonid Right Banner, Inner Mongolia to Zhangjiakou, Hebei.

== Route ==
The expressway starts in the southern part of Sonid Right Banner, Xilingol League, and passes through Xianghuang Banner, Huade County and Kangbao County before terminating in Guyuan County, Zhangjiakou.
