= G0511 Deyang–Dujiangyan Expressway =

Expressway in Sichuan, China

Deyang–Dujiangyan Expressway
- 德阳－都江堰高速公路
- Dedu Expressway 德都高速

Route information
- Length: 89.6 km (55.7 mi)
- Existed: 21 December 2014–present

Location
- Country: China
- Province: Sichuan

Highway system
- National Trunk Highway System; Primary; Auxiliary; National Highways; Transport in China
← G5	→ G0512

The G0511 Deyang–Dujiangyan Expressway (Chinese: 德都高速公路, 德都高速) is a part of Chengdu Economic Zone Ring Expressway, starting from Deyang City in Sichuan Province, passing through Shifang, Pengzhou, only in Dujiangyan City, Sichuan Province.
