= Triplophysa heyangensis =

Scientific classification
- Kingdom: Animalia
- Phylum: Chordata
- Class: Actinopterygii
- Division: Teleostei
- Order: Cypriniformes
- Family: Nemacheilidae
- Genus: Triplophysa
- Species: T. heyangensis

Binomial name
- Triplophysa heyangensis S. Q. Zhu, 1992

Species of fish

Triplophysa heyangensis is a species of stone loach endemic to China. Its type locality is a stream draining to the Yellow River near Hanshutau village, Heyang County, Shaanxi.
