= Hongxing, Ya'an =

Hongxing
- Town

Chinese transcription(s)
  - Chinese: 红星镇
- Location in Sichuan
- Coordinates: 30°7′13″N 103°9′32″E
- Country: China
- Province: Sichuan
- Prefecture: Ya'an
- District: Mingshan

Area
  - Total: 37 km^{2} (14 sq mi)
- Elevation: 679 m (2,228 ft)

Population (2004)
  - Total: 11,514
- Time zone: UTC+8 (China Standard Time)

Hongxing or Hongxingzhen (Chinese: 红星镇) is a town situated in the Mingshan County of Sichuan, China. It is under the jurisdiction of Ya'an prefecture-level city. It is located along China National Highway 318 (Route G5), about 29 kilometres (18 mi) by road southwest of the town of Pujian and 37.9 kilometres (23.5 mi) by road northeast of Ya'an. It has an area of 37 kilometres (23 mi) and as of 2004 had a population of 11,514 people. and 12,375.1 acres of arable land. With an average elevation of 679 metres, it has an average temperature of 15.5 degrees Celsius and average annual rainfall of 1300 mm. Principal activities include corn, wheat, tea, and melon production, pig farming and fishing.

== Administrative divisions ==
The township-level division contains the following villages:

- Taiping Village (太坪村)
- Yuba Village (余坝村)
- Luowan Village (罗湾村)
- Baiqiang Village (白墙村)
- Shangma Village (上马村)
- Gongdian Village (龚店村)
- Tianwang Village (天王村)
- Huaguang Village (华光村)
