= Beishifo Township =

Beishifo Township 北石佛乡
- Rural Township
- Běishífó Xiāng
- Location in Hebei Location in China
- Coordinates: 39°20′26″N 114°37′43″E
- Country: People's Republic of China
- Province: Hebei
- Prefecture-level city: Baoding
- County: Laiyuan

Area
  - Total: 134.3 km^{2} (51.9 sq mi)

Population (2010)
  - Total: 17,310
  - Density: 128.9/km^{2} (334/sq mi)
- Time zone: UTC+8 (China Standard)

Beishifo Township (Chinese: 北石佛乡; pinyin: Běishífó Xiāng) is a rural township located in Laiyuan County, Baoding, Hebei, China. According to the 2010 census, Beishifo Township had a population of 17,310, including 9,128 males and 8,182 females. The population was distributed as follows: 3,446 people aged under 14, 12,398 people aged between 15 and 64, and 1,466 people aged over 65.

== See also ==
- List of township-level divisions of Hebei
