= Wan'an, Deyang =

Wan'an 万安镇
- Town
- Location in Sichuan
- Coordinates: 31°19′27″N 104°29′53″E
- Country: People's Republic of China
- Province: Sichuan
- Prefecture-level city: Deyang
- District: Luojiang District
- Time zone: UTC+8 (China Standard)

Wan'an (simplified Chinese: 万安; traditional Chinese: 萬安; pinyin: Wàn'ān) is a town under the administration of Luojiang District, Deyang, Sichuan, China. As of 2018, it has 14 residential communities and 4 villages under its administration.
