= G95 Capital Area Loop Expressway =

Beltway around Beijing, China

Capital Area Loop Expressway
- 首都地区环线高速公路
- Capital Loop Expressway 首都环线高速

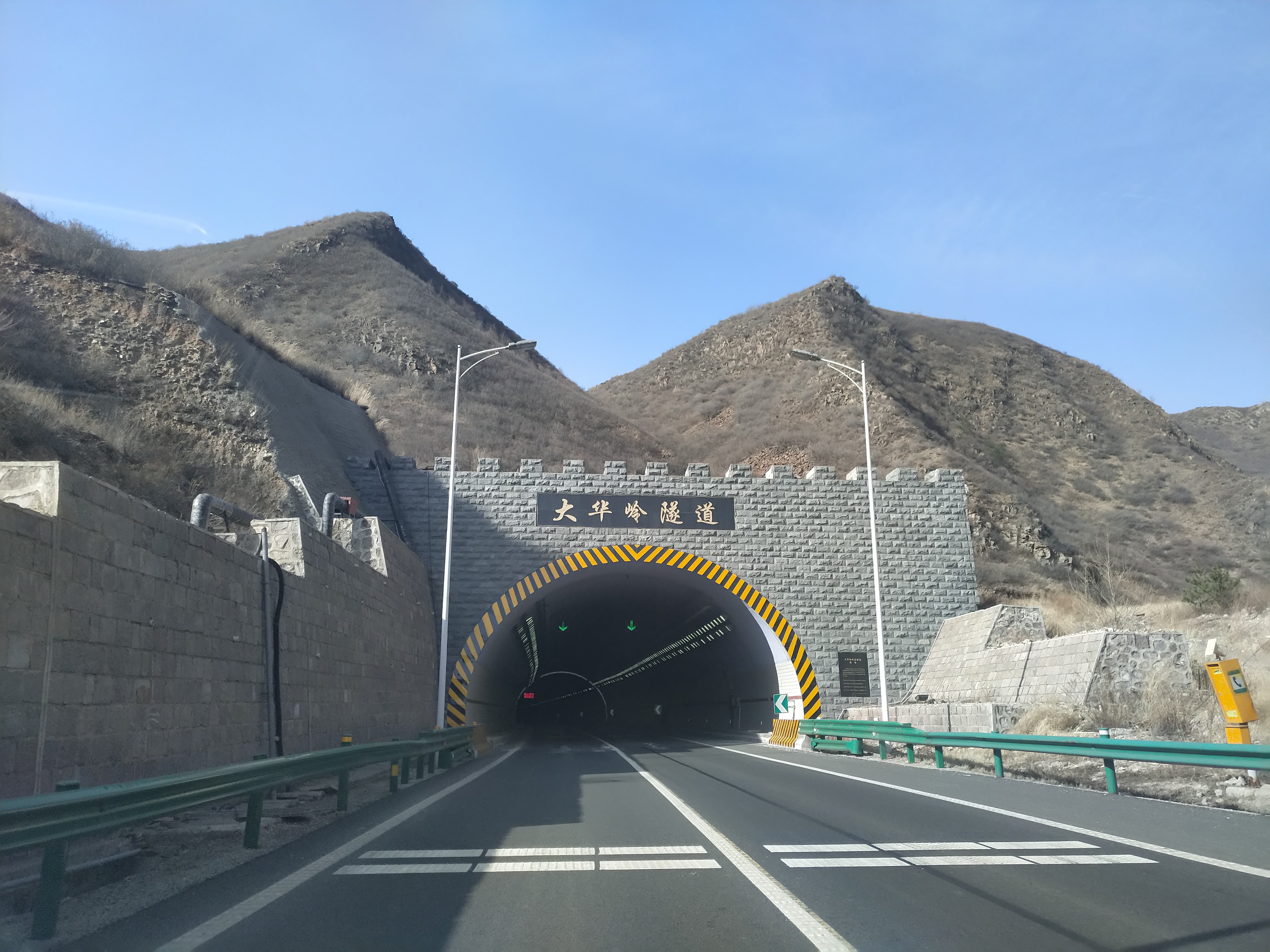
- Dahualing Tunnel in April 2020

Route information
- Length: 940 km (580 mi) Length when complete.

Major junctions
- Orbital around Beijing

Location
- Country: China

Highway system
- National Trunk Highway System; Primary; Auxiliary; National Highways; Transport in China
| ← G9411 | → G9511 |

The Capital Area Loop Expressway (simplified Chinese: 首都地区环线高速公路; traditional Chinese: 首都地區環線高速公路) is an orbital expressway encircling the city of Beijing. It is designated G95. The road was completed in December 2016. Colloquially, the road is also referred to as Beijing's 7th ring road, though only 38 km (24 mi) of the expressway runs through Beijing, compared to 38 km (24 mi) through Tianjin and 924 km (574 mi) through Hebei.

== History ==
The road was officially open to public vehicle traffic on 20 Aug 2018. In 2022, this expressway was officially rerouted so that it does not enter Beijing's municipality.

== Route ==
This expressway encircles the various counties and cities that surround the city centre of Beijing, including Zhangjiakou, Langfang, and Chengde in Hebei Province, and Daxing District, Tongzhou District and Pinggu District in Beijing.

| Location | km | mi | Exit | Name | Destinations | Notes |
G95 Chengde urban area and G25 overlap
| Shuangluan District, Chengde | 0 | 0 | | Chengde West | G45 (Daguang Expressway) | End of G45 concurrency |
| Shuangluan District, Chengde | 3 | 1.9 | | Luanhe | Hebei S354 | |
| Luanping County, Chengde | 7 | 4.3 | | G2502 (Chengde Ring Expressway) | | |
| Luanping County, Chengde | 12 | 7.5 | | G25 (Changshen Expressway) | | Start of G25 concurrency |
| Chengde County, Chengde | 27 | 17 | | Chengde County An Jiang | | |
| Chengde County, Chengde | 33 | 21 | Liu Zhangzi Service Area | | | |
| Xinglong County, Chengde | 44 | 27 | | Lijiaying | Hebei S354 (Beiling Line) | |
| Xinglong County, Chengde | 51 | 32 | | G25 (Changshen Expressway) | | End of G25 concurrency |
| Xinglong County, Chengde | Chengping Expressway section under construction, expected to open in 2024 | | | | | |
| Pinggu District, Beijing | 61 | 38 | | Dongxinzhuang | Beijing S358 (Beiling Line) | |
| Pinggu District, Beijing | 65 | 40 | | Zhongtan | | |
| Pinggu District, Beijing | 79 | 49 | Yan Zhao Service Area | | | |
| Pinggu District, Beijing | 81 | 50 | | Baita | | |
| Pinggu District, Beijing | 93 | 58 | | Yutian City West | | |
| Pinggu District, Beijing | 107 | 66 | | Zunhua | Beijing S3201 (Jingping Expressway) | Start of S3201 concurrency |
| Pinggu District, Beijing | 120 | 75 | | Nantaiwu (Xiagezhuang) | Northern freight corridor | |
| Pinggu District, Beijing | 126 | 78 | | Yangzhuang Rice Field | Yangdao Road | No entrance coming from Chengde and no exit towards Beijing |
| Pinggu District, Beijing | 130 | 81 | | Sanhe | Beijing S206 (Pingsanlu) | |
| Pinggu District, Beijing | 138 | 86 | | Zhaozhuanghu Daxingzhuang | Beijing S222 (Cui Xinglu) | |
| Pinggu District, Beijing | 144 | 89 | | Beijing S3201 (Jingping Expressway)/ Beijing S80 (Mizhuo Expressway) | | End of S3201 concurrency |
| Pinggu District, Beijing | Beijing S80 Mizhuo Expressway section | | | | | |
| Sanhe, Langfang | 149 | 93 | | G0121 (Jingqin Expressway) | | |
| Sanhe, Langfang | 153 | 95 | | Sanhedong | G102 | |
| Sanhe, Langfang | 161 | 100 | | Sanhenan | Hebei S274 (Pingxiang Line) | |
| Dachang, Langfang | 168 | 104 | | Dachangdong | X752 (Hou Tan Line) | |
| Dachang, Langfang | 171 | 106 | Dacheng Service Area | | | |
| Xianghe County, Langfang | 177 | 110 | | Xianghexi | Hebei S271 (Daxiang Line) | |
| Tongzhou District, Beijing | 183 | 114 | | (Beijing) (Shenyang) | G1 (Jingha Expressway) | Ramp to G1 closed due to the COVID-19 pandemic |
| Tongzhou District, Beijing | 186 | 116 | Xiji Parking Area | | | |
| Tongzhou District, Beijing | 192 | 119 | | Luxian East (Tongzhou City) (Daxing) | G103 (Jingbin Road) | Exit closed due to the COVID-19 pandemic |
| Tongzhou District, Beijing | 197 | 122 | | Yongledianbei | Beijing S223 (Huoxiao Road) | Exit closed due to the COVID-19 pandemic |
| Tongzhou District, Beijing | 203 | 126 | | Beijing S15 / Beijing S3301 (Jingjin Expressway) | | Ramp to S15 closed due to the COVID-19 pandemic |
| Tongzhou District, Beijing | 206 | 128 | | Yujiawuan | Dade Road | Exit closed due to the COVID-19 pandemic |
| Daxing District, Beijing | 209 | 130 | | Caiyudong | G2 (Jingsha Expressway) | Exit closed due to the COVID-19 pandemic |
| Daxing District, Beijing | 214 | 133 | | Caiyu West (Langfang) | G104 (Jinglan Road) | Exit closed due to the COVID-19 pandemic |
| Daxing District, Beijing | 216 | 134 | | Caiyu South Main Line Station | | |
| Guangyang District, Langfang | 220 | 140 | | Wanzhuang Main Line Station | | |
| Guangyang District, Langfang | 221 | 137 | Wanzhuang Parking Area | | | |
| Guangyang District, Langfang | 223 | 139 | | Wanzhuang (Langfang Daxing) | Langwan Road | |
| Guangyang District, Langfang | 226 | 140 | | Qijiaying | Beijing S3300 (Daxing Airport North Line Expressway) | |
| Guangyang District, Langfang | 231 | 144 | | Jiuzhou | G3 (Jingtai Expressway) | |
| Guangyang District, Langfang | 235 | 146 | | Langfang West | Hebei S271 | |
| Guangyang District, Langfang | Hebei S24 Langzhuo Expressway section | | | | | |
| Gu'an County, Langfang | Langfang Service Area | | | | | |
| Gu'an County, Langfang | 249 | 155 | | Gu'an East | Hebei S371 | |
| Gu'an County, Langfang | 258 | 160 | | Gu'annan (Bazhou) | G106 | |
| Gu'an County, Langfang | 262 | 163 | | Gongzhuhaozhai Interchange | G45 (Daguang Expressway) | |
| Gu'an County, Langfang | 268 | 167 | Gu'an Service Area | | | |
| Gu'an County, Langfang | 272 | 169 | | Donghaiwan | | |
| Zhuozhou, Baoding | 282 | 175 | | Senior Officials Village (Doucun) | G230 (Jingbai Road) | |
| Zhuozhou, Baoding | 288 | 179 | | Linjiatun Interchange | G4 (Jinggang'ao Expressway) | |
| Zhuozhou, Baoding | 294 | 183 | | Zhuozhou South (Gaomeishangdian) | G107 | |
| Zhuozhou, Baoding | 297 | 185 | | Huajiatun (Songlinshangdian) | G112 | |
| Zhuozhou, Baoding | 300 | 190 | Zhuozhou South Service Area | | | |
| Zhuozhou, Baoding | Zhangzhou Expressway section | | | | | |
| Zhuozhou, Baoding | 305 | 190 | | Laishui East Interchange | G9511 (Lailai Expressway) | |
| Laishui County, Baoding | 312 | 194 | | Laishuibei | Laizhuo Highway | |
| Laishui County, Baoding | 319 | 198 | | Laishuibei | G5 (Jingkun Expressway) | |
| Laishui County, Baoding | 322 | 200 | Laishui Service Area | | | |
| Laishui County, Baoding | 343 | 213 | | Yesanpo (Duya) | | |
| Laishui County, Baoding | 357 | 222 | Yesanpo Service Area, Bailixia Entrance and Exit | | | |
| Laishui County, Baoding | 366 | 227 | | Zaibaicao (Jiulong) | Hebei S236 / Hebei S241 | |
| Zhuolu County, Zhangjiakou | Chahe Parking Area | | | | | |
| Zhuolu County, Zhangjiakou | 379 | 235 | | Hedong | Hebei S241 / Hebei S248 | |
| Zhuolu County, Zhangjiakou | 385 | 239 | | Hedong | G109 / Hebei S3701 (Jingwei Expressway) | Start of S3701 concurrency |
| Zhuolu County, Zhangjiakou | 393 | 244 | | Kongjian (Mentougou) | G109 / Hebei S241 | |
| Zhuolu County, Zhangjiakou | Baojiakou Service Area | | | | | |
| Zhuolu County, Zhangjiakou | 410 | 250 | | Baojiakou | Hebei S3701 (Jingwei Expressway) | End of S3701 concurrency |
| Zhuolu County, Zhangjiakou | 413 | 257 | | Yellow Emperor City (Taiping Fort) | G109 | |
| Zhuolu County, Zhangjiakou | 436 | 271 | Zhuolu Service Area | | | |
| Zhuolu County, Zhangjiakou | 446 | 277 | | Zhuolu | Hebei S342 | |
| Zhuolu County, Zhangjiakou | G7 Jingxin Expressway overlap | | | | | |
| Zhuolu County, Zhangjiakou | 449 | 279 | | Shanjiabao | G7 (Jingxin Expressway) | Start of G7 concurrency |
| Zhuolu County, Zhangjiakou | 453 | 281 | | Zhuolu North | Hebei S342 | |
| Xiahuayuan District, Zhangjiakou | 465 | 289 | | Xiayuan West (Xuanhua) (Banpo Street) | G110 | |
| Xuanhua District, Zhangjiakou | 474 | 295 | | Dongsha He | Hebei S32 (Xuanda Expressway) | |
| Xuanhua District, Zhangjiakou | 485 | 301 | Xuanhua South Service Area | | | |
| Xuanhua District, Zhangjiakou | 493 | 306 | | Kelaiwan West | G7 (Jingxin Expressway) / Hebei S010 (Zhangjiakou Section of Zhangsha Expressway) | End of G7 concurrency |
| Xuanhua District, Zhangjiakou | Hebei S010 Zhangjiakou Section of Zhangsha Expressway overlap | | | | | |
| Xuanhua District, Zhangjiakou | 499 | 310 | | Jiaoni Bay (Xuanhua West) | | |
| Xuanhua District, Zhangjiakou | 500 | 310 | | Yangshe | G6 (Jingla Expressway) | Start of G6 concurrency |
| Xuanhua District, Zhangjiakou | 511 | 318 | | Xuanhua North | | |
| Xuanhua District, Zhangjiakou | G6 Jingla Expressway section | | | | | |
| Xuanhua District, Zhangjiakou | 519 | 322 | | Xuanhua East | G95 (Capital Area Loop Expressway) | End of G6 concurrency |
| Xuanhua District, Zhangjiakou | Zhangcheng Expressway section | | | | | |
| Qiaodong District, Zhangjiakou | 526 | 327 | Zhangjiakou Service Area | | | |
| Qiaodong District, Zhangjiakou | 529 | 329 | | Weisan Road (south of Zhangjiakou) | | |
| Qiaodong District, Zhangjiakou | 536 | 333 | | Wuyi Road (Zhangjiakou) | | |
| Chongli District, Zhangjiakou | 553 | 344 | | Putu Wan | Zhanggu Line | |
| Chongli District, Zhangjiakou | 572 | 355 | Chongli Service Area | | | |
| Chongli District, Zhangjiakou | 575 | 357 | | Chongli South | Hebei S242 | |
| Chongli District, Zhangjiakou | 581 | 361 | | Chongli North | Hebei S242 | |
| Chongli District, Zhangjiakou | 594 | 369 | | Nanshanyaocun | Hebei S345 | |
| Zhangbei County, Zhangjiakou | 620 | 390 | | Huapi Ridge (Caoyuantian Road) | | |
| Guyuan County, Zhangjiakou | 633 | 393 | | Hehuatan | | |
| Guyuan County, Zhangjiakou | 642 | 399 | | Xixinyang | Hebei S345 | |
| Guyuan County, Zhangjiakou | 659 | 409 | | Dongtan Interchange | G5516 (Suzhang Expressway) | |
| Guyuan County, Zhangjiakou | 663 | 412 | Guyuan Parking Area | | | |
| Guyuan County, Zhangjiakou | 642 | 399 | | Guyuan | Hebei S241 | |
| Fengning Manchu Autonomous County, Chengde | 684 | 425 | Dahaitan Parking Area | | | |
| Fengning Manchu Autonomous County, Chengde | 690 | 430 | | Dahaitan (Duron) | | |
| Fengning Manchu Autonomous County, Chengde | 703 | 437 | Qiansongba Service Area | | | |
| Fengning Manchu Autonomous County, Chengde | 733 | 455 | Chuntian Parking Area | | | |
| Fengning Manchu Autonomous County, Chengde | 752 | 467 | Fengning Service Area | | | |
| Fengning Manchu Autonomous County, Chengde | 756 | 470 | | Fengning | G111 | |
| Fengning Manchu Autonomous County, Chengde | 771 | 479 | | Nanguan | G112 | |
| Fengning Manchu Autonomous County, Chengde | 771 | 479 | | Hebei S223 | | |
| Fengning Manchu Autonomous County, Chengde | 785 | 488 | Fengshan Service Area | | | |
| Fengning Manchu Autonomous County, Chengde | 787 | 489 | | Fengshan (Luanping) | Hebei S352 | |
| Luanping County, Chengde | 793 | 493 | Longhua Service Area | | | |
| Luanping County, Chengde | 798 | 496 | | Longhua (Weichang) | Hebei S214 | |
| Luanping County, Chengde | 802 | 498 | | Hongqizhen (Luanping) | Hebei S214 | |
| Shuangluan District, Chengde | 814 | 506 | | Shuangluan North (Chengde Shuangluan) | Hebei S256 | |
| Shuangluan District, Chengde | G45 Daguang Expressway overlap | | | | | |
| Shuangluan District, Chengde | 897 | 557 | | Danta | G45 (Daguang Expressway) | Start of G45 concurrency |
| Shuangluan District, Chengde | 903 | 561 | | Weisitefeierde (Qianyingdi) | | |
| Shuangluan District, Chengde | 908 | 564 | | Chengde West | G45 (Daguang Expressway) | End of G45 concurrency |
Closed/former; Concurrency terminus; HOV only; Incomplete access; Tolled; Route transition; Unopened
