= China National Highway 108 =

Road in China

National Highway 108
- 108国道

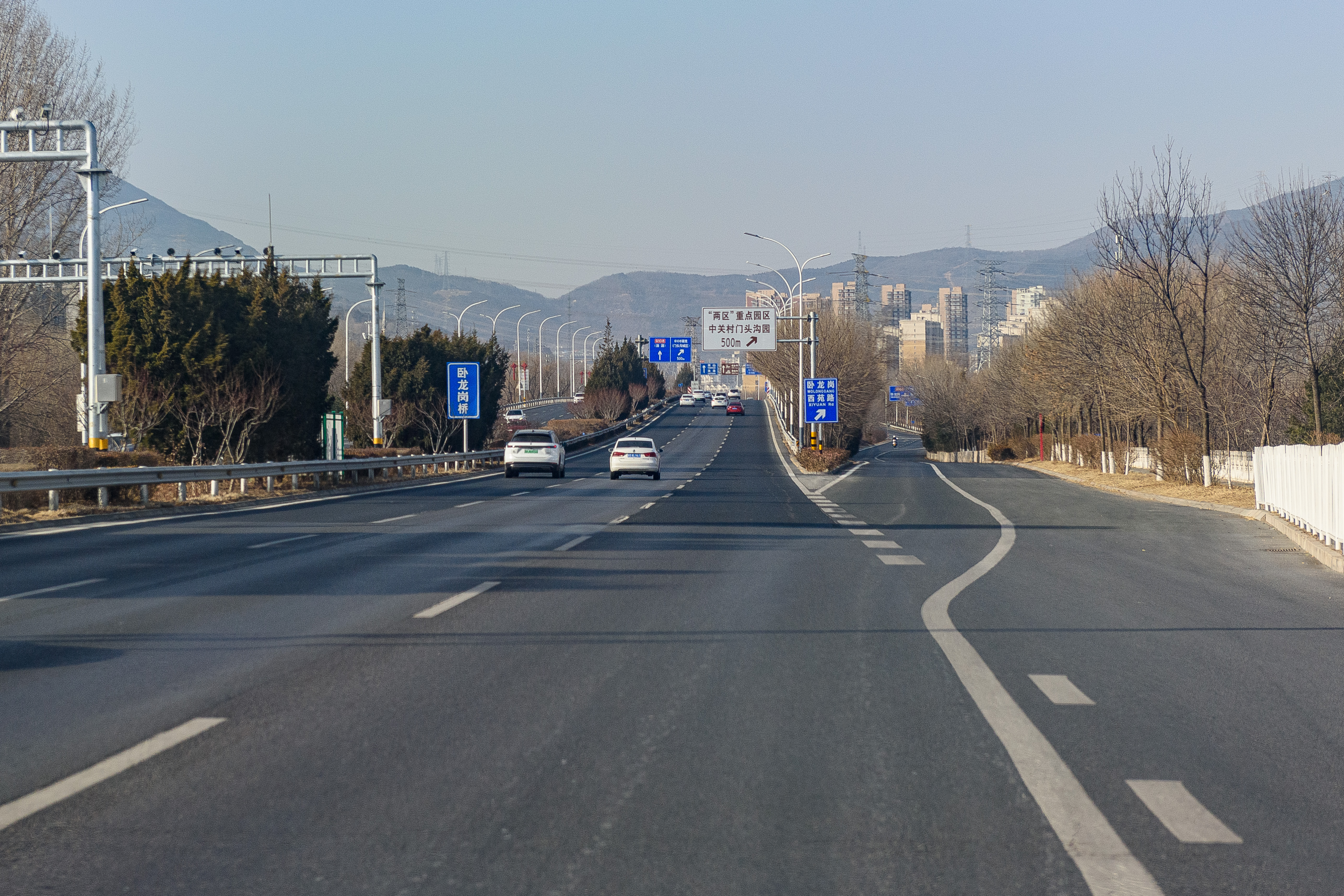
- G108 Wolonggang Bridge in Mentougou District, Beijing

Route information
- Length: 3,331 km (2,070 mi)

Major junctions
- From: Beijing
- To: Kunming

Location
- Country: China

Highway system
- National Trunk Highway System; Primary; Auxiliary
← G107	→ G109

China National Highway 108 (G108) is a National Highway which connects Beijing through Chengdu to Kunming. In Beijing it is known as Jingyuan Road.

It leaves Beijing at Fuxingmen and heads for Yamenkou, before heading into hillier terrain and leaving Beijing altogether. It runs for approximately 3331 km. Both Tanzhe Temple and Jietai Temple are located nearby.

The section to the 4th Ring Road (Beijing) is under construction as a city express road, and the same applies for the stretch to the 6th Ring Road.

== Route and distance ==
Route and distance

City	Distance (km)
Beijing, Beijing	0
Laiyuan County, Hebei	253
Fanshi, Shanxi	420
Dai County, Shanxi	451
Yuanping, Shanxi	496
Xinzhou, Shanxi	529
Yangqu, Shanxi	572
Taiyuan, Shanxi	593
Jinzhong, Shanxi	620
Taigu, Shanxi	656
Qi County, Shanxi	678
Pingyao, Shanxi	695
Jiexiu, Shanxi	720
Lingshi, Shanxi	747
Huozhou, Shanxi	785
Linfen, Shanxi	848
Xiangfen, Shanxi	873
Quwo, Shanxi	907
Houma, Shanxi	917
Jishan, Shanxi	953
Hejin, Shanxi	980
Hancheng, Shaanxi	1025
Heyang County, Shaanxi	1076
Dali County, Shaanxi	1140
Weinan, Shaanxi	1198
Xi'an, Shaanxi	1253
Zhouzhi, Shaanxi	1321
Yang County, Shaanxi	1557
Chenggu, Shaanxi	1581
Hanzhong, Shaanxi	1612
Mian County, Shaanxi	1656
Zitong, Sichuan	1995
Mianyang, Sichuan	2052
Luojiang, Sichuan	2089
Deyang, Sichuan	2116
Guanghan, Sichuan	2135
Xindu, Sichuan	2157
Chengdu, Sichuan	2176
Shuangliu, Sichuan	2190
Xinjin, Sichuan	2212
Qionglai, Sichuan	2249
Mingshan, Sichuan	2304
Ya'an, Sichuan	2324
Yingjing, Sichuan	2369
Hanyuan, Sichuan	2483
Shimian, Sichuan	2535
Mianning, Sichuan	2643
Xichang, Sichuan	2724
Huili, Sichuan	2909
Yongren, Yunnan	3068
Yuanmou, Yunnan	3129
Wuding, Yunnan	3230
Luquan, Yunnan	3240
Fumin, Yunnan	3293
Kunming, Yunnan	3331

== See also ==
- China National Highways
