= G5517 Changde–Changsha Expressway =

Road in China

Changde–Changsha Expressway
- 常德－长沙高速公路
- Changchang North Route Expressway 长常北线高速公路

Route information
- Auxiliary route of G55
- Length: 144.24 km (89.63 mi)

Major junctions
- West end: G55 in Wuling District, Changde, Hunan
- East end: G0401 in Wangcheng District, Changsha, Hunan

Location
- Country: China

Highway system
- National Trunk Highway System; Primary; Auxiliary; National Highways; Transport in China
← G5516	→ G5518

The G5517 Changde–Changsha Expressway (Chinese: 常德—长沙高速公路), also referred to as the Changchang North Route Expressway (Chinese: 长常北线高速公路), is an expressway in Hunan, China that connects Changde to Changsha via Yiyang. The expressway runs parallel to the G5513 Changsha–Zhangjiajie Expressway.
