= Longmen Township, Hebei =

Longmen Township 龙门乡
- Township
- Location in Hebei
- Coordinates: 39°35′29″N 115°13′45″E
- Country: People's Republic of China
- Province: Hebei
- Prefecture-level city: Baoding
- County: Laishui
- Village-level divisions: 20 villages
- Elevation: 408 m (1,339 ft)
- Time zone: UTC+8 (China Standard)
- Area code: 0312

Longmen Township (simplified Chinese: 龙门乡; traditional Chinese: 龍門鄉; pinyin: Lóngmén Xiāng; lit. 'dragon door') is a township of Laishui County in the foothills of the Taihang Mountains of western Hebei province, China, located about 46 kilometres (29 mi) northwest of the county seat. As of 2011, it has 20 villages under its administration.
