= Laiyuan County =

Laiyuan County 涞源县
- County
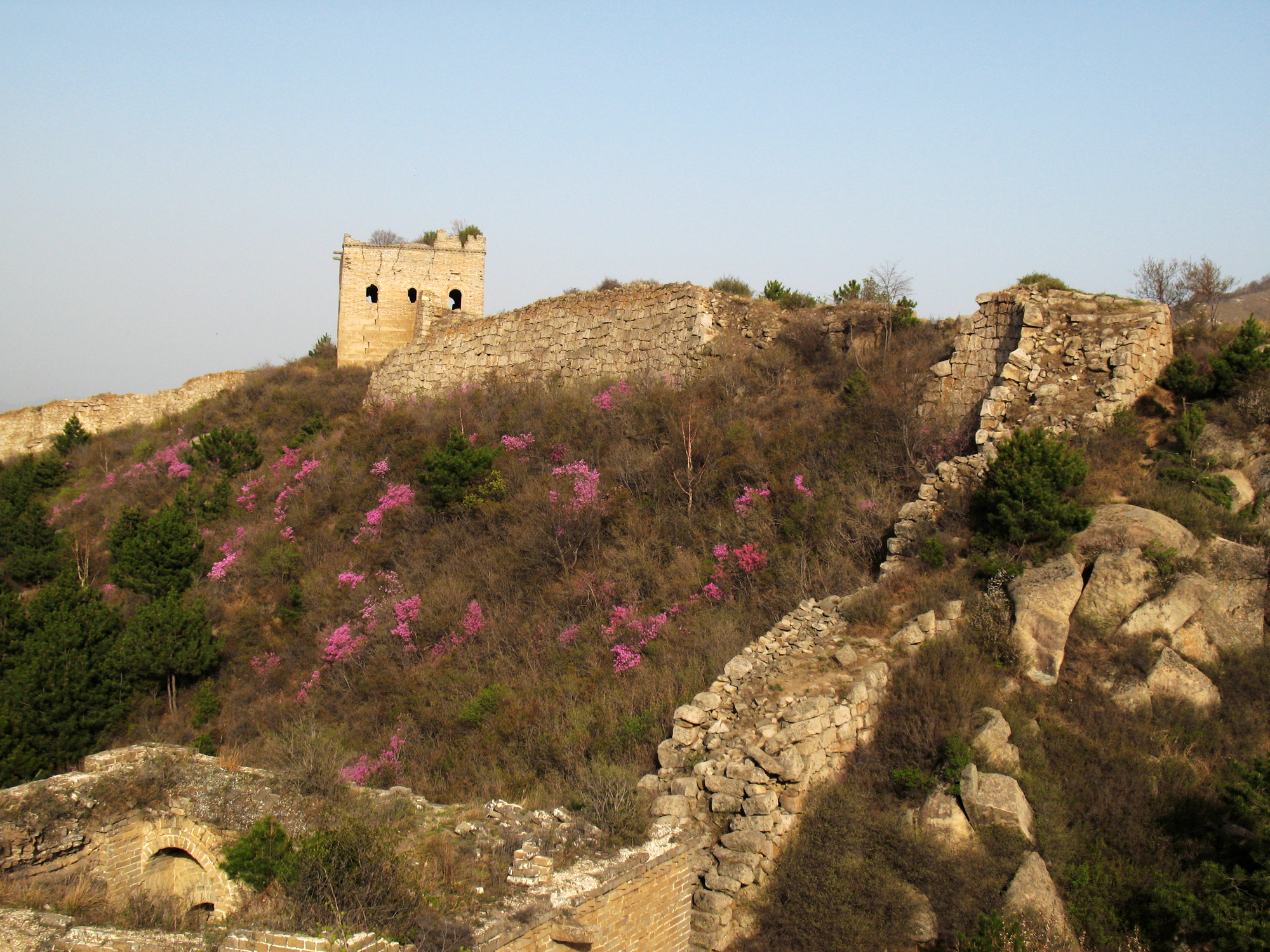
- Baishishan (白石山) Section of the Great Wall

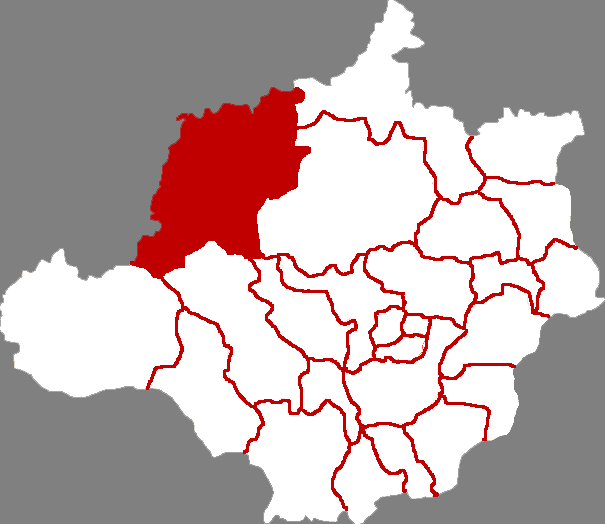
- Laiyuan in Baoding

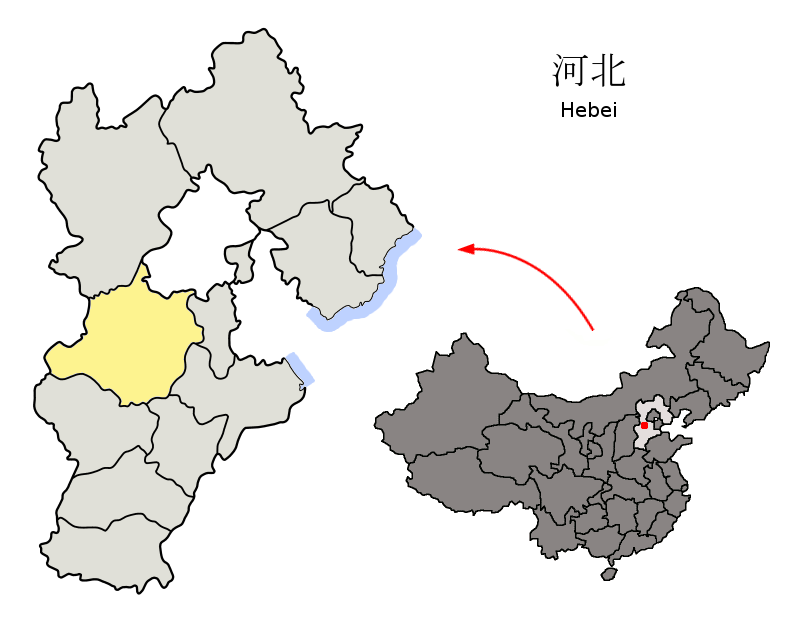
- Baoding in Hebei
- Coordinates: 39°21′36″N 114°41′38″E
- Country: People's Republic of China
- Province: Hebei
- Prefecture-level city: Baoding
- County seat: Laiyuan Town (涞源镇)

Area
  - Total: 2,430 km^{2} (940 sq mi)
- Elevation: 859 m (2,818 ft)

Population (2020)
  - Total: 248,890
  - Density: 102/km^{2} (265/sq mi)
- Time zone: UTC+8 (China Standard)
- Postal code: 074300

Laiyuan County (simplified Chinese: 涞源县; traditional Chinese: 淶源縣; pinyin: Láiyuán Xiàn) is a county in western Hebei province, China, bordering Shanxi province to the west. It is under the jurisdiction of the prefecture-level city of Baoding, and, as of 2020, it had a population of 248,890 residing in an area of 2,430 km^{2} (940 sq mi).

== Administrative divisions ==
There are 7 towns and 10 townships under the county's administration.

Towns:

- Laiyuan (涞源镇)
- Yinfang (银坊镇)
- Zoumayi (走马驿镇)
- Shuibao (水堡镇)
- Wang'an (王安镇)
- Yangjiazhuang (杨家庄镇)
- Baishishan (白石山镇)

Townships:

- Nandun Township (南屯乡)
- Nanmazhuang Township (南马庄乡)
- Beishifo Township (北石佛乡)
- Jinjiajing Township (金家井乡)
- Liujiazhuang Township (留家庄乡)
- Shangzhuang Township (上庄乡)
- Dongtuanbao Township (东团堡乡)
- Tayayi Township (塔崖驿乡)
- Wulonggou Township (乌龙沟乡)
- Yanmeidong Township (烟煤洞乡)

== Climate ==
Climate data for Laiyuan, elevation 884 m (2,900 ft), (1991–2020 normals, extremes 1981–2010)
Month	Jan	Feb	Mar	Apr	May	Jun	Jul	Aug	Sep	Oct	Nov	Dec	Year
Record high °C (°F)	15.0 (59.0)	21.0 (69.8)	27.8 (82.0)	34.9 (94.8)	36.6 (97.9)	38.0 (100.4)	39.8 (103.6)	35.1 (95.2)	34.8 (94.6)	27.7 (81.9)	23.6 (74.5)	17.6 (63.7)	39.8 (103.6)
Mean daily maximum °C (°F)	0.8 (33.4)	4.2 (39.6)	10.5 (50.9)	18.2 (64.8)	24.0 (75.2)	27.4 (81.3)	28.2 (82.8)	26.9 (80.4)	22.8 (73.0)	16.7 (62.1)	8.6 (47.5)	1.9 (35.4)	15.9 (60.5)
Daily mean °C (°F)	−7.6 (18.3)	−4.1 (24.6)	2.6 (36.7)	10.3 (50.5)	16.6 (61.9)	20.6 (69.1)	22.3 (72.1)	20.7 (69.3)	15.4 (59.7)	8.7 (47.7)	0.7 (33.3)	−5.8 (21.6)	8.4 (47.1)
Mean daily minimum °C (°F)	−13.8 (7.2)	−10.7 (12.7)	−4.3 (24.3)	2.7 (36.9)	8.9 (48.0)	13.9 (57.0)	17.1 (62.8)	15.4 (59.7)	9.2 (48.6)	2.3 (36.1)	−5.1 (22.8)	−11.4 (11.5)	2.0 (35.6)
Record low °C (°F)	−24.7 (−12.5)	−26.9 (−16.4)	−18.5 (−1.3)	−10.5 (13.1)	−3.4 (25.9)	3.7 (38.7)	7.6 (45.7)	4.2 (39.6)	−2.8 (27.0)	−11.6 (11.1)	−21.2 (−6.2)	−25.3 (−13.5)	−26.9 (−16.4)
Average precipitation mm (inches)	2.0 (0.08)	4.4 (0.17)	8.9 (0.35)	20.0 (0.79)	39.2 (1.54)	85.4 (3.36)	135.7 (5.34)	107.9 (4.25)	65.1 (2.56)	25.8 (1.02)	9.6 (0.38)	2.5 (0.10)	506.5 (19.94)
Average precipitation days (≥ 0.1 mm)	1.8	2.7	3.9	5.4	8.5	12.6	14.5	13.3	9.8	6.0	3.1	1.7	83.3
Average snowy days	2.3	3.9	3.4	1.2	0	0	0	0	0	0.2	2.9	2.8	16.7
Average relative humidity (%)	45	43	42	43	47	60	74	77	72	61	53	47	55
Mean monthly sunshine hours	204.2	196.6	234.4	249.0	270.6	234.0	213.4	216.2	214.4	216.4	199.3	200.0	2,648.5
Percentage possible sunshine	67	64	63	62	61	53	47	52	58	63	67	69	61
Source: China Meteorological Administration

== Transportation ==
- China National Highway 108
- China National Highway 112
- China National Highway 207
- G18 Rongcheng–Wuhai Expressway
