= Xi'an International Trade & Logistics Park =

Industrial park in Xi'an, China

Xi'an International Trade & Logistics Park (XITLP; Chinese: 西安国际港务区) is an industrial park located in Xi'an, Shaanxi Province, China, serving as free trade zone dry port.

== History ==
The park was founded in 2008 to create a transport hub in the inland water areas surrounding Xi'an. The park's development was explicitly conceived to be a model of logistics-based urbanization. The park is approximately a 35-square-mile area in northeast Xi'an.

The park brings together a dry port and rail container center. The Longhai Railway is located in the Xi'an International Trade & Logistics Park. It is the busiest railway heading to China's Central plains.

== See also ==
- Rail transport in China
