= Hongtong County =

Hongtong County 洪洞县 Hungtung
- County
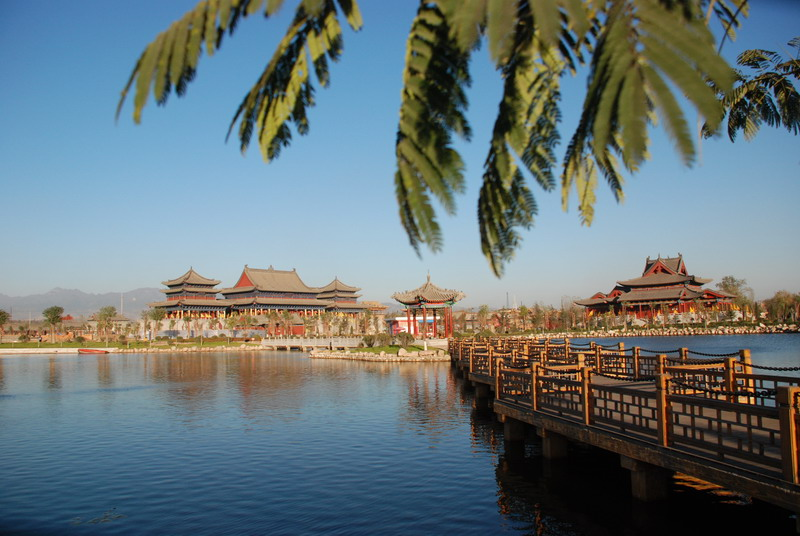
- Great Pagoda Tree Memorial

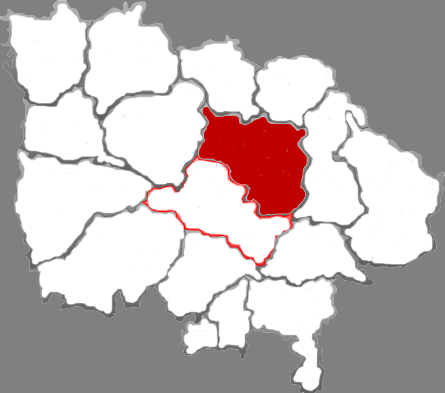
- Hongtong in Linfen

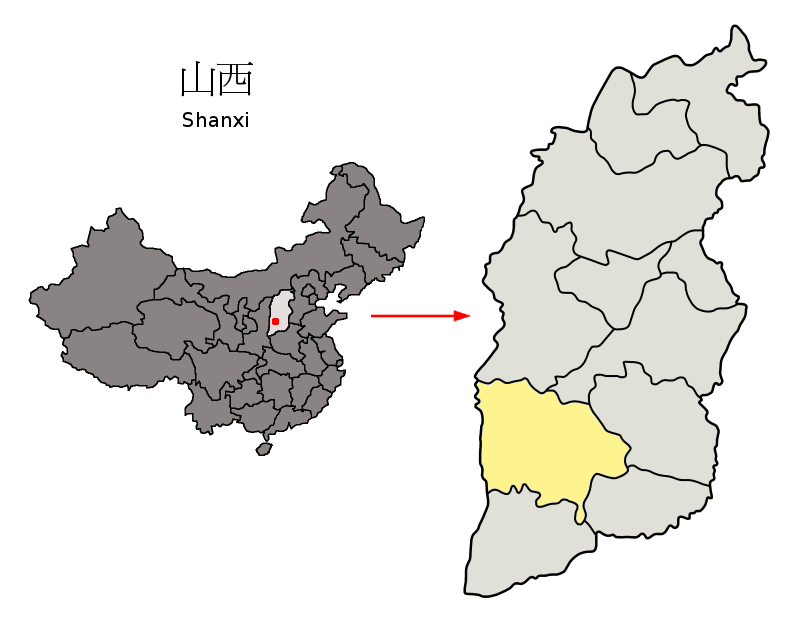
- Linfen in Shanxi
- Coordinates (Hongtong County government): 36°15′13″N 111°40′30″E
- Country: People's Republic of China
- Province: Shanxi
- Prefecture-level city: Linfen

Area
  - Total: 1,494 km^{2} (577 sq mi)

Population (2019)
  - Total: 766,579
  - Density: 513.1/km^{2} (1,329/sq mi)
- Time zone: UTC+8 (China Standard)
- Postal code: 041600
- Website: http://www.hongtong.gov.cn/

Hongtong County (simplified Chinese: 洪洞县; traditional Chinese: 洪洞縣; pinyin: Hóngtóng Xiàn) is a county in the southwest of Shanxi Province, China. It is under the administration of the prefecture-level city of Linfen. The county spans an area of 1,494 square kilometers, and has a population of approximately 766,579 as of 2019.

== History ==
During the reigns of the Hongwu Emperor through the Yongle Emperor, there was a concerted effort to resettle Chinese peasants from the Southern China to the North China Plains, which had been afflicted by conflict and natural disasters shortly before their reigns. While en route to their new homes in the North China Plains, many migrants gathered at the Great Pagoda Tree of Hongtong, and many even chose to settle in and around Pingyang Fu, which contained present-day Hongtong County.

== Administrative divisions ==
Hongtong County is divided into nine towns and seven townships. The county's seat of government is located in the town of Dahuaishu.

The county's nine towns are Dahuaishu, Ganting, Quting, Subao, Guangshengsi, Mingjiang, Zhaocheng, Wan'an, and Liujiayuan.

The county's seven townships are Yandi Township, Xingtangsi Township, Dicun Township, Xincun Township, Longma Township, Shantou Township, and Zuomu Township.

== Geography ==
Lying in the northern end of the Linfen Basin, Hongtong County has an average altitude of 430 meters, with its highest peak, Huoshan, reaching 2,347 meters in elevation. The Fen River runs north to south through the county.

=== Climate ===
On an annual basis, Hongtong County experiences an average temperature of 12.7 °C, 441.5 millimeters of precipitation, and 2079.1 hours of sunshine.

Climate data for Hongtong, elevation 463 m (1,519 ft), (1991–2020 normals, extremes 1981–2010)
Month	Jan	Feb	Mar	Apr	May	Jun	Jul	Aug	Sep	Oct	Nov	Dec	Year
Record high °C (°F)	15.4 (59.7)	21.8 (71.2)	29.0 (84.2)	35.4 (95.7)	37.0 (98.6)	41.6 (106.9)	40.5 (104.9)	38.6 (101.5)	38.5 (101.3)	31.5 (88.7)	25.6 (78.1)	15.5 (59.9)	41.6 (106.9)
Mean daily maximum °C (°F)	4.6 (40.3)	9.3 (48.7)	15.8 (60.4)	22.4 (72.3)	27.4 (81.3)	32.1 (89.8)	32.9 (91.2)	30.9 (87.6)	26.2 (79.2)	20.1 (68.2)	12.2 (54.0)	5.6 (42.1)	20.0 (67.9)
Daily mean °C (°F)	−2.2 (28.0)	2.1 (35.8)	8.5 (47.3)	15 (59)	20.1 (68.2)	24.9 (76.8)	26.7 (80.1)	24.9 (76.8)	19.7 (67.5)	13.1 (55.6)	5.5 (41.9)	−0.9 (30.4)	13.1 (55.6)
Mean daily minimum °C (°F)	−7.2 (19.0)	−3.1 (26.4)	2.6 (36.7)	8.5 (47.3)	13.5 (56.3)	18.6 (65.5)	21.8 (71.2)	20.3 (68.5)	14.9 (58.8)	8.1 (46.6)	0.6 (33.1)	−5.5 (22.1)	7.8 (46.0)
Record low °C (°F)	−17.4 (0.7)	−17.5 (0.5)	−11.5 (11.3)	−4.1 (24.6)	2.3 (36.1)	6.8 (44.2)	14.7 (58.5)	11.8 (53.2)	1.6 (34.9)	−5.4 (22.3)	−17.1 (1.2)	−18.9 (−2.0)	−18.9 (−2.0)
Average precipitation mm (inches)	4.1 (0.16)	5.2 (0.20)	10.1 (0.40)	28.3 (1.11)	37.2 (1.46)	51.7 (2.04)	106.5 (4.19)	82.2 (3.24)	62.4 (2.46)	35.4 (1.39)	15.8 (0.62)	2.7 (0.11)	441.6 (17.38)
Average precipitation days (≥ 0.1 mm)	2.2	3.0	3.7	5.4	6.7	8.2	10.5	9.4	8.7	6.4	4.2	2.1	70.5
Average snowy days	3.2	2.9	0.8	0.2	0	0	0	0	0	0	1.2	2.2	10.5
Average relative humidity (%)	54	52	49	53	56	56	67	72	72	69	64	57	60
Mean monthly sunshine hours	127.0	140.7	180.9	208.5	225.5	208.0	197.0	189.6	159.6	152.8	133.5	123.5	2,046.6
Percentage possible sunshine	41	45	49	53	52	48	45	46	43	44	44	41	46
Source: China Meteorological Administration

== Demographics ==
The county's population was 766,579 as of 2019, of which 45.7% of the population lived in urbanized areas, whereas the remaining 54.3% lived in rural areas.

== Economy ==
As of 2019, Hongtong County has a GDP of 15.15 billion Renminbi. Of this, the primary sector accounted for 6.6% of the economy, the secondary sector accounted for 45.8% of the economy, and the tertiary sector accounted for 47.6% of the economy. Retail sales in 2019 totaled 7.03 billion Renminbi. Residents of Hongtong County had a disposable income of 19,545 yuan per capita, which stood at 30,848 yuan for urban residents, and 13,025 yuan for rural residents, respectively.

Major agricultural products in the county include corn, wheat, millet, beans, yams, apples, red dates, and edible nuts.

Major industrial products in the county include coal, coal coke, benzene, refined methanol, cast iron, natural gas, cement, chemical fertilizers, and plastic products.

== Education ==
Hongtong County has 352 schools, which includes 145 kindergartens, 162 elementary schools, 33 junior high schools, 9 ordinary high schools, and 3 secondary vocational schools.

== Culture ==
The Locust Tree of Hongtong retains a high degree of cultural significance, which is visited by about 200,000 tourists each year. The Great Pagoda Tree has become a notable site in Chinese ancestor veneration, with tourists leaving messages at the site for their ancestors, and paying homage to them. The site also hosts large events for the annual Qingming Festival.

== Transportation ==
By the end of 2019, there were 417 registered taxis, as well as 16 bus lines operational in the county serviced by 223 buses.

Major expressways which run through Hongtong County include National Highway 108, National Highway 309, the G5 Beijing–Kunming Expressway, and the G22 Qingdao–Lanzhou Expressway.

The Datong–Xi'an passenger railway and Datong–Puzhou railway both run through Hongtong County.
