= Huilong, Qionglai =

Huilong 回龙镇
- Town
- Location in Sichuan
- Coordinates: 30°18′16″N 103°41′11″E
- Country: People's Republic of China
- Province: Sichuan
- Sub-provincial city: Chengdu
- County-level city: Qionglai
- Village-level divisions: 2 residential communities 7 villages
- Elevation: 466 m (1,529 ft)
- Time zone: UTC+8 (China Standard)
- Area code: 0028

Huilong (simplified Chinese: 回龙; traditional Chinese: 回龍; pinyin: Huílóng) is a town under the administration of Qionglai City in central Sichuan province, China, situated 24 kilometres (15 mi) southeast of downtown Qionglai and more than twice that southwest of Chengdu. As of 2011, it has two residential communities (社区) and seven villages under its administration.

== See also ==
- List of township-level divisions of Sichuan
