= Laishui County =

Laishui County 涞水县
- County
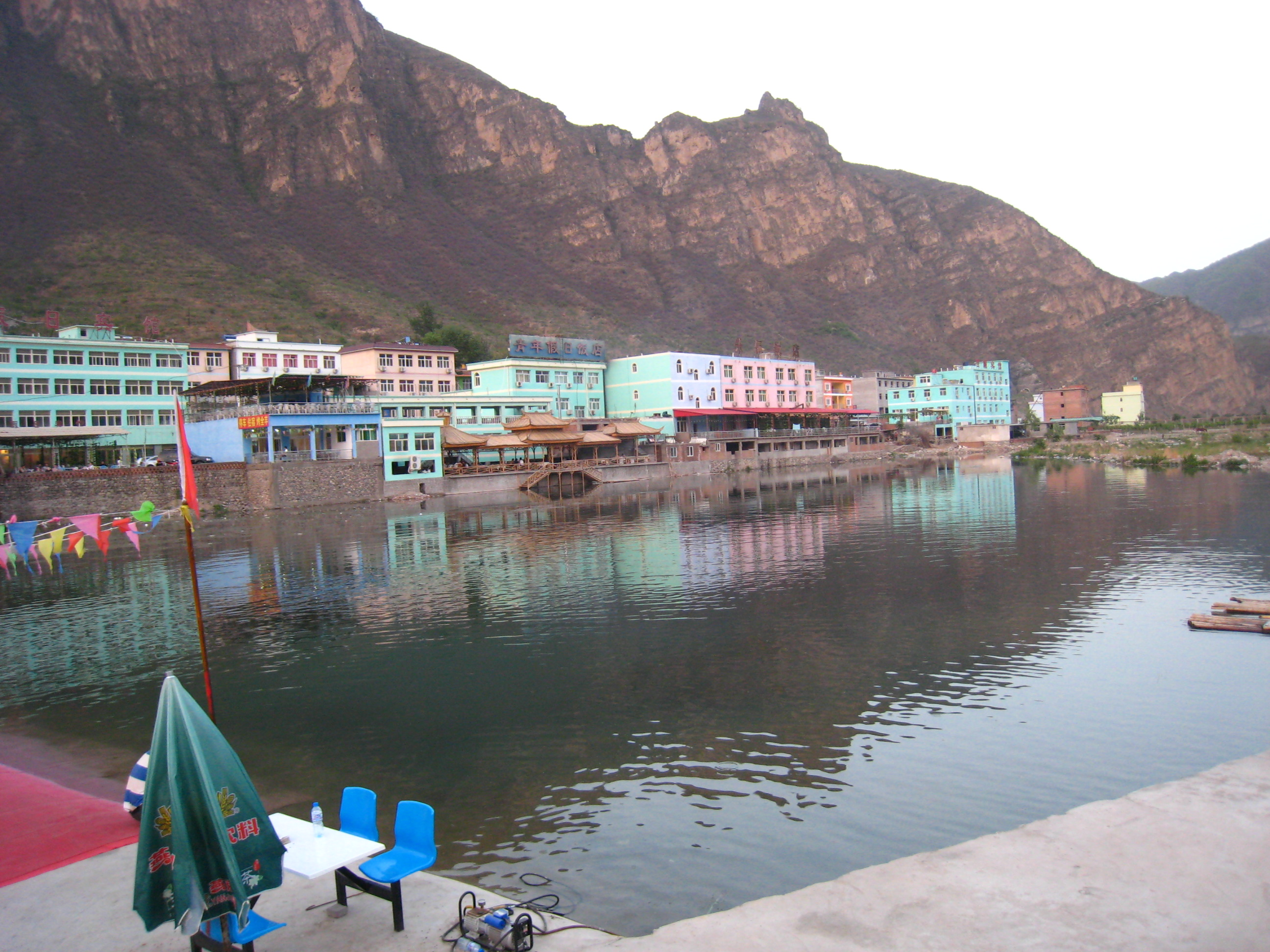

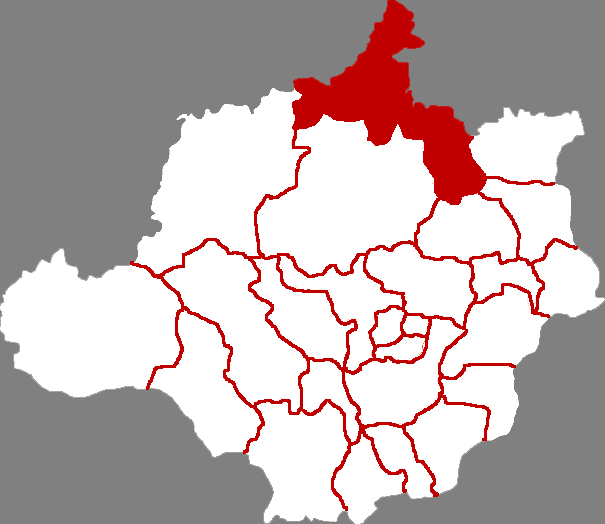
- Laishui in Baoding

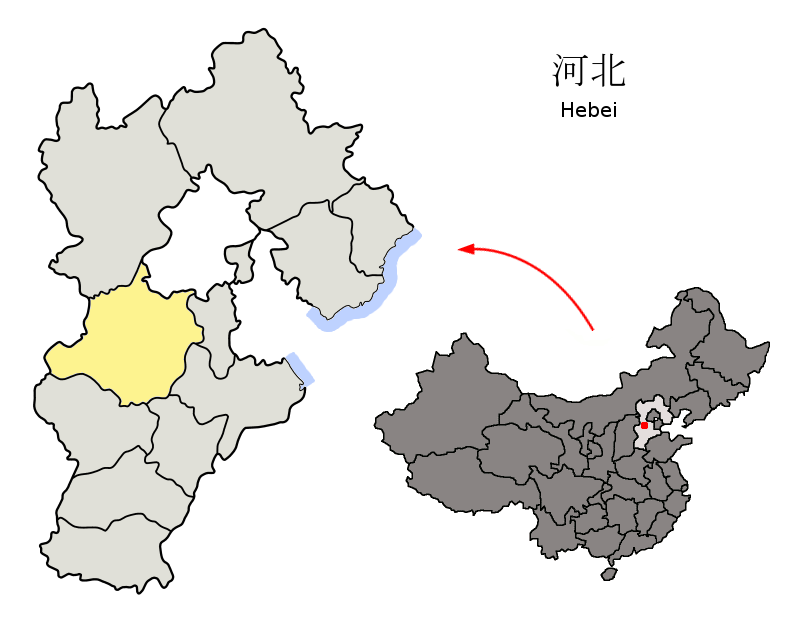
- Baoding in Hebei
- Coordinates: 39°23′38″N 115°42′50″E
- Country: People's Republic of China
- Province: Hebei
- Prefecture-level city: Baoding
- County seat: Laishui Town (涞水镇)

Area
  - Total: 1,666 km^{2} (643 sq mi)
- Elevation: 42 m (138 ft)

Population (2020 census)
  - Total: 315,753
  - Density: 189.5/km^{2} (490.9/sq mi)
- Time zone: UTC+8 (China Standard)
- Postal code: 074100

Laishui County (simplified Chinese: 涞水县; traditional Chinese: 淶水縣; pinyin: Láishuǐ Xiàn) is a county in central Hebei province, China, bordering the Municipality of Beijing to the north and in the basin of the Juma River. It is under the administration of the prefecture-level city of Baoding and contains its northernmost point; it has a population of 315,753 in 2020 residing in an area of 1,666 km^{2} (643 sq mi). It is served by China National Highway 112 and G5 Beijing–Kunming Expressway.

== Administrative divisions ==
There are 7 towns, 7 townships, and 1 ethnic township under the county's administration.

Towns:

- Laishui (涞水镇), Yi'an (义安镇), Shiting (石亭镇), Zhaogezhuang (赵各庄镇), Yongyang (永阳镇), Sanpo (三坡镇), Jiulong (九龙镇)

Townships:

- Longmen Township (龙门乡), Qizhongkou Township (其中口乡), Songgezhuang Township (宋各庄乡), Hujiazhuang Township (胡家庄乡), Mingyi Township (明义乡), Wangcun Township (王村乡), Dongwenshan Township (东文山乡), Loucun Manchu Ethnic Township (娄村满族乡)

== History ==
In mid-May 1900, the Laishui Incident, a significant event during the Boxer Rebellion, occurred. After an attack by the Society of Righteous and Harmonious Fists (Boxers) on Chinese Christians in Laishui county, a force of 60 men commanded by Colonel Yang Futong clashed with the Boxers several times, beginning on 15 May. On 22 May, Boxer forces ambushed the government forces and killed Yang. The Laishui Incident inspired increased Boxer attacks (including on railways and the occupation of Zhuozhou). It also strengthened the argument by some in the Qing court who thought the Boxer movement could harnessed against the foreign powers.
