= Heyang County =

Heyang County 合阳县 Hoyang
- County
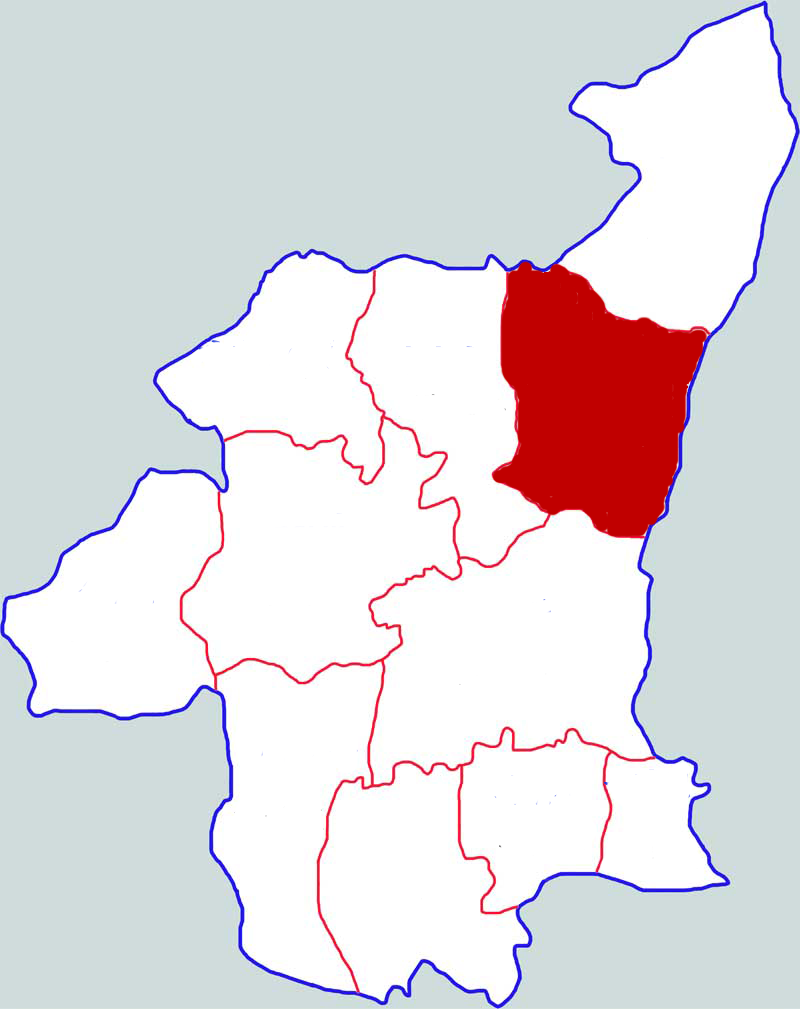
- Heyang in Weinan

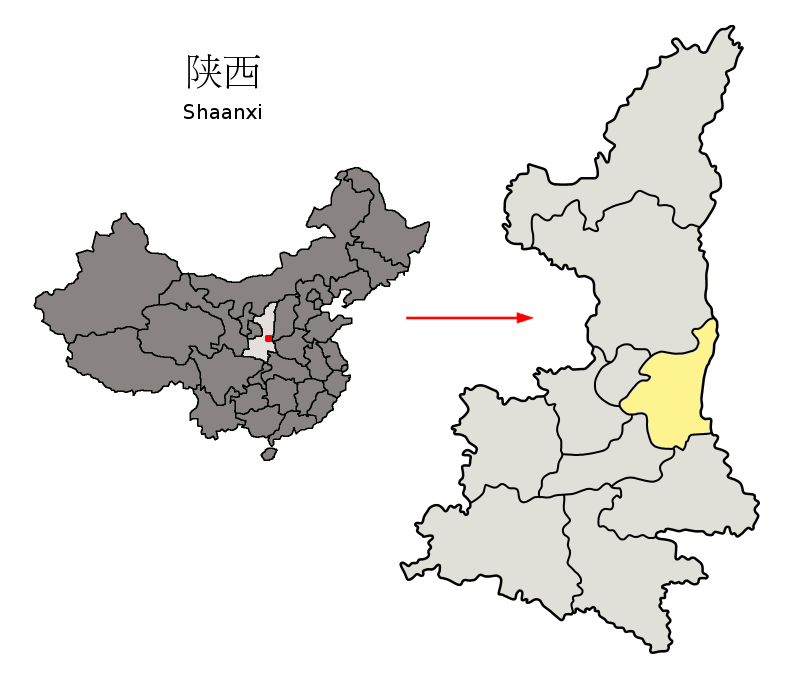
- Weinan in Shaanxi
- Coordinates: 35°14′17″N 110°08′56″E
- Country: People's Republic of China
- Province: Shaanxi
- Prefecture-level city: Weinan

Area
  - Total: 1,437 km^{2} (555 sq mi)

Population (2019)
  - Total: 510,000
  - Density: 350/km^{2} (920/sq mi)
- Time zone: UTC+8 (China standard time)
- Postal code: 715300
- Licence plates: 陕E

Heyang County (simplified Chinese: 合阳县; traditional Chinese: 合陽縣; pinyin: Héyáng Xiàn, 郃陽) is a county in Shaanxi Province, China, bordering Shanxi Province to the east across the Yellow River. It is under the administration of the prefecture-level city of Weinan.

== History ==
Heyang County dates to at least the early Han, when Liu Bang's elder brother Liu Xi was demoted to being its marquess after fleeing a Xiongnu attack on Dai c. 200 BC.

== Legacy ==
A species of stone loach, Triplophysa heyangensis, is named after Heyang County where it was first discovered.

== Administrative divisions ==
As of 2016, this county is divided to 12 towns.

Towns

- Chengguan (城关镇)
- Ganjing (甘井镇)
- Fang (坊镇)
- Qiachuan (洽川镇)
- Xinchi (新池镇)
- Heichi (黑池镇)
- Lujing (路井镇)
- Hejiazhuang (和家庄镇)
- Wangcun (王村镇)
- Tongjiazhuang (同家庄镇)
- Bailiang (百良镇)
- Jinyu (金峪镇)

== Climate ==
Climate data for Heyang, elevation 753 m (2,470 ft), (1991–2020 normals, extremes 1981–2010)
Month	Jan	Feb	Mar	Apr	May	Jun	Jul	Aug	Sep	Oct	Nov	Dec	Year
Record high °C (°F)	16.2 (61.2)	20.5 (68.9)	27.7 (81.9)	36.8 (98.2)	37.1 (98.8)	39.2 (102.6)	39.2 (102.6)	37.7 (99.9)	37.3 (99.1)	30.2 (86.4)	23.6 (74.5)	18.8 (65.8)	39.2 (102.6)
Mean daily maximum °C (°F)	3.8 (38.8)	7.9 (46.2)	14.1 (57.4)	20.9 (69.6)	25.8 (78.4)	29.9 (85.8)	30.8 (87.4)	28.9 (84.0)	24.1 (75.4)	18.3 (64.9)	11.4 (52.5)	5.4 (41.7)	18.4 (65.2)
Daily mean °C (°F)	−1.7 (28.9)	2.1 (35.8)	8.1 (46.6)	14.5 (58.1)	19.5 (67.1)	24.0 (75.2)	25.5 (77.9)	23.8 (74.8)	19.0 (66.2)	12.9 (55.2)	5.9 (42.6)	−0.2 (31.6)	12.8 (55.0)
Mean daily minimum °C (°F)	−6.0 (21.2)	−2.2 (28.0)	3.2 (37.8)	8.7 (47.7)	13.5 (56.3)	18.4 (65.1)	21.1 (70.0)	19.9 (67.8)	15.1 (59.2)	8.7 (47.7)	1.6 (34.9)	−4.4 (24.1)	8.1 (46.7)
Record low °C (°F)	−19.0 (−2.2)	−15.0 (5.0)	−12.7 (9.1)	−4.3 (24.3)	−0.8 (30.6)	7.4 (45.3)	13.3 (55.9)	11.5 (52.7)	2.6 (36.7)	−6.0 (21.2)	−16.5 (2.3)	−21.2 (−6.2)	−21.2 (−6.2)
Average precipitation mm (inches)	6.2 (0.24)	9.7 (0.38)	15.4 (0.61)	31.7 (1.25)	47.7 (1.88)	61.8 (2.43)	99.9 (3.93)	104.7 (4.12)	79.9 (3.15)	48.6 (1.91)	19.9 (0.78)	3.3 (0.13)	528.8 (20.81)
Average precipitation days (≥ 0.1 mm)	3.2	3.7	4.4	6.1	7.9	8.0	10.3	9.8	9.9	7.7	5.4	2.5	78.9
Average snowy days	4.0	3.3	1.7	0.2	0	0	0	0	0	0	1.6	3.1	13.9
Average relative humidity (%)	53	54	52	55	56	58	70	74	74	70	64	54	61
Mean monthly sunshine hours	179.8	167.8	206.9	229.9	240.5	230.9	231.6	221.1	175.9	170.6	164.2	178.6	2,397.8
Percentage possible sunshine	57	54	55	58	55	53	53	54	48	49	54	59	54
Source: China Meteorological Administration
