= Luojiang, Deyang =

Coordinates: 31°19′54″N 104°32′12″E

Luojiang 罗江区
- District
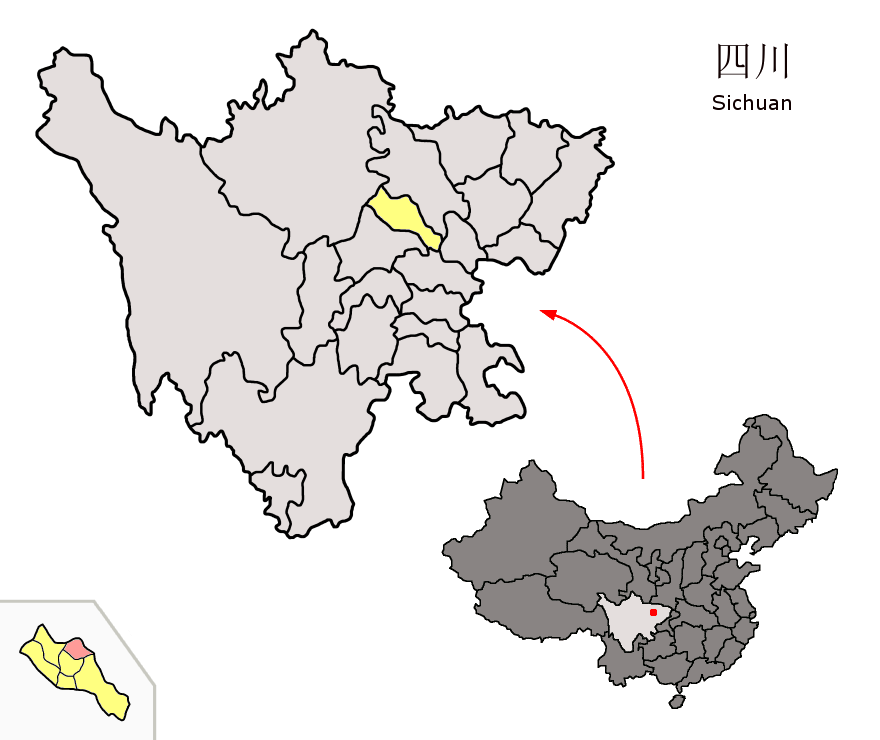
- Location of Luojiang in Sichuan
- Country: China
- Province: Sichuan
- Prefecture-level city: Deyang

Area
  - Total: 447.88 km^{2} (172.93 sq mi)

Population (2018)
  - Total: 228,000
  - Density: 509/km^{2} (1,320/sq mi)
- Time zone: UTC+8 (China Standard)

Luojiang District (simplified Chinese: 罗江区; traditional Chinese: 羅江區; pinyin: Luójiāng Qū) is a district of Sichuan Province, China. It is under the administration of Deyang city.

== Administrative divisions ==
Luojiang District comprises 7 towns:

- Wan'an 万安镇
- Yanjia 鄢家镇
- Jinshan 金山镇
- Lüeping 略坪镇
- Tiaoyuan 调元镇
- Xinsheng 新盛镇
- Baimaguan 白马关镇

== Climate ==
Climate data for Luojiang (1981−2010)
Month	Jan	Feb	Mar	Apr	May	Jun	Jul	Aug	Sep	Oct	Nov	Dec	Year
Mean daily maximum °C (°F)	9.5 (49.1)	11.9 (53.4)	16.5 (61.7)	22.2 (72.0)	26.9 (80.4)	28.6 (83.5)	30.2 (86.4)	29.8 (85.6)	25.8 (78.4)	20.9 (69.6)	16.2 (61.2)	10.6 (51.1)	20.8 (69.4)
Mean daily minimum °C (°F)	2.8 (37.0)	5.1 (41.2)	8.5 (47.3)	13.2 (55.8)	17.7 (63.9)	21.0 (69.8)	22.6 (72.7)	22.0 (71.6)	19.1 (66.4)	14.8 (58.6)	9.6 (49.3)	4.2 (39.6)	13.4 (56.1)
Average precipitation mm (inches)	7.1 (0.28)	10.3 (0.41)	17.9 (0.70)	42.4 (1.67)	73.2 (2.88)	102.2 (4.02)	203.8 (8.02)	181.4 (7.14)	127.5 (5.02)	35.8 (1.41)	10.7 (0.42)	4.2 (0.17)	816.5 (32.14)
Source: National Meteorological Center of CMA
