= Xinjin, Chengdu =

District of Chengdu, Sichuan, China

Xinjin 新津区
- District
- District of Xinjin, City of Chengdu
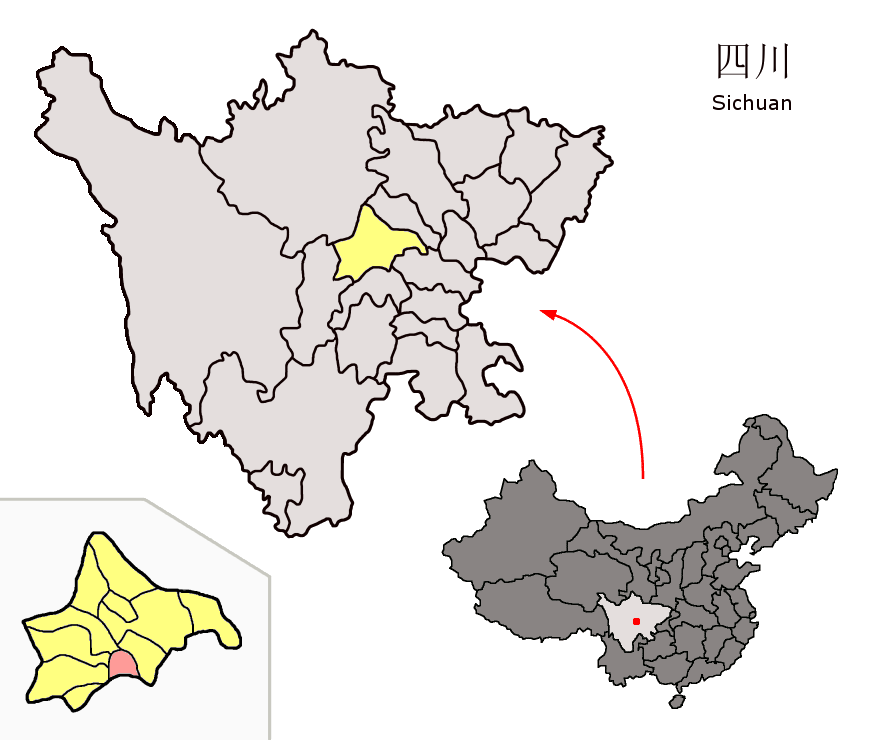
- Location of Xinjin in Sichuan

- Location of the seat in Sichuan
- Coordinates: 30°24′54″N 103°48′32″E
- District: China
- Province: Sichuan
- Sub-provincial city: Chengdu

Area
  - Total: 330 km^{2} (130 sq mi)

Population (2020 census)
  - Total: 363,591
  - Density: 1,100/km^{2} (2,900/sq mi)
- Time zone: UTC+8 (China Standard)
- Postal code: 6114XX

Xinjin District (Chinese: 新津区; pinyin: Xīnjīn Qū; lit. 'new ford district') is a suburban district of the City of Chengdu, Sichuan, China. It borders the prefecture-level city of Meishan to the south. It has been a sister city of Hagerstown, Maryland since March 22, 2016.

== Administrative divisions ==
Xinjin District administers 4 subdistricts and 4 towns:

- Wujin Subdistrict 五津街道
- Puxing Subdistrict 普兴街道
- Huaqiao Subdistrict 花桥街道
- Huayuan Subdistrict 花源街道
- Xingyi Town 兴义镇
- Anxi Town 安西镇
- Yongshang Town 永商镇
- Baodun Town 宝墩镇

== Transport ==
- Line 10 (Chengdu Metro)
- Xinjin Airport

== Climate ==
Climate data for Xinjin, elevation 467 m (1,532 ft), (1991–2020 normals, extremes 1981–present)
Month	Jan	Feb	Mar	Apr	May	Jun	Jul	Aug	Sep	Oct	Nov	Dec	Year
Record high °C (°F)	19.4 (66.9)	23.4 (74.1)	31.3 (88.3)	33.0 (91.4)	35.5 (95.9)	35.4 (95.7)	38.7 (101.7)	40.2 (104.4)	36.0 (96.8)	30.0 (86.0)	25.8 (78.4)	18.6 (65.5)	40.2 (104.4)
Mean daily maximum °C (°F)	9.8 (49.6)	12.8 (55.0)	17.6 (63.7)	23.3 (73.9)	27.1 (80.8)	28.9 (84.0)	30.6 (87.1)	30.5 (86.9)	26.3 (79.3)	21.4 (70.5)	16.7 (62.1)	11.2 (52.2)	21.3 (70.4)
Daily mean °C (°F)	6.3 (43.3)	8.8 (47.8)	12.9 (55.2)	17.9 (64.2)	21.9 (71.4)	24.3 (75.7)	25.9 (78.6)	25.6 (78.1)	22.2 (72.0)	17.8 (64.0)	13.1 (55.6)	7.8 (46.0)	17.0 (62.7)
Mean daily minimum °C (°F)	3.7 (38.7)	5.9 (42.6)	9.5 (49.1)	14.0 (57.2)	18.0 (64.4)	21.1 (70.0)	22.7 (72.9)	22.3 (72.1)	19.6 (67.3)	15.5 (59.9)	10.7 (51.3)	5.4 (41.7)	14.0 (57.3)
Record low °C (°F)	−3.7 (25.3)	−2.2 (28.0)	−1.3 (29.7)	4.8 (40.6)	7.5 (45.5)	14.9 (58.8)	17.0 (62.6)	16.6 (61.9)	12.2 (54.0)	4.2 (39.6)	−0.3 (31.5)	−4.3 (24.3)	−4.3 (24.3)
Average precipitation mm (inches)	8.5 (0.33)	13.3 (0.52)	25.6 (1.01)	50.4 (1.98)	83.0 (3.27)	122.9 (4.84)	226.7 (8.93)	214.9 (8.46)	128.3 (5.05)	43.2 (1.70)	15.3 (0.60)	7.5 (0.30)	939.6 (36.99)
Average precipitation days (≥ 0.1 mm)	7.8	8.2	11	13.2	14.2	15.2	16.1	15.2	14.6	14.2	7.9	6.7	144.3
Average snowy days	0.8	0.3	0	0	0	0	0	0	0	0	0	0.3	1.4
Average relative humidity (%)	82	79	77	76	73	79	83	83	83	83	82	82	80
Mean monthly sunshine hours	40.8	53.3	82.5	110.0	116.5	107.8	123.5	132.3	69.3	53.2	49.5	44.1	982.8
Percentage possible sunshine	13	17	22	28	27	26	29	33	19	15	16	14	22
Source: China Meteorological Administration all-time extreme temperature all-time January highall-time July high
