= Mingshan, Ya'an =

Coordinates: 30°04′11″N 103°06′32″E

Mingshan 名山区
- District
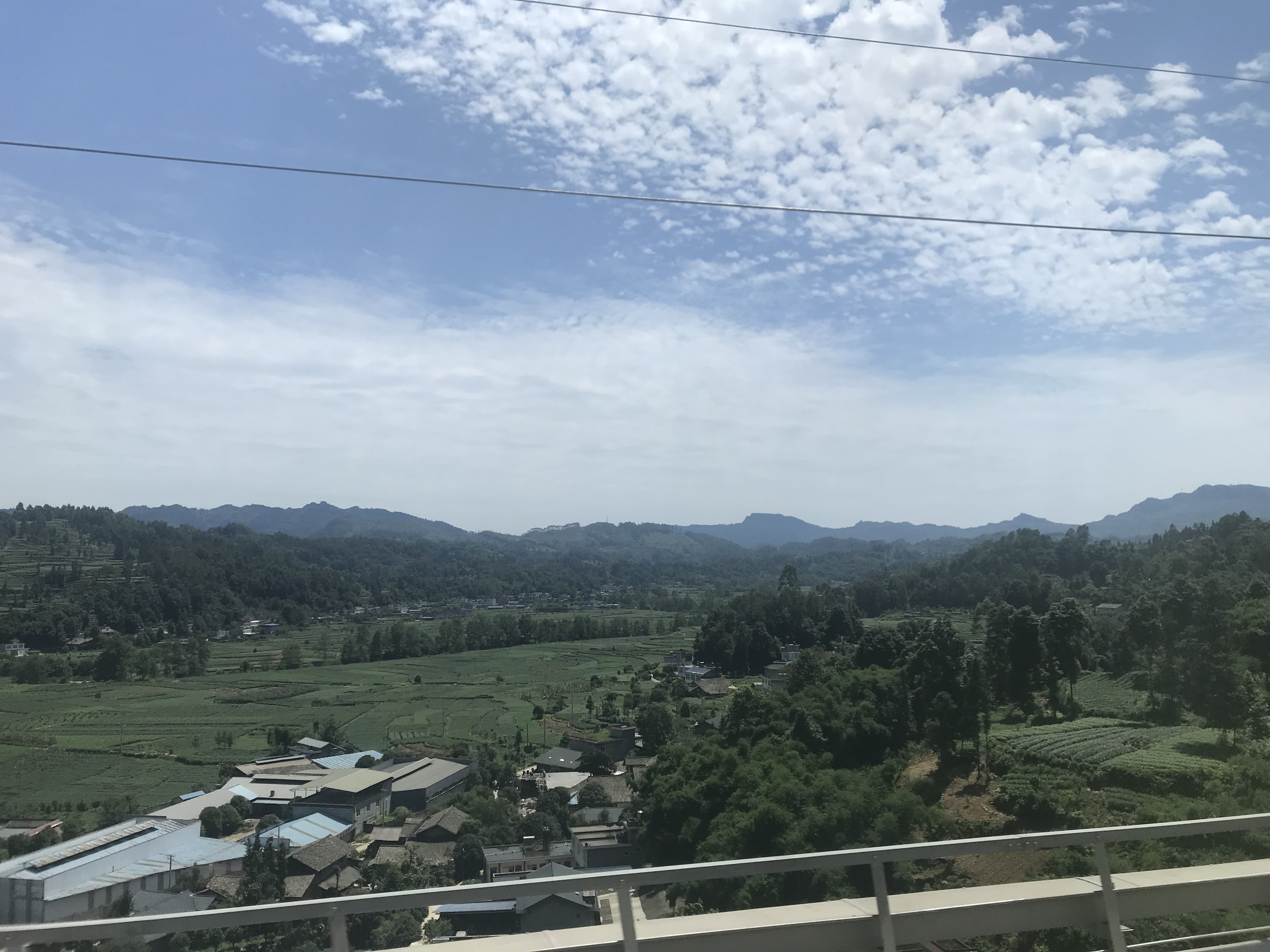

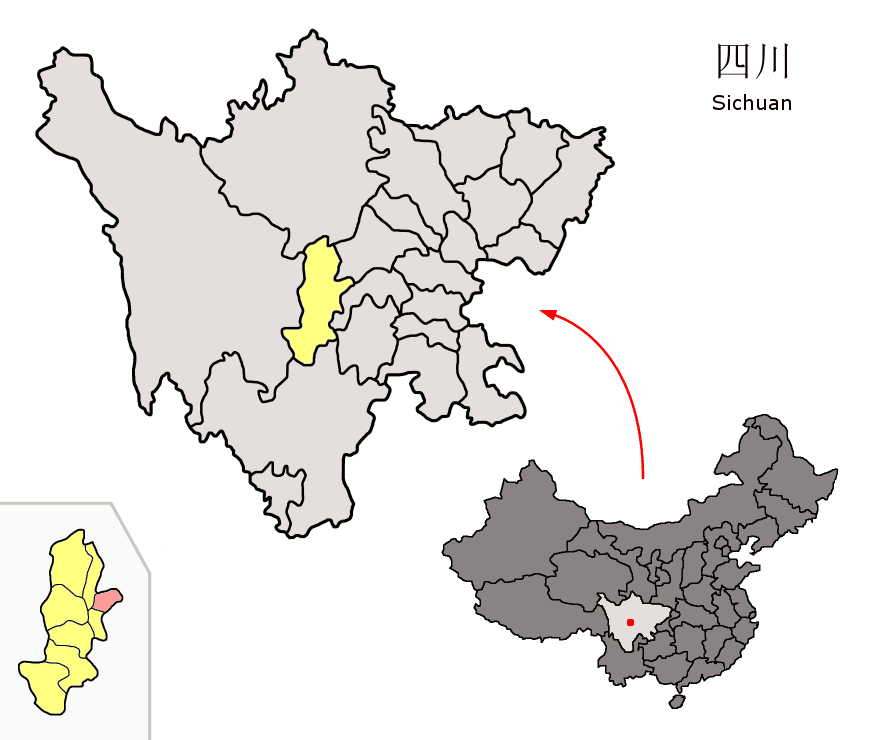
- Location of Mingshan District (red) within Ya'an City (yellow) and Sichuan
- Country: China
- Province: Sichuan
- Prefecture-level city: Ya'an
- District seat: Mengyang

Area
  - Total: 614 km^{2} (237 sq mi)

Population (2020 census)
  - Total: 254,632
  - Density: 415/km^{2} (1,070/sq mi)
- Time zone: UTC+8 (China Standard)

Mingshan District (Chinese: 名山区; pinyin: Míngshān Qū), formerly Mingshan County, is a district of the city of Ya'an, Sichuan Province, China, located northeast of the city center.

== Administrative divisions ==
Mingshan District comprises 2 subdistricts and 11 towns:

subdistricts

- Yongxing Subdistrict (永兴街道)
- Mengyang Subdistrict (蒙阳街道)

towns

- Baizhang Town (百丈镇)
- Cheling Town (车岭镇)
- Maling Town (马岭镇)
- Xindian Town (新店镇)
- Mengdingshan Town (蒙顶山镇)
- Heizhu Town (黑竹镇)
- Hongxing Town (红星镇)
- Zhongfeng Town (中峰镇)
- Maohe Town (茅河镇)
- Qianjin Town (前进镇)
- Wangu Town (万古镇)

== Climate ==
Climate data for Mingshan, elevation 691 m (2,267 ft), (1991–2020 normals, extremes 1981–present)
Month	Jan	Feb	Mar	Apr	May	Jun	Jul	Aug	Sep	Oct	Nov	Dec	Year
Record high °C (°F)	19.4 (66.9)	23.9 (75.0)	30.7 (87.3)	31.7 (89.1)	34.4 (93.9)	35.6 (96.1)	35.2 (95.4)	36.3 (97.3)	34.2 (93.6)	28.5 (83.3)	25.5 (77.9)	18.6 (65.5)	36.3 (97.3)
Mean daily maximum °C (°F)	8.8 (47.8)	11.4 (52.5)	16.1 (61.0)	21.8 (71.2)	25.4 (77.7)	27.7 (81.9)	29.5 (85.1)	29.3 (84.7)	24.7 (76.5)	19.8 (67.6)	15.4 (59.7)	10.2 (50.4)	20.0 (68.0)
Daily mean °C (°F)	5.6 (42.1)	7.8 (46.0)	11.7 (53.1)	16.7 (62.1)	20.4 (68.7)	23.0 (73.4)	24.8 (76.6)	24.4 (75.9)	20.8 (69.4)	16.4 (61.5)	12.1 (53.8)	7.0 (44.6)	15.9 (60.6)
Mean daily minimum °C (°F)	3.3 (37.9)	5.2 (41.4)	8.6 (47.5)	13.0 (55.4)	16.7 (62.1)	19.6 (67.3)	21.5 (70.7)	21.3 (70.3)	18.3 (64.9)	14.2 (57.6)	9.8 (49.6)	4.8 (40.6)	13.0 (55.4)
Record low °C (°F)	−3.6 (25.5)	−3.0 (26.6)	−1.2 (29.8)	4.3 (39.7)	7.9 (46.2)	13.4 (56.1)	16.4 (61.5)	15.6 (60.1)	11.8 (53.2)	3.7 (38.7)	−0.2 (31.6)	−5.7 (21.7)	−5.7 (21.7)
Average precipitation mm (inches)	18.4 (0.72)	26.8 (1.06)	46.3 (1.82)	77.4 (3.05)	121.6 (4.79)	162.0 (6.38)	332.9 (13.11)	350.9 (13.81)	166.1 (6.54)	83.9 (3.30)	37.4 (1.47)	18.5 (0.73)	1,442.2 (56.78)
Average precipitation days (≥ 0.1 mm)	13.7	13.2	16.1	16.1	17.1	18.5	19.2	19.0	20.4	20.2	14.3	13.1	200.9
Average snowy days	2.1	0.9	0	0	0	0	0	0	0	0	0	0.5	3.5
Average relative humidity (%)	83	82	79	77	76	80	83	84	86	88	86	85	82
Mean monthly sunshine hours	43.0	46.8	73.1	101.3	106.7	93.8	111.7	117.9	56.9	42.1	48.3	46.5	888.1
Percentage possible sunshine	13	15	19	26	25	22	26	29	15	12	15	15	19
Source: China Meteorological Administration all-time January high
