= List of counties in China =

Overview of county-level divisions in China

This is a list of all counties (including autonomous counties, autonomous banners, and banners) along with county-level cities (Chinese: 县级市; pinyin: xianjí shì) and city districts (Chinese: (市辖)区; pinyin: (shìxiá) qū). The list goes by province name, then ascending division code. Note that some numbers are skipped as those division codes were used by former county-level divisions now part of another county-level division. This list also includes the counties that are administered by the Republic of China (ROC), which are claimed by the PRC in its Taiwan and Fujian provinces.

== List ==
Name	Name in Chinese	Prefecture	Province	Type	Area (km^{2})	Population Census 2010	Division code	
Name	Name in Chinese	Prefecture	Province	Type	Area (km^{2})	Population Census 2010	numerical	alphabetical
Yaohai District	瑶海区	Hefei	Anhui	District	142.9	902,830	340102	YAI
Luyang District	庐阳区	Hefei	Anhui	District	139.32	609,239	340103	LUG
Shushan District	蜀山区	Hefei	Anhui	District	261.36	1,022,321	340104	SSA
Baohe District	包河区	Hefei	Anhui	District	294.94	817,686	340111	BAH
Changfeng County	长丰县	Hefei	Anhui	County	1,928.45	629,535	340121	CFG
Feidong County	肥东县	Hefei	Anhui	County	2,205.92	861,960	340122	FDO
Feixi County	肥西县	Hefei	Anhui	County	2,082.66	858,895	340123	FIX
Lujiang County	庐江县	Hefei	Anhui	County	2,347.48	973,850	340124	LJG
Chaohu City	巢湖市	Hefei	Anhui	City	2,031.22	780,700	340181	CHB
Jinghu District	镜湖区	Wuhu	Anhui	District	114.82	533,330	340202	JHW
Yijiang District	弋江区	Wuhu	Anhui	District	505.18	309,514	340203	YIJ
Jiujiang District	鸠江区	Wuhu	Anhui	District	870.65	421,695	340207	JJW
Wanzhi District	湾沚区	Wuhu	Anhui	District	670	294,039	340209	-
Fanchang District	繁昌区	Wuhu	Anhui	District	584.28	257,764	340210	-
Nanling County	南陵县	Wuhu	Anhui	County	1,259.53	404,278	340223	NLX
Wuwei City	无为市	Wuhu	Anhui	City	2,022	1,180,069	340281	-
Longzihu District	龙子湖区	Bengbu	Anhui	District	147.65	243,123	340302	LOZ
Bengshan District	蚌山区	Bengbu	Anhui	District	89.33	334,426	340303	BES
Yuhui District	禹会区	Bengbu	Anhui	District	329.72	249,361	340304	YUI
Huaishang District	淮上区	Bengbu	Anhui	District	402.68	145,874	340311	HIQ
Huaiyuan County	怀远县	Bengbu	Anhui	County	2,192.02	1,028,066	340321	HYW
Wuhe County	五河县	Bengbu	Anhui	County	1,428.56	621,973	340322	WHE
Guzhen County	固镇县	Bengbu	Anhui	County	1,360.75	541,644	340323	GZX
Datong District	大通区	Huainan	Anhui	District	306.26	180,917	340402	DTQ
Tianjia'an District	田家庵区	Huainan	Anhui	District	249.99	593,981	340403	TJA
Xiejiaji District	谢家集区	Huainan	Anhui	District	270.60	320,251	340404	XJJ
Bagongshan District	八公山区	Huainan	Anhui	District	67.15	175,993	340405	BGS
Panji District	潘集区	Huainan	Anhui	District	598.33	395,684	340406	PJI
Fengtai County	凤台县	Huainan	Anhui	County	1,091.63	667,070	340421	FTX
Shou County	寿县	Huainan	Anhui	County	2,948.34	1,008,116	340422	SHO
Huashan District	花山区	Ma'anshan	Anhui	District	178.76	303,855	340503	HSM
Yushan District	雨山区	Ma'anshan	Anhui	District	174.34	309,672	340504	YSQ
Bowang District	博望区	Ma'anshan	Anhui	District	379.96	183,500	340506	BWG
Dangtu County	当涂县	Ma'anshan	Anhui	County	969.69	624,771	340521	DTU
Hanshan County	含山县	Ma'anshan	Anhui	County	1,027.80	376,436	340522	HSW
He County	和县	Ma'anshan	Anhui	County	1,318.59	460,161	340523	HEX
Duji District	杜集区	Huaibei	Anhui	District	233.17	324,398	340602	DJQ
Xiangshan District	相山区	Huaibei	Anhui	District	141.72	467,358	340603	XSA
Lieshan District	烈山区	Huaibei	Anhui	District	384.88	321,565	340604	LHB
Suixi County	濉溪县	Huaibei	Anhui	County	1,981.62	1,000,955	340621	SXW
Tongguan District	铜官区	Tongling	Anhui	District	88.54	287,765	340705	TGG
Yi'an District	义安区	Tongling	Anhui	District	845.33	114,297	340706	YIA
Jiao District	郊区	Tongling	Anhui	District	586.80	72,301	340711	JTL
Zongyang County	枞阳县	Tongling	Anhui	County	1,470.45	249,595	340722	ZYW
Yingjiang District	迎江区	Anqing	Anhui	District	204.59	251,000	340802	YJQ
Daguan District	大观区	Anqing	Anhui	District	191.31	275,000	340803	DGQ
Yixiu District	宜秀区	Anqing	Anhui	District	414.39	254,000	340811	YUU
Huaining County	怀宁县	Anqing	Anhui	County	1,357.55	593,000	340822	HNW
Taihu County	太湖县	Anqing	Anhui	County	2,039.14	515,000	340825	THU
Susong County	宿松县	Anqing	Anhui	County	2,369.95	571,000	340826	SUS
Wangjiang County	望江县	Anqing	Anhui	County	1,347.98	527,000	340827	WJX
Yuexi County	岳西县	Anqing	Anhui	County	2,372.34	322,000	340828	YXW
Tongcheng City	桐城市	Anqing	Anhui	City	1,552.74	664,000	340881	TCW
Qianshan City	潜山市	Anqing	Anhui	City	1,687.97	500,000	340882	-
Tunxi District	屯溪区	Huangshan	Anhui	District	191.04	217,600	341002	TXN
Huangshan District	黄山区	Huangshan	Anhui	District	1,746.99	147,600	341003	HSK
Huizhou District	徽州区	Huangshan	Anhui	District	419.42	95,500	341004	HZQ
She County	歙县	Huangshan	Anhui	County	2,122.35	409,300	341021	SEX
Xiuning County	休宁县	Huangshan	Anhui	County	2,126.18	250,500	341022	XUN
Yi County	黟县	Huangshan	Anhui	County	857.42	80,700	341023	YIW
Qimen County	祁门县	Huangshan	Anhui	County	2,214.98	157,800	341024	QMN
Langya District	琅琊区	Chuzhou	Anhui	District	227.76	310,427	341102	LYV
Nanqiao District	南谯区	Chuzhou	Anhui	District	1,177.70	251,894	341103	NQQ
Lai'an County	来安县	Chuzhou	Anhui	County	1,498.63	432,021	341122	LAX
Quanjiao County	全椒县	Chuzhou	Anhui	County	1,568.36	383,885	341124	QJO
Dingyuan County	定远县	Chuzhou	Anhui	County	3,001.77	779,174	341125	DYW
Fengyang County	凤阳县	Chuzhou	Anhui	County	1,937.27	644,895	341126	FYG
Tianchang City	天长市	Chuzhou	Anhui	City	1,754.15	532,732	341181	TNC
Mingguang City	明光市	Chuzhou	Anhui	City	2,350.34	602,840	341181	MGG
Yingzhou District	颍州区	Fuyang	Anhui	District	622.89	691,698	341202	YGZ
Yingdong District	颍东区	Fuyang	Anhui	District	683.12	519,562	341203	YDO
Yingquan District	颍泉区	Fuyang	Anhui	District	650.73	557,687	341204	YQQ
Linquan County	临泉县	Fuyang	Anhui	County	1,838.77	1,543,218	341221	LQN
Taihe County	太和县	Fuyang	Anhui	County	1,867.19	1,361,145	341222	TIH
Funan County	阜南县	Fuyang	Anhui	County	1,800.66	1,168,117	341225	FNX
Yingshang County	颍上县	Fuyang	Anhui	County	1,986.99	1,196,535	341226	YSW
Jieshou City	界首市	Fuyang	Anhui	City	667.83	561,956	341282	JSW
Yongqiao District	埇桥区	Suzhou	Anhui	District	2,907.44	1,647,642	341282	YQO
Dangshan County	砀山县	Suzhou	Anhui	County	1,196.73	800,408	341321	DSW
Xiao County	萧县	Suzhou	Anhui	County	1,853.60	1,130,916	341322	XIO
Lingbi County	灵璧县	Suzhou	Anhui	County	2,124.05	975,308	341323	LBI
Si County	泗县	Suzhou	Anhui	County	1,856.96	798,650	341324	SIX
Jin'an District	金安区	Lu'an	Anhui	District	1,668.54	923,938	341502	JAU
Yu'an District	裕安区	Lu'an	Anhui	District	1,907.95	854,645	341503	YAQ
Yeji District	叶集区	Lu'an	Anhui	District	562.45	279,100	341504	YEJ
Huoqiu County	霍邱县	Lu'an	Anhui	County	3,239.66	1,246,129	341522	HQI
Shucheng County	舒城县	Lu'an	Anhui	County	2,109.51	749,273	341523	SCW
Jinzhai County	金寨县	Lu'an	Anhui	County	3,918.96	514,456	341524	JZX
Huoshan County	霍山县	Lu'an	Anhui	County	2,043.76	315,144	341525	HOS
Qiaocheng District	谯城区	Bozhou	Anhui	District	2,262.89	1,409,436	341602	QCH
Guoyang County	涡阳县	Bozhou	Anhui	County	2,109.90	1212054	341621	GOY
Mengcheng County	蒙城县	Bozhou	Anhui	County	2,143.93	1,062,080	341622	MCX
Lixin County	利辛县	Bozhou	Anhui	County	2,004.50	1,167,087	341623	LIX
Guichi District	贵池区	Chizhou	Anhui	District	2,504.97	595,268	341702	GCI
Dongzhi County	东至县	Chizhou	Anhui	County	3,250.01	468,280	341721	DZI
Shitai County	石台县	Chizhou	Anhui	County	1,413.83	92,238	341722	SHT
Qingyang County	青阳县	Chizhou	Anhui	County	1,196.00	246,732	341723	QGY
Xuanzhou District	宣州区	Xuancheng	Anhui	District	2,585.14	772,500	341802	XZO
Langxi County	郎溪县	Xuancheng	Anhui	County	1,100.55	320,600	341821	LGX
Jing County	泾县	Xuancheng	Anhui	County	2,033.23	299,600	341823	JXA
Jixi County	绩溪县	Xuancheng	Anhui	County	1,103.63	156100	341824	JXW
Jingde County	旌德县	Xuancheng	Anhui	County	907.00	120,000	341825	JDE
Ningguo City	宁国市	Xuancheng	Anhui	City	2,466.90	376,900	341881	NGU
Guangde City	广德市	Xuancheng	Anhui	City	2,116.10	487,200	341882	-
Dongcheng District	东城区	Directly administered	Beijing	District	40.6	919,000	110101	DCQ
Xicheng District	西城区	Directly administered	Beijing	District	50.7	1,243,000	110102	XCQ
Chaoyang District	朝阳区	Directly administered	Beijing	District	475	3,545,000	110105	CYQ
Fengtai District	丰台区	Directly administered	Beijing	District	306	2,112,000	110106	FTQ
Shijingshan District	石景山区	Directly administered	Beijing	District	86	616,000	110107	SJS
Haidian District	海淀区	Directly administered	Beijing	District	431	3,281,000	110108	HDN
Mentougou District	门头沟区	Directly administered	Beijing	District	1,321	290,000	110109	MTG
Fangshan District	房山区	Directly administered	Beijing	District	2,019	945,000	110111	FSQ
Tongzhou District	通州区	Directly administered	Beijing	District	906	1,184,000	110112	TZQ
Shunyi District	顺义区	Directly administered	Beijing	District	1,020	877,000	110113	SYI
Changping District	昌平区	Directly administered	Beijing	District	1,352	1,661,000	110114	CHP
Daxing District	大兴区	Directly administered	Beijing	District	1,012	1,365,000	110115	DXU
Huairou District	怀柔区	Directly administered	Beijing	District	2,557.3	373,000	110116	HRO
Pinggu District	平谷区	Directly administered	Beijing	District	950	416,000	110117	PGU
Miyun District	密云区	Directly administered	Beijing	District	2,227	468,000	110118	MYI
Yanqing District	延庆区	Directly administered	Beijing	District	1,992	317,000	110119	YQY
Wanzhou District	万州区	Directly administered	Chongqing	District	3,457	1,563,100	500101	WZO
Fuling District	涪陵区	Directly administered	Chongqing	District	2,946	1,066,700	500102	FLG
Yuzhong District	渝中区	Directly administered	Chongqing	District	22	630,100	500103	YZQ
Dadukou District	大渡口区	Directly administered	Chongqing	District	103	301,000	500104	DDK
Shapingba District	沙坪坝区	Directly administered	Chongqing	District	383	1,000,000	500106	SPB
Jiulongpo District	九龙坡区	Directly administered	Chongqing	District	432	1,084,400	500107	JLP
Nan'an District	南岸区	Directly administered	Chongqing	District	274	759,600	500108	NAQ
Beibei District	北碚区	Directly administered	Chongqing	District	755	680,400	500109	BBE
Qijiang District	綦江区	Directly administered	Chongqing	District	2,748	801,000	500110	QJC
Dazu District	大足区	Directly administered	Chongqing	District	1,433	671,200	500111	DZC
Banan District	巴南区	Directly administered	Chongqing	District	1,825	918,700	500113	BNN
Qianjiang District	黔江区	Directly administered	Chongqing	District	2,397	445,000	500114	QJU
Changshou District	长寿区	Directly administered	Chongqing	District	1,415	770,000	500115	CSO
Jiangjin District	江津区	Directly administered	Chongqing	District	3,200	1,233,100	500116	JJY
Hechuan District	合川区	Directly administered	Chongqing	District	2,356	1,293,000	500117	HEC
Yongchuan District	永川区	Directly administered	Chongqing	District	1,576	1,024,700	500118	YCP
Nanchuan District	南川区	Directly administered	Chongqing	District	2,602	534,300	500119	NCU
Bishan District	璧山区	Directly administered	Chongqing	District	912	586,000	500120	BSA
Tongliang District	铜梁区	Directly administered	Chongqing	District	1,342	600,100	500151	TLQ
Tongnan District	潼南区	Directly administered	Chongqing	District	1,585	640,000	500152	TNT
Rongchang District	荣昌区	Directly administered	Chongqing	District	1,079	661,300	500153	RGQ
Kaizhou District	开州区	Directly administered	Chongqing	District	3,959	1,160,300	500154	KZU
Liangping District	梁平区	Directly administered	Chongqing	District	1,890	687,500	500155	LPQ
Wulong District	武隆区	Directly administered	Chongqing	District	2,872	351,000	500156	WLO
Liangjiang New Area	两江新区	Directly administered	Chongqing	District	1,360			
Chengkou County	城口县	Directly administered	Chongqing	County	3,286	193,000	500229	CKO
Fengdu County	丰都县	Directly administered	Chongqing	County	2,896	649,200	500230	
Dianjiang County	垫江县	Directly administered	Chongqing	County	1,518	704,500	500231	DJG
Zhong County	忠县	Directly administered	Chongqing	County	2,184	751,400	500233	ZHX
Yunyang County	云阳县	Directly administered	Chongqing	County	3,634	912,900	500235	YNY
Fengjie County	奉节县	Directly administered	Chongqing	County	4,087	834,300	500236	FJE
Wushan County	巫山县	Directly administered	Chongqing	County	2,958	495,100	500237	
Wuxi County	巫溪县	Directly administered	Chongqing	County	4,030	414,100	500238	WXX
Shizhu Tujia Autonomous County	石柱土家族自治县	Directly administered	Chongqing	Autonomous county (Tujia)	3,013	415,100	500240	SZY
Xiushan Tujia and Miao Autonomous County	秀山土家族苗族自治县	Directly administered	Chongqing	Autonomous county (Tujia & Miao)	2,450	501,600	500241	XUS
Youyang Tujia and Miao Autonomous County	酉阳土家族苗族自治县	Directly administered	Chongqing	Autonomous county (Tujia & Miao)	5,173	578,100	500242	YUY
Pengshui Miao and Tujia Autonomous County	彭水苗族土家族自治县	Directly administered	Chongqing	Autonomous county (Miao & Tujia)	3,903	545,100	500243	PSU
Gulou	鼓楼区	Fuzhou	Fujian	District		687,706	350102	GLR
Taijiang	台江区	Fuzhou	Fujian	District		446,891	350103	TJQ
Cangshan	仓山区	Fuzhou	Fujian	District		762,746	350104	CSQ
Mawei	马尾区	Fuzhou	Fujian	District		231,929	350105	MWQ
Jin'an	晋安区	Fuzhou	Fujian	District		792,491	350111	JAF
Minhou	闽侯县	Fuzhou	Fujian	County		662,118	350121	MHO
Lianjiang	连江县	Fuzhou	Fujian	County		561,490	350122	LJF
Luoyuan	罗源县	Fuzhou	Fujian	County		207,677	350123	LOY
Minqing	闽清县	Fuzhou	Fujian	County		237,643	350124	MQG
Yongtai	永泰县	Fuzhou	Fujian	County		249,455	350125	YTX
Pingtan	平潭县	Fuzhou	Fujian	County		357,760	350128	PTN
Fuqing	福清市	Fuzhou	Fujian	City		1,234,838	350181	FQS
Changle	长乐区	Fuzhou	Fujian	District		682,626	350112	
Siming	思明区	Xiamen	Fujian	District		929,998	350203	SMQ
Haicang	海沧区	Xiamen	Fujian	District		288,739	350205	HCA
Huli	湖里区	Xiamen	Fujian	District		931,291	350206	HLQ
Jimei	集美区	Xiamen	Fujian	District		580,857	350211	JMQ
Tong'an	同安区	Xiamen	Fujian	District		496,129	350212	TAQ
Xiang'an	翔安区	Xiamen	Fujian	District		304,333	350213	XIU
Chengxiang	城厢区	Putian	Fujian	District		413,853	350302	CXP
Hanjiang	涵江区	Putian	Fujian	District		470,097	350303	HJQ
Licheng	荔城区	Putian	Fujian	District		499,110	350304	LEG
Xiuyu	秀屿区	Putian	Fujian	District		570,741	350305	XUG
Xianyou	仙游县	Putian	Fujian	County		824,707	350322	XYF
Sanyuan	三元区	Sanming	Fujian	District		198,958	350404	SYB
Mingxi	明溪县	Sanming	Fujian	County		102,667	350421	MXI
Qingliu	清流县	Sanming	Fujian	County		136,248	350423	QLX
Ninghua	宁化县	Sanming	Fujian	County		272,443	350424	NGH
Datian	大田县	Sanming	Fujian	County		311,631	350425	DTM
Youxi	尤溪县	Sanming	Fujian	County		352,067	350426	YXF
Shaxian	沙县区	Sanming	Fujian	District		226,669	350405	SAX
Jiangle	将乐县	Sanming	Fujian	County		148,867	350428	JLE
Taining	泰宁县	Sanming	Fujian	County		110,278	350429	TNG
Jianning	建宁县	Sanming	Fujian	County		119,979	350430	TNF
Yong'an	永安市	Sanming	Fujian	City		347,042	350481	YAF
Licheng	鲤城区	Quanzhou	Fujian	District		404,817	350502	LCQ
Fengze	丰泽区	Quanzhou	Fujian	District		529,640	350503	FZE
Luojiang	洛江区	Quanzhou	Fujian	District		187,189	350504	LJQ
Quangang	泉港区	Quanzhou	Fujian	District		313,539	350505	QCQ
Hui'an	惠安县	Quanzhou	Fujian	County		944,231	350521	HAF
Anxi	安溪县	Quanzhou	Fujian	County		977,432	350524	ANX
Yongchun	永春县	Quanzhou	Fujian	County		452,217	350525	YCM
Dehua	德化县	Quanzhou	Fujian	County		277,867	350526	DHA
Shishi	石师市	Quanzhou	Fujian	City		636,700	350581	SHH
Jinjiang	晋江市	Quanzhou	Fujian	City		1,986,447	350582	JJG
Nan'an	南安市	Quanzhou	Fujian	City		1,418,451	350583	NAS
Kinmen County (claimed)	金门县	Quanzhou	Fujian	County		-	-	-
Xiangcheng	芗城区	Zhangzhou	Fujian	District		538,186	350602	XZZ
Longwen	龙文区	Zhangzhou	Fujian	District		167,463	350603	LWZ
Yunxiao	云霄县	Zhangzhou	Fujian	County		415,835	350622	YXO
Zhangpu	漳浦县	Zhangzhou	Fujian	County		802,971	350623	ZPU
Zhao'an	诏安县	Zhangzhou	Fujian	County		597,798	350624	ZAG
Changtai	长泰区	Zhangzhou	Fujian	District		206,809	350605	CTA
Dongshan	东山县	Zhangzhou	Fujian	County		211,505	350626	DSN
Nanjing	南靖县	Zhangzhou	Fujian	County		333,969	350627	NJX
Pinghe	平和县	Zhangzhou	Fujian	County		498,533	350628	PHE
Hua'an	华安县	Zhangzhou	Fujian	County		159,152	350629	HAN
Longhai	龙海区	Zhangzhou	Fujian	District		877,762	350604	LHM
Yanping	延平区	Nanping	Fujian	District		467,875	350702	YPQ
Shunchang	顺昌县	Nanping	Fujian	County		191,588	350721	SCG
Pucheng	蒲城县	Nanping	Fujian	County		304,583	350722	PCX
Guangze	光泽县	Nanping	Fujian	County		134,113	350723	GZE
Songxi	松溪县	Nanping	Fujian	County		125,472	350724	SOX
Zhenghe	政和县	Nanping	Fujian	County		171,715	350725	ZGH
Shaowu	邵武市	Nanping	Fujian	City		275,110	350781	SWU
Wuyishan	武夷山市	Nanping	Fujian	City		233,557	350782	WUS
Jian'ou	建瓯市	Nanping	Fujian	City		452,174	350783	JOU
Jianyang	建阳区	Nanping	Fujian	District		289,362	350703	JYU
Xinluo	新罗区	Longyan	Fujian	District		662,429	350802	XNL
Changting	长汀县	Longyan	Fujian	County		393,390	350821	CTG
Yongding	永定区	Longyan	Fujian	District		362,658	350803	YDN
Shanghang	上杭县	Longyan	Fujian	County		374,047	350823	SHF
Wuping	武平县	Longyan	Fujian	County		278,182	350824	WPG
Liancheng	连城县	Longyan	Fujian	County		248,645	350825	LCF
Zhangping	漳平市	Longyan	Fujian	City		240,194	350881	ZGP
Jiaocheng	蕉城区	Ningde	Fujian	District		429,260	350902	JIQ
Xiapu	霞浦县	Ningde	Fujian	County		461,176	350921	XPU
Gutian	古田县	Ningde	Fujian	County		323,700	350922	GTN
Pingnan	屏南县	Ningde	Fujian	County		137,724	350923	PNX
Shouning	寿宁县	Ningde	Fujian	County		175,874	350924	SNF
Zhouning	周宁县	Ningde	Fujian	County		112,701	350925	ZNX
Zherong	柘荣县	Ningde	Fujian	County		88,387	350926	ZRG
Fu'an	福安市	Ningde	Fujian	City		563,640	350981	FAS
Fuding	福鼎市	Ningde	Fujian	City		529,534	350982	FDG
Chengguan	城关区	Lanzhou	Gansu	District		1,278,745	620102	CLZ
Qilihe	七里河区	Lanzhou	Gansu	District		561,020	620103	QLH
Xigu	西固区	Lanzhou	Gansu	District		364,050	620104	XGU
Anning	安宁区	Lanzhou	Gansu	District		288,510	620105	ANQ
Honggu	红古区	Lanzhou	Gansu	District		136,101	620111	HOG
Yongdeng	永登县	Lanzhou	Gansu	County		418,789	620121	YDG
Gaolan	皋兰县	Lanzhou	Gansu	County		131,785	620122	GAL
Yuzhong	榆中县	Lanzhou	Gansu	County		437,163	620123	YZX
Jinchuan	金川区	Jinchang	Gansu	District		228,561	620302	JCU
Yongchang	永昌县	Jinchang	Gansu	County		235,489	620321	YCF
Baiyin	白银区	Baiyin	Gansu	District		294,400	620402	BYB
Pingchuan	平川区	Baiyin	Gansu	District		192,398	620403	PCQ
Jingyuan	靖远县	Baiyin	Gansu	County		454,925	620421	JYH
Huining	会宁县	Baiyin	Gansu	County		541,273	620422	HNI
Jingtai	景泰县	Baiyin	Gansu	County		225,755	620423	JGT
Qinzhou	秦州区	Tianshui	Gansu	District		643,906	620502	QZQ
Maiji	麦积区	Tianshui	Gansu	District		553,268	620503	MJI
Qingshui	清水县	Tianshui	Gansu	County		266,908	620521	QSG
Qin'an	秦安县	Tianshui	Gansu	County		515,423	620522	QNA
Gangu	甘谷县	Tianshui	Gansu	County		559,712	620523	GGU
Wushan	武山县	Tianshui	Gansu	County		437,268	620524	WSX
Zhangjiachuan Hui Autonomous County	张家川回族自治	Tianshui	Gansu	Autonomous county (Hui)		286,063	620525	ZJC
Liangzhou	凉州区	Wuwei	Gansu	District		1,010,295	620602	LQZ
Minqin	民勤县	Wuwei	Gansu	County		241,251	620621	MQN
Gulang	古浪县	Wuwei	Gansu	County		388,718	620622	GLG
Bairi Tibetan Autonomous County	天祝藏族自治县	Wuwei	Gansu	Autonomous county (Tibetan)		174,790	620623	TZG
Ganzhou	甘州区	Zhangye	Gansu	District		507,433	620702	GOU
Minle	民乐县	Zhangye	Gansu	County		219,356	620722	MLE
Linze	临泽县	Zhangye	Gansu	County		134,328	620723	LZE
Gaotai	高台县	Zhangye	Gansu	County		143,446	620724	GAT
Shandan	山丹县	Zhangye	Gansu	County		161,299	620725	SDN
Sunan Yugur Autonomous County	肃南裕固族自治县	Zhangye	Gansu	Autonomous county (Yugur)		33,653	620721	SUN
Kongtong	崆峒区	Pingliang	Gansu	District		504,848	620802	KTQ
Jingchuan	泾川县	Pingliang	Gansu	County		281,145	620821	JCN
Lingtai	灵台县	Pingliang	Gansu	County		183,937	620822	LGT
Chongxin	崇信县	Pingliang	Gansu	County		102,116	620823	COX
Huating	华亭市	Pingliang	Gansu	County		189,333	620881	
Zhuanglang	庄浪县	Pingliang	Gansu	County		382,827	620825	ZLG
Jingning	静宁县	Pingliang	Gansu	County		423,827	620826	JNI
Suzhou	肃州区	Jiuquan	Gansu	District		428,346	620902	SOU
Jinta	金塔县	Jiuquan	Gansu	County		147,460	620921	JTA
Guazhou	瓜州县	Jiuquan	Gansu	County		148,798	620922	GUZ
Subei Mongol Autonomous County	肃北蒙古族自治县	Jiuquan	Gansu	Autonomous county (Mongol)		14,979	620923	SBE
Aksay Kazakh Autonomous County	阿克塞哈萨克族自治县	Jiuquan	Gansu	Autonomous county (Kazakh)		10,545	620924	AKX
Yumen	玉门市	Jiuquan	Gansu	City		159,792	620981	YMS
Dunhuang	敦煌市	Jiuquan	Gansu	City		186,027	620982	DNH
Xifeng	西峰区	Qingyang	Gansu	District		377,528	621002	XFE
Qingcheng	庆城县	Qingyang	Gansu	County		261,898	621021	QIC
Huan(xian)	环县	Qingyang	Gansu	County		302,918	621022	HUN
Huachi	华池县	Qingyang	Gansu	County		120,875	621023	HCI
Heshui	合水县	Qingyang	Gansu	County		145,722	621024	HSX
Zhengning	正宁县	Qingyang	Gansu	County		180,909	621025	ZGN
Ning(xian)	宁县	Qingyang	Gansu	County		405,614	621026	NIG
Zhenyuan	镇原县	Qingyang	Gansu	County		415,727	621027	ZYN
Anding	安定区	Dingxi	Gansu	District		420,614	621102	ADQ
Tongwei	通渭县	Dingxi	Gansu	County		349,539	621121	TWE
Longxi	陇西县	Dingxi	Gansu	County		453,257	621122	LXK
Weiyuan	渭源县	Dingxi	Gansu	County		324,215	621123	WIY
Lintao	临洮县	Dingxi	Gansu	County		507,386	621124	LTO
Zhang(xian)	漳县	Dingxi	Gansu	County		192,957	621125	ZGX
Min(xian)	岷县	Dingxi	Gansu	County		450,654	621126	MIN
Wudu	武都区	Longnan	Gansu	District		555,004	621202	WUD
Cheng(xian)	成县	Longnan	Gansu	County		242,343	621221	CHG
Wen(xian)	文县	Longnan	Gansu	County		218,796	621222	WEG
Tanchang	宕昌县	Longnan	Gansu	County		274,313	621223	TCH
Kang(xian)	康县	Longnan	Gansu	County		180,061	621224	KNG
Xihe	西和县	Longnan	Gansu	County		393,272	621225	XHE
Li(xian)	礼县	Longnan	Gansu	County		458,237	621226	LXG
Hui(xian)	徽县	Longnan	Gansu	County		200,294	621227	HIX
Liangdang	两当县	Longnan	Gansu	County		45,398	621228	LDG
Linxia(shi)	临夏市	Linxia	Gansu	City		274,466	622901	LXR
Linxia(xian)	临夏县	Linxia	Gansu	County		326,123	622921	LXF
Kangle	康乐县	Linxia	Gansu	County		233,173	622922	KLE
Yongjing	永靖县	Linxia	Gansu	County		180,161	622923	YJG
Guanghe	广河县	Linxia	Gansu	County		227,466	622924	GHX
Hezheng	和政县	Linxia	Gansu	County		185,083	622925	HZG
Dongxiang	东乡县	Linxia	Gansu	Autonomous county (Dongxiang)		284,507	622926	DXZ
Jishishan	积石山县	Linxia	Gansu	Autonomous county (Bonan, Dongxiang & Salar)		235,698	622927	JSN
Hezuo	合作市	Gannan	Gansu	City		90,290	623001	HEZ
Lintan	临潭县	Gannan	Gansu	County		137,001	623021	LTN
Jonê	卓尼县	Gannan	Gansu	County		100,522	623022	JON
Zhouqu	舟曲县	Gannan	Gansu	County		132,108	623023	ZQU
Têwo	迭部县	Gannan	Gansu	County		52,166	623024	TEW
Maqu	玛曲县	Gannan	Gansu	County		54,745	623025	MQU
Luqu	碌曲县	Gannan	Gansu	County		35,630	623026	LQU
Xiahe	夏河县	Gannan	Gansu	County		86,670	623027	XHN
Liwan	荔湾区	Guangzhou	Guangdong	District		898,204	440103	LWQ
Yuexiu	越秀区	Guangzhou	Guangdong	District		1,157,277	440104	YXU
Haizhu	海珠区	Guangzhou	Guangdong	District		1,558,663	440105	HZU
Tianhe	天河区	Guangzhou	Guangdong	District		1,432,431	440106	THQ
Baiyun	白云区	Guangzhou	Guangdong	District		2,222,658	440111	BYN
Huangpu	黄埔区	Guangzhou	Guangdong	District		880,100	440112	HPU
Panyu	番禺区	Guangzhou	Guangdong	District		1,764,869	440113	PNY
Huadu	花都区	Guangzhou	Guangdong	District		945,053	440114	HDU
Nansha	南沙区	Guangzhou	Guangdong	District		259,899	440115	NSH
Zengcheng	增城区	Guangzhou	Guangdong	District		1,036,731	440118	ZCB
Conghua	从化区	Guangzhou	Guangdong	District		593,415	440117	CHE
Luohu	罗湖区	Shenzhen	Guangdong	District		923,423	440303	LHQ
Futian	福田区	Shenzhen	Guangdong	District		1,318,055	440304	FTN
Nanshan	南山区	Shenzhen	Guangdong	District		1,087,936	440305	NSN
Bao'an	宝安区	Shenzhen	Guangdong	District		4,017,807	440306	BAQ
Guangming	光明区	Shenzhen	Guangdong	District		481,420	440311	
Longhua	龙华区	Shenzhen	Guangdong	District		not established	440309	LHA
Longgang	龙岗区	Shenzhen	Guangdong	District		2,011,225	440307	LGG
Pingshan	坪山区	Shenzhen	Guangdong	District		309,211	440310	PSG
Dapeng	大鹏新区	Shenzhen	Guangdong	District		not established		
Yantian	盐田区	Shenzhen	Guangdong	District		208,861	440308	YTQ
Doumen	斗门区	Zhuhai	Guangdong	District		415,854	440403	DOU
Jinwan	金湾区	Zhuhai	Guangdong	District		251,783	440404	JNW
Xiangzhou	香洲区	Zhuhai	Guangdong	District		892,592	440402	XZQ
Longhu	龙湖区	Shantou	Guangdong	District		536,102	440507	LHH
Jinping	金平区	Shantou	Guangdong	District		810,606	440511	JPQ
Haojiang	濠江区	Shantou	Guangdong	District		267,597	440512	HJI
Chaoyang	潮阳区	Shantou	Guangdong	District		1,626,641	440513	CHY
Chaonan	潮南区	Shantou	Guangdong	District		1,290,922	440514	CHN
Chenghai	澄海区	Shantou	Guangdong	District		798,896	440515	CGH
Nan'ao	南澳县	Shantou	Guangdong	County		60,264	440523	NAN
Chancheng	禅城区	Foshan	Guangdong	District		1,101,077	440604	CHC
Nanhai	南海区	Foshan	Guangdong	District		2,588,844	440605	NAH
Shunde	顺德区	Foshan	Guangdong	District		2,461,701	440606	SUD
Gaoming	高明区	Foshan	Guangdong	District		420,044	440608	GOM
Sanshui	三水区	Foshan	Guangdong	District		622,645	440607	SJQ
Pengjiang	蓬江区	Jiangmen	Guangdong	District		719,120	440703	PJJ
Jianghai	江海区	Jiangmen	Guangdong	District		254,365	440704	JHI
Xinhui	新会区	Jiangmen	Guangdong	District		849,155	440705	XIN
Taishan	台山市	Jiangmen	Guangdong	City		941,087	440781	TSS
Kaiping	开平市	Jiangmen	Guangdong	City		697,395	440783	KPS
Heshan	鹤山市	Jiangmen	Guangdong	City		494,935	440784	HES
Enping	恩平市	Jiangmen	Guangdong	City		492,814	440785	ENP
Wujiang	武江区	Shaoguan	Guangdong	District		294,620	440203	WJQ
Zhenjiang	浈江区	Shaoguan	Guangdong	District		393,526	440204	ZJQ
Qujiang	曲江区	Shaoguan	Guangdong	District		303,377	440205	QUJ
Shixing	始兴县	Shaoguan	Guangdong	County		205,553	440222	SXX
Renhua	仁化县	Shaoguan	Guangdong	County		200,356	440224	RHA
Wengyuan	翁源县	Shaoguan	Guangdong	County		331,319	440229	WYN
Ruyuan Yao Autonomous County	乳源瑶族自治县	Shaoguan	Guangdong	Autonomous county (Yao)		177,471		
Xinfeng	新丰县	Shaoguan	Guangdong	County		206,108	440233	XFY
Lechang	乐昌市	Shaoguan	Guangdong	City		398,103	440281	LEC
Nanxiong	南雄市	Shaoguan	Guangdong	City		316,179	440282	NXS
Chikan	赤坎区	Zhanjiang	Guangdong	District		285,000	440802	CKQ
Xiashan	霞山区	Zhanjiang	Guangdong	District		416,000	440803	XAS
Potou	坡头区	Zhanjiang	Guangdong	District		333,700	440804	PTU
Mazhang	麻章区	Zhanjiang	Guangdong	District		577,600	440811	MZQ
Suixi	遂溪县	Zhanjiang	Guangdong	County		887,900	440823	SXI
Xuwen	徐闻县	Zhanjiang	Guangdong	County		699,100	440825	XWN
Lianjiang	廉江市	Zhanjiang	Guangdong	City		1,445,800	440881	LJS
Leizhou	雷州市	Zhanjiang	Guangdong	City		1,429,900	440882	LEZ
Wuchuan	吴川市	Zhanjiang	Guangdong	City		928,800	440883	WCS
Huicheng	惠城区	Huizhou	Guangdong	District		1,579,691	441302	HCQ
Huiyang	惠阳区	Huizhou	Guangdong	District		764,816	441303	HUY
Boluo	博罗县	Huizhou	Guangdong	County		1,038,198	441322	BOL
Huidong	惠东县	Huizhou	Guangdong	County		907,229	441323	HID
Longmen	龙门县	Huizhou	Guangdong	County		307,068	441324	LMN
Meijiang	梅江区	Meizhou	Guangdong	District		380,774	441402	MJQ
Meixian	梅县区	Meizhou	Guangdong	District		554,745	441403	MXN
Dabu	大埔县	Meizhou	Guangdong	County		374,731	441422	DBX
Fengshun	丰顺县	Meizhou	Guangdong	County		479,025	441423	FES
Wuhua	五华县	Meizhou	Guangdong	County		1,052,256	441424	WHY
Pingyuan	平远县	Meizhou	Guangdong	County		229,863	441426	PYY
Jiaoling	蕉岭县	Meizhou	Guangdong	County		205,862	441427	JOL
Xingning	兴宁市	Meizhou	Guangdong	City		962,883	441481	XNG
Maonan	茂南区	Maoming	Guangdong	District		820,934	440902	MNQ
Dianbai	电白区	Maoming	Guangdong	District		1,218,724	440904	DBD
Gaozhou	高州市	Maoming	Guangdong	City		1,288,724	440981	GZO
Huazhou	化州市	Maoming	Guangdong	City		1,178,873	440982	HZY
Xinyi	信宜市	Maoming	Guangdong	City		913,717	440983	XYY
Duanzhou	端州区	Zhaoqing	Guangdong	District		479,344	441202	DZQ
Dinghu	鼎湖区	Zhaoqing	Guangdong	District		164,701	441203	DGH
Guangning	广宁县	Zhaoqing	Guangdong	County		424,128	441223	GNG
Huaiji	怀集县	Zhaoqing	Guangdong	County		814,172	441224	HJX
Fengkai	封开县	Zhaoqing	Guangdong	County		398,304	441225	FKX
Deqing	德庆县	Zhaoqing	Guangdong	County		341,197	441226	DQY
Gaoyao	高要区	Zhaoqing	Guangdong	District		753357	441204	GYG
Sihui	四会市	Zhaoqing	Guangdong	City		542,882	441284	SHI
Cheng(qu)	城区	Shanwei	Guangdong	District		491,766	441502	CQS
Haifeng	海丰县	Shanwei	Guangdong	County		804,107	441521	HIF
Luhe	陆河县	Shanwei	Guangdong	County		314,153	441523	LHY
Lufeng	陆丰市	Shanwei	Guangdong	City		1,688,536	441581	LUF
Yuancheng	源城区	Heyuan	Guangdong	District		464,847	441602	YCQ
Zijin	紫金县	Heyuan	Guangdong	County		640,438	441621	ZJY
Longchuan	龙川县	Heyuan	Guangdong	County		695,680	441622	LCY
Lianping	连平县	Heyuan	Guangdong	County		337,172	441623	LNP
Heping	和平县	Heyuan	Guangdong	County		374,425	441624	HPY
Dongyuan	东源县	Heyuan	Guangdong	County		440,457	441625	DYN
Jiangcheng	江城区	Yangjiang	Guangdong	District		676,858	441702	JCQ
Yangdong	阳东区	Yangjiang	Guangdong	District		442,786	441704	YDA
Yangxi	阳西县	Yangjiang	Guangdong	County		452,663	441721	YXY
Yangchun	阳春市	Yangjiang	Guangdong	City		849,505	441781	YCU
Qingcheng	清城区	Qingyuan	Guangdong	District		810,971	441802	QCQ
Fogang	佛冈县	Qingyuan	Guangdong	County		302,782	441821	FGY
Yangshan	阳山县	Qingyuan	Guangdong	County		356,071	441823	YSN
Lianshan Zhuang and Yao Autonomous County	连山壮族瑶族自治县	Qingyuan	Guangdong	Autonomous county (Zhuang & Yao)		90,375	441825	LSZ
Liannan Yao Autonomous County	连南瑶族自治县	Qingyuan	Guangdong	Autonomous county (Yao)		129,207	441826	LNN
Qingxin	清新区	Qingyuan	Guangdong	District		698,826	441803	QXB
Yingde	英德市	Qingyuan	Guangdong	City		942,303	441881	YDS
Lianzhou	连州市	Qingyuan	Guangdong	City		367,859	441882	LZO
Xiangqiao	湘桥区	Chaozhou	Guangdong	District		452,472	445102	XQO
Chao'an	潮安区	Chaozhou	Guangdong	District		1,335,398	445103	CAA
Raoping	饶平县	Chaozhou	Guangdong	County		881,974	445122	RPG
Rongcheng	榕城区	Jieyang	Guangdong	District		741,674	445202	RCH
Jiedong	揭东区	Jieyang	Guangdong	District		1,157,720	445203	JDA
Jiexi	揭西县	Jieyang	Guangdong	County		825,313	445222	JEX
Huilai	惠来县	Jieyang	Guangdong	County		1,097,615	445224	HLY
Puning	普宁市	Jieyang	Guangdong	City		2,054,703	445281	PNG
Yuncheng	云城区	Yunfu	Guangdong	District		314,188	445302	YYF
Xinxing	新兴县	Yunfu	Guangdong	County		428,410	445321	XNX
Yunan	郁南县	Yunfu	Guangdong	County		388,727	445322	YNK
Yun'an	云安区	Yunfu	Guangdong	District		269,736	445303	YAG
Luoding	罗定市	Yunfu	Guangdong	City		959,067	445381	LUO
Xingning	兴宁区	Nanning	Guangxi	District		398,789	450102	XNE
Qingxiu	青秀区	Nanning	Guangxi	District		709,721	450103	QNU
Jiangnan	江南区	Nanning	Guangxi	District		567,999	450105	JNA
Xixiangtang	西乡塘区	Nanning	Guangxi	District		1,156,173	450107	XXT
Liangqing	良庆区	Nanning	Guangxi	District		344,768	450108	LQI
Yongning	邕宁区	Nanning	Guangxi	District		259,721	450109	YNG
Wuming	武鸣区	Nanning	Guangxi	County		544,478	450110	WMQ
Long'an	隆安县	Nanning	Guangxi	County		300,215	450123	LGA
Mashan	马山县	Nanning	Guangxi	County		390,900	450124	MSH
Shanglin	上林县	Nanning	Guangxi	County		343,590	450125	SLX
Binyang	宾阳县	Nanning	Guangxi	County		782,255	450126	BYX
Hengzhou	横州市	Nanning	Guangxi	City		863,001	450181	HEN
Chengzhong	城中区	Liuzhou	Guangxi	District		160,217	450202	CZG
Yufeng	鱼峰区	Liuzhou	Guangxi	District		356,296	450203	YFQ
Liunan	柳南区	Liuzhou	Guangxi	District		492,043	450204	LNU
Liubei	柳北区	Liuzhou	Guangxi	District		428,043	450205	LBE
Liujiang	柳江区	Liuzhou	Guangxi	County		562,351	450206	LJI
Liucheng	柳城县	Liuzhou	Guangxi	County		353,796	450222	LCB
Luzhai	鹿寨县	Liuzhou	Guangxi	County		421,019	450223	LZA
Rong'an	融安县	Liuzhou	Guangxi	County		285,641	450224	RAN
Rongshui Miao Autonomous County	融水苗族自治县	Liuzhou	Guangxi	Autonomous county (Miao)		402,054	450225	RSI
Sanjiang Dong Autonomous County	三江侗族自治县	Liuzhou	Guangxi	Autonomous county (Dong)		297,244	450226	SJG
Xiufeng	秀峰区	Guilin	Guangxi	District		103,984	450302	XUF
Diecai	叠彩区	Guilin	Guangxi	District		136,142	450303	DCA
Xiangshan	象山区	Guilin	Guangxi	District		224,492	450304	XSK
Qixing	七星区	Guilin	Guangxi	District		175,061	450305	QXG
Yanshan	雁山区	Guilin	Guangxi	District		71,191	450311	YSA
Lingui	临桂区	Guilin	Guangxi	District		472,057	450312	LGB
Yangshuo	阳朔县	Guilin	Guangxi	County		308,296	450321	YSO
Lingchuan	灵川县	Guilin	Guangxi	County		366,773	450323	LCU
Quanzhou	全州县	Guilin	Guangxi	County		803,495	450324	QZO
Xing'an	兴安县	Guilin	Guangxi	County		354,924	450325	XAG
Yongfu	永福县	Guilin	Guangxi	County		274,662	450326	YFU
Guanyang	灌阳县	Guilin	Guangxi	County		280,284	450327	GNY
Ziyuan	资源县	Guilin	Guangxi	County		170,413	450329	ZYU
Pingle	平乐县	Guilin	Guangxi	County		418,501	450330	PLE
Lipu	荔浦市	Guilin	Guangxi	City		374,169	450381	
Longsheng Various Nationalities Autonomous County	龙胜各族自治县	Guilin	Guangxi	Autonomous county (Various)		168,895	450328	LSG
Gongcheng Yao Autonomous County	恭城瑶族自治县	Guilin	Guangxi	Autonomous county (Yao)		285,058	450332	GGC
Wanxiu	万秀区	Wuzhou	Guangxi	District		159,000	450403	WXQ
Changzhou	长洲区	Wuzhou	Guangxi	District		148,100	450405	CHO
Longxu	龙圩区	Wuzhou	Guangxi	District		303,000	450406	LXV
Cangwu	苍梧县	Wuzhou	Guangxi	County		619,300	450421	CAW
Teng(xian)	藤县	Wuzhou	Guangxi	County		1,036,900	450422	TEG
Mengshan	蒙山县	Wuzhou	Guangxi	County		212,100	450423	MSA
Cenxi	岑溪市	Wuzhou	Guangxi	City		903,000	450481	CEX
Haicheng	海城区	Beihai	Guangxi	District		348,600	450502	HCB
Yinhai	银海区	Beihai	Guangxi	District		176,800	450503	YHB
Tieshangang	铁山港区	Beihai	Guangxi	District		142,700	450512	TSG
Hepu	合浦县	Beihai	Guangxi	County		871,200	450521	HPX
Gangkou	港口区	Fangchenggang	Guangxi	District		155,200	450602	GKQ
Fangcheng	防城区	Fangchenggang	Guangxi	District		362,900	450603	FCQ
Shangsi	上思县	Fangchenggang	Guangxi	County		204,100	450621	SGS
Dongxing	东兴市	Fangchenggang	Guangxi	City		144,700	450681	DOX
Qinnan	钦南区	Qinzhou	Guangxi	District		613,000	450702	QNQ
Qinbei	钦北区	Qinzhou	Guangxi	District		749,000	450703	QBQ
Lingshan	灵山县	Qinzhou	Guangxi	County		1,557,800	450721	LSB
Pubei	浦北县	Qinzhou	Guangxi	County		871,400	450722	PBE
Gangbei	港北区	Guigang	Guangxi	District		581,123	450802	GBE
Gangnan	港南区	Guigang	Guangxi	District		628,917	450803	GNQ
Qintang	覃塘区	Guigang	Guangxi	District		563,241	450804	QTQ
Pingnan	平南县	Guigang	Guangxi	County		1,422,379	450821	PNN
Guiping	桂平市	Guigang	Guangxi	City		1,837,441	450881	GPS
Yuzhou	玉州区	Yulin	Guangxi	District		1,056,700	450902	YZO
Fumian District	福绵区	Yulin	Guangxi	District		not established	450903	FMI
Rong(xian)	容县	Yulin	Guangxi	County		633,100	450921	ROG
Luchuan	陆川县	Yulin	Guangxi	County		762,400	450922	LCJ
Bobai	博白县	Yulin	Guangxi	County		1,342,500	450923	BBA
Xingye	兴业县	Yulin	Guangxi	County		560,400	450924	XGY
Beiliu	北流市	Yulin	Guangxi	City		1,132,200	450981	BLS
Youjiang	右江区	Baise	Guangxi	District		320,100	451002	YOQ
Tianyang	田阳区	Baise	Guangxi	County		338,300	451003	TYG
Tiandong	田东县	Baise	Guangxi	County		411,500	451022	TDO
Pingguo	平果市	Baise	Guangxi	City		470,800	451082	
Debao	德保县	Baise	Guangxi	County		350,800	451024	DEB
Jingxi	靖西市	Baise	Guangxi	City		605,100	451081	JXD
Napo	那坡县	Baise	Guangxi	County		195,600	451026	NPO
Lingyun	凌云县	Baise	Guangxi	County		193,600	451027	LYN
Leye	乐业县	Baise	Guangxi	County		167,100	451028	LYE
Tianlin	田林县	Baise	Guangxi	County		243,700	451029	TLN
Xilin	西林县	Baise	Guangxi	County		151,200	451030	XLX
Longlin Various Nationalities Autonomous County	隆林各族自治县	Baise	Guangxi	Autonomous county (Various)		378,500	451031	LLN
Babu	八步区	Hezhou	Guangxi	District		1,093,600	451102	BBQ
Pinggui	平桂区	Hezhou	Guangxi	District		not established	451103	PGI
Zhaoping	昭平县	Hezhou	Guangxi	County		402,200	451121	ZPG
Zhongshan	钟山县	Hezhou	Guangxi	County		423,300	451122	ZSG
Fuchuan Yao Autonomous County	富川瑶族自治县	Hezhou	Guangxi	Autonomous county (Yao)		312,800	451123	FUC
Jinchengjiang	金城江区	Hechi	Guangxi	District		308,100	451202	JCI
Nandan	南丹县	Hechi	Guangxi	County		291,400	451221	NDN
Tian'e	天峨县	Hechi	Guangxi	County		156,600	451222	TEX
Fengshan	凤山县	Hechi	Guangxi	County		195,700	451223	FSA
Donglan	东兰县	Hechi	Guangxi	County		295,500	451224	DLN
Luocheng Mulao Autonomous County	罗城仫佬族自治县	Hechi	Guangxi	Autonomous county (Mulao)		369,200	451225	LOC
Huanjiang Maonan Autonomous County	环江毛南族自治县	Hechi	Guangxi	Autonomous county (Maonan)		361,800	451226	HNJ
Bama Yao Autonomous County	巴马瑶族自治县	Hechi	Guangxi	Autonomous county (Yao)		266,700	451227	BMA
Du'an Yao Autonomous County	都安瑶族自治县	Hechi	Guangxi	Autonomous county (Yao)		672,000	451228	DUA
Dahua Yao Autonomous County	大化瑶族自治县	Hechi	Guangxi	Autonomous county (Yao)		446,200	451229	DAH
Yizhou	宜州区	Hechi	Guangxi	District		628,600	451203	YZC
Xingbin	兴宾区	Laibin	Guangxi	District		1,015,165	451302	XNB
Xincheng	忻城县	Laibin	Guangxi	County		405,384	451321	XCH
Xiangzhou	象州县	Laibin	Guangxi	County		354,918	451322	XGZ
Wuxuan	武宣县	Laibin	Guangxi	County		431,330	451323	WXN
Jinxiu Yao Autonomous County	金秀瑶族自治县	Laibin	Guangxi	Autonomous county (Yao)		152,212	451324	JXU
Heshan	合山市	Laibin	Guangxi	City		139,227	451381	HSS
Jiangzhou	江州区	Chongzuo	Guangxi	District		347,800	451402	JOQ
Fusui	扶绥县	Chongzuo	Guangxi	County		432,000	451421	FSU
Ningming	宁明县	Chongzuo	Guangxi	County		412,300	451422	NMG
Longzhou	龙州县	Chongzuo	Guangxi	County		260,200	451423	LZX
Daxin	大新县	Chongzuo	Guangxi	County		359,800	451424	DXN
Tiandeng	天等县	Chongzuo	Guangxi	County		429,200	451425	TDG
Pingxiang	凭祥市	Chongzuo	Guangxi	City		106,400	451481	PIN
Nanming	南明区	Guiyang	Guizhou	District		829,948	520102	NMQ
Yunyan	云岩区	Guiyang	Guizhou	District		957,535	520103	YYQ
Huaxi	花溪区	Guiyang	Guizhou	District		360,054	520111	HXI
Wudang	乌当区	Guiyang	Guizhou	District		376,920	520112	WDQ
Baiyun	白云区	Guiyang	Guizhou	District		264,543	520113	BYU
Guanshanhu	观山湖区	Guiyang	Guizhou	District		not established	520115	GSH
Kaiyang	开阳县	Guiyang	Guizhou	County		358,130	520121	KYG
Xifeng	息烽县	Guiyang	Guizhou	County		212,879	520122	XFX
Xiuwen	修文县	Guiyang	Guizhou	County		248,955	520123	XWX
Qingzhen	清镇市	Guiyang	Guizhou	City		467,438	520181	QZN
Zhongshan	钟山区	Liupanshui	Guizhou	District		616,774	520201	ZSQ
Liuzhi	六枝特区	Liupanshui	Guizhou	District		495,008	520203	LZT
Panzhou	盘州市	Liupanshui	Guizhou	City		1,034,903	520281	PZU
Shuicheng	水城区	Liupanshui	Guizhou	County		704,495	520205	
Honghuagang	红花岗区	Zunyi	Guizhou	District		656,725	520302	HHG
Huichuan	汇川区	Zunyi	Guizhou	District		438,464	520303	HHQ
Bozhou	播州区	Zunyi	Guizhou	District		944,326	520304	BZG
Tongzi	桐梓县	Zunyi	Guizhou	County		521,567	520322	TZI
Suiyang	绥阳县	Zunyi	Guizhou	County		379,938	520323	SUY
Zheng'an	正安县	Zunyi	Guizhou	County		389,434	520324	ZAX
Daozhen Gelao and Miao Autonomous County	道真仡佬族苗族自治县	Zunyi	Guizhou	Autonomous county (Gelao & Miao)		244,123	520325	DZN
Fenggang	凤冈县	Zunyi	Guizhou	County		313,005	520327	FGG
Meitan	湄潭县	Zunyi	Guizhou	County		377,354	520328	MTN
Yuqing	余庆县	Zunyi	Guizhou	County		234,681	520329	YUQ
Xishui	习水县	Zunyi	Guizhou	County		522,541	520330	XSI
Wuchuan Gelao and Miao Autonomous County	务川仡佬族苗族自治县	Zunyi	Guizhou	Autonomous county (Gelao & Maio)		321,581	520326	WCU
Chishui	赤水市	Zunyi	Guizhou	City		237,029	520381	CSS
Renhuai	仁怀市	Zunyi	Guizhou	City		546,241	520382	RHS
Xixiu	西秀区	Anshun	Guizhou	District		765,313	520402	XXU
Pingba	平坝区	Anshun	Guizhou	County		298,034	520403	PIB
Puding	普定县	Anshun	Guizhou	County		378,288	520422	PUD
Zhenning Buyei and Miao Autonomous County	镇宁布依族苗族自治县	Anshun	Guizhou	Autonomous county (Buyei & Miao)		283,880	520423	ZNN
Guanling Buyei and Miao Autonomous County	关岭布依族苗族自治县	Anshun	Guizhou	Autonomous county (Buyei & Miao)		301,562	520424	GNL
Ziyun Miao and Buyei Autonomous County	紫云苗族布依族自治县	Anshun	Guizhou	Autonomous county (Miao & Buyei)		270,262	520425	ZYF
Bijiang	碧江区	Tongren	Guizhou	District		361,864	520602	BJN
Wanshan	万山区	Tongren	Guizhou	District		47,844	520603	WSW
Jiangkou	江口县	Tongren	Guizhou	County		172,753	520621	JGK
Shiqian	石阡县	Tongren	Guizhou	County		304,218	520623	SQI
Sinan	思南县	Tongren	Guizhou	County		499,398	520624	SNA
Dejiang	德江县	Tongren	Guizhou	County		367,908	520626	DEJ
Yuping Dong Autonomous County	玉屏侗族自治县	Tongren	Guizhou	Autonomous county (Dong)		118,398	520622	YPG
Yinjiang Tujia and Miao Autonomous County	印江土家族苗族自治县	Tongren	Guizhou	Autonomous county (Tujia & Miao)		284,110	520625	YJY
Yanhe Tujia Autonomous County	沿河土家族自治县	Tongren	Guizhou	Autonomous county (Tujia)		449,361	520627	YHE
Songtao Miao Autonomous County	松桃苗族自治县	Tongren	Guizhou	Autonomous county (Miao)		486,511	520628	STM
Qixingguan	七星关区	Bijie	Guizhou	District		1,136,905	520502	QXD
Dafang	大方县	Bijie	Guizhou	County		776,246	520521	DAF
Qianxi	黔西市	Bijie	Guizhou	City		695,735	520581	QNX
Jinsha	金沙县	Bijie	Guizhou	County		560,651	520523	JSX
Zhijin	织金县	Bijie	Guizhou	County		783,951	520524	ZJN
Nayong	纳雍县	Bijie	Guizhou	County		669,781	520525	NYG
Hezhang	赫章县	Bijie	Guizhou	County		1,263,816	520527	HZA
Weining Yi, Hui, and Miao Autonomous County	威宁彝族回族苗族自治县	Bijie	Guizhou	Autonomous county (Yi, Hui, & Miao)		649,285	520526	WNG
Xingyi	兴义市	Qianxinan	Guizhou	City		784,032	522301	XYI
Xingren	兴仁市	Qianxinan	Guizhou	City		417,829	522302	
Pu'an	普安县	Qianxinan	Guizhou	County		254,328	522323	PUA
Qinglong	晴隆县	Qianxinan	Guizhou	County		246,594	522324	QLG
Zhenfeng	贞丰县	Qianxinan	Guizhou	County		303,762	522325	ZFG
Wangmo	望谟县	Qianxinan	Guizhou	County		251,629	522326	WMO
Ceheng	册亨县	Qianxinan	Guizhou	County		190,379	522327	CEH
Anlong	安龙县	Qianxinan	Guizhou	County		357,304	522328	ALG
Kaili	凯里市	Qiandongnan	Guizhou	City		478,642	522601	KLS
Huangping	黄平县	Qiandongnan	Guizhou	County		263,123	522622	HPN
Shibing	施秉县	Qiandongnan	Guizhou	County		130,490	522623	SBG
Sansui	三穗县	Qiandongnan	Guizhou	County		155,671	522624	SAS
Zhenyuan	镇远县	Qiandongnan	Guizhou	County		203,735	522625	ZYX
Cengong	岑巩县	Qiandongnan	Guizhou	County		162,008	522626	CGX
Tianzhu	天柱县	Qiandongnan	Guizhou	County		263,841	522627	TZU
Jinping	锦屏县	Qiandongnan	Guizhou	County		154,841	522628	JPX
Jianhe	剑河县	Qiandongnan	Guizhou	County		180,544	522629	JHE
Taijiang	台江县	Qiandongnan	Guizhou	County		112,236	522630	TJX
Liping	黎平县	Qiandongnan	Guizhou	County		391,110	522631	LIP
Rongjiang	榕江县	Qiandongnan	Guizhou	County		286,336	522632	RJG
Congjiang	从江县	Qiandongnan	Guizhou	County		290,845	522633	COJ
Leishan	雷山县	Qiandongnan	Guizhou	County		117,198	522634	LSA
Majiang	麻江县	Qiandongnan	Guizhou	County		167,596	522635	MAJ
Danzhai	丹寨县	Qiandongnan	Guizhou	County		122,410	522636	DZH
Duyun	都匀市	Qiannan	Guizhou	City		443,937	522701	DUY
Fuquan	福泉市	Qiannan	Guizhou	City		283,943	522702	FQN
Libo	荔波县	Qiannan	Guizhou	County		144,849	522722	LBO
Guiding	贵定县	Qiannan	Guizhou	County		231,015	522723	GDG
Weng'an	瓮安县	Qiannan	Guizhou	County		380,458	522725	WGA
Dushan	独山县	Qiannan	Guizhou	County		265,083	522726	DSX
Pingtang	平塘县	Qiannan	Guizhou	County		228,377	522727	PTG
Luodian	罗甸县	Qiannan	Guizhou	County		256,488	522728	LOD
Changshun	长顺县	Qiannan	Guizhou	County		190,931	522729	CSU
Longli	龙里县	Qiannan	Guizhou	County		180,683	522730	LLI
Huishui	惠水县	Qiannan	Guizhou	County		342,294	522731	HUS
Sandu Shui Autonomous County	三都水族自治县	Qiannan	Guizhou	Autonomous county (Shui)		283,103	522732	SDU
Xiuying District	秀英区	Haikou	Hainan	District	493.64	349,544	460105	XYH
Longhua District	龙华区	Haikou	Hainan	District	302.49	593,018	460106	LOH
Qiongshan District	琼山区	Haikou	Hainan	District	928.62	479,960	460107	QOS
Meilan District	美兰区	Haikou	Hainan	District	581.06	623,667	460108	MEL
Haitang District	海棠区	Sanya	Hainan	District	252.41	not established	460202	HTN
Jiyang District	吉阳区	Sanya	Hainan	District	372.61	not established	460203	JYV
Tianya District	天涯区	Sanya	Hainan	District	946.79	not established	460204	TYA
Yazhou District	崖州区	Sanya	Hainan	District	347	not established	460205	YZB
Xisha District	西沙区	Sansha	Hainan	District (Islands)	10.07	not established	460302	-
Nansha District	南沙区	Sansha	Hainan	District (Islands)	11	not established	460303	-
Danzhou City	儋州市	Directly administered	Hainan	City	3,394	932,362	460401	DNZ
Wuzhishan City	五指山市	Directly administered	Hainan	City	1,130.81	104,122	469001	WZN
Qionghai City	琼海市	Directly administered	Hainan	City	1,692	483,217	469002	QHA
Wenchang City	文昌市	Directly administered	Hainan	City	2,403	537,428	469005	WEC
Wanning City	万宁市	Directly administered	Hainan	City	1,883.5	545,597	469006	WNN
Dongfang City	东方市	Directly administered	Hainan	City	2,256	408309	469007	DFG
Ding'an County	定安县	Directly administered	Hainan	County	1,189	284,616	469021	DIA
Tunchang County	屯昌县	Directly administered	Hainan	County	1,231.5	256,931	469022	TCG
Chengmai County	澄迈县	Directly administered	Hainan	County	2,067.6	467,161	469023	CMA
Lingao County	临高县	Directly administered	Hainan	County	1,317	427,873	469024	LGO
Baisha Li Autonomous County	白沙黎族自治县	Directly administered	Hainan	Autonomous county (Li)	2,177	167,918	469025	BSX
Changjiang Li Autonomous County	昌江黎族自治县	Directly administered	Hainan	Autonomous county (Li)	1,617	223,839	469026	CJX
Ledong Li Autonomous County	乐东黎族自治县	Directly administered	Hainan	Autonomous county (Li)	2,745.4	458,876	469027	LED
Lingshui Li Autonomous County	陵水黎族自治县	Directly administered	Hainan	Autonomous county (Li)	1,128	32,046	469028	LSL
Baoting Li and Miao Autonomous County	保亭黎族苗族自治县	Directly administered	Hainan	Autonomous county (Li & Miao)	1,160.6	146,684	469029	BTG
Qiongzhong Li and Miao Autonomous County	琼中黎族苗族自治县	Directly administered	Hainan	Autonomous county (Li & Miao)	2,936	174,076	469030	QZG
Chang'an	长安区	Shijiazhuang	Hebei	District		479,801	130102	CAQ
Qiaoxi	桥西区	Shijiazhuang	Hebei	District		596,164	130104	QXQ
Xinhua	新华区	Shijiazhuang	Hebei	District		625,119	130105	XHK
Yuhua	裕华区	Shijiazhuang	Hebei	District		655,414	130108	YUH
Jingxingkuang	井陉矿区	Shijiazhuang	Hebei	District		95,170	130107	JXK
Jingxing(xian)	井陉县	Shijiazhuang	Hebei	County		309,882	130121	JXJ
Zhengding	正定县	Shijiazhuang	Hebei	County		466,807	130123	ZDJ
Luancheng	栾城区	Shijiazhuang	Hebei	District		328,933	130111	LCO
Xingtang	行唐县	Shijiazhuang	Hebei	County		406,353	130125	XTG
Lingshou	灵寿县	Shijiazhuang	Hebei	County		333,558	130126	LSO
Gaoyi	高邑县	Shijiazhuang	Hebei	County		186,478	130127	GYJ
Shenze	深泽县	Shijiazhuang	Hebei	County		250,264	130128	SZE
Zanhuang	赞皇县	Shijiazhuang	Hebei	County		244,799	130129	ZHG
Wuji	无极县	Shijiazhuang	Hebei	County		502,662	130130	WJI
Pingshan	平山县	Shijiazhuang	Hebei	County		433,429	130131	PSH
Yuanshi	元氏县	Shijiazhuang	Hebei	County		418,466	130132	YSI
Zhao(xian)	赵县	Shijiazhuang	Hebei	County		571,077	130133	ZAO
Xinji	辛集市	Shijiazhuang	Hebei	City		615,919	130181	XJS
Gaocheng	藁城区	Shijiazhuang	Hebei	District		775,110	130109	GCO
Jinzhou	晋州市	Shijiazhuang	Hebei	City		537,679	130183	JZJ
Xinle	新乐市	Shijiazhuang	Hebei	City		487,652	130184	XLE
Luquan	鹿泉区	Shijiazhuang	Hebei	District		432,936	130110	LQL
Lunan	路南区	Tangshan	Hebei	District		311,076	130202	LNB
Lubei	路北区	Tangshan	Hebei	District		743,504	130203	LBQ
Guye	古冶区	Tangshan	Hebei	District		358,461	130204	GYE
Kaiping	开平区	Tangshan	Hebei	District		262,571	130205	KPQ
Fengnan	丰南区	Tangshan	Hebei	District		541,352	130207	FNQ
Fengrun	丰润区	Tangshan	Hebei	District		916,092	130208	FRN
Caofeidian	曹妃甸区	Tangshan	Hebei	District		251,785	130209	CFD
Luanzhou	滦州市	Tangshan	Hebei	City		554315	130284	
Luannan	滦南县	Tangshan	Hebei	County		571,779	130224	LNJ
Laoting	乐亭县	Tangshan	Hebei	County		526,222	130225	LTJ
Qianxi	迁西县	Tangshan	Hebei	County		390,128	130227	QXX
Yutian	玉田县	Tangshan	Hebei	County		684,833	130229	YTJ
Zunhua	遵化市	Tangshan	Hebei	City		737,011	130281	ZNH
Qian'an	迁安市	Tangshan	Hebei	City		728,160	130283	QAS
Haigang	海港区	Qinhuangdao	Hebei	District		765,254	130302	HGG
Shanhaiguan	山海关区	Qinhuangdao	Hebei	District		178,769	130303	SHG
Beidaihe	北戴河区	Qinhuangdao	Hebei	District		85,647	130304	BDH
Qinglong Manchu Autonomous County	青龙满族自治县	Qinhuangdao	Hebei	Autonomous county (Manchu)		496,726	130321	QLM
Changli	昌黎县	Qinhuangdao	Hebei	County		559,697	130322	CGL
Funing	抚宁区	Qinhuangdao	Hebei	District		517,073	130305	FNU
Lulong	卢龙县	Qinhuangdao	Hebei	County		384,439	130324	LLG
Hanshan	邯山区	Handan	Hebei	District		385,626	130402	HHD
Congtai	丛台区	Handan	Hebei	District		363,778	130403	CTQ
Fuxing	复兴区	Handan	Hebei	District		192,023	130404	FXQ
Fengfengkuang	峰峰矿区	Handan	Hebei	District		503,911	130406	FFK
Linzhang	临漳县	Handan	Hebei	County		600,600	130423	LNZ
Cheng'an	成安县	Handan	Hebei	County		377,398	130424	CAJ
Daming	大名县	Handan	Hebei	County		767,035	130425	DMX
She(xian)	涉县	Handan	Hebei	County		413,057	130426	SEJ
Ci(xian)	磁县	Handan	Hebei	County		677,884	130427	CIX
Feixiang	肥乡区	Handan	Hebei	District		351,690	130407	FXA
Yongnian	永年区	Handan	Hebei	District		943,935	130408	YNO
Qiu(xian)	邱县	Handan	Hebei	County		227,578	130430	QIU
Jize	鸡泽县	Handan	Hebei	County		274,328	130431	JZE
Guangping	广平县	Handan	Hebei	County		268,993	130432	GPX
Guantao	馆陶县	Handan	Hebei	County		309,032	130433	GTO
Wei(xian)	魏县	Handan	Hebei	County		809,193	130434	WEI
Quzhou	曲周县	Handan	Hebei	County		427,610	130435	QZX
Wu'an	武安市	Handan	Hebei	City		819,000	130481	WUA
Xiangdu	襄都区	Xingtai	Hebei	District		269,603	130504	
Xindu	信都区	Xingtai	Hebei	District		400,551	130505	
Lincheng	临城县	Xingtai	Hebei	County		204,086	130522	LNC
Neiqiu	内丘县	Xingtai	Hebei	County		266,620	130523	NQU
Baixiang	柏乡县	Xingtai	Hebei	County		190,225	130524	BXG
Longyao	隆尧县	Xingtai	Hebei	County		506,552	130525	LYO
Renze	任泽区	Xingtai	Hebei	District		327,926	130506	
Nanhe	南和区	Xingtai	Hebei	District		325,332	130507	
Ningjin	宁晋县	Xingtai	Hebei	County		764,828	130528	NJN
Julu	巨鹿县	Xingtai	Hebei	County		374,634	130529	JLU
Xinhe	新河县	Xingtai	Hebei	County		169,858	130530	XHJ
Guangzong	广宗县	Xingtai	Hebei	County		283,851	130531	GZJ
Pingxiang	平乡县	Xingtai	Hebei	County		300,029	130532	PXX
Wei(xian)	威县	Xingtai	Hebei	County		556,624	130533	WEX
Qinghe	清河县	Xingtai	Hebei	County		386,231	130534	QHE
Linxi	临西县	Xingtai	Hebei	County		343,384	130535	LXI
Nangong	南宫市	Xingtai	Hebei	City		469,030	130581	NGO
Shahe	沙河市	Xingtai	Hebei	City		498,416	130582	SHS
Jingxiu	竟秀区	Baoding	Hebei	District		482,768	130602	JXB
Lianchi	莲池区	Baoding	Hebei	District		-	130606	LCV
Mancheng	满城区	Baoding	Hebei	District		387,307	130607	MCG
Qingyuan	清苑区	Baoding	Hebei	District		631,659	130608	QYB
Laishui	涞水县	Baoding	Hebei	County		339,063	130623	LSM
Fuping	阜平县	Baoding	Hebei	County		295,764	130624	FUP
Xushui	徐水区	Baoding	Hebei	District		563,030	130609	XSC
Dingxing	定兴县	Baoding	Hebei	County		517,873	130626	DXG
Tang(xian)	唐县	Baoding	Hebei	County		529,066	130627	TAG
Gaoyang	高阳县	Baoding	Hebei	County		345,160	130628	GAY
Rongcheng	容城县	Baoding	Hebei	County		258,179	130629	RCX
Laiyuan	涞源县	Baoding	Hebei	County		260,678	130630	LIY
Wangdu	望都县	Baoding	Hebei	County		250,014	130631	WDU
Anxin	安新县	Baoding	Hebei	County		437,378	130632	AXX
Yi(xian)	易县	Baoding	Hebei	County		537,564	130633	YII
Quyang	曲阳县	Baoding	Hebei	County		588,559	130634	QUY
Li(xian)	蠡县	Baoding	Hebei	County		505,574	130635	LXJ
Shunping	顺平县	Baoding	Hebei	County		295,764	130636	SPI
Boye	博野县	Baoding	Hebei	County		245,504	130637	BYE
Xiong(xian)	雄县	Baoding	Hebei	County		359,506	130638	XOX
Zhuozhou	涿州市	Baoding	Hebei	City		603,535	130681	ZZO
Dingzhou	定州市	Baoding	Hebei	City		1,165,182	130682	DZO
Anguo	安国市	Baoding	Hebei	City		370,314	130683	AGO
Gaobeidian	高碑店市	Baoding	Hebei	City		640,280	130684	GBD
Qiaodong	桥东区	Zhangjiakou	Hebei	District		339,372	130702	QDZ
Qiaoxi	桥西区	Zhangjiakou	Hebei	District		287,900	130703	QXI
Xuanhua	宣化区	Zhangjiakou	Hebei	District		370,569	130705	XHZ
Xiahuayuan	下花园区	Zhangjiakou	Hebei	District		62,764	130706	XHY
Zhangbei	张北县	Zhangjiakou	Hebei	County		318,669	130722	ZGB
Kangbao	康保县	Zhangjiakou	Hebei	County		204,975	130723	KBO
Guyuan	沽源县	Zhangjiakou	Hebei	County		174,619	130724	GUY
Shangyi	尚义县	Zhangjiakou	Hebei	County		151,398	130725	SYK
Yu(xian)	蔚县	Zhangjiakou	Hebei	County		450,236	130726	YXJ
Yangyuan	阳原县	Zhangjiakou	Hebei	County		258,086	130727	YYN
Huai'an	怀安县	Zhangjiakou	Hebei	County		210,914	130728	HAX
Wanquan	万全区	Zhangjiakou	Hebei	District		211,706	130707	WQW
Huailai	怀来县	Zhangjiakou	Hebei	County		352,307	130730	HLA
Zhuolu	涿鹿县	Zhangjiakou	Hebei	County		333,932	130731	ZLU
Chicheng	赤城县	Zhangjiakou	Hebei	County		238,169	130732	CCX
Chongli	崇礼区	Zhangjiakou	Hebei	District		106,122	130708	CHL
Shuangqiao	双桥区	Chengde	Hebei	District		424,897	130802	SQO
Shuangluan	双滦区	Chengde	Hebei	District		146,878	130803	SLQ
Yingshouyingzikuang	鹰手营子矿区	Chengde	Hebei	District		62,454	130804	YSY
Chengde	承德县	Chengde	Hebei	County		388,554	130821	CDX
Xinglong	兴隆县	Chengde	Hebei	County		314,730	130822	XLJ
Pingquan	平泉市	Chengde	Hebei	City		446,939	130881	PQS
Luanping	滦平县	Chengde	Hebei	County		287,986	130824	LUP
Longhua	隆化县	Chengde	Hebei	County		372,030	130825	LHJ
Fengning Manchu Autonomous County	丰宁满族自治县	Chengde	Hebei	Autonomous county (Manchu)		357,029	130826	FNJ
Kuancheng Manchu Autonomous County	宽城满族自治县	Chengde	Hebei	Autonomous county (Manchu)		250,304	130827	KCX
Weichang Manchu and Mongol Autonomous County	围场满族蒙古族自治县	Chengde	Hebei	Autonomous county (Manchu & Mongol)		421,400	130828	WCJ
Xinhua	新华区	Cangzhou	Hebei	District		228,340	130902	XHF
Yunhe	运河区	Cangzhou	Hebei	District		308,453	130903	YHC
Cang(xian)	沧县	Cangzhou	Hebei	County		669,019	130921	CAG
Qing(xian)	青县	Cangzhou	Hebei	County		402,137	130922	QIG
Dongguang	东光县	Cangzhou	Hebei	County		356,501	130923	DGU
Haixing	海兴县	Cangzhou	Hebei	County		201,538	130924	HXG
Yanshan	盐山县	Cangzhou	Hebei	County		436,811	130925	YNS
Suning	肃宁县	Cangzhou	Hebei	County		334,639	130926	SNG
Nanpi	南皮县	Cangzhou	Hebei	County		366,231	130927	NPI
Wuqiao	吴桥县	Cangzhou	Hebei	County		282,410	130928	WUQ
Xian(xian)	献县	Cangzhou	Hebei	County		579,830	130929	XXN
Mengcun Hui Autonomous County	孟村回族自治县	Cangzhou	Hebei	Autonomous county (Hui)		202,571	130930	MCN
Botou	泊头市	Cangzhou	Hebei	City		584,308	130981	BOT
Renqiu	任丘市	Cangzhou	Hebei	City		822,454	130982	RQS
Huanghua	黄骅市	Cangzhou	Hebei	City		548,506	130983	HHJ
Hejian	河间市	Cangzhou	Hebei	City		810,305	130984	HJN
Anci	安次区	Langfang	Hebei	District		367,670	131002	ACI
Guangyang	广阳区	Langfang	Hebei	District		500,396	131003	GYQ
Gu'an	固安县	Langfang	Hebei	County		418,689	131022	GUA
Yongqing	永清县	Langfang	Hebei	County		356,481	131023	YQG
Xianghe	香河县	Langfang	Hebei	County		343,372	131024	XGH
Dacheng	大城县	Langfang	Hebei	County		477,773	131025	DCJ
Wen'an	文安县	Langfang	Hebei	County		500,967	131026	WEA
Dachang Hui Autonomous County	大厂回族自治县	Langfang	Hebei	Autonomous county (Hui)		118,474	131028	DCG
Bazhou	霸州市	Langfang	Hebei	City		622,975	131081	BZO
Sanhe	三河市	Langfang	Hebei	City		652,042	131082	SNH
Taocheng	桃城区	Hengshui	Hebei	District		522,147	131102	TOC
Zaoqiang	枣强县	Hengshui	Hebei	County		394,469	131121	ZQJ
Wuyi	武邑县	Hengshui	Hebei	County		315,693	131122	WYI
Wuqiang	武强县	Hengshui	Hebei	County		214,549	131123	WQG
Raoyang	饶阳县	Hengshui	Hebei	County		280,498	131124	RYG
Anping	安平县	Hengshui	Hebei	County		328,512	131125	APG
Gucheng	故城县	Hengshui	Hebei	County		487,025	131126	GCE
Jing(xian)	景县	Hengshui	Hebei	County		528,693	131127	JIG
Fucheng	阜城县	Hengshui	Hebei	County		341,087	131128	FCE
Jizhou	冀州区	Hengshui	Hebei	District		362,013	131103	JZA
Shenzhou	深州市	Hengshui	Hebei	City		566,087	131182	SNZ
Daoli	道里区	Harbin	Heilongjiang	District		923,762	230102	DLH
Nangang	南岗区	Harbin	Heilongjiang	District		1,343,857	230103	NGQ
Daowai	道外区	Harbin	Heilongjiang	District		906,421	230104	DWQ
Xiangfang	香坊区	Harbin	Heilongjiang	District		916,408	230110	XFQ
Pingfang	平房区	Harbin	Heilongjiang	District		190,253	230108	PFQ
Songbei	松北区	Harbin	Heilongjiang	District		236,848	230109	SBU
Hulan	呼兰区	Harbin	Heilongjiang	District		764,534	230111	HLH
Acheng	阿城区	Harbin	Heilongjiang	District		596,856	230112	ACQ
Shuangcheng	双城区	Harbin	Heilongjiang	District		825,634	230113	SCA
Yilan	依兰县	Harbin	Heilongjiang	County		388,319	230123	YLH
Fangzheng	方正县	Harbin	Heilongjiang	County		203,853	230124	FZH
Bin(xian)	宾县	Harbin	Heilongjiang	County		551,271	230125	BNX
Bayan	巴彦县	Harbin	Heilongjiang	County		590,555	230126	BYH
Tonghe	通河县	Harbin	Heilongjiang	County		210,650	230128	TOH
Mulan	木兰县	Harbin	Heilongjiang	County		277,685	230127	MUL
Yanshou	延寿县	Harbin	Heilongjiang	County		242,455	230129	YSU
Shangzhi	尚志市	Harbin	Heilongjiang	City		585,386	230183	SZI
Wuchang	五常市	Harbin	Heilongjiang	City		881,224	230184	WCA
Longsha	龙沙区	Qiqihar	Heilongjiang	District		354,987	230202	LQQ
Jianhua	建华区	Qiqihar	Heilongjiang	District		292,579	230203	JHQ
Tiefeng	铁峰区	Qiqihar	Heilongjiang	District		331,951	230204	TFQ
Ang'angxi	昂昂溪区	Qiqihar	Heilongjiang	District		80,109	230205	AAX
Fularji	富拉尔基区	Qiqihar	Heilongjiang	District		256,159	230206	HUE
Nianzishan	碾子山区	Qiqihar	Heilongjiang	District		72,151	230207	NZS
Meilisi Daur	梅里斯达斡尔族区	Qiqihar	Heilongjiang	District		165,852	230208	MLS
Longjiang	龙江县	Qiqihar	Heilongjiang	County		572,764	230221	LGJ
Yi'an	依安县	Qiqihar	Heilongjiang	County		480,035	230223	YAN
Tailai	泰来县	Qiqihar	Heilongjiang	County		302,027	230224	TLA
Gannan	甘南县	Qiqihar	Heilongjiang	County		368,734	230225	GNX
Fuyu	富裕县	Qiqihar	Heilongjiang	County		276,537	230227	FYX
Keshan	克山县	Qiqihar	Heilongjiang	County		403,175	230229	KSN
Kedong	克东县	Qiqihar	Heilongjiang	County		264,285	230230	KDO
Baiquan	拜泉县	Qiqihar	Heilongjiang	County		519,766	230231	BQN
Nehe	讷河市	Qiqihar	Heilongjiang	City		625,892	230281	NEH
Jiguan	鸡冠区	Jixi	Heilongjiang	District		365,376	230302	JGU
Hengshan	恒山区	Jixi	Heilongjiang	District		160,185	230303	HSD
Didao	滴道区	Jixi	Heilongjiang	District		103,646	230304	DDO
Lishu	梨树区	Jixi	Heilongjiang	District		76,361	230305	LJX
Chengzihe	城子河区	Jixi	Heilongjiang	District		127,290	230306	CZH
Mashan	麻山区	Jixi	Heilongjiang	District		30,097	230307	MSN
Jidong	鸡东县	Jixi	Heilongjiang	County		273,871	230321	JID
Hulin	虎林市	Jixi	Heilongjiang	City		317,884	230381	HUL
Mishan	密山市	Jixi	Heilongjiang	City		407,451	230382	MIS
Xiangyang	向阳区	Hegang	Heilongjiang	District		110,916	230402	XYZ
Gongnong	工农区	Hegang	Heilongjiang	District		140,070	230403	GNH
Nanshan	南山区	Hegang	Heilongjiang	District		119,047	230404	NSQ
Xing'an	兴安区	Hegang	Heilongjiang	District		74,396	230405	XAH
Dongshan	东山区	Hegang	Heilongjiang	District		175,239	230406	DSA
Xingshan	兴山区	Hegang	Heilongjiang	District		44,803	230407	XSQ
Luobei	萝北县	Hegang	Heilongjiang	County		220,131	230421	LUB
Suibin	绥滨县	Hegang	Heilongjiang	County		174,063	230422	SBN
Jianshan	尖山区	Shuangyashan	Heilongjiang	District		221,767	230502	JSQ
Lingdong	岭东区	Shuangyashan	Heilongjiang	District		81,882	230503	LDQ
Sifangtai	四方台区	Shuangyashan	Heilongjiang	District		67,704	230505	SFT
Baoshan	宝山区	Shuangyashan	Heilongjiang	District		128,153	230506	BSQ
Jixian	集贤县	Shuangyashan	Heilongjiang	County		319,893	230521	JXH
Youyi	友谊县	Shuangyashan	Heilongjiang	County		123,435	230522	YYI
Baoqing	宝清县	Shuangyashan	Heilongjiang	County		419,708	230523	BQG
Raohe	饶河县	Shuangyashan	Heilongjiang	County		141,884	230524	ROH
Sartu	萨尔图区	Daqing	Heilongjiang	District		328,808	230602	SAI
Longfeng	龙凤区	Daqing	Heilongjiang	District		352,404	230603	LFQ
Ranghulu	让胡路区	Daqing	Heilongjiang	District		564,534	230604	RHL
Honggang	红岗区	Daqing	Heilongjiang	District		169,522	230605	HGD
Datong	大同区	Daqing	Heilongjiang	District		234,557	230606	DTD
Zhaozhou	肇州县	Daqing	Heilongjiang	County		387,463	230621	ZAZ
Zhaoyuan	肇源县	Daqing	Heilongjiang	County		388,828	230622	ZYH
Lindian	林甸县	Daqing	Heilongjiang	County		244,578	230623	LDN
Dorbod	杜尔伯特县	Daqing	Heilongjiang	Autonomous county (Mongol)		233,838	230624	DOM
Nancha	南岔县	Yichun	Heilongjiang	District		118,060	230725	
Youhao	友好区	Yichun	Heilongjiang	District		53,409	230704	YOH
Daqingshan	大箐山县	Yichun	Heilongjiang	County		32,256	230726	
Jiayin	嘉荫县	Yichun	Heilongjiang	County		68,566	230722	JAY
Tieli	铁力市	Yichun	Heilongjiang	City		350,358	230781	TEL
Yimei	伊美区	Yichun	Heilongjiang	District			230717	
Wucui	乌翠区	Yichun	Heilongjiang	District			230718	
Jinlin	金林区	Yichun	Heilongjiang	District			230719	
Tangwang	汤旺县	Yichun	Heilongjiang	County			230723	
Fenglin	丰林县	Yichun	Heilongjiang	County			230724	
Xiangyang	向阳区	Jiamusi	Heilongjiang	District		233,855	230803	XYQ
Qianjin	前进区	Jiamusi	Heilongjiang	District		171,530	230804	QJQ
Dongfeng	东风区	Jiamusi	Heilongjiang	District		161,740	230805	DFQ
Jiao(qu)	郊区	Jiamusi	Heilongjiang	District		314,586	230811	JQJ
Huanan	桦南县	Jiamusi	Heilongjiang	County		468,698	230822	HNH
Huachuan	桦川县	Jiamusi	Heilongjiang	County		202,827	230826	HCN
Tangyuan	汤原县	Jiamusi	Heilongjiang	County		255,211	230828	TYX
Fuyuan	抚远市	Jiamusi	Heilongjiang	City		126,694	230883	FYF
Tongjiang	同江市	Jiamusi	Heilongjiang	City		179,791	230881	TOJ
Fujin	富锦市	Jiamusi	Heilongjiang	City		437,165	230882	FUJ
Xinxing	新兴区	Qitaihe	Heilongjiang	District		236,768	230902	XXQ
Taoshan	桃山区	Qitaihe	Heilongjiang	District		230,293	230903	TSC
Qiezihe	茄子河区	Qitaihe	Heilongjiang	District		153,874	230904	QZI
Boli	勃利县	Qitaihe	Heilongjiang	County		299,484	230921	BLI
Dong'an	东安区	Mudanjiang	Heilongjiang	District		200,160	231002	DGA
Yangming	阳明区	Mudanjiang	Heilongjiang	District		240,214	231003	YMQ
Aimin	爱民区	Mudanjiang	Heilongjiang	District		275,289	231004	AMQ
Xi'an	西安区	Mudanjiang	Heilongjiang	District		249,491	231005	XAQ
Dongning	东宁市	Mudanjiang	Heilongjiang	City		200,716	231086	DNA
Linkou	林口县	Mudanjiang	Heilongjiang	County		368,956	231025	LKO
Suifenhe	绥芬河市	Mudanjiang	Heilongjiang	City		132,315	231081	SFE
Hailin	海林市	Mudanjiang	Heilongjiang	City		400,859	231083	HLS
Ning'an	宁安市	Mudanjiang	Heilongjiang	City		437,452	231084	NAI
Muling	穆棱市	Mudanjiang	Heilongjiang	City		293,271	231085	MLG
Aihui District	瑷珲区	Heihe	Heilongjiang	District	14,372.54	211,313	231102	AHQ
Xunke County	逊克县	Heihe	Heilongjiang	County	17,344	101,411	231123	NJH
Sunwu County	孙吴县	Heihe	Heilongjiang	County	4,313.26	102,821	231124	XUK
Bei'an City	北安市	Heihe	Heilongjiang	City	7,192.99	436,444	231181	SUW
Wudalianchi City	五大连池市	Heihe	Heilongjiang	City	8,745.01	326,390	231182	BAS
Nenjiang City	嫩江市	Heihe	Heilongjiang	City	15,360	495,519	231183	WDL
Beilin District	北林区	Suihua	Heilongjiang	District	2,753.6	877,682	231202	BEL
Wangkui County	望奎县	Suihua	Heilongjiang	County	2,313.78	428,760	231221	WKI
Lanxi County	兰西县	Suihua	Heilongjiang	County	2,499.35	454,526	231222	LXT
Qinggang County	青冈县	Suihua	Heilongjiang	County	2,684.71	474,553	231223	QGG
Qing'an County	庆安县	Suihua	Heilongjiang	County	5,468.7	382,416	231224	QAN
Mingshui County	明水县	Suihua	Heilongjiang	County	2,305.46	320,985	231225	MSU
Suiling County	绥棱县	Suihua	Heilongjiang	County	4,350.25	331,705	231226	SLG
Anda City	安达市	Suihua	Heilongjiang	City	3,586.3	472,716	231281	ADA
Zhaodong City	肇东市	Suihua	Heilongjiang	City	4,331.96	903,171	231282	ZDS
Hailun City	海伦市	Suihua	Heilongjiang	City	4,667	769,925	231283	HLU
Jiagedaqi District	加格达奇行政区	Daxing'anling	Heilongjiang	District	1,587	154,363	232700	-
Songling District	松岭行政区	Daxing'anling	Heilongjiang	District	7,408	33,555	232700	-
Xinlin District	新林行政区	Daxing'anling	Heilongjiang	District	8,700	50,859	232700	-
Huzhong District	呼中行政区	Daxing'anling	Heilongjiang	District	9,400	45,039	232700	-
Mohe City	漠河市	Daxing'anling	Heilongjiang	City	18,233	83,414	232701	-
Huma County	呼玛县	Daxing'anling	Heilongjiang	County	14,285	51,861	232721	HUM
Tahe County	塔河县	Daxing'anling	Heilongjiang	County	14,103	92,473	232722	TAH
Zhongyuan	中原区	Zhengzhou	Henan	District		905,430	410102	ZYQ
Erqi	二七区	Zhengzhou	Henan	District		712,597	410103	EQQ
Guancheng	管城回族区	Zhengzhou	Henan	District		645,888	410104	GCH
Jinshui	金水区	Zhengzhou	Henan	District		1,588,611	410105	JSU
Shangjie	上街区	Zhengzhou	Henan	District		131,540	410106	SJE
Huiji	惠济区	Zhengzhou	Henan	District		269,561	410108	HJU
Zhongmu	中牟县	Zhengzhou	Henan	County		727,389	410122	ZMU
Gongyi	巩义市	Zhengzhou	Henan	City		807,857	410181	GYI
Xingyang	荥阳市	Zhengzhou	Henan	City		613,761	410182	XYK
Xinmi	新密市	Zhengzhou	Henan	City		797,200	410183	XMI
Xinzheng	新郑市	Zhengzhou	Henan	City		758,079	410184	XZG
Dengfeng	登封市	Zhengzhou	Henan	City		668,592	410185	DFY
Longting	龙亭区	Kaifeng	Henan	District		127,777	410202	LTK
Shunhe	顺河回族区	Kaifeng	Henan	District		232,280	410203	SHR
Gulou	鼓楼区	Kaifeng	Henan	District		143,165	410204	GLK
Yuwangtai	禹王台区	Kaifeng	Henan	District		130,595	410205	YWT
Qi(xian)	祥符区	Kaifeng	Henan	County		956,465	410212	XFH
Tongxu	杞县	Kaifeng	Henan	County		567,457	410221	QIX
Weishi	通许县	Kaifeng	Henan	County		879,651	410222	TXY
Xiangfu	尉氏县	Kaifeng	Henan	District		698,751	410223	WSI
Lankao	兰考县	Kaifeng	Henan	County		677,778	410225	LKA
Laocheng	老城区	Luoyang	Henan	District		163,165	410302	LLY
Xigong	西工区	Luoyang	Henan	District		372,917	410303	XGL
Chanhe	瀍河回族区	Luoyang	Henan	District		177,927	410304	CHH
Jianxi	涧西区	Luoyang	Henan	District		619,178	410305	JXL
Luolong	洛龙区	Luoyang	Henan	District		523,690	410311	LLQ
Mengjin	孟津区	Luoyang	Henan	District		414,609	410308	MGQ
Xin'an	新安县	Luoyang	Henan	County		470,166	410323	XAX
Luanchuan	栾川县	Luoyang	Henan	County		342,823	410324	LCK
Song(xian)	嵩县	Luoyang	Henan	County		507,013	410325	SON
Ruyang	汝阳县	Luoyang	Henan	County		407,981	410326	RUY
Yiyang	宜阳县	Luoyang	Henan	County		636,447	410327	YYY
Luoning	洛宁县	Luoyang	Henan	County		421,233	410328	LNI
Yichuan	伊川县	Luoyang	Henan	County		756,616	410329	YCZ
Yanshi	偃师区	Luoyang	Henan	District		666,650	410307	YST
Xinhua	新华区	Pingdingshan	Henan	District		389842	410402	XHP
Weidong	卫东区	Pingdingshan	Henan	District		302,582	410403	WDG
Shilong	石龙区	Pingdingshan	Henan	District		54,909	410404	SIL
Zhanhe	湛河区	Pingdingshan	Henan	District		286,642	410411	ZHQ
Baofeng	宝丰县	Pingdingshan	Henan	County		490,236	410421	BFG
Ye(xian)	叶县	Pingdingshan	Henan	County		777,150	410422	YEX
Lushan	鲁山县	Pingdingshan	Henan	County		789,845	410423	LUS
Jia(xian)	郏县	Pingdingshan	Henan	County		571,484	410425	JXY
Wugang	舞钢市	Pingdingshan	Henan	City		313,807	410481	WGY
Ruzhou	汝州市	Pingdingshan	Henan	City		927,870	410482	RZO
Wenfeng	文峰区	Anyang	Henan	District		442,854	410502	WFQ
Beiguan	北关区	Anyang	Henan	District		245,608	410503	BGQ
Yindu	殷都区	Anyang	Henan	District		243,858	410505	YND
Long'an	龙安区	Anyang	Henan	District		214,441	410506	LAQ
Anyang	安阳县	Anyang	Henan	County		848,999	410522	AYX
Tangyin	汤阴县	Anyang	Henan	County		430,773	410523	TYI
Hua(xian)	滑县	Anyang	Henan	County		1,263,203	410526	HUA
Neihuang	内黄县	Anyang	Henan	County		693,451	410527	NHG
Linzhou	林州市	Anyang	Henan	City		789,647	410581	LZY
Heshan	鹤山区	Hebi	Henan	District		131,413	410602	HSF
Shancheng	山城区	Hebi	Henan	District		230,952	410603	SCB
Qibin	淇滨区	Hebi	Henan	District		272,313	410611	QBN
Xun(xian)	浚县	Hebi	Henan	County		665,292	410621	XUX
Qi(xian)	淇县	Hebi	Henan	County		269,130	410622	QXY
Hongqi	红旗区	Xinxiang	Henan	District		391,265	410702	HQQ
Weibin	卫滨区	Xinxiang	Henan	District		193,493	410703	WEQ
Fengquan	凤泉区	Xinxiang	Henan	District		144,289	410704	FQQ
Muye	牧野区	Xinxiang	Henan	District		317,973	410711	MYQ
Xinxiang	新乡县	Xinxiang	Henan	County		339918	410721	XXX
Huojia	获嘉县	Xinxiang	Henan	County		402,922	410724	HOJ
Yuanyang	原阳县	Xinxiang	Henan	County		659,335	410725	YYA
Yanjin	延津县	Xinxiang	Henan	County		469,248	410726	YJN
Fengqiu	封丘县	Xinxiang	Henan	County		743,786	410727	FQU
Changyuan	长垣市	Xinxiang	Henan	City		809,479	410783	HXS
Weihui	卫辉市	Xinxiang	Henan	City		495,710	410781	CYU
Huixian	辉县市	Xinxiang	Henan	City		740,383	410782	WHS
Jiefang	解放区	Jiaozuo	Henan	District		295,675	410802	JFQ
Zhongzhan	中站区	Jiaozuo	Henan	District		106,057	410803	ZZQ
Macun	马村区	Jiaozuo	Henan	District		139,524	410804	MCQ
Shanyang	山阳区	Jiaozuo	Henan	District		324,100	410811	SYC
Xiuwu	修武县	Jiaozuo	Henan	County		287,794	410821	XUW
Bo'ai	博爱县	Jiaozuo	Henan	County		436,289	410822	BOA
Wuzhi	武陟县	Jiaozuo	Henan	County		713,896	410823	WZI
Wen(xian)	温县	Jiaozuo	Henan	County		421,767	410825	WEN
Qinyang	沁阳市	Jiaozuo	Henan	City		447,670	410882	QYS
Mengzhou	孟州市	Jiaozuo	Henan	City		367,088	410883	MZO
Hualong	华龙区	Puyang	Henan	District		655,630	410902	HAL
Qingfeng	清丰县	Puyang	Henan	County		635,880	410922	QFG
Nanle	南乐县	Puyang	Henan	County		458,450	410923	NLE
Fan(xian)	范县	Puyang	Henan	County		469,840	410926	FAX
Taiqian	台前县	Puyang	Henan	County		332,100	410927	TQN
Puyang	濮阳县	Puyang	Henan	County		104,650	410928	PUY
Weidu	魏都区	Xuchang	Henan	District		498,058	411002	WED
Jian'an	建安区	Xuchang	Henan	District		767,396	411003	JAN
Yanling	鄢陵县	Xuchang	Henan	County		551,575	411024	YLY
Xiangcheng	襄城县	Xuchang	Henan	County		671,270	411025	XAC
Yuzhou	禹州市	Xuchang	Henan	City		1,131,819	411081	YUZ
Changge	长葛市	Xuchang	Henan	City		687,081	411082	CGE
Yuanhui	源汇区	Luohe	Henan	District		323,935	411102	YHI
Yancheng	郾城区	Luohe	Henan	District		493,648	411103	YNC
Shaoling	召陵区	Luohe	Henan	District		477,308	411104	SOL
Wuyang	舞阳县	Luohe	Henan	County		538,412	411121	WYG
Linying	临颍县	Luohe	Henan	County		710,800	411122	LNY
Hubin	湖滨区	Sanmenxia	Henan	District		325,608	411202	HBI
Mianchi	渑池县	Sanmenxia	Henan	County		346,411	411221	MCI
Shanzhou	陕州区	Sanmenxia	Henan	District		343,657	411203	SZC
Lushi	卢氏县	Sanmenxia	Henan	County		352,425	411224	LUU
Yima	义马市	Sanmenxia	Henan	City		721,001	411281	YMA
Lingbao	灵宝市	Sanmenxia	Henan	City			411282	LBS
Wancheng	宛城区	Nanyang	Henan	District		887,215	411302	WCN
Wolong	卧龙区	Nanyang	Henan	District		924,517	411303	WOL
Nanzhao	南召县	Nanyang	Henan	County		557,117	411321	NZO
Fangcheng	方城县	Nanyang	Henan	County		922,404	411322	FCX
Xixia	西峡县	Nanyang	Henan	County		444,383	411323	XXY
Zhenping	镇平县	Nanyang	Henan	County		859,506	411324	ZPX
Neixiang	内乡县	Nanyang	Henan	County		575,169	411325	NXG
Xichuan	淅川县	Nanyang	Henan	County		685,637	411326	XCY
Sheqi	社旗县	Nanyang	Henan	County		633,742	411327	SEQ
Tanghe	唐河县	Nanyang	Henan	County		1,282,174	411328	TGH
Xinye	新野县	Nanyang	Henan	County		629,166	411329	XYE
Tongbai	桐柏县	Nanyang	Henan	County		393,915	411330	TBX
Dengzhou	邓州市	Nanyang	Henan	City		1,468,061	411381	DGZ
Liangyuan	梁园区	Shangqiu	Henan	District		787,931	411402	LYY
Suiyang	睢阳区	Shangqiu	Henan	District		748,356	411403	SYA
Minquan	民权县	Shangqiu	Henan	County		703,379	411421	MQY
Sui(xian)	睢县	Shangqiu	Henan	County		711,088	411422	SUI
Ningling	宁陵县	Shangqiu	Henan	County		523,367	411423	NGL
Zhecheng	柘城县	Shangqiu	Henan	County		778,107	411424	ZHC
Yucheng	虞城县	Shangqiu	Henan	County		954,720	411425	YUC
Xiayi	夏邑县	Shangqiu	Henan	County		915,228	411426	XAY
Yongcheng	永城市	Shangqiu	Henan	City		1,240,296	411481	YOC
Shihe	浉河区	Xinyang	Henan	District		594,351	411502	SHU
Pingqiao	平桥区	Xinyang	Henan	District		635,608	411503	PQQ
Luoshan	罗山县	Xinyang	Henan	County		504,542	411521	LSE
Guangshan	光山县	Xinyang	Henan	County		585,314	411522	GSX
Xi(xian)	息县	Xinyang	Henan	County		275,285	411528	XIX
Shangcheng	商城县	Xinyang	Henan	County		495,491	411524	SCX
Gushi	固始县	Xinyang	Henan	County		1,023,857	411525	GSI
Huangchuan	潢川县	Xinyang	Henan	County		630,333	411526	HCU
Huaibin	淮滨县	Xinyang	Henan	County		570,156	411527	HBN
Xin(xian)	新县	Xinyang	Henan	County		793,746	411523	XXI
Chuanhui	川汇区	Zhoukou	Henan	District		505,139	411602	CIQ
Fugou	扶沟县	Zhoukou	Henan	County		625,776	411621	XIH
Xihua	西华县	Zhoukou	Henan	County		787,862	411622	SSU
Shangshui	商水县	Zhoukou	Henan	County		940,727	411623	SQU
Shenqiu	沈丘县	Zhoukou	Henan	County		983,516	411624	DNC
Dancheng	郸城县	Zhoukou	Henan	County		1,003,841	411625	HYG
Huaiyang	淮阳区	Zhoukou	Henan	District		1,089,621	411603	FUG
Taikang	太康县	Zhoukou	Henan	County		1,102,875	411627	TKG
Luyi	鹿邑县	Zhoukou	Henan	County		910,189	411628	LUY
Xiangcheng	项城市	Zhoukou	Henan	City		1,003,626	411681	XGC
Yicheng	驿城区	Zhumadian	Henan	District		721,678	411702	YEQ
Xiping	西平县	Zhumadian	Henan	County		700,103	411721	XIP
Shangcai	上蔡县	Zhumadian	Henan	County		1,084,133	411722	SGC
Pingyu	平舆县	Zhumadian	Henan	County		748,348	411723	PYX
Zhengyang	正阳县	Zhumadian	Henan	County		644,991	411724	ZGY
Queshan	确山县	Zhumadian	Henan	County		405,992	411725	QSA
Biyang	泌阳县	Zhumadian	Henan	County		810,353	411726	BYY
Runan	汝南县	Zhumadian	Henan	County		769,945	411727	RNN
Suiping	遂平县	Zhumadian	Henan	County		493,897	411728	SUP
Xincai	新蔡县	Zhumadian	Henan	County		851,304	411729	XNC
Jiyuan	济源市	Directly administered	Henan	City		675,710	419001	JYY
Jiang'an	江岸区	Wuhan	Hubei	District		895,635	420102	JAA
Jianghan	江汉区	Wuhan	Hubei	District		683,492	420103	JHN
Qiaokou	硚口区	Wuhan	Hubei	District		828,644	420104	QKQ
Hanyang	汉阳区	Wuhan	Hubei	District		792,183	420105	HYA
Wuchang	武昌区	Wuhan	Hubei	District		1,199,127	420106	WCQ
Qingshan	青山区	Wuhan	Hubei	District		485,375	420107	QSN
Hongshan	洪山区	Wuhan	Hubei	District		1,549,917	420111	HSQ
Dongxihu	东西湖区	Wuhan	Hubei	District		451,880	420112	DXH
Hannan	汉南区	Wuhan	Hubei	District		114,970	420113	HNQ
Caidian	蔡甸区	Wuhan	Hubei	District		410,888	420114	CDN
Jiangxia	江夏区	Wuhan	Hubei	District		644,835	420115	JXQ
Huangpi	黄陂区	Wuhan	Hubei	District		874,938	420116	HPI
Xinzhou	新洲区	Wuhan	Hubei	District		848,760	420117	XNZ
Huangshigang	黄石港区	Huangshi	Hubei	District		362611	420202	HSG
Xisaishan	西塞山区	Huangshi	Hubei	District		233,708	420203	XAI
Xialu	下陆区	Huangshi	Hubei	District		110,925	420204	XAL
Tieshan	铁山区	Huangshi	Hubei	District		57,327	420205	TSH
Yangxin	阳新县	Huangshi	Hubei	County		827,631	420222	YXE
Daye	大冶市	Huangshi	Hubei	City		837,116	420281	DYE
Maojian	茅箭区	Shiyan	Hubei	District		399,449	420302	MJN
Zhangwan	张湾区	Shiyan	Hubei	District		368,471	420303	ZWQ
Yunyang	郧阳区	Shiyan	Hubei	District		558,355	420304	YYH
Yunxi	郧西县	Shiyan	Hubei	County		447,484	420322	YNX
Zhushan	竹山县	Shiyan	Hubei	County		417,081	420323	ZHS
Zhuxi	竹溪县	Shiyan	Hubei	County		315,257	420324	ZXX
Fang(xian)	房县	Shiyan	Hubei	County		390,991	420325	FAG
Danjiangkou	丹江口市	Shiyan	Hubei	City		443,755	420381	DJK
Xiling	西陵区	Yichang	Hubei	District		512,074	420502	XLQ
Wujiagang	伍家岗区	Yichang	Hubei	District		214,194	420503	WJG
Dianjun	点军区	Yichang	Hubei	District		103,696	420504	DJN
Xiaoting	猇亭区	Yichang	Hubei	District		61,230	420505	XTQ
Yiling	夷陵区	Yichang	Hubei	District		520,186	420506	YIQ
Yuan'an	远安县	Yichang	Hubei	County		184,532	420525	YAX
Xingshan	兴山县	Yichang	Hubei	County		170,630	420526	XSX
Zigui	秭归县	Yichang	Hubei	County		367,107	420527	ZGI
Changyang Tujia Autonomous County	长阳土家族自治县	Yichang	Hubei	Autonomous county (Tujia)		388,228	420528	CYA
Wufeng Tujia Autonomous County	五峰土家族自治县	Yichang	Hubei	Autonomous county (Tujia)		188,923	420529	WFG
Yidu	宜都市	Yichang	Hubei	City		384,598	420581	YID
Dangyang	当阳市	Yichang	Hubei	City		468,293	420582	DYS
Zhijiang	枝江市	Yichang	Hubei	City		495,995	420583	ZIJ
Xiangcheng	襄城区	Xiangyang	Hubei	District		485,934	420602	XXF
Fancheng	樊城区	Xiangyang	Hubei	District		808,798	420606	FNC
Xiangzhou	襄州区	Xiangyang	Hubei	District		904,957	420607	XZA
Nanzhang	南漳县	Xiangyang	Hubei	County		533,661	420624	NZH
Gucheng	谷城县	Xiangyang	Hubei	County		523,607	420625	GUC
Baokang	保康县	Xiangyang	Hubei	County		254,597	420626	BKG
Laohekou	老河口市	Xiangyang	Hubei	City		471,482	420682	LHK
Zaoyang	枣阳市	Xiangyang	Hubei	City		1,004,741	420683	ZOY
Yicheng	宜城市	Xiangyang	Hubei	City		512,530	420684	YCW
Liangzihu	梁子湖区	Ezhou	Hubei	District		142,608	420702	LZI
Huarong	华容区	Ezhou	Hubei	District		237,333	420703	HRQ
Echeng	鄂城区	Ezhou	Hubei	District		668,731	420704	ECQ
Dongbao	东宝区	Jingmen	Hubei	District		360,984	420802	DBQ
Duodao	掇刀区	Jingmen	Hubei	District		271,970	420804	DOQ
Jingshan	京山市	Jingmen	Hubei	City		636,776	420882	
Shayang	沙洋县	Jingmen	Hubei	County		581,443	420822	SYF
Zhongxiang	钟祥市	Jingmen	Hubei	City		1,022,514	420881	ZXS
Xiaonan	孝南区	Xiaogan	Hubei	District		908,266	420902	XNA
Xiaochang	孝昌县	Xiaogan	Hubei	County		588,666	420921	XOC
Dawu	大悟县	Xiaogan	Hubei	County		614,902	420922	DWU
Yunmeng	云梦县	Xiaogan	Hubei	County		524,799	420923	YMX
Yingcheng	应城市	Xiaogan	Hubei	City		593,812	420981	YCG
Anlu	安陆市	Xiaogan	Hubei	City		568,590	420982	ALU
Hanchuan	汉川市	Xiaogan	Hubei	City		1,015,507	420984	HCH
Shashi	沙市区	Jingzhou	Hubei	District		600,330	421002	SSJ
Jingzhou	荆州区	Jingzhou	Hubei	District		553,756	421003	JZQ
Gong'an	公安县	Jingzhou	Hubei	County		881,128	421022	GGA
Jianli	监利市	Jingzhou	Hubei	City		1,162,770	421088	
Jiangling	江陵县	Jingzhou	Hubei	County		331,344	421024	JLX
Shishou	石首市	Jingzhou	Hubei	City		577,022	421081	SSO
Honghu	洪湖市	Jingzhou	Hubei	City		819,446	421083	HHU
Songzi	松滋市	Jingzhou	Hubei	City		765,911	421087	SZF
Huangzhou	黄州区	Huanggang	Hubei	District		366,769	421102	HZC
Tuanfeng	团风县	Huanggang	Hubei	County		338,613	421121	TFG
Hong'an	红安县	Huanggang	Hubei	County		602,156	421122	HGA
Luotian	罗田县	Huanggang	Hubei	County		544,650	421123	LTE
Yingshan	英山县	Huanggang	Hubei	County		357,296	421124	YSE
Xishui	浠水县	Huanggang	Hubei	County		872,650	421125	XSE
Qichun	蕲春县	Huanggang	Hubei	County		727,821	421126	QCN
Huangmei	黄梅县	Huanggang	Hubei	County		858,806	421127	HGM
Macheng	麻城市	Huanggang	Hubei	City		849,092	421181	MCS
Wuxue	武穴市	Huanggang	Hubei	City		644,219	421182	WXE
Xian'an	咸安区	Xianning	Hubei	District		512,517	421202	XAN
Jiayu	嘉鱼县	Xianning	Hubei	County		319,196	421221	JYX
Tongcheng	通城县	Xianning	Hubei	County		380,758	421222	TCX
Chongyang	崇阳县	Xianning	Hubei	County		410,623	421223	CGY
Tongshan	通山县	Xianning	Hubei	County		361,079	421224	TSA
Chibi	赤壁市	Xianning	Hubei	City		478,410	421281	CBI
Zengdu	曾都区	Suizhou	Hubei	District		618,582	421303	ZED
Sui(xian)	随县	Suizhou	Hubei	County		755,910	421321	SUA
Guangshui	广水市	Suizhou	Hubei	City		787,730	421381	GSS
Enshi	恩施市	Enshi	Hubei	City		749,609	422801	ESS
Lichuan	利川市	Enshi	Hubei	City		654,197	422802	LCE
Jianshi	建始县	Enshi	Hubei	County		411,936	422822	JSE
Badong	巴东县	Enshi	Hubei	County		420,798	422823	BDG
Xuan'en	宣恩县	Enshi	Hubei	County		310,390	422825	XEN
Xianfeng	咸丰县	Enshi	Hubei	County		300,648	422826	XFG
Laifeng	来凤县	Enshi	Hubei	County		242,920	422827	LFG
Hefeng	鹤峰县	Enshi	Hubei	County		199,796	422828	HEF
Xiantao	仙桃市	Directly administered	Hubei	City		1,175,085	429004	XNT
Qianjiang	潜江市	Directly administered	Hubei	City		946,277	429005	QNJ
Tianmen	天门市	Directly administered	Hubei	City		1,418,913	429006	TMS
Shennongjia	神农架林区	Directly administered	Hubei	Forestry District		76,140	429021	SNJ
Furong	芙蓉区	Changsha	Hunan	District		523,730	430102	FRQ
Tianxin	天心区	Changsha	Hunan	District		475,663	430103	TXQ
Yuelu	岳麓区	Changsha	Hunan	District		801,861	430104	YLU
Kaifu	开福区	Changsha	Hunan	District		567,373	430105	KFQ
Yuhua	雨花区	Changsha	Hunan	District		725,353	430111	YHA
Wangcheng	望城区	Changsha	Hunan	District		523,489	430112	WCE
Changsha	长沙县	Changsha	Hunan	County		979,665	430121	CSA
Ningxiang	宁乡市	Changsha	Hunan	County		1,168,056	430182	NXH
Liuyang	浏阳市	Changsha	Hunan	City		1,278,928	430181	LYS
Hetang	荷塘区	Zhuzhou	Hunan	District		309,006	430202	HTZ
Lusong	芦淞区	Zhuzhou	Hunan	District		248,021	430203	LZZ
Shifeng	石峰区	Zhuzhou	Hunan	District		282,975	430204	SFG
Tianyuan	天元区	Zhuzhou	Hunan	District		215,371	430211	TYQ
Lukou	渌口区	Zhuzhou	Hunan	District		383,570	430212	
You(xian)	攸县	Zhuzhou	Hunan	County		693,178	430223	YOU
Chaling	茶陵县	Zhuzhou	Hunan	County		575,303	430224	CAL
Yanling	炎陵县	Zhuzhou	Hunan	County		201,692	430225	YLX
Liling	醴陵市	Zhuzhou	Hunan	City		946,493	430281	LIL
Yuetang	岳塘区	Xiangtan	Hunan	District		501,348	430304	YTG
Yuhu	雨湖区	Xiangtan	Hunan	District		457,955	430302	YHU
Xiangtan	湘潭县	Xiangtan	Hunan	County		915,997	430321	XTX
Xiangxiang	湘乡市	Xiangtan	Hunan	City		787,216	430381	XXG
Shaoshan	韶山市	Xiangtan	Hunan	City		86,036	430382	SSN
Zhuhui	珠晖区	Hengyang	Hunan	District		332,463	430405	ZIQ
Yanfeng	雁峰区	Hengyang	Hunan	District		212,997	430406	YNQ
Shigu	石鼓区	Hengyang	Hunan	District		231,595	430407	SIG
Zhengxiang	蒸湘区	Hengyang	Hunan	District		298,461	430408	ZXU
Nanyue	南岳区	Hengyang	Hunan	District		59,650	430412	NYQ
Hengyang	衡阳县	Hengyang	Hunan	County		1,103,897	430421	HYO
Hengnan	衡南县	Hengyang	Hunan	County		953,608	430422	HNX
Hengshan	衡山县	Hengyang	Hunan	County		382,086	430423	HSH
Hengdong	衡东县	Hengyang	Hunan	County		629,725	430424	HED
Qidong	祁东县	Hengyang	Hunan	County		980,218	430426	QDX
Changning	常宁市	Hengyang	Hunan	City		1,150,241	430482	CNS
Leiyang	耒阳市	Hengyang	Hunan	City		806,521	430481	LEY
Shuangqing	双清区	Shaoyang	Hunan	District		307,980	430502	SGQ
Daxiang	大祥区	Shaoyang	Hunan	District		340,605	430503	DXS
Beita	北塔区	Shaoyang	Hunan	District		104,609	430511	BET
Shaodong	邵东市	Shaoyang	Hunan	City		896,625	430582	WGS
Xinshao	新邵县	Shaoyang	Hunan	County		743,073	430523	XSO
Shaoyang	邵阳县	Shaoyang	Hunan	County		915,600	430524	SYW
Longhui	隆回县	Shaoyang	Hunan	County		1,095,392	430525	LGH
Dongkou	洞口县	Shaoyang	Hunan	County		770,473	430527	DGK
Suining	绥宁县	Shaoyang	Hunan	County		351,139	430528	SNX
Xinning	新宁县	Shaoyang	Hunan	County		560,742	430529	XNI
Chengbu Miao Autonomous County	城步苗族自治县	Shaoyang	Hunan	Autonomous county (Miao)		250,633	430581	CBU
Wugang	武冈市	Shaoyang	Hunan	City		734,870	430581	CBU
Yueyanglou	岳阳楼区	Yueyang	Hunan	District		814,593	430602	YYL
Yunxi	云溪区	Yueyang	Hunan	District		176,872	430603	YXI
Junshan	君山区	Yueyang	Hunan	District		240,668	430611	JUS
Yueyang	岳阳县	Yueyang	Hunan	County		717,032	430621	YYX
Huarong	华容县	Yueyang	Hunan	County		709,098	430623	HRG
Xiangyin	湘阴县	Yueyang	Hunan	County		681,075	430624	XYN
Pingjiang	平江县	Yueyang	Hunan	County		947,774	430626	PJH
Miluo	汨罗市	Yueyang	Hunan	City		692,280	430681	MLU
Linxiang	临湘市	Yueyang	Hunan	City		498,519	430682	LXY
Wuling	武陵区	Changde	Hunan	District		620,973	430702	WLQ
Dingcheng	鼎城区	Changde	Hunan	District		837,563	430703	DCE
Anxiang	安乡县	Changde	Hunan	County		525,619	430721	AXG
Hanshou	汉寿县	Changde	Hunan	County		799,497	430722	HSO
Li(xian)	澧县	Changde	Hunan	County		827,021	430723	LXX
Linli	临澧县	Changde	Hunan	County		401,071	430724	LNL
Taoyuan	桃源县	Changde	Hunan	County		854,935	430725	TOY
Shimen	石门县	Changde	Hunan	County		599,475	430726	SHM
Jinshi	津市市	Changde	Hunan	City		251,064	430781	JSS
Yongding	永定区	Zhangjiajie	Hunan	District		441,333	430802	YDQ
Wulingyuan	武陵源区	Zhangjiajie	Hunan	District		52,712	430811	WLY
Cili	慈利县	Zhangjiajie	Hunan	County		601,977	430821	CLI
Sangzhi	桑植县	Zhangjiajie	Hunan	County		380,499	430822	SZT
Ziyang	资阳区	Yiyang	Hunan	District		410,542	430902	ZYC
Heshan	赫山区	Yiyang	Hunan	District		839,265	430903	HSY
Nan(xian)	南县	Yiyang	Hunan	County		725,562	430921	NXN
Taojiang	桃江县	Yiyang	Hunan	County		769,568	430922	TJG
Anhua	安化县	Yiyang	Hunan	County		901,043	430923	ANH
Yuanjiang	沅江市	Yiyang	Hunan	City		667,104	430981	YJS
Beihu	北湖区	Chenzhou	Hunan	District		420,531	431002	BHQ
Suxian	苏仙区	Chenzhou	Hunan	District		403,299	431003	SUX
Guiyang	桂阳县	Chenzhou	Hunan	County		695,918	431021	GYX
Yizhang	宜章县	Chenzhou	Hunan	County		579,565	431022	YZA
Yongxing	永兴县	Chenzhou	Hunan	County		572,960	431023	YXX
Jiahe	嘉禾县	Chenzhou	Hunan	County		296,017	431024	JAH
Linwu	临武县	Chenzhou	Hunan	County		331,871	431025	LWX
Rucheng	汝城县	Chenzhou	Hunan	County		330,254	431026	RCE
Guidong	桂东县	Chenzhou	Hunan	County		230,948	431027	GDO
Anren	安仁县	Chenzhou	Hunan	County		382,920	431028	ARN
Zixing	资兴市	Chenzhou	Hunan	City		337,495	431081	ZXG
Lingling	零陵区	Yongzhou	Hunan	District		528,637	431102	LIG
Lengshuitan	冷水滩区	Yongzhou	Hunan	District		479,144	431103	LST
Qiyang	祁阳市	Yongzhou	Hunan	City		853,197	431181	QIY
Dong'an	东安县	Yongzhou	Hunan	County		543,453	431122	DOA
Shuangpai	双牌县	Yongzhou	Hunan	County		163,274	431123	SPA
Dao(xian)	道县	Yongzhou	Hunan	County		605,799	431124	DAO
Jiangyong	江永县	Yongzhou	Hunan	County		232,599	431125	JYD
Ningyuan	宁远县	Yongzhou	Hunan	County		700,759	431126	NYN
Lanshan	蓝山县	Yongzhou	Hunan	County		332,940	431127	LNS
Xintian	新田县	Yongzhou	Hunan	County		329,906	431128	XTN
Jianghua Yao Autonomous County	江华瑶族自治县	Yongzhou	Hunan	Autonomous county (Yao)		410,527	431129	JHX
Hecheng	鹤城区	Huaihua	Hunan	District		552,622	431202	HCG
Hongjiang(qu)	洪江管理区	Huaihua	Hunan	District		64,960		
Zhongfang	中方县	Huaihua	Hunan	County		236,649	431221	ZFX
Yuanling	沅陵县	Huaihua	Hunan	County		582,582	431222	YNL
Chenxi	辰溪县	Huaihua	Hunan	County		453,565	431223	CXX
Xupu	溆浦县	Huaihua	Hunan	County		741,014	431224	XUP
Huitong	会同县	Huaihua	Hunan	County		318,686	431225	HTG
Mayang Miao Autonomous County	麻阳苗族自治县	Huaihua	Hunan	Autonomous county (Miao)		343,309	431226	MYX
Xinhuang Dong Autonomous County	新晃侗族自治县	Huaihua	Hunan	Autonomous county (Dong)		244,322	431227	XHD
Zhijiang Dong Autonomous County	芷江侗族自治县	Huaihua	Hunan	Autonomous county (Dong)		339,437	431228	ZJX
Jingzhou Miao and Dong Autonomous County	靖州苗族侗族自治县	Huaihua	Hunan	Autonomous county (Miao & Dong)		245,116	431229	JZO
Tongdao Dong Autonomous County	通道侗族自治县	Huaihua	Hunan	Autonomous county (Dong)		206,650	431230	TDD
Hongjiang(shi)	洪江市	Huaihua	Hunan	City		413,036	431281	HGJ
Louxing	娄星区	Loudi	Hunan	District		497,171	431302	LOX
Shuangfeng	双峰县	Loudi	Hunan	County		854,555	431321	SFX
Xinhua	新化县	Loudi	Hunan	County		1,110,910	431322	XNH
Lengshuijiang	冷水江市	Loudi	Hunan	City		327,279	431381	LSJ
Lianyuan	涟源市	Loudi	Hunan	City		995,712	431382	LYU
Jishou	吉首市	Xiangxi	Hunan	City		301,460	433101	JSO
Luxi	泸溪县	Xiangxi	Hunan	County		273,361	433122	LXW
Fenghuang	凤凰县	Xiangxi	Hunan	County		350,195	433123	FHX
Huayuan	花垣县	Xiangxi	Hunan	County		288,082	433124	HYH
Baojing	保靖县	Xiangxi	Hunan	County		277,379	433125	BJG
Guzhang	古丈县	Xiangxi	Hunan	County		126,756	433126	GZG
Yongshun	永顺县	Xiangxi	Hunan	County		428,373	433127	YSF
Longshan	龙山县	Xiangxi	Hunan	County		502,227	433130	LSR
Xincheng	新城区	Hohhot	Inner Mongolia	District		567,255	150102	XCN
Huimin	回民区	Hohhot	Inner Mongolia	District		394,555	150103	HMQ
Yuquan	玉泉区	Hohhot	Inner Mongolia	District		383,365	150104	YQN
Saihan	赛罕区	Hohhot	Inner Mongolia	District		635,599	150105	SAQ
Tumed Left	土默特左旗	Hohhot	Inner Mongolia	Banner		312,532	150121	TUZ
Togtoh	托克托县	Hohhot	Inner Mongolia	County		200,840	150122	TOG
Horinger	和林格尔县	Hohhot	Inner Mongolia	County		169,856	150123	HOR
Qingshuihe	清水河县	Hohhot	Inner Mongolia	County		93,887	150124	QSH
Wuchuan	武川县	Hohhot	Inner Mongolia	County		108,726	150125	WCX
Donghe	东河区	Baotou	Inner Mongolia	District		512,045	150202	DHE
Hondlon	昆都仑区	Baotou	Inner Mongolia	District		726,838	150203	HDB
Qingshan	青山区	Baotou	Inner Mongolia	District		481,216	150204	QSB
Shiguai	石拐区	Baotou	Inner Mongolia	District		35,805	150205	XIT
Bayan Obo	白云鄂博矿区	Baotou	Inner Mongolia	District		26,050	150206	BYK
Jiuyuan	九原区	Baotou	Inner Mongolia	District		195,831	150207	JYN
Tumed Right	土默特右旗	Baotou	Inner Mongolia	Banner		276,453	150221	TUY
Darhan Muminggan United	达尔罕茂明安 联合旗	Baotou	Inner Mongolia	Banner		101,486	150223	DML
Guyang	固阳县	Baotou	Inner Mongolia	County		175,574	150222	GYM
Haibowan	海勃湾区	Wuhai	Inner Mongolia	District		296,177	150302	HBW
Hainan	海南区	Wuhai	Inner Mongolia	District		103,355	150303	HNU
Wuda	乌达区	Wuhai	Inner Mongolia	District		133,370	150304	UDQ
Hongshan	红山区	Chifeng	Inner Mongolia	District		434,785	150402	HSZ
Yuanbaoshan	元宝山区	Chifeng	Inner Mongolia	District		325,170	150403	YBO
Songshan	松山区	Chifeng	Inner Mongolia	District		573,571	150404	SSQ
Ar Horqin	阿鲁科尔沁旗	Chifeng	Inner Mongolia	Banner		272,205	150421	AHO
Bairin Left	巴林左旗	Chifeng	Inner Mongolia	Banner		327,765	150422	BAZ
Bairin Right	巴林右旗	Chifeng	Inner Mongolia	Banner		175,543	150423	BAY
Hexigten	克什克腾旗	Chifeng	Inner Mongolia	Banner		211,155	150425	HXT
Ongniud	翁牛特旗	Chifeng	Inner Mongolia	Banner		433,298	150426	ONG
Harqin	喀喇沁旗	Chifeng	Inner Mongolia	Banner		293,246	150428	HAR
Aohan	敖汉旗	Chifeng	Inner Mongolia	Banner		547,043	150430	AHN
Linxi	林西县	Chifeng	Inner Mongolia	County		200,619	150424	LXM
Ningcheng	宁城县	Chifeng	Inner Mongolia	County		546,845	150429	NCH
Horqin	科尔沁区	Tongliao	Inner Mongolia	District		898,895	150502	HQN
Horqin Left Middle	科尔沁左翼中旗	Tongliao	Inner Mongolia	Banner		514,741	150521	HZZ
Horqin Left Rear	科尔沁左翼后旗	Tongliao	Inner Mongolia	Banner		379,237	150522	HZI
Hure	库伦旗	Tongliao	Inner Mongolia	Banner		167,020	150524	HUR
Naiman	奈曼旗	Tongliao	Inner Mongolia	Banner		401,509	150525	NMN
Jarud	扎鲁特旗	Tongliao	Inner Mongolia	Banner		279,371	150526	JAR
Kailu	开鲁县	Tongliao	Inner Mongolia	County		396,166	150523	KLU
Holingol	霍林郭勒市	Tongliao	Inner Mongolia	City		102,214	150581	HOL
Dongsheng	东胜区	Ordos	Inner Mongolia	District		582,544	150602	DNS
Kangbashi	康巴什区	Ordos	Inner Mongolia				150603	KBS
Dalad	达拉特旗	Ordos	Inner Mongolia	Banner		322,101	150621	DLA
Jungar	准格尔旗	Ordos	Inner Mongolia	Banner		356,501	150622	JUN
Otog Front	鄂托克前旗	Ordos	Inner Mongolia	Banner		68,282	150623	OTQ
Otog	鄂托克旗	Ordos	Inner Mongolia	Banner		148,844	150624	OTO
Hanggin	杭锦旗	Ordos	Inner Mongolia	Banner		111,102	150625	HAQ
Uxin	乌审旗	Ordos	Inner Mongolia	Banner		124,527	150626	UXI
Ejin Horo	伊金霍洛旗	Ordos	Inner Mongolia	Banner		226,752	150627	EHO
Hailar	海拉尔区	Hulunbuir	Inner Mongolia	District		344,947	150702	HLR
Jalainur	扎赉诺尔区	Hulunbuir	Inner Mongolia	District		not established	150703	ZLN
Arun	阿荣旗	Hulunbuir	Inner Mongolia	Banner		278,744	150721	ARU
Old Barag	陈巴尔虎旗	Hulunbuir	Inner Mongolia	Banner		58,244	150725	CBA
New Barag Left	新巴尔虎左旗	Hulunbuir	Inner Mongolia	Banner		40,258	150726	XBZ
New Barag Right	新巴尔虎右旗	Hulunbuir	Inner Mongolia	Banner		36,356	150727	XBY
Morin Dawa Daur Autonomous Banner	莫力达瓦达斡尔族自治旗	Hulunbuir	Inner Mongolia	Autonomous banner (Daur)		276,912	150722	MDD
Oroqen Autonomous Banner	鄂伦春自治旗	Hulunbuir	Inner Mongolia	Autonomous banner (Oroqin)		223,752	150723	ORO
Ewenki Autonomous Banner	鄂温克族自治旗	Hulunbuir	Inner Mongolia	Autonomous banner (Evenk)		134,981	150724	EWE
Manzhouli	满洲里市	Hulunbuir	Inner Mongolia	City		249,473	150781	MLX
Yakeshi	牙克石市	Hulunbuir	Inner Mongolia	City		352,177	150782	YKS
Zhalantun	扎兰屯市	Hulunbuir	Inner Mongolia	City		366,326	150783	ZLT
Ergun	额尔古纳市	Hulunbuir	Inner Mongolia	City		76,667	150784	ERG
Genhe	根河市	Hulunbuir	Inner Mongolia	City		110,441	150785	GHS
Linhe	临河区	Bayannur	Inner Mongolia	District		541,721	150802	LNH
Urad Front	乌拉特前旗	Bayannur	Inner Mongolia	Banner		293,269	150823	URQ
Urad Middle	乌拉特中旗	Bayannur	Inner Mongolia	Banner		134,204	150824	URZ
Urad Rear	乌拉特后旗	Bayannur	Inner Mongolia	Banner		65,207	150825	URH
Hanggin Rear	杭锦后旗	Bayannur	Inner Mongolia	Banner		257,943	150826	HAH
Wuyuan	杭锦后旗	Bayannur	Inner Mongolia	County		260,480	150821	WYM
Dengkou	磴口县	Bayannur	Inner Mongolia	County		117,091	150822	DKO
Jining	集宁区	Ulanqab	Inner Mongolia	District		298,887	150902	JIN
Qahar Right Front	察哈尔右翼前旗	Ulanqab	Inner Mongolia	Banner		247,285	150926	QYM
Qahar Right Middle	察哈尔右翼中旗	Ulanqab	Inner Mongolia	Banner		219,038	150927	QYZ
Qahar Right Rear	察哈尔右翼后旗	Ulanqab	Inner Mongolia	Banner		217,877	150928	QYH
Dorbod	四子王旗	Ulanqab	Inner Mongolia	Banner		210,646	150929	DOR
Zhuozi	卓资县	Ulanqab	Inner Mongolia	County		226,144	150921	ZUZ
Huade	化德县	Ulanqab	Inner Mongolia	County		175,621	150922	HDE
Shangdu	商都县	Ulanqab	Inner Mongolia	County		346,985	150923	SDX
Xinghe	兴和县	Ulanqab	Inner Mongolia	County		317,286	150924	XHM
Liangcheng	凉城县	Ulanqab	Inner Mongolia	County		246,038	150925	LCM
Fengzhen	丰镇市	Ulanqab	Inner Mongolia	City		336,749	150981	FZS
Ulanhot	乌兰浩特市	Hinggan	Inner Mongolia	City		327,081	152201	ULO
Arxan	阿尔山市	Hinggan	Inner Mongolia	City		68,311	152202	ARS
Horqin Right Front	科尔沁右翼前旗	Hinggan	Inner Mongolia	Banner		299,834	152221	HYQ
Horqin Right Middle	科尔沁右翼中旗	Hinggan	Inner Mongolia	Banner		251,465	152222	HYZ
Jalaid	扎赉特旗	Hinggan	Inner Mongolia	Banner		392,346	152223	JAL
Tuquan	突泉县	Hinggan	Inner Mongolia	County		274,213	152224	TUQ
Erenhot	二连浩特市	Xilingol	Inner Mongolia	City		74,197	152501	ERC
Xilinhot	锡林浩特市	Xilingol	Inner Mongolia	City		245,886	152502	XLI
Abag	阿巴嘎旗	Xilingol	Inner Mongolia	Banner		43,574	152522	ABG
Sonid Left	苏尼特左旗	Xilingol	Inner Mongolia	Banner		33,652	152523	SOZ
Sonid Right	苏尼特右旗	Xilingol	Inner Mongolia	Banner		71,063	152524	SOY
East Ujimqin	东乌珠穆沁旗	Xilingol	Inner Mongolia	Banner		93,962	152525	DUJ
West Ujimqin	西乌珠穆沁旗	Xilingol	Inner Mongolia	Banner		87,614	152526	XUJ
Taibus	太仆寺旗	Xilingol	Inner Mongolia	Banner		112,339	152527	TAB
Bordered Yellow	镶黄旗	Xilingol	Inner Mongolia	Banner		28,450	152528	XHG
Plain and Bordered White	正镶白旗	Xilingol	Inner Mongolia	Banner		54,443	152529	ZXB
Plain Blue	正蓝旗	Xilingol	Inner Mongolia	Banner		81,967	152530	ZLM
Duolun	多伦县	Xilingol	Inner Mongolia	County		100,893	152531	DLM
Alxa Left	阿拉善左旗	Alxa	Inner Mongolia	Banner		173,494	152921	ALZ
Alxa Right	阿拉善右旗	Alxa	Inner Mongolia	Banner		25,430	152922	ALY
Ejin	额济纳旗	Alxa	Inner Mongolia	Banner		32,410	152923	EJI
Xuanwu	玄武区	Nanjing	Jiangsu	District		651,957	320102	XWU
Qinhuai	秦淮区	Nanjing	Jiangsu	District		405,891	320104	QHU
Jianye	建邺区	Nanjing	Jiangsu	District		426,999	320105	JYQ
Gulou	鼓楼区	Nanjing	Jiangsu	District		826,074	320106	GLQ
Pukou	浦口区	Nanjing	Jiangsu	District		710,298	320111	PKO
Qixia	栖霞区	Nanjing	Jiangsu	District		644,503	320113	QXA
Yuhuatai	雨花台区	Nanjing	Jiangsu	District		391,285	320114	YHT
Jiangning	江宁区	Nanjing	Jiangsu	District		1,145,628	320115	JNN
Luhe	六合区	Nanjing	Jiangsu	District		915,845	320116	LHE
Lishui	溧水区	Nanjing	Jiangsu	District		421,323	320117	LDS
Gaochun	高淳区	Nanjing	Jiangsu	District		417,729	320118	GCU
Liangxi	梁溪区	Wuxi	Jiangsu	District			320213	LXB
Xinwu	新吴区	Wuxi	Jiangsu	District			320214	XIW
Binhu	滨湖区	Wuxi	Jiangsu	District		1,225,772	320211	BNH
Huishan	惠山区	Wuxi	Jiangsu	District		691,059	320206	HSU
Xishan	锡山区	Wuxi	Jiangsu	District		681,300	320205	XSW
Jiangyin	江阴市	Wuxi	Jiangsu	City		1,594,829	320281	JIA
Yixing	宜兴市	Wuxi	Jiangsu	City		1,235,476	320282	YIX
Gulou	鼓楼区	Xuzhou	Jiangsu	District		490,855	320302	GLU
Yunlong	云龙区	Xuzhou	Jiangsu	District		345,393	320303	YLF
Jiawang	贾汪区	Xuzhou	Jiangsu	District		430,712	320305	JWQ
Quanshan	泉山区	Xuzhou	Jiangsu	District		539,693	320311	QSX
Tongshan	铜山区	Xuzhou	Jiangsu	District		1,247,125	320312	TSN
Feng(xian)	丰县	Xuzhou	Jiangsu	County		963,531	320321	FXN
Pei(xian)	沛县	Xuzhou	Jiangsu	County		1,141,935	320322	PEI
Suining	睢宁县	Xuzhou	Jiangsu	County		1,039,315	320324	SNI
Xinyi	新沂市	Xuzhou	Jiangsu	City		920,628	320381	XYW
Pizhou	邳州市	Xuzhou	Jiangsu	City		1,458,038	320382	PZO
Tianning	天宁区	Changzhou	Jiangsu	District		513,682	320402	TNQ
Zhonglou	钟楼区	Changzhou	Jiangsu	District		505,936	320404	ZLQ
Xinbei	新北区	Changzhou	Jiangsu	District		596,807	320411	XBQ
Wujin	武进区	Changzhou	Jiangsu	District		1,568,999	320412	WJN
Liyang	溧阳市	Changzhou	Jiangsu	City		749,377	320481	LYR
Jintan	金坛区	Changzhou	Jiangsu	District		552,047	320413	JTN
Gusu	姑苏区	Suzhou	Jiangsu	District		not established	320508	GSU
Huqiu	虎丘区	Suzhou	Jiangsu	District		572,313	320505	HUQ
Wuzhong	吴中区	Suzhou	Jiangsu	District		1,853,656	320506	WZQ
Xiangcheng	相城区	Suzhou	Jiangsu	District		693,576	320507	XAU
Wujiang	吴江区	Suzhou	Jiangsu	District		1,275,090	320509	WJU
Changshu	常熟市	Suzhou	Jiangsu	City		1,510,103	320581	CGS
Zhangjiagang	张家港市	Suzhou	Jiangsu	City		1,248,414	320582	ZJG
Kunshan	昆山市	Suzhou	Jiangsu	City		1,646,318	320583	KUS
Taicang	太仓市	Suzhou	Jiangsu	City		712,069	320585	TAC
Chongchuan	崇川区	Nantong	Jiangsu	District		868,262	320602	CCQ
Tongzhou	通州区	Nantong	Jiangsu	District		1,138,738	320612	TZT
Hai'an	海安市	Nantong	Jiangsu	City		866,337	320685	
Rudong	如东县	Nantong	Jiangsu	County		995,983	320623	RDG
Qidong	启东市	Nantong	Jiangsu	City		972,525	320681	QID
Rugao	如皋市	Nantong	Jiangsu	City		1,267,066	320682	RGO
Haimen	海门区	Nantong	Jiangsu	District		907,598	320613	
Haizhou	海州区	Lianyungang	Jiangsu	District		818,134	320706	HIZ
Lianyun	连云区	Lianyungang	Jiangsu	District		231,697	320703	LYB
Ganyu	赣榆区	Lianyungang	Jiangsu	District		949,438	320707	GYB
Donghai	东海县	Lianyungang	Jiangsu	County		952,250	320722	DHX
Guanyun	灌云县	Lianyungang	Jiangsu	County		817,629	320723	GYS
Guannan	灌南县	Lianyungang	Jiangsu	County		624,766	320724	GUN
Qingjiangpu	清江浦区	Huai'an	Jiangsu	District			320812	QJP
Huai'an	淮安区	Huai'an	Jiangsu	District		984,601	320803	HAA
Huaiyin	淮阴区	Huai'an	Jiangsu	District		788,634	320804	HUU
Lianshui	涟水县	Huai'an	Jiangsu	County		859,991	320826	LSI
Hongze	洪泽区	Huai'an	Jiangsu	District		326,365	320813	HZK
Xuyi	盱眙县	Huai'an	Jiangsu	County		658,830	320830	XUY
Jinhu	金湖县	Huai'an	Jiangsu	County		321,283	320831	JHU
Tinghu	亭湖区	Yancheng	Jiangsu	District		904,417	320902	TNH
Yandu	盐都区	Yancheng	Jiangsu	District		711,300	320903	YDU
Dafeng	大丰区	Yancheng	Jiangsu	District		707,069	320904	DFE
Xiangshui	响水县	Yancheng	Jiangsu	County		509,524	320921	XSH
Binhai	滨海县	Yancheng	Jiangsu	County		956,162	320922	BHI
Funing	阜宁县	Yancheng	Jiangsu	County		843,275	320923	FNG
Sheyang	射阳县	Yancheng	Jiangsu	County		896,639	320924	SEY
Jianhu	建湖县	Yancheng	Jiangsu	County		741,646	320925	JIH
Dongtai	东台市	Yancheng	Jiangsu	City		990,208	320981	DTS
Guangling	广陵区	Yangzhou	Jiangsu	District		340,977	321002	GGL
Hanjiang	邗江区	Yangzhou	Jiangsu	District		576,873	321003	HAJ
Baoying	宝应县	Yangzhou	Jiangsu	County		752,074	321023	BYI
Yizheng	仪征市	Yangzhou	Jiangsu	City		563,945	321081	YZE
Gaoyou	高邮市	Yangzhou	Jiangsu	City		744,662	321084	GYO
Jiangdu	江都区	Yangzhou	Jiangsu	District		1,006,780	321012	JDJ
Jingkou	京口区	Zhenjiang	Jiangsu	District		601,671	321102	JKQ
Runzhou	润州区	Zhenjiang	Jiangsu	District		296,453	321111	RZQ
Dantu	丹徒区	Zhenjiang	Jiangsu	District		302,276	321112	DNT
Danyang	丹阳市	Zhenjiang	Jiangsu	City		960,418	321181	DNY
Yangzhong	扬中市	Zhenjiang	Jiangsu	City		334,886	321182	YZG
Jurong	句容市	Zhenjiang	Jiangsu	City		617,680	321183	JRG
Hailing	海陵区	Taizhou	Jiangsu	District		475,100	321202	HIL
Gaogang	高港区	Taizhou	Jiangsu	District		250,500	321203	GGQ
Jiangyan	姜堰区	Taizhou	Jiangsu	District		729,000	321204	JYR
Jingjiang	靖江市	Taizhou	Jiangsu	City		684,600	321282	XHS
Taixing	泰兴市	Taizhou	Jiangsu	City		1,074,300	321283	JGJ
Xinghua	兴化市	Taizhou	Jiangsu	City		1,253,800	321281	TXG
Sucheng	宿城区	Suqian	Jiangsu	District		796,627	321302	SCE
Suyu	宿豫区	Suqian	Jiangsu	District		641,059	321311	SYY
Shuyang	沭阳县	Suqian	Jiangsu	County		1,538,054	321322	SYD
Siyang	泗阳县	Suqian	Jiangsu	County		830,502	321323	SIY
Sihong	泗洪县	Suqian	Jiangsu	County		909,311	321324	SIH
Donghu	东湖区	Nanchang	Jiangxi	District		575,489	360102	DHU
Xihu	西湖区	Nanchang	Jiangxi	District		503,822	360103	XHQ
Qingyunpu	青云谱区	Nanchang	Jiangxi	District		316,723	360104	QYP
Honggutan	红谷滩区	Nanchang	Jiangxi	District			360113	
Qingshanhu	青山湖区	Nanchang	Jiangxi	District		897,841	360111	QSH
Nanchang	南昌县	Nanchang	Jiangxi	County		1,018,675	360121	NCA
Xinjian	新建区	Nanchang	Jiangxi	District		795,412	360112	XJQ
Anyi	安义县	Nanchang	Jiangxi	County		180,194	360123	AYI
Jinxian	进贤县	Nanchang	Jiangxi	County		690,446	360124	JXX
Changjiang	昌江区	Jingdezhen	Jiangxi	District		192,203	360202	CJG
Zhushan	珠山区	Jingdezhen	Jiangxi	District		281,358	360203	ZSJ
Fuliang	浮梁县	Jingdezhen	Jiangxi	County		303,563	360222	FLX
Leping	乐平市	Jingdezhen	Jiangxi	City		810,353	360281	LEP
Anyuan	安源区	Pingxiang	Jiangxi	District		559,909	360302	AYQ
Xiangdong	湘东区	Pingxiang	Jiangxi	District		358,990	360313	XDG
Lianhua	莲花县	Pingxiang	Jiangxi	County		236,328	360321	LHG
Shangli	上栗县	Pingxiang	Jiangxi	County		441,860	360322	SLI
Luxi	芦溪县	Pingxiang	Jiangxi	County		257,423	360323	LXP
Lianxi	濂溪区	Jiujiang	Jiangxi	District		302,228	360402	LXO
Xunyang	浔阳区	Jiujiang	Jiangxi	District		402,758	360403	XYC
Chaisang	柴桑区	Jiujiang	Jiangxi	District		315,219	360404	
Wuning	武宁县	Jiujiang	Jiangxi	County		360,269	360423	WUN
Xiushui	修水县	Jiujiang	Jiangxi	County		739,986	360424	XSG
Yongxiu	永修县	Jiujiang	Jiangxi	County		376,107	360425	YOX
De'an	德安县	Jiujiang	Jiangxi	County		222,322	360426	DEA
Lushan	庐山市	Jiujiang	Jiangxi	City		245,526	360483	LKS
Duchang	都昌县	Jiujiang	Jiangxi	County		716,370	360428	DUC
Hukou	湖口县	Jiujiang	Jiangxi	County		275,797	360429	HUK
Pengze	彭泽县	Jiujiang	Jiangxi	County		353,149	360430	PZE
Ruichang	瑞昌市	Jiujiang	Jiangxi	City		419,047	360481	RCG
Gongqingcheng	共青城市	Jiujiang	Jiangxi	City		120,000	360482	GQC
Yushui	渝水区	Xinyu	Jiangxi	District		839,487	360502	YSR
Fenyi	分宜县	Xinyu	Jiangxi	County		299,386	360521	FYI
Yuehu	月湖区	Yingtan	Jiangxi	District		214,028	360602	YHY
Yujiang	余江区	Yingtan	Jiangxi	County		352,427	360603	
Guixi	贵溪市	Yingtan	Jiangxi	City		558,451	360681	GXS
Zhanggong	章贡区	Ganzhou	Jiangxi	District		642,653	360702	ZGG
Nankang	南康区	Ganzhou	Jiangxi	District		787,636	360703	NKN
Ganxian	赣县区	Ganzhou	Jiangxi	District		546,964	360704	GXQ
Xinfeng	信丰县	Ganzhou	Jiangxi	County		664,047	360722	XNF
Dayu	大余县	Ganzhou	Jiangxi	County		289,378	360723	DYX
Shangyou	上犹县	Ganzhou	Jiangxi	County		257,464	360724	SYO
Chongyi	崇义县	Ganzhou	Jiangxi	County		187,234	360725	CYX
Anyuan	安远县	Ganzhou	Jiangxi	County		340,740	360726	AYN
Longnan	龙南市	Ganzhou	Jiangxi	City		300,301	360782	
Dingnan	定南县	Ganzhou	Jiangxi	County		172,771	360728	DNN
Quannan	全南县	Ganzhou	Jiangxi	County		180,691	360729	QNN
Ningdu	宁都县	Ganzhou	Jiangxi	County		794,806	360730	NDU
Yudu	于都县	Ganzhou	Jiangxi	County		853,457	360731	YUD
Xingguo	兴国县	Ganzhou	Jiangxi	County		719,830	360732	XGG
Huichang	会昌县	Ganzhou	Jiangxi	County		445,137	360733	HIC
Xunwu	寻乌县	Ganzhou	Jiangxi	County		288,207	360734	XNW
Shicheng	石城县	Ganzhou	Jiangxi	County		278,246	360735	SIC
Ruijin	瑞金市	Ganzhou	Jiangxi	City		618,885	360781	RJS
Qingyuan	青原区	Ji'an	Jiangxi	District		200,176	360803	JZU
Jizhou	吉州区	Ji'an	Jiangxi	District		338,524	360802	QUQ
Ji'an	吉安县	Ji'an	Jiangxi	County		464,295	360821	JAX
Jishui	吉水县	Ji'an	Jiangxi	County		501,337	360822	JSG
Xiajiang	峡江县	Ji'an	Jiangxi	County		184,483	360823	XJG
Xingan	新干县	Ji'an	Jiangxi	County		329,830	360824	XGA
Yongfeng	永丰县	Ji'an	Jiangxi	County		428,276	360825	YFX
Taihe	泰和县	Ji'an	Jiangxi	County		512,225	360826	THE
Suichuan	遂川县	Ji'an	Jiangxi	County		535,974	360827	SCN
Wan'an	万安县	Ji'an	Jiangxi	County		301,699	360828	WAX
Anfu	安福县	Ji'an	Jiangxi	County		385,631	360829	AFU
Yongxin	永新县	Ji'an	Jiangxi	County		475,580	360830	YXG
Jinggangshan	井冈山市	Ji'an	Jiangxi	City		152,310	360881	JGS
Yuanzhou	袁州区	Yichun	Jiangxi	District		1,045,952	360902	YNZ
Fengxin	奉新县	Yichun	Jiangxi	County		312,956	360921	FGX
Wanzai	万载县	Yichun	Jiangxi	County		476,856	360922	WZA
Shanggao	上高县	Yichun	Jiangxi	County		326,697	360923	SGO
Yifeng	宜丰县	Yichun	Jiangxi	County		274,046	360924	YFG
Jing'an	靖安县	Yichun	Jiangxi	County		144,800	360925	JGA
Tonggu	铜鼓县	Yichun	Jiangxi	County		135,139	360926	TGU
Fengcheng	丰城市	Yichun	Jiangxi	City		1,336,393	360981	FCS
Zhangshu	樟树市	Yichun	Jiangxi	City		555,103	360982	ZSS
Gao'an	高安市	Yichun	Jiangxi	City		811,633	360983	GAS
Linchuan	临川区	Fuzhou	Jiangxi	District		1,089,888	361002	LCR
Nancheng	南城县	Fuzhou	Jiangxi	County		306,236	361021	NCE
Lichuan	黎川县	Fuzhou	Jiangxi	County		230,086	361022	LCP
Nanfeng	南丰县	Fuzhou	Jiangxi	County		287,932	361023	NFG
Chongren	崇仁县	Fuzhou	Jiangxi	County		347,840	361024	CRN
Le'an	乐安县	Fuzhou	Jiangxi	County		345,769	361025	LEA
Yihuang	宜黄县	Fuzhou	Jiangxi	County		224,039	361026	YHX
Jinxi	金溪县	Fuzhou	Jiangxi	County		294,826	361027	JXF
Zixi	资溪县	Fuzhou	Jiangxi	County		111,983	361028	ZXI
Dongxiang	东乡区	Fuzhou	Jiangxi	District		438,318	361003	DXA
Guangchang	广昌县	Fuzhou	Jiangxi	County		235,395	361030	GCG
Xinzhou	信州区	Shangrao	Jiangxi	District		416,219	361102	XZU
Guangfeng	广丰区	Shangrao	Jiangxi	District		752,939	361103	GFQ
Guangxin	广信区	Shangrao	Jiangxi	District		700,266	361104	SRX
Yushan	玉山县	Shangrao	Jiangxi	County		574,363	361123	YUS
Yanshan	铅山县	Shangrao	Jiangxi	County		427,000	361124	YSG
Hengfeng	横峰县	Shangrao	Jiangxi	County		184,870	361125	HFG
Yiyang	弋阳县	Shangrao	Jiangxi	County		353,378	361126	YYB
Yugan	余干县	Shangrao	Jiangxi	County		887,603	361127	YUG
Poyang	鄱阳县	Shangrao	Jiangxi	County		1,296,756	361128	POY
Wannian	万年县	Shangrao	Jiangxi	County		359,098	361129	WNI
Wuyuan	婺源县	Shangrao	Jiangxi	County		334,020	361130	WUY
Dexing	德兴市	Shangrao	Jiangxi	City		293,202	361181	DEX
Nanguan	南关区	Changchun	Jilin	District		1,012,547	220102	NGN
Kuancheng	宽城区	Changchun	Jilin	District		457,959	220103	KCQ
Chaoyang	朝阳区	Changchun	Jilin	District		846,688	220104	CYC
Erdao	二道区	Changchun	Jilin	District		402,090	220105	EDQ
Luyuan	绿园区	Changchun	Jilin	District		810,831	220106	LYQ
Shuangyang	双阳区	Changchun	Jilin	District		377,933	220112	SYQ
Jiutai	九台区	Changchun	Jilin	District		738,606	220113	JTI
Nong'an	农安县	Changchun	Jilin	County		102,968	220122	NAJ
Yushu	榆树市	Changchun	Jilin	City		1,060,969	220182	YSS
Dehui	德惠市	Changchun	Jilin	City		839,786	220183	DEH
Gongzhuling		Changchun	Jilin	City		1,093,314	220184	GZL
Changyi	昌邑区	Jilin	Jilin	District		659,188	220202	CYI
Longtan	龙潭区	Jilin	Jilin	District		527,532	220203	LTQ
Chuanying	船营区	Jilin	Jilin	District		492,159	220204	CYJ
Fengman	丰满区	Jilin	Jilin	District		296,924	220211	FMQ
Yongji	永吉县	Jilin	Jilin	County		394,622	220221	YOJ
Jiaohe	蛟河市	Jilin	Jilin	City		447,380	220281	JHJ
Huadian	桦甸市	Jilin	Jilin	City		444,997	220282	HDJ
Shulan	舒兰市	Jilin	Jilin	City		645,925	220283	SLN
Panshi	磐石市	Jilin	Jilin	City		505,954	220284	PSI
Tiexi	铁西区	Siping	Jilin	District		278,837	220302	TXS
Tiedong	铁东区	Siping	Jilin	District		335,000	220303	TDQ
Lishu	梨树县	Siping	Jilin	County		782,900	220322	LSU
Yitong Manchu Autonomous County	伊通满族自治县	Siping	Jilin	Autonomous county (Manchu)		475,409	220323	YTO
Shuangliao	双辽市	Siping	Jilin	City		420,865	220382	SLS
Longshan	龙山区	Liaoyuan	Jilin	District		294,380	220402	LGS
Xi'an	西安区	Liaoyuan	Jilin	District		178,039	220403	XAA
Dongfeng	东丰县	Liaoyuan	Jilin	County		355,201	220421	DGF
Dongliao	东辽县	Liaoyuan	Jilin	County		349,025	220422	DLX
Dongchang	东昌区	Tonghua	Jilin	District		360,195	220502	DCT
Erdaojiang	二道江区	Tonghua	Jilin	District		146,682	220503	EDJ
Tonghua	通化县	Tonghua	Jilin	County		247,225	220521	THX
Huinan	辉南县	Tonghua	Jilin	County		359,453	220523	HNA
Liuhe	柳河县	Tonghua	Jilin	County		363,962	220524	LHC
Meihekou	梅河口市	Tonghua	Jilin	City		615,367	220581	MHK
Ji'an	集安市	Tonghua	Jilin	City		232,358	220582	KNC
Hunjiang	浑江区	Baishan	Jilin	District		364,849	220602	HJH
Jiangyuan	江源区	Baishan	Jilin	District		254,381	220605	JYT
Fusong	抚松县	Baishan	Jilin	County		298,063	220621	FSG
Jingyu	靖宇县	Baishan	Jilin	County		131,677	220622	JYJ
Changbai Korean Autonomous County	长白朝鲜族自治县	Baishan	Jilin	Autonomous county (Korean)		72,575	220623	CGB
Linjiang	临江市	Baishan	Jilin	City		175,030	220681	LIN
Ningjiang	宁江区	Songyuan	Jilin	District		612,816	220702	NJA
Changling	长岭县	Songyuan	Jilin	County		639,205	220722	CLG
Qian'an	乾安县	Songyuan	Jilin	County		301,438	220723	QAJ
Qian Gorlos Mongol Autonomous County	前郭尔罗斯蒙古族自治县	Songyuan	Jilin	Autonomous county (Mongol)		607,640	220721	QGO
Fuyu	扶余市	Songyuan	Jilin	City		718,987	220781	FYA
Taobei	洮北区	Baicheng	Jilin	District		517,613	220802	TBQ
Zhenlai	镇赉县	Baicheng	Jilin	County		298,404	220821	ZLA
Tongyu	通榆县	Baicheng	Jilin	County		353,604	220822	TGY
Taonan	洮南市	Baicheng	Jilin	City		432,271	220881	TNS
Da'an	大安市	Baicheng	Jilin	City		431,166	220882	DAN
Yanji	延吉市	Yanbian	Jilin	City		563,154	222401	YNJ
Tumen	图们市	Yanbian	Jilin	City		134,498	222402	TME
Dunhua	敦化市	Yanbian	Jilin	City		483,631	222403	DHS
Hunchun	珲春市	Yanbian	Jilin	City		241,861	222404	HUC
Longjing	龙井市	Yanbian	Jilin	City		177,295	222405	LJJ
Helong	和龙市	Yanbian	Jilin	City		189,597	222406	HEL
Wangqing	汪清县	Yanbian	Jilin	County		255,499	222424	WGQ
Antu	安图县	Yanbian	Jilin	County		226,065	222426	ATU
Heping	和平区	Shenyang	Liaoning	District		638,959	210102	HEP
Shenhe	沈河区	Shenyang	Liaoning	District		719,033	210103	SHQ
Dadong	大东区	Shenyang	Liaoning	District		696,711	210104	DDQ
Huanggu	皇姑区	Shenyang	Liaoning	District		809,100	210105	HGU
Tiexi	铁西区	Shenyang	Liaoning	District		878,261	210106	TXI
Sujiatun	苏家屯区	Shenyang	Liaoning	District		429,143	210111	SJT
Hunnan	浑南区	Shenyang	Liaoning	District		301,832	210112	DLQ
Shenbei	沈北新区	Shenyang	Liaoning	District		318,895	210113	SBX
Yuhong	于洪区	Shenyang	Liaoning	District		408,798	210114	YHQ
Liaozhong	辽中区	Shenyang	Liaoning	County		538,220	210115	LZF
Kangping	康平县	Shenyang	Liaoning	County		351,188	210123	KPG
Faku	法库县	Shenyang	Liaoning	County		446,223	210124	FKU
Xinmin	新民市	Shenyang	Liaoning	City		696,895	210181	XMS
Zhongshan	中山区	Dalian	Liaoning	District		357,091	210202	ZSD
Xigang	西岗区	Dalian	Liaoning	District		307,850	210203	XGD
Shahekou	沙河口区	Dalian	Liaoning	District		653,762	210204	SHK
Ganjingzi	甘井子区	Dalian	Liaoning	District		722,559	210211	GJZ
Lüshunkou	旅顺口区	Dalian	Liaoning	District		212,752	210212	LSK
Jinzhou	金州区	Dalian	Liaoning	District		729,100	210213	JZH
Pulandian	普兰店区	Dalian	Liaoning	District		827,585	210214	PLN
Changhai	长海县	Dalian	Liaoning	County		74,010	210224	CHX
Wafangdian	瓦房店市	Dalian	Liaoning	City		1,026,160	210281	WFD
Zhuanghe	庄河市	Dalian	Liaoning	City		922,876	210283	ZHH
Haizhou	海州区	Fuxin	Liaoning	District		277,902	210902	HZF
Xinqiu	新邱区	Fuxin	Liaoning	District		91,376	210903	XQF
Taiping	太平区	Fuxin	Liaoning	District		171,625	210904	TPG
Qinghemen	清河门区	Fuxin	Liaoning	District		73,923	210905	QHM
Xihe	细河区	Fuxin	Liaoning	District		165,525	210911	XHO
Fuxin Mongol Autonomous County	阜新蒙古族自治县	Fuxin	Liaoning	Autonomous county (Mongol)		732,630	210921	FXX
Zhangwu	彰武县	Fuxin	Liaoning	County		417,724	210922	ZWU
Pingshan	平山区	Benxi	Liaoning	District		349,130	210502	PSN
Xihu	溪湖区	Benxi	Liaoning	District		252,671	210503	XHB
Mingshan	明山区	Benxi	Liaoning	District		409,576	210504	MSB
Nanfen	南芬区	Benxi	Liaoning	District		82,917	210505	NFQ
Benxi Manchu Autonomous County	本溪满族自治县	Benxi	Liaoning	Autonomous county (Manchu)		296,218	210521	BXX
Huanren Manchu Autonomous County	桓仁满族自治县	Benxi	Liaoning	Autonomous county (Manchu)		319,026	210522	HRL
Yuanbao	元宝区	Dandong	Liaoning	District		191,200	210602	YBD
Zhenxing	振兴区	Dandong	Liaoning	District		372,400	210603	ZXQ
Zhen'an	振安区	Dandong	Liaoning	District		173,800	210604	ZAQ
Kuandian Manchu Autonomous County	宽甸满族自治县	Dandong	Liaoning	Autonomous county (Manchu)		434,900	210624	KDN
Donggang	东港市	Dandong	Liaoning	City		664,000	210681	DGS
Fengcheng	凤城市	Dandong	Liaoning	City		587,900	210682	FCL
Baita	白塔区	Liaoyang	Liaoning	District		210,317	211002	BTL
Wensheng	文圣区	Liaoyang	Liaoning	District		184,129	211003	WSL
Hongwei	宏伟区	Liaoyang	Liaoning	District		117,776	211004	HWQ
Gongchangling	弓长岭区	Liaoyang	Liaoning	District		89,441	211005	GCL
Taizihe	太子河区	Liaoyang	Liaoning	District		123,415	211011	TZH
Liaoyang	辽阳县	Liaoyang	Liaoning	County		595,189	211021	LYX
Dengta	灯塔市	Liaoyang	Liaoning	City		513,538	211081	DTA
Shuangtaizi	双台子区	Panjin	Liaoning	District		195,486	211102	STZ
Xinglongtai	兴隆台区	Panjin	Liaoning	District		398,919	211103	XLT
Dawa	大洼区	Panjin	Liaoning	County		393,318	211104	DWL
Panshan	盘山县	Panjin	Liaoning	County		294,646	211122	PNS
Yinzhou	银州区	Tieling	Liaoning	District		346,613	211202	YZU
Qinghe	清河区	Tieling	Liaoning	District		98,421	211204	QHQ
Tieling	铁岭县	Tieling	Liaoning	County		389,494	211221	TLG
Xifeng	西丰县	Tieling	Liaoning	County		349,187	211223	XIF
Changtu	昌图县	Tieling	Liaoning	County		1,038,848	211224	CTX
Diaobingshan	调兵山市	Tieling	Liaoning	City		241,028	211281	DBS
Kaiyuan	开原市	Tieling	Liaoning	City		590,888	211282	KYS
Shuangta	双塔区	Chaoyang	Liaoning	District		315,437	211302	STQ
Longcheng	龙城区	Chaoyang	Liaoning	District		188,434	211303	LCL
Chaoyang	朝阳县	Chaoyang	Liaoning	County		628,066	211321	CYG
Jianping	建平县	Chaoyang	Liaoning	County		583,307	211322	JPG
Harqin Left Wing Mongolian Autonomous County	喀喇沁左翼蒙古族自治县	Chaoyang	Liaoning	Autonomous county (Mongol)		424,546	211324	HAZ
Beipiao	北票市	Chaoyang	Liaoning	City		617,236	211381	BPO
Lingyuan	凌源市	Chaoyang	Liaoning	City		644,630	211382	LYK
Xinfu	新抚区	Fushun	Liaoning	District		276,518	210402	XFU
Dongzhou	东洲区	Fushun	Liaoning	District		335,779	210403	DOZ
Wanghua	望花区	Fushun	Liaoning	District		371,592	210404	WHF
Shuncheng	顺城区	Fushun	Liaoning	District		416,856	210411	SCF
Fushun	抚顺县	Fushun	Liaoning	County		190,528	210421	FSX
Xinbin Manchu Autonomous County	新宾满族自治县	Fushun	Liaoning	Autonomous county (Manchu)		306,018	210422	XBN
Qingyuan Manchu Autonomous County	清原满族自治县	Fushun	Liaoning	Autonomous county (Manchu)		339,969	210423	QYA
Tiedong	铁东区	Anshan	Liaoning	District		491,707	210302	TED
Tiexi	铁西区	Anshan	Liaoning	District		294,585	210303	TXL
Lishan	立山区	Anshan	Liaoning	District		427,434	210304	LAS
Qianshan	千山区	Anshan	Liaoning	District		259,819	210311	QSQ
Tai'an	台安县	Anshan	Liaoning	County		377,706	210321	TAX
Xiuyan Manchu Autonomous County	岫岩满族自治县	Anshan	Liaoning	Autonomous county (Manchu)		517,152	210323	XYL
Haicheng	海城市	Anshan	Liaoning	City		1,134,065	210381	HCL
Zhanqian	站前区	Yingkou	Liaoning	District		383,241	210802	ZQQ
Xishi	西市区	Yingkou	Liaoning	District		204,105	210803	XII
Bayuquan	鲅鱼圈区	Yingkou	Liaoning	District		431,329	210804	BYQ
Laobian	老边区	Yingkou	Liaoning	District		165,047	210811	LOB
Gaizhou	盖州市	Yingkou	Liaoning	City		723,218	210881	GZU
Dashiqiao	大石桥市	Yingkou	Liaoning	City		721,363	210882	DSQ
Guta	古塔区	Jinzhou	Liaoning	District		250,577	210702	GTQ
Taihe	凌河区	Jinzhou	Liaoning	District		454,883	210703	LHF
Linghe	太和区	Jinzhou	Liaoning	District		212,030	210711	THJ
Heishan	黑山县	Jinzhou	Liaoning	County		630,472	210726	HSL
Yi(xian)	义县	Jinzhou	Liaoning	County		439,377	210727	YXL
Linghai	凌海市	Jinzhou	Liaoning	City		576,143	210781	LHL
Beizhen	北镇市	Jinzhou	Liaoning	City		530,645	210782	BZN
Lianshan	连山区	Huludao	Liaoning	District		626,573	211402	LSQ
Longgang	龙港区	Huludao	Liaoning	District		202,306	211403	LGD
Nanpiao	南票区	Huludao	Liaoning	District		147,047	211404	NPQ
Suizhong	绥中县	Huludao	Liaoning	County		636,858	211421	SZL
Jianchang	建昌县	Huludao	Liaoning	County		622,068	211422	JCL
Xingcheng	兴城市	Huludao	Liaoning	City		552,180	211481	XCL
Xingqing District	兴庆区	Yinchuan	Ningxia	District	648.08	678,306	640104	XQN
Xixia District	西夏区	Yinchuan	Ningxia	District	883.84	329,310	640105	XQU
Jinfeng District	金凤区	Yinchuan	Ningxia	District	270.27	282,554	640106	JFU
Yongning County	永宁县	Yinchuan	Ningxia	County	934.06	218,260	640121	YGN
Helan County	贺兰县	Yinchuan	Ningxia	County	1,197.57	222,981	640122	HLN
Lingwu City	灵武市	Yinchuan	Ningxia	City	3,009.04	261,677	640181	LWU
Dawukou District	大武口区	Shizuishan	Ningxia	District	949.89	286,669	640202	DWK
Huinong District	惠农区	Shizuishan	Ningxia	District	1,064.79	185,803	640205	HNO
Pingluo County	平罗县	Shizuishan	Ningxia	County	2,059.79	253,010	640221	PLO
Litong District	利通区	Wuzhong	Ningxia	District	1,106.67	379,346	640302	LTW
Hongsibu District	红寺堡区	Wuzhong	Ningxia	District	2,756.22	165,016	640303	HSE
Yanchi County	盐池县	Wuzhong	Ningxia	County	6,553.79	146,560	640323	YCY
Tongxin County	同心县	Wuzhong	Ningxia	County	4,433.34	318,153	640324	TGX
Qingtongxia City	青铜峡市	Wuzhong	Ningxia	City	1,907.57	264,717	640381	QTX
Yuanzhou District	原州区	Guyuan	Ningxia	District	2,739.01	411,854	640402	YAZ
Xiji County	西吉县	Guyuan	Ningxia	County	3,129.4	354,321	640422	XJI
Longde County	隆德县	Guyuan	Ningxia	County	992.21	160,754	640423	LDE
Jingyuan County	泾源县	Guyuan	Ningxia	County	1,128.67	101,026	640424	JYK
Pengyang County	彭阳县	Guyuan	Ningxia	County	2,533.49	200,201	640425	PEY
Shapotou District	沙坡头区	Zhongwei	Ningxia	District	5,380.42	378,606	640502	SPT
Zhongning County	中宁县	Zhongwei	Ningxia	County	3,280.17	312,921	640521	ZNG
Haiyuan County	海原县	Zhongwei	Ningxia	County	4,989.55	389,305	640522	HYB
Chengdong District	城东区	Xining	Qinghai	District	112.86	359,688	630102	CDQ
Chengzhong District	城中区	Xining	Qinghai	District	153.58	296,987	630103	CDZ
Chengxi District	城西区	Xining	Qinghai	District	52.98	242,627	630104	CXQ
Chengbei District	城北区	Xining	Qinghai	District	138.1	299,002	630105	CBE
Huangzhong District	湟中区	Xining	Qinghai	District	2,444	136,632	630106	-
Huangyuan County	湟源县	Xining	Qinghai	County	1,545.48	437,835	630121	HYU
Datong Hui and Tu Autonomous County	大通回族土族自治县	Xining	Qinghai	Autonomous county (Hui & Tu)	3,159.7	435,937	630123	DAT
Ledu District	乐都区	Haidong	Qinghai	District	2,480.52	260,185	630202	LDA
Ping'an District	平安区	Haidong	Qinghai	District	734.59	102,975	630203	PIA
Minhe Hui and Tu Autonomous County	民和回族土族自治县	Haidong	Qinghai	Autonomous county (Hui & Tu)	1,897.32	350,118	630222	MHE
Huzhu Tu Autonomous County	互助土族自治县	Haidong	Qinghai	Autonomous county (Tu)	3,348	356,437	630223	HZT
Hualong Hui Autonomous County	化隆回族自治县	Haidong	Qinghai	Autonomous county (Hui)	2,706.77	203,317	630224	HLO
Xunhua Salar Autonomous County	循化撒拉族自治县	Haidong	Qinghai	Autonomous county (Salar)	1,815.21	123,814	630225	XUH
Menyuan Hui Autonomous County	门源回族自治县	Haibei	Qinghai	Autonomous county (Hui)	6,381.65	37,595	632221	MYU
Qilian County	祁连县	Haibei	Qinghai	County	13,919.79	13,789	632222	QLN
Haiyan County	海晏县	Haibei	Qinghai	County	4,443.1	11,497	632223	HIY
Gangca County	刚察县	Haibei	Qinghai	County	9,575.91	11,473	632224	GAN
Tongren City	同仁市	Huangnan	Qinghai	City	3,195	92,601	632301	-
Jainca County	尖扎县	Huangnan	Qinghai	County	1,557.85	55,325	632322	JAI
Zêkog County	泽库县	Huangnan	Qinghai	County	6,773.37	69,416	632323	ZEK
Henan Mongol Autonomous County	河南蒙古族自治县	Huangnan	Qinghai	Autonomous county (Mongol)	6,700.23	39,374	632324	HNM
Gonghe County	共和县	Hainan	Qinghai	County	16,626.73	122,966	632521	GHE
Tongde County	同德县	Hainan	Qinghai	County	4,652.8	64,367	632522	TDX
Guide County	贵德县	Hainan	Qinghai	County	3,510.37	101,771	632533	GID
Xinghai County	兴海县	Hainan	Qinghai	County	12,177.63	76,025	632524	XHA
Guinan County	贵南县	Hainan	Qinghai	County	6,485.71	76,560	632525	GNN
Maqên County	玛沁县	Golog	Qinghai	County	13,460.12	51,245	632621	MAQ
Banma County	班玛县	Golog	Qinghai	County	6,376	27,185	632622	BMX
Gadê County	甘德县	Golog	Qinghai	County	7,130.71	34,840	632623	GAD
Darlag County	达日县	Golog	Qinghai	County	14,485.21	30,995	632624	TAR
Jigzhi County	久治县	Golog	Qinghai	County	8,279.2	26,081	632625	JUZ
Madoi County	玛多县	Golog	Qinghai	County	24,494.12	11,336	632626	MAD
Yushu City	玉树市	Yushu	Qinghai	City	13,462	120,447	632701	YSC
Zadoi County	杂多县	Yushu	Qinghai	County	35,000	58,268	632722	ZAD
Chindu County	称多县	Yushu	Qinghai	County	15,300	55,619	632723	CHI
Zhidoi County	治多县	Yushu	Qinghai	County	80,200	30,037	632724	ZHI
Nangqên County	囊谦县	Yushu	Qinghai	County	12,741	85,825	632725	NQN
Qumarlêb County	曲麻莱县	Yushu	Qinghai	County	47,000	28,243	632726	QUM
Golmud City	格尔木市	Haixi	Qinghai	City	124,500	215,213	632801	GOS
Delingha City	德令哈市	Haixi	Qinghai	City	27,700	78,184	632802	DEL
Mangnai City	茫崖市	Haixi	Qinghai	City	49,900	31,017	632803	-
Ulan County	乌兰县	Haixi	Qinghai	County	12,249.76	38,273	632821	ULA
Dulan County	都兰县	Haixi	Qinghai	County	45,264.61	76,623	632822	DUL
Tianjun County	天峻县	Haixi	Qinghai	County	25,612.63	33,923	632823	TJN
Da Qaidam Administrative Zone	大柴旦行政区	Haixi	Qinghai	Administrative committee	21,000	13,671	632857	-
Xincheng	新城区	Xi'an	Shaanxi	District		589,739	610102	XCK
Beilin	碑林区	Xi'an	Shaanxi	District		614,710	610103	BLQ
Lianhu	莲湖区	Xi'an	Shaanxi	District		698,513	610104	LHU
Baqiao	灞桥区	Xi'an	Shaanxi	District		595,124	610111	BQQ
Weiyang	未央区	Xi'an	Shaanxi	District		806,811	610112	WYA
Yanta	雁塔区	Xi'an	Shaanxi	District		1,178,529	610113	YTA
Yanliang	阎良区	Xi'an	Shaanxi	District		278,604	610114	YLQ
Lintong	临潼区	Xi'an	Shaanxi	District		655,874	610115	LTG
Chang'an	长安区	Xi'an	Shaanxi	District		1,083,285	610116	CAU
Lantian	蓝田县	Xi'an	Shaanxi	County		514,026	610122	LNT
Zhouzhi	周至县	Xi'an	Shaanxi	County		562,768	610124	ZOZ
Gaoling	高陵区	Xi'an	Shaanxi	District		333,477	610117	GLI
Huyi	鄠邑区	Xi'an	Shaanxi	District		556,377	610118	HYD
Yaozhou	耀州区	Tongchuan	Shaanxi	District		200,230	610204	YAO
Yintai	印台区	Tongchuan	Shaanxi	District		217,509	610203	YIT
Wangyi	王益区	Tongchuan	Shaanxi	District		325,538	610202	WAY
Yijun	宜君县	Tongchuan	Shaanxi	County		91,160	610222	YJU
Weibin	渭滨区	Baoji	Shaanxi	District		448,189	610302	WBQ
Jintai	金台区	Baoji	Shaanxi	District		394,538	610303	JTQ
Chencang	陈仓区	Baoji	Shaanxi	District		595,075	610304	CCU
Fengxiang	凤翔区	Baoji	Shaanxi	District		483,471	610305	FXG
Qishan	岐山县	Baoji	Shaanxi	County		459,064	610323	QIS
Fufeng	扶风县	Baoji	Shaanxi	County		416,398	610324	FFG
Mei(xian)	眉县	Baoji	Shaanxi	County		299,988	610326	MEI
Long(xian)	陇县	Baoji	Shaanxi	County		248,901	610327	LON
Qianyang	千阳县	Baoji	Shaanxi	County		123,959	610328	QNY
Linyou	麟游县	Baoji	Shaanxi	County		90,728	610329	LYP
Feng(xian)	凤县	Baoji	Shaanxi	County		105,492	610330	FEG
Taibai	太白县	Baoji	Shaanxi	County		50,928	610331	TBA
Qindu	秦都区	Xianyang	Shaanxi	District		507,093	610402	QDU
Yangling	杨陵区	Xianyang	Shaanxi	District		201,172	610403	YGL
Weicheng	渭城区	Xianyang	Shaanxi	District		438,327	610404	WIC
Sanyuan	三原县	Xianyang	Shaanxi	County		403,529	610422	SYN
Jingyang	泾阳县	Xianyang	Shaanxi	County		487,749	610423	JGY
Qian(xian)	乾县	Xianyang	Shaanxi	County		527,088	610424	QIA
Liquan	礼泉县	Xianyang	Shaanxi	County		447,771	610425	LIQ
Yongshou	永寿县	Xianyang	Shaanxi	County		184,642	610426	YSH
Binzhou	彬州市	Xianyang	Shaanxi	City		323,256	610482	
Changwu	长武县	Xianyang	Shaanxi	County		167,570	610428	CWU
Xunyi	旬邑县	Xianyang	Shaanxi	County		261,566	610429	XNY
Chunhua	淳化县	Xianyang	Shaanxi	County		193,377	610430	CHU
Wugong	武功县	Xianyang	Shaanxi	County		411,312	610431	WGG
Xingping	兴平市	Xianyang	Shaanxi	City		541,554	610481	XPG
Linwei	临渭区	Weinan	Shaanxi	District		877,142	610502	LWE
Huazhou	华州区	Weinan	Shaanxi	District		322,148	610503	HZL
Tongguan	潼关县	Weinan	Shaanxi	County		155,463	610522	TGN
Dali	大荔县	Weinan	Shaanxi	County		693,392	610523	DAL
Heyang	合阳县	Weinan	Shaanxi	County		436,441	610524	HYK
Chengcheng	澄城县	Weinan	Shaanxi	County		386,150	610525	CCG
Pucheng	蒲城县	Weinan	Shaanxi	County		743,000	610526	PUC
Baishui	白水县	Weinan	Shaanxi	County		279,679	610527	BSU
Fuping	富平县	Weinan	Shaanxi	County		743,385	610528	FPX
Hancheng	韩城市	Weinan	Shaanxi	City		391,164	610581	HCE
Huayin	华阴市	Weinan	Shaanxi	City		258,113	610582	HYI
Baota	宝塔区	Yan'an	Shaanxi	District		475,234	610602	BTA
Yanchang	延长县	Yan'an	Shaanxi	County		125,391	610621	YCA
Yanchuan	延川县	Yan'an	Shaanxi	County		168,375	610622	YCT
Zichang	子长市	Yan'an	Shaanxi	City		216,910	610681	
Ansai	安塞区	Yan'an	Shaanxi	District		171,552	610603	ASI
Zhidan	志丹县	Yan'an	Shaanxi	County		140,489	610625	ZDN
Wuqi	吴起县	Yan'an	Shaanxi	County		145,061	610626	WQI
Ganquan	甘泉县	Yan'an	Shaanxi	County		77,188	610627	GQN
Fu(xian)	富县	Yan'an	Shaanxi	County		149,727	610628	FUX
Luochuan	洛川县	Yan'an	Shaanxi	County		220,684	610629	LCW
Yichuan	宜川县	Yan'an	Shaanxi	County		117,203	610630	YIC
Huanglong	黄龙县	Yan'an	Shaanxi	County		49,392	610631	HGL
Huangling	黄陵县	Yan'an	Shaanxi	County		129,803	610632	HLG
Hantai	汉台区	Hanzhong	Shaanxi	District		534,923	610702	HTQ
Nanzheng	南郑区	Hanzhong	Shaanxi	District		471,634	610703	
Chenggu	城固县	Hanzhong	Shaanxi	County		464,903	610722	CGU
Yang(xian)	洋县	Hanzhong	Shaanxi	County		383,981	610723	YGX
Xixiang	西乡县	Hanzhong	Shaanxi	County		341,812	610724	XXA
Mian(xian)	勉县	Hanzhong	Shaanxi	County		388,123	610725	MIA
Ningqiang	宁强县	Hanzhong	Shaanxi	County		308,885	610726	NQG
Lueyang	略阳县	Hanzhong	Shaanxi	County		201,645	610727	LYC
Zhenba	镇巴县	Hanzhong	Shaanxi	County		246,817	610728	ZBA
Liuba	留坝县	Hanzhong	Shaanxi	County		43,398	610729	LBA
Foping	佛坪县	Hanzhong	Shaanxi	County		30,075	610730	FPG
Yuyang	榆阳区	Yulin	Shaanxi	District		637,617	610802	YNU
Shenmu	神木市	Yulin	Shaanxi	City		455,493	610881	SMA
Fugu	府谷县	Yulin	Shaanxi	County		260,585	610822	FGU
Hengshan	横山区	Yulin	Shaanxi	District		288,053	610803	HSB
Jingbian	靖边县	Yulin	Shaanxi	County		355,939	610824	JBN
Dingbian	定边县	Yulin	Shaanxi	County		319,370	610825	DBN
Suide	绥德县	Yulin	Shaanxi	County		296,088	610826	SDE
Mizhi	米脂县	Yulin	Shaanxi	County		154,953	610827	MZH
Jia(xian)	佳县	Yulin	Shaanxi	County		204,666	610828	JXN
Wubu	吴堡县	Yulin	Shaanxi	County		75,748	610829	WBU
Qingjian	清涧县	Yulin	Shaanxi	County		128,938	610830	QJN
Zizhou	子洲县	Yulin	Shaanxi	County		173,987	610831	ZZH
Hanbin	汉滨区	Ankang	Shaanxi	District		870,126	610902	HBU
Hanyin	汉阴县	Ankang	Shaanxi	County		246,147	610921	HYY
Shiquan	石泉县	Ankang	Shaanxi	County		171,097	610922	SQN
Ningshan	宁陕县	Ankang	Shaanxi	County		70,435	610923	NGS
Ziyang	紫阳县	Ankang	Shaanxi	County		283,947	610924	ZYG
Langao	岚皋县	Ankang	Shaanxi	County		154,157	610925	LNG
Pingli	平利县	Ankang	Shaanxi	County		192,959	610926	PLX
Zhenping	镇坪县	Ankang	Shaanxi	County		50,966	610927	ZNP
Baihe	白河县	Ankang	Shaanxi	County		163,395	610929	BHE
Xunyang	旬阳市	Ankang	Shaanxi	City		426,677	610981	XYS
Shangzhou	商州区	Shangluo	Shaanxi	District		531,646	611002	SZO
Luonan	洛南县	Shangluo	Shaanxi	County		441,643	611021	LNK
Danfeng	丹凤县	Shangluo	Shaanxi	County		295,424	611022	DNF
Shangnan	商南县	Shangluo	Shaanxi	County		221,564	611023	SNN
Shanyang	山阳县	Shangluo	Shaanxi	County		422,255	611024	SNY
Zhen'an	镇安县	Shangluo	Shaanxi	County		275,862	611025	ZNA
Zhashui	柞水县	Shangluo	Shaanxi	County		153,348	611026	ZSU
Lixia	历下区	Jinan	Shandong	District		754,100	370102	LXQ
Shizhong	市中区	Jinan	Shandong	District		713,600	370103	SZQ
Huaiyin	槐荫区	Jinan	Shandong	District		476,800	370104	HYF
Tianqiao	天桥区	Jinan	Shandong	District		688,400	370105	TQQ
Licheng	历城区	Jinan	Shandong	District		1,124,300	370112	LCZ
Changqing	长清区	Jinan	Shandong	District		578,700	370113	CQG
Pingyin	平阴县	Jinan	Shandong	County		331,700	370124	PYL
Shanghe	商河县	Jinan	Shandong	County		564,100	370126	SGH
Zhangqiu	章丘区	Jinan	Shandong	District		1,064,200	370114	ZQN
Jiyang	济阳区	Jinan	Shandong	District		517,900	370115	
Laiwu	莱芜区	Jinan	Shandong	District		989,500	370116	
Gangcheng	钢城区	Jinan	Shandong	District		309,000	370117	
Shinan	市南区	Qingdao	Shandong	District		544,800	370202	SNQ
Shibei	市北区	Qingdao	Shandong	District		558,200	370203	SBQ
Licang	李沧区	Qingdao	Shandong	District		512,400	370213	LCT
Huangdao	黄岛区	Qingdao	Shandong	District		524,200	370211	HDO
Laoshan	崂山区	Qingdao	Shandong	District		379,500	370212	LQD
Chengyang	城阳区	Qingdao	Shandong	District		737,200	370214	CEY
Jiaozhou	胶州市	Qingdao	Shandong	City		843,100	370281	JZS
Pingdu	平度市	Qingdao	Shandong	City		1,357,400	370283	PDU
Laixi	莱西市	Qingdao	Shandong	City		750,200	370285	LXE
Jimo	即墨区	Qingdao	Shandong	District		1,177,200	370215	
Zichuan	淄川区	Zibo	Shandong	District		731,900	370302	ZCQ
Zhangdian	张店区	Zibo	Shandong	District		929,200	370303	ZDQ
Boshan	博山区	Zibo	Shandong	District		463,000	370304	BSZ
Linzi	临淄区	Zibo	Shandong	District		642,800	370305	LZQ
Zhoucun	周村区	Zibo	Shandong	District		362,300	370306	ZCN
Huantai	桓台县	Zibo	Shandong	County		504,000	370321	HTL
Gaoqing	高青县	Zibo	Shandong	County		347,900	370322	GQG
Yiyuan	沂源县	Zibo	Shandong	County		549,500	370323	YIY
Shizhong	市中区	Zaozhuang	Shandong	District		535,500	370402	SZZ
Yicheng	峄城区	Zaozhuang	Shandong	District		364,200	370403	XEC
Xuecheng	薛城区	Zaozhuang	Shandong	District		481,400	370404	YZZ
Tai'erzhuang	台儿庄区	Zaozhuang	Shandong	District		279,500	370405	TEZ
Shanting	山亭区	Zaozhuang	Shandong	District		465,000	370406	STG
Tengzhou	滕州市	Zaozhuang	Shandong	City		1,603,700	370481	TZO
Dongying	东营区	Dongying	Shandong	District		756,700	370502	DYQ
Hekou	河口区	Dongying	Shandong	District		247,600	370503	HKO
Kenli	垦利区	Dongying	Shandong	County		242,300	370505	KEL
Lijin	利津县	Dongying	Shandong	County		281,200	370522	LJN
Guangrao	广饶县	Dongying	Shandong	County		507,500	370523	GRO
Zhifu	芝罘区	Yantai	Shandong	District		830,200	370602	ZFQ
Fushan	福山区	Yantai	Shandong	District		644,800	370611	FUS
Muping	牟平区	Yantai	Shandong	District		467,600	370612	MPQ
Laishan	莱山区	Yantai	Shandong	District		285,100	370613	LYT
Longkou	龙口市	Yantai	Shandong	City		688,300	370681	LKU
Laiyang	莱阳市	Yantai	Shandong	City		878,600	370682	LYD
Laizhou	莱州市	Yantai	Shandong	City		883,900	370683	LZG
Penglai	蓬莱区	Yantai	Shandong	District		451,100	370614	
Zhaoyuan	招远市	Yantai	Shandong	City		566,200	370685	ZYL
Qixia	栖霞市	Yantai	Shandong	City		589,700	370686	QXS
Haiyang	海阳市	Yantai	Shandong	City		638,700	370687	HYL
Weicheng	潍城区	Weifang	Shandong	District		415,100	370702	WCG
Hanting	寒亭区	Weifang	Shandong	District		424,100	370703	HNT
Fangzi	坊子区	Weifang	Shandong	District		512,200	370704	FZQ
Kuiwen	奎文区	Weifang	Shandong	District		525,900	370705	KWN
Linqu	临朐县	Weifang	Shandong	County		834,300	370724	LNQ
Changle	昌乐县	Weifang	Shandong	County		615,900	370725	CLX
Qingzhou	青州市	Weifang	Shandong	City		940,400	370781	QGZ
Zhucheng	诸城市	Weifang	Shandong	City		1086,200	370782	ZCL
Shouguang	寿光市	Weifang	Shandong	City		1,139,400	370783	SGG
Anqiu	安丘市	Weifang	Shandong	City		926,900	370784	AQU
Gaomi	高密市	Weifang	Shandong	City		895,600	370785	GMI
Changyi	昌邑市	Weifang	Shandong	City		603,500	370786	CYL
Rencheng	任城区	Jining	Shandong	District		526,400	370811	RCQ
Yanzhou	兖州区	Jining	Shandong	District		744,200	370812	YZN
Weishan	微山县	Jining	Shandong	County		633,400	370826	WSA
Yutai	鱼台县	Jining	Shandong	County		437,100	370827	YTL
Jinxiang	金乡县	Jining	Shandong	County		625,300	370828	JXG
Jiaxiang	嘉祥县	Jining	Shandong	County		818,200	370829	JXP
Wenshang	汶上县	Jining	Shandong	County		684,600	370830	WNS
Sishui	泗水县	Jining	Shandong	County		536,100	370831	SSH
Liangshan	梁山县	Jining	Shandong	County		730,700	370832	LSN
Qufu	曲阜市	Jining	Shandong	City		640,500	370881	QFU
Zoucheng	邹城市	Jining	Shandong	City		1,116,700	370883	ZCG
Taishan	泰山区	Tai'an	Shandong	District		760,100	370902	TSQ
Daiyue	岱岳区	Tai'an	Shandong	District		975,400	370911	DYU
Ningyang	宁阳县	Tai'an	Shandong	County		754,600	370921	NGY
Dongping	东平县	Tai'an	Shandong	County		741,600	370923	DPG
Xintai	新泰市	Tai'an	Shandong	City		1,315,900	370982	XTA
Feicheng	肥城市	Tai'an	Shandong	City		946,600	370983	FEC
Huancui	环翠区	Weihai	Shandong	District		908,200	371002	HNC
Wendeng	文登区	Weihai	Shandong	District		609,700	371003	WDN
Rongcheng	荣成市	Weihai	Shandong	City		714,400	371082	RCS
Rushan	乳山市	Weihai	Shandong	City		572,500	371083	RSN
Donggang	东港区	Rizhao	Shandong	District		920,500	371102	DGR
Lanshan	岚山区	Rizhao	Shandong	District		400,100	371103	LAH
Wulian	五莲县	Rizhao	Shandong	County		484,900	371121	WLN
Ju(xian)	莒县	Rizhao	Shandong	County		995,600	371122	JUX
Lanshan	兰山区	Linyi	Shandong	District		1,274,200	371302	LLS
Luozhuang	罗庄区	Linyi	Shandong	District		660,600	371311	LZU
Hedong	河东区	Linyi	Shandong	District		665,400	371312	HDL
Yinan	沂南县	Linyi	Shandong	County		790,900	371321	YNN
Tancheng	郯城县	Linyi	Shandong	County		838,000	371322	TCE
Yishui	沂水县	Linyi	Shandong	County		998,300	371323	YIS
Lanling	兰陵县	Linyi	Shandong	County		1,161,900	371324	LLA
Fei(xian)	费县	Linyi	Shandong	County		757,000	371325	FEI
Pingyi	平邑县	Linyi	Shandong	County		900,100	371326	PYI
Junan	莒南县	Linyi	Shandong	County		886,400	371327	JNB
Mengyin	蒙阴县	Linyi	Shandong	County		489,500	371328	MYL
Linshu	临沭县	Linyi	Shandong	County		617,100	371329	LSP
Decheng	德城区	Dezhou	Shandong	District		679,600	371402	DCD
Lingcheng	陵城区	Dezhou	Shandong	District		569,000	371403	LDZ
Ningjin	宁津县	Dezhou	Shandong	County		449,900	371422	NGJ
Qingyun	庆云县	Dezhou	Shandong	County		294,700	371423	QYL
Linyi	临邑县	Dezhou	Shandong	County		511,100	371424	LYM
Qihe	齐河县	Dezhou	Shandong	County		602,000	371425	QIH
Pingyuan	平原县	Dezhou	Shandong	County		442,900	371426	PYN
Xiajin	夏津县	Dezhou	Shandong	County		500,500	371427	XAJ
Wucheng	武城县	Dezhou	Shandong	County		376,100	371428	WUC
Laoling	乐陵市	Dezhou	Shandong	City		652,400	371481	LEL
Yucheng	禹城市	Dezhou	Shandong	City		490,000	371482	YCL
Dongchangfu	东昌府区	Liaocheng	Shandong	District		1,229,800	371502	DCF
Chiping	茌平区	Liaocheng	Shandong	District		520,100	371503	YGU
Yanggu	阳谷县	Liaocheng	Shandong	County		770,700	371521	SHN
Shen(xian)	莘县	Liaocheng	Shandong	County		958,800	371522	CPG
Dong'e	东阿县	Liaocheng	Shandong	County		352,600	371524	DGE
Guan(xian)	冠县	Liaocheng	Shandong	County		764,900	371525	GXL
Gaotang	高唐县	Liaocheng	Shandong	County		473,400	371526	GTG
Linqing	临清市	Liaocheng	Shandong	City		719,600	371581	LQS
Bincheng	滨城区	Binzhou	Shandong	District		566,100	371602	BCH
Huimin	惠民县	Binzhou	Shandong	County		602,500	371621	HMN
Yangxin	阳信县	Binzhou	Shandong	County		427,000	371622	YXN
Wudi	无棣县	Binzhou	Shandong	County		418,700	371623	WDI
Boxing	博兴县	Binzhou	Shandong	County		487,100	371625	BOX
Zouping	邹平市	Binzhou	Shandong	City		778,800	371681	
Zhanhua	沾化区	Binzhou	Shandong	District		116,600	371603	ZHN
Mudan	牡丹区	Heze	Shandong	District		1,346,700	371702	MDQ
Cao(xian)	曹县	Heze	Shandong	County		1,365,700	371721	CAO
Shan(xian)	单县	Heze	Shandong	County		1,063,200	371722	SXN
Chengwu	成武县	Heze	Shandong	County		612,000	371723	CWX
Juye	巨野县	Heze	Shandong	County		860,600	371724	JYE
Yuncheng	郓城县	Heze	Shandong	County		1,040,700	371725	YCR
Juancheng	鄄城县	Heze	Shandong	County		721,900	371726	JNC
Dingtao	定陶区	Heze	Shandong	District		565,800	371703	DTN
Dongming	东明县	Heze	Shandong	County		711,100	371728	DMG
Huangpu District	黄浦区	Directly administered	Shanghai	District	18.72	429,891	310101	HGP
Xuhui District	徐汇区	Directly administered	Shanghai	District	54.76	1,085,130	310104	XHI
Changning District	长宁区	Directly administered	Shanghai	District	37.19	690,571	310105	CNQ
Jing'an District	静安区	Directly administered	Shanghai	District	37.37	246,788	310106	JAQ
Putuo District	普陀区	Directly administered	Shanghai	District	55.47	1,288,881	310107	PTQ
Hongkou District	虹口区	Directly administered	Shanghai	District	23.48	852,476	310109	HKQ
Yangpu District	杨浦区	Directly administered	Shanghai	District	60.61	1,313,222	310110	YPU
Minhang District	闵行区	Directly administered	Shanghai	District	371.7	2,429,372	310112	MHQ
Baoshan District	宝山区	Directly administered	Shanghai	District	424.58	1,904,886	310113	BAO
Jiading District	嘉定区	Directly administered	Shanghai	District	463.55	1,471,231	310114	JDG
Pudong New Area	浦东新区	Directly administered	Shanghai	District and New Area	1,210.5	5,044,430	310115	PDX
Jinshan District	金山区	Directly administered	Shanghai	District	586.14	732,410	310116	JSH
Songjiang District	松江区	Directly administered	Shanghai	District	605.64	1,582,398	310117	SOJ
Qingpu District	青浦区	Directly administered	Shanghai	District	675.11	1,081,022	310118	QPU
Fengxian District	奉贤区	Directly administered	Shanghai	District	704.68	1,083,463	310120	FXI
Chongming District	崇明区	Directly administered	Shanghai	District	1,411	703,722	310151	CMG
Xiaodian	小店区	Taiyuan	Shanxi	District		804,537	140105	XDQ
Yingze	迎泽区	Taiyuan	Shanxi	District		601,112	140106	YZT
Xinghualing	杏花岭区	Taiyuan	Shanxi	District		634,482	140107	XHL
Jiancaoping	尖草坪区	Taiyuan	Shanxi	District		415,705	140108	JCP
Wanbailin	万柏林区	Taiyuan	Shanxi	District		749,255	140109	WBL
Jinyuan	晋源区	Taiyuan	Shanxi	District		221,431	140110	JYM
Qingxu	清徐县	Taiyuan	Shanxi	County		343,861	140121	QXU
Yangqu	阳曲县	Taiyuan	Shanxi	County		120,228	140122	YGQ
Loufan	娄烦县	Taiyuan	Shanxi	County		105,841	140123	LFA
Gujiao	古交市	Taiyuan	Shanxi	City		205,139	140181	GUJ
Pingcheng	平城区	Datong	Shanxi	District		723,013	140202	XRQ
Yungang	云冈区	Datong	Shanxi	District		405,864	140211	
Xinrong	新荣区	Datong	Shanxi	District		108,482	140212	
Yanggao	阳高县	Datong	Shanxi	County		272,488	140221	YGO
Tianzhen	天镇县	Datong	Shanxi	County		206,009	140222	TZE
Guangling	广灵县	Datong	Shanxi	County		182,613	140223	GLJ
Lingqiu	灵丘县	Datong	Shanxi	County		234,004	140224	LQX
Hunyuan	浑源县	Datong	Shanxi	County		343,486	140225	HYM
Zuoyun	左云县	Datong	Shanxi	County		156,163	140226	ZUY
Yunzhou	云州区	Datong	Shanxi	District		185,777	140213	
Cheng(qu)	城区	Yangquan	Shanxi	District		193,106	140302	CQU
Kuang(qu)	矿区	Yangquan	Shanxi	District		242,994	140303	KQY
Jiao(qu)	郊区	Yangquan	Shanxi	District		286,055	140311	JQY
Pingding	平定县	Yangquan	Shanxi	County		335,265	140321	PDG
Yu(xian)	盂县	Yangquan	Shanxi	County		311,082	140322	YUX
Luzhou	潞州区	Changzhi	Shanxi	District		483,628	140411	
Shangdang	上党区	Changzhi	Shanxi	District		340,963	140413	
Xiangyuan	屯留区	Changzhi	Shanxi	County		270,216	140414	
Tunliu	襄垣县	Changzhi	Shanxi	County		263,844	140423	XYJ
Pingshun	平顺县	Changzhi	Shanxi	County		150,955	140425	PSX
Licheng	黎城县	Changzhi	Shanxi	County		158,541	140426	LIC
Huguan	壶关县	Changzhi	Shanxi	County		291,609	140427	HGN
Zhangzi	长子县	Changzhi	Shanxi	County		353,266	140428	ZHZ
Wuxiang	武乡县	Changzhi	Shanxi	County		182,548	140429	WXG
Qin(xian)	沁县	Changzhi	Shanxi	County		172,205	140430	QIN
Qinyuan	沁源县	Changzhi	Shanxi	County		158,702	140431	QYU
Lucheng	潞城区t	Changzhi	Shanxi	District		226,874	140412	
Cheng(qu)	城区	Jincheng	Shanxi	District		476,945	140502	CQJ
Qinshui	沁水县	Jincheng	Shanxi	County		213,022	140521	QSI
Yangcheng	阳城县	Jincheng	Shanxi	County		388,788	140522	YGC
Lingchuan	陵川县	Jincheng	Shanxi	County		231,360	140524	LGC
Zezhou	泽州县	Jincheng	Shanxi	County		484,174	140525	ZEZ
Gaoping	高平市	Jincheng	Shanxi	City		484,862	140581	GPG
Shuocheng	朔城区	Shuozhou	Shanxi	District		505,294	140602	SCH
Pinglu	平鲁区	Shuozhou	Shanxi	District		203,793	140603	PLU
Shanyin	山阴县	Shuozhou	Shanxi	County		238,885	140621	SYP
Ying(xian)	应县	Shuozhou	Shanxi	County		327,973	140622	YIG
Youyu	右玉县	Shuozhou	Shanxi	County		112,063	140623	YOY
Huairen	怀仁市	Shuozhou	Shanxi	County		326,849	140681	
Yuci	榆次区	Jinzhong	Shanxi	District		635651	140702	YCI
Yushe	榆社县	Jinzhong	Shanxi	County		134648	140721	YSJ
Zuoquan	左权县	Jinzhong	Shanxi	County		161314	140722	ZQX
Heshun	和顺县	Jinzhong	Shanxi	County		144178	140723	HSJ
Xiyang	昔阳县	Jinzhong	Shanxi	County		227896	140724	XIY
Shouyang	寿阳县	Jinzhong	Shanxi	County		211014	140725	SYJ
Taigu	太谷区	Jinzhong	Shanxi	District		298783	140703	
Qi(xian)	祁县	Jinzhong	Shanxi	County		265310	140727	QIJ
Pingyao	平遥县	Jinzhong	Shanxi	County		502712	140728	PGY
Lingshi	灵石县	Jinzhong	Shanxi	County		261402	140729	LSF
Jiexiu	介休市	Jinzhong	Shanxi	City		406517	140781	JXS
Yanhu	盐湖区	Yuncheng	Shanxi	District		680,043	140802	YAH
Linyi	临猗县	Yuncheng	Shanxi	County		57,251	140821	LYJ
Wanrong	万荣县	Yuncheng	Shanxi	County		439,364	140822	WRG
Wenxi	闻喜县	Yuncheng	Shanxi	County		404,146	140823	WNX
Jishan	稷山县	Yuncheng	Shanxi	County		347,425	140824	JSJ
Xinjiang	新绛县	Yuncheng	Shanxi	County		332,473	140825	XNJ
Jiang(xian)	绛县	Yuncheng	Shanxi	County		281,644	140826	JXC
Yuanqu	垣曲县	Yuncheng	Shanxi	County		231,018	140827	YQU
Xia(xian)	夏县	Yuncheng	Shanxi	County		352,821	140828	XIA
Pinglu	平陆县	Yuncheng	Shanxi	County		258,241	140829	PGL
Ruicheng	芮城县	Yuncheng	Shanxi	County		394,854	140830	RIC
Yongji	永济市	Yuncheng	Shanxi	City		444,724	140881	YJJ
Hejin	河津市	Yuncheng	Shanxi	City		395,531	140882	HJS
Xinfu	忻府区	Xinzhou	Shanxi	District		544,682	140902	XNU
Dingxiang	定襄县	Xinzhou	Shanxi	County		217,468	140921	DXJ
Wutai	五台县	Xinzhou	Shanxi	County		299,390	140922	WTA
Dai(xian)	代县	Xinzhou	Shanxi	County		214,091	140923	DAI
Fanshi	繁峙县	Xinzhou	Shanxi	County		266,800	140924	FSI
Ningwu	宁武县	Xinzhou	Shanxi	County		161,165	140925	NWU
Jingle	静乐县	Xinzhou	Shanxi	County		156,846	140926	JGL
Shenchi	神池县	Xinzhou	Shanxi	County		106,538	140927	SCI
Wuzhai	五寨县	Xinzhou	Shanxi	County		107,632	140928	WZH
Kelan	岢岚县	Xinzhou	Shanxi	County		84,395	140929	KLN
Hequ	河曲县	Xinzhou	Shanxi	County		145,136	140930	HQU
Baode	保德县	Xinzhou	Shanxi	County		160,035	140931	BDE
Pianguan	偏关县	Xinzhou	Shanxi	County		112,111	140932	PGN
Yuanping	原平市	Xinzhou	Shanxi	City		491,213	140981	YUP
Yaodu	尧都区	Linfen	Shanxi	District		944,050	141002	YDJ
Quwo	曲沃县	Linfen	Shanxi	County		237,033	141021	QWO
Yicheng	翼城县	Linfen	Shanxi	County		311,471	141022	YCB
Xiangfen	襄汾县	Linfen	Shanxi	County		442,614	141023	XFJ
Hongtong	洪洞县	Linfen	Shanxi	County		733,421	141024	HTO
Gu(xian)	古县	Linfen	Shanxi	County		91,798	141025	GUX
Anze	安泽县	Linfen	Shanxi	County		82,012	141026	AZE
Fushan	浮山县	Linfen	Shanxi	County		127,831	141027	FSJ
Ji(xian)	吉县	Linfen	Shanxi	County		106,407	141028	JIJ
Xiangning	乡宁县	Linfen	Shanxi	County		233,162	141029	XGN
Pu(xian)	蒲县	Linfen	Shanxi	County		107,339	141033	PUX
Daning	大宁县	Linfen	Shanxi	County		64,501	141030	DNG
Yonghe	永和县	Linfen	Shanxi	County		63,649	141032	YGH
Xi(xian)	隰县	Linfen	Shanxi	County		103,617	141031	XIJ
Fenxi	汾西县	Linfen	Shanxi	County		144,795	141034	FEX
Houma	侯马市	Linfen	Shanxi	City		240,005	141081	HMA
Huozhou	霍州市	Linfen	Shanxi	City		282,907	141082	HOZ
Lishi	离石区	Lüliang	Shanxi	District		320,142	141102	LSW
Wenshui	文水县	Lüliang	Shanxi	County		421,200	141121	WSJ
Jiaocheng	交城县	Lüliang	Shanxi	County		230,522	141122	JCJ
Xing(xian)	兴县	Lüliang	Shanxi	County		279,369	141123	XGX
Lin(xian)	临县	Lüliang	Shanxi	County		579,069	141124	LXN
Liulin	柳林县	Lüliang	Shanxi	County		320,681	141125	LUL
Shilou	石楼县	Lüliang	Shanxi	County		111,814	141126	SLO
Lan(xian)	岚县	Lüliang	Shanxi	County		174,180	141127	LAN
Fangshan	方山县	Lüliang	Shanxi	County		143,809	141128	FGS
Zhongyang	中阳县	Lüliang	Shanxi	County		141,374	141129	ZHY
Jiaokou	交口县	Lüliang	Shanxi	County		119,919	141130	JKO
Xiaoyi	孝义市	Lüliang	Shanxi	City		468,766	141181	XOY
Fenyang	汾阳市	Lüliang	Shanxi	City		416,212	141182	FYJ
Jinjiang District	锦江区	Chengdu	Sichuan	District	62.12	690,422	510104	JJQ
Qingyang District	青羊区	Chengdu	Sichuan	District	67.78	828,140	510105	QYQ
Jinniu District	金牛区	Chengdu	Sichuan	District	108	1,754,201	510106	JNU
Wuhou District	武侯区	Chengdu	Sichuan	District	76.56	1,083,806	510107	WHQ
Chenghua District	成华区	Chengdu	Sichuan	District	110.6	938,785	510108	CHQ
Longquanyi District	龙泉驿区	Chengdu	Sichuan	District	556	767,203	510112	LQY
Qingbaijiang District	青白江区	Chengdu	Sichuan	District	378.94	381,792	510113	QBJ
Xindu District	新都区	Chengdu	Sichuan	District	497	775,703	510114	XDU
Wenjiang District	温江区	Chengdu	Sichuan	District	277	457,070	510115	WNJ
Shuangliu District	双流区	Chengdu	Sichuan	District	1,032	1,158,516	510116	SLA
Pidu District	郫都区	Chengdu	Sichuan	District	437.5	756,047	510117	PID
Xinjin District	新津区	Chengdu	Sichuan	District	330	302,199	510118	-
Jintang County	金堂县	Chengdu	Sichuan	County	1,156	717,225	510121	JNT
Dayi County	大邑县	Chengdu	Sichuan	County	1,548	502,198	510129	DYI
Pujiang County	蒲江县	Chengdu	Sichuan	County	580	239,562	510131	PJX
Dujiangyan City	都江堰市	Chengdu	Sichuan	City	1,208	657,996	510181	DJY
Pengzhou City	彭州市	Chengdu	Sichuan	City	1,420	762,887	510182	PZS
Qionglai City	邛崃市	Chengdu	Sichuan	City	1,384	612,753	510183	QLA
Chongzhou City	崇州市	Chengdu	Sichuan	City	1,090	661,120	510184	CZO
Jianyang City	简阳市	Chengdu	Sichuan	City	2,215	1,481,180	510185	JYC
Ziliujing District	自流井区	Zigong	Sichuan	District	153	346,401	510302	ZLJ
Gongjing District	贡井区	Zigong	Sichuan	District	417.63	260,607	510303	GJQ
Da'an District	大安区	Zigong	Sichuan	District	398.81	382,245	510304	DAQ
Yantan District	沿滩区	Zigong	Sichuan	District	467.99	272,809	510311	YTN
Rong County	荣县	Zigong	Sichuan	County	1,598.97	590,640	510321	RGX
Fushun County	富顺县	Zigong	Sichuan	County	1,336.26	826,196	510322	FSH
Dong District	东区	Panzhihua	Sichuan	District	167.23	364,326	510402	DQP
Xi District	西区	Panzhihua	Sichuan	District	124	162,557	510403	XIQ
Renhe District	仁和区	Panzhihua	Sichuan	District	1,727	260,294	510411	RHQ
Miyi County	米易县	Panzhihua	Sichuan	County	2,153	219,227	510421	MIY
Yanbian County	盐边县	Panzhihua	Sichuan	County	3,269	207,717	510422	YBN
Jiangyang District	江阳区	Luzhou	Sichuan	District	649	575,233	510502	JYB
Naxi District	纳溪区	Luzhou	Sichuan	District	1,150.6	451,401	510503	NXI
Longmatan District	龙马潭区	Luzhou	Sichuan	District	340.8	344,601	510504	LMT
Lu County	泸县	Luzhou	Sichuan	County	1,532	840,336	510521	LUX
Hejiang County	合江县	Luzhou	Sichuan	County	2,422	709,473	510522	HEJ
Xuyong County	叙永县	Luzhou	Sichuan	County	2,977	584,299	510524	XYO
Gulin County	古蔺县	Luzhou	Sichuan	County	3,184	713,083	510525	GUL
Jingyang District	旌阳区	Deyang	Sichuan	District	684	735,070	510603	JYF
Luojiang District	罗江区	Deyang	Sichuan	District	447.88	212,186	510604	
Zhongjiang County	中江县	Deyang	Sichuan	County	2,063	1,186,762	510623	ZGJ
Guanghan City	广汉市	Deyang	Sichuan	City	538	591,115	510681	GHN
Shifang City	什邡市	Deyang	Sichuan	City	863	412,758	510682	SFS
Mianzhu City	绵竹市	Deyang	Sichuan	City	1,245	477,868	510683	MZU
Fucheng District	涪城区	Mianyang	Sichuan	District	597.7	866,727	510703	FCM
Youxian District	游仙区	Mianyang	Sichuan	District	973	488,604	510704	YXM
Anzhou District	安州区	Mianyang	Sichuan	District	1,404	366,802	510705	AZU
Santai County	三台县	Mianyang	Sichuan	County	2,660.58	1,042,064	510722	SNT
Yanting County	盐亭县	Mianyang	Sichuan	County	1,648	417,221	510723	YTC
Zitong County	梓潼县	Mianyang	Sichuan	County	1,438	302,246	510725	ZTG
Beichuan Qiang Autonomous County	北川羌族自治县	Mianyang	Sichuan	Autonomous county (Qiang)	3,112	197,108	510726	BCN
Pingwu County	平武县	Mianyang	Sichuan	County	5,974	170,959	510727	PWU
Jiangyou City	江油市	Mianyang	Sichuan	City	2,719	762,142	510781	JYO
Lizhou	利州区	Guangyuan	Sichuan	District		516,424	510802	LZS
Zhaohua	昭化区	Guangyuan	Sichuan	District		168,489	510811	ZHO
Chaotian	朝天区	Guangyuan	Sichuan	District		174,333	510812	CTN
Wangcang	旺苍县	Guangyuan	Sichuan	County		385,787	510821	WGC
Qingchuan	青川县	Guangyuan	Sichuan	County		222,253	510822	QCX
Jiange	剑阁县	Guangyuan	Sichuan	County		457,656	510823	JGE
Cangxi	苍溪县	Guangyuan	Sichuan	County		559,181	510824	CXC
Chuanshan	船山区	Suining	Sichuan	District		656,760	510903	CUS
Anju	安居区	Suining	Sichuan	District		639,125	510904	AJQ
Pengxi	蓬溪县	Suining	Sichuan	County		553,239	510921	PXI
Daying	大英县	Suining	Sichuan	County		478,896	510923	SHE
Shehong	射洪市	Suining	Sichuan	City		924,531	510981	DAY
Shizhong	市中区	Neijiang	Sichuan	District		501,285	511002	SZM
Dongxing	东兴区	Neijiang	Sichuan	District		749,810	511011	DXQ
Weiyuan	威远县	Neijiang	Sichuan	County		626,482	511024	WYU
Zizhong	资中县	Neijiang	Sichuan	County		1,192,060	511025	ZZC
Longchang	隆昌市	Neijiang	Sichuan	City		633,210	511081	LCZ
Shizhong	市中区	Leshan	Sichuan	District		662,812	511102	SZP
Shawan	沙湾区	Leshan	Sichuan	District		187,180	511111	SWN
Wutongqiao	五通桥区	Leshan	Sichuan	District		312,086	511112	WTQ
Jinkouhe	金口河区	Leshan	Sichuan	District		49,157	511113	JKH
Qianwei	犍为县	Leshan	Sichuan	County		434,409	511123	QWE
Jingyan	井研县	Leshan	Sichuan	County		282,222	511124	JYA
Jiajiang	夹江县	Leshan	Sichuan	County		338,345	511126	JJC
Muchuan	沐川县	Leshan	Sichuan	County		216,737	511129	MCH
Ebian Yi Autonomous County	峨边彝族自治县	Leshan	Sichuan	Autonomous county (Yi)		139,210	511132	EBN
Mabian Yi Autonomous County	马边彝族自治县	Leshan	Sichuan	Autonomous county (Yi)		176,530	511133	MBN
Emeishan	峨眉山市	Leshan	Sichuan	City		437,068	511181	EMS
Shunqing	顺庆区	Nanchong	Sichuan	District		635,999	511302	SQG
Gaoping	高坪区	Nanchong	Sichuan	District		585,769	511303	GPQ
Jialing	嘉陵区	Nanchong	Sichuan	District		691,489	511304	JLG
Nanbu	南部县	Nanchong	Sichuan	County		1,275,748	511321	NBU
Yingshan	营山县	Nanchong	Sichuan	County		926,940	511322	YGS
Peng'an	蓬安县	Nanchong	Sichuan	County		702,336	511323	PGA
Yilong	仪陇县	Nanchong	Sichuan	County		1,088,266	511324	YLC
Xichong	西充县	Nanchong	Sichuan	County		643,818	511325	XCO
Langzhong	阆中市	Nanchong	Sichuan	City		870,708	511381	LZJ
Dongpo	东坡区	Meishan	Sichuan	District		840,909	511402	DPQ
Pengshan	彭山区	Meishan	Sichuan	District		329,777	511403	PSQ
Renshou	仁寿县	Meishan	Sichuan	County		1,571,112	511421	RSO
Hongya	洪雅县	Meishan	Sichuan	County		343,321	511423	HGY
Danling	丹棱县	Meishan	Sichuan	County		163,032	511424	DLG
Qingshen	青神县	Meishan	Sichuan	County		197,029	511425	QSC
Cuiping	翠屏区	Yibin	Sichuan	District		836,383	511502	CPQ
Nanxi	南溪区	Yibin	Sichuan	District		335,805	511503	NXA
Xuzhou	叙州县	Yibin	Sichuan	County		813,057	511504	
Jiang'an	江安县	Yibin	Sichuan	County		399,829	511523	JAC
Changning	长宁县	Yibin	Sichuan	County		340,016	511524	CNX
Gao(xian)	高县	Yibin	Sichuan	County		411,118	511525	GAO
Gong(xian)	珙县	Yibin	Sichuan	County		379,798	511526	GOG
Junlian	筠连县	Yibin	Sichuan	County		329,056	511527	JNL
Xingwen	兴文县	Yibin	Sichuan	County		377,162	511528	XWC
Pingshan	屏山县	Yibin	Sichuan	County		249,777	511529	PSC
Guang'an	广安区	Guang'an	Sichuan	District		858,159	511602	GAQ
Qianfeng	前锋区	Guang'an	Sichuan	District		not established	511603	QFQ
Yuechi	岳池县	Guang'an	Sichuan	County		778,639	511621	YCC
Wusheng	武胜县	Guang'an	Sichuan	County		585,624	511622	WSG
Linshui	邻水县	Guang'an	Sichuan	County		704,695	511623	LSH
Huaying	华蓥市	Guang'an	Sichuan	City		278,359	511681	HYC
Tongchuan	通川区	Dazhou	Sichuan	District		478,276	511702	TCQ
Dachuan	达川区	Dazhou	Sichuan	District		1,111,159	511703	DCN
Xuanhan	宣汉县	Dazhou	Sichuan	County		1,006,826	511722	XHC
Kaijiang	开江县	Dazhou	Sichuan	County		430,878	511723	KJG
Dazhu	大竹县	Dazhou	Sichuan	County		876,884	511724	DZU
Qu(xian)	渠县	Dazhou	Sichuan	County		1,156,476	511725	QXC
Wanyuan	万源市	Dazhou	Sichuan	City		407,593	511781	WYS
Yucheng	雨城区	Ya'an	Sichuan	District		355,572	511802	YEU
Mingshan	名山区	Ya'an	Sichuan	District		256,484	511803	MSG
Yingjing	荥经县	Ya'an	Sichuan	County		147,955	511822	YJC
Hanyuan	汉源县	Ya'an	Sichuan	County		324,408	511823	HAY
Shimian	石棉县	Ya'an	Sichuan	County		123,600	511824	SIM
Tianquan	天全县	Ya'an	Sichuan	County		134,156	511825	TQU
Lushan	芦山县	Ya'an	Sichuan	County		109,029	511826	LSC
Baoxing	宝兴县	Ya'an	Sichuan	County		56,060	511827	BXC
Bazhou	巴州区	Bazhong	Sichuan	District		1,126,790	511902	BZU
Enyang	恩阳区	Bazhong	Sichuan	District		not established	511903	EYG
Tongjiang	通江县	Bazhong	Sichuan	County		687,369	511921	TGJ
Nanjiang	南江县	Bazhong	Sichuan	County		606,992	511922	NJC
Pingchang	平昌县	Bazhong	Sichuan	County		862,620	511923	PCG
Yanjiang	雁江区	Ziyang	Sichuan	District		905,729	512002	YIU
Lezhi	乐至县	Ziyang	Sichuan	County		546,773	512021	AYU
Anyue	安岳县	Ziyang	Sichuan	County		1,141,347	512022	LZC
Wenchuan	汶川县	Ngawa	Sichuan	County		100,776	513221	WNC
Li(xian)	理县	Ngawa	Sichuan	County		46,556	513222	LXC
Mao(xian)	茂县	Ngawa	Sichuan	County		104,829	513223	MAO
Songpan	松潘县	Ngawa	Sichuan	County		72,309	513224	SOP
Jiuzhaigou	九寨沟县	Ngawa	Sichuan	County		81,394	513225	JZG
Jinchuan	金川县	Ngawa	Sichuan	County		65,976	513226	JCH
Xiaojin	小金县	Ngawa	Sichuan	County		77,731	513227	XJX
Heishui	黑水县	Ngawa	Sichuan	County		60,704	513228	HIS
Barkam	马尔康市	Ngawa	Sichuan	City		58,437	513201	BKM
Zamthang	壤塘县	Ngawa	Sichuan	County		39,173	513230	ZAM
Ngawa	阿坝县	Ngawa	Sichuan	County		72,391	513231	ABX
Zoigê	若尔盖县	Ngawa	Sichuan	County		74,619	513232	ZOI
Hongyuan	红原县	Ngawa	Sichuan	County		43,818	513233	HOY
Kangding	康定市	Garzê	Sichuan	City		130,142	513301	KDG
Luding	泸定县	Garzê	Sichuan	County		83,386	513322	LUD
Danba	丹巴县	Garzê	Sichuan	County		59,696	513323	DBA
Jiulong	九龙县	Garzê	Sichuan	County		62,133	513324	JLC
Yajiang	雅江县	Garzê	Sichuan	County		50,225	513325	YAJ
Dawu	道孚县	Garzê	Sichuan	County		55,396	513326	DAW
Luhuo	炉霍县	Garzê	Sichuan	County		46,558	513327	LUH
Garzê	甘孜县	Garzê	Sichuan	County		68,523	513328	GRZ
Xinlong	新龙县	Garzê	Sichuan	County		50,393	513329	XLG
Dêgê	德格县	Garzê	Sichuan	County		81,503	513330	DEG
Baiyü	白玉县	Garzê	Sichuan	County		56,290	513331	BYC
Sêrxü	石渠县	Garzê	Sichuan	County		80,834	513332	SER
Sêrtar	色达县	Garzê	Sichuan	County		58,606	513333	STX
Litang	理塘县	Garzê	Sichuan	County		69,046	513334	LIT
Batang	巴塘县	Garzê	Sichuan	County		48,649	513335	BTC
Xiangcheng	乡城县	Garzê	Sichuan	County		33,170	513336	XCC
Daocheng	稻城县	Garzê	Sichuan	County		31,113	513337	DCX
Dêrong	得荣县	Garzê	Sichuan	County		26,209	513338	DER
Xichang	西昌市	Liangshan	Sichuan	City		712,434	513401	XCA
Yanyuan	盐源县	Liangshan	Sichuan	County		350,176	513423	YYU
Dechang	德昌县	Liangshan	Sichuan	County		214,405	513424	DEC
Huili	会理市	Liangshan	Sichuan	City		430,066	513402	HLI
Huidong	会东县	Liangshan	Sichuan	County		362,944	513426	HDG
Ningnan	宁南县	Liangshan	Sichuan	County		170,673	513427	NIN
Puge	普格县	Liangshan	Sichuan	County		155,740	513428	PGE
Butuo	布拖县	Liangshan	Sichuan	County		160,151	513429	BTO
Jinyang	金阳县	Liangshan	Sichuan	County		165,121	513430	JYW
Zhaojue	昭觉县	Liangshan	Sichuan	County		251,836	513431	ZJE
Xide	喜德县	Liangshan	Sichuan	County		165,906	513432	XDE
Mianning	冕宁县	Liangshan	Sichuan	County		351,245	513433	MNG
Yuexi	越西县	Liangshan	Sichuan	County		269,896	513434	YXC
Ganluo	甘洛县	Liangshan	Sichuan	County		195,100	513435	GLO
Meigu	美姑县	Liangshan	Sichuan	County		221,505	513436	MEG
Leibo	雷波县	Liangshan	Sichuan	County		223,885	513437	LBX
Muli Tibetan Autonomous County	木里藏族自治县	Liangshan	Sichuan	Autonomous county (Tibetan)		131,726	513422	MLI
Hualian County	花莲县	Directly administered	Taiwan	County		338,805	-	-
Jiayi County	嘉义县	Directly administered	Taiwan	County		543,248	-	-
Miaoli County	苗栗县	Directly administered	Taiwan	County		560,968	-	-
Nantou County	南投县	Directly administered	Taiwan	County		526,491	-	-
Penghu County	澎湖县	Directly administered	Taiwan	County		96,918	-	-
Pingdong County	屏东县	Directly administered	Taiwan	County		873,509	-	-
Taidong County	台东县	Directly administered	Taiwan	County		230,673	-	-
Xinzhu County	新竹县	Directly administered	Taiwan	County		513,015	-	-
Yilan County	宜兰县	Directly administered	Taiwan	County		460,486	-	-
Yunlin County	云林县	Directly administered	Taiwan	County		717,653	-	-
Zhanghua County	彰化县	Directly administered	Taiwan	County		1,307,286	-	-
Heping District	和平区	Directly administered	Tianjin	District	9.97	273,466	120101	HPG
Hedong District	河东区	Directly administered	Tianjin	District	39	860,852	120102	HDQ
Hexi District	河西区	Directly administered	Tianjin	District	41.24	870,632	120103	HXQ
Nankai District	南开区	Directly administered	Tianjin	District	40.64	1,018,196	120104	NKQ
Hebei District	河北区	Directly administered	Tianjin	District	29.14	788,368	120105	HBQ
Hongqiao District	红桥区	Directly administered	Tianjin	District	21.3	531,526	120106	HQO
Dongli District	东丽区	Directly administered	Tianjin	District	460	569,955	120110	DLI
Xiqing District	西青区	Directly administered	Tianjin	District	545	684,690	120111	XQG
Jinnan District	津南区	Directly administered	Tianjin	District	401	593,063	120112	JNQ
Beichen District	北辰区	Directly administered	Tianjin	District	478	669,031	120113	BCQ
Wuqing District	武清区	Directly administered	Tianjin	District	1,570	949,413	120114	WQQ
Baodi District	宝坻区	Directly administered	Tianjin	District	1,523	799,057	120115	BDI
Binhai New Area	滨海新区	Directly administered	Tianjin	District and New Area	2,270	2,482,065	120116	BHX
Ninghe District	宁河区	Directly administered	Tianjin	District	1,414	416,143	120117	NIH
Jinghai District	静海区	Directly administered	Tianjin	District	1,476	646,978	120118	JHC
Jizhou District	蓟州区	Directly administered	Tianjin	District	1,590	784,789	120119	JZI
Chengguan District	城关区	Lhasa	Tibet	District	525	279,074	540102	CGN
Doilungdêqên District	堆龙德庆区	Lhasa	Tibet	County	2,682	52,249	540103	DLD
Dagzê District	达孜区	Lhasa	Tibet	County	1,373	26,708	540104	-
Lhünzhub County	林周县	Lhasa	Tibet	County	4,512	50,246	540121	LZB
Damxung County	当雄县	Lhasa	Tibet	County	10,036	46,463	540122	DAM
Nyêmo County	尼木县	Lhasa	Tibet	County	3,275	28,149	540123	NYE
Qüxü County	曲水县	Lhasa	Tibet	County	1,624	31,860	540124	QUX
Maizhokunggar County	墨竹工卡县	Lhasa	Tibet	County	5,492	44,674	540127	MAI
Samzhubzê District	桑珠孜区	Shigatse	Tibet	District	3,654	102,894	540202	SAZ
Namling County	南木林县	Shigatse	Tibet	County	8,106	79,909	540221	NAM
Gyantse County	江孜县	Shigatse	Tibet	County	3,849	63,398	540222	GYZ
Tingri County	定日县	Shigatse	Tibet	County	13,861	49,108	540223	TIN
Sa'gya County	萨迦县	Shigatse	Tibet	County	5,748	46,118	540224	SGX
Lhatse County	拉孜县	Shigatse	Tibet	County	4,488	49,575	540225	LAZ
Ngamring County	昂仁县	Shigatse	Tibet	County	28,205	47,195	540226	NGA
Xaitongmoin County	谢通门县	Shigatse	Tibet	County	13,964	43,532	540227	XTM
Bainang County	白朗县	Shigatse	Tibet	County	2,805	44,240	540228	BAI
Rinbung County	仁布县	Shigatse	Tibet	County	2,124	31,288	540229	RIN
Kangmar County	康马县	Shigatse	Tibet	County	6,163	20,912	540230	KAN
Dinggyê County	定结县	Shigatse	Tibet	County	5,834	18,458	540231	
Zhongba County	仲巴县	Shigatse	Tibet	County	43,602	19,493	540232	ZHB
Yadong County	亚东县	Shigatse	Tibet	County	4,240	12,189	540233	YDZ
Gyirong County	吉隆县	Shigatse	Tibet	County	9,019	13,329	540234	GIR
Nyalam County	聂拉木县	Shigatse	Tibet	County	7,863	15,147	540235	NYA
Saga County	萨嘎县	Shigatse	Tibet	County	12,418	12,939	540236	SAG
Kamba County	岗巴县	Shigatse	Tibet	County	4,204	10,047	540237	GAM
Karub District	卡若区	Chamdo	Tibet	District	10,793	87,387	540302	KRO
Jomda County	江达县	Chamdo	Tibet	County	13,159	75,238	540321	JOM
Gonjo County	贡觉县	Chamdo	Tibet	County	6,322	38,741	540322	KON
Riwoche County	类乌齐县	Chamdo	Tibet	County	6,337	40,813	540323	RIW
Dêngqên County	丁青县	Chamdo	Tibet	County	12,368	63,209	540324	DEN
Zhag'yab County	察雅县	Chamdo	Tibet	County	8,255	53,130	540325	CHA
Pasho County	八宿县	Chamdo	Tibet	County	12,328	41,163	540326	BAX
Zogang County	左贡县	Chamdo	Tibet	County	11,839	40,819	540327	ZOX
Markam County	芒康县	Chamdo	Tibet	County	11,576	81,659	540328	MAN
Lhorong County	洛隆县	Chamdo	Tibet	County	8,060	44,241	540329	LHO
Banbar County	边坝县	Chamdo	Tibet	County	8,775	32,462	540330	BAN
Bayi District	巴宜区	Nyingchi	Tibet	County	8,558	40,496	540402	BYA
Gongbo'gyamda County	工布江达县	Nyingchi	Tibet	County	12,960	25,677	540421	GOX
Mêdog County	墨脱县	Nyingchi	Tibet	County	6,600	10,623	540423	MET
Bomê County	波密县	Nyingchi	Tibet	County	16,072	28,288	540424	BMI
Zayu County	察隅县	Nyingchi	Tibet	County	19,000	25,784	540425	ZAY
Nang County	朗县	Nyingchi	Tibet	County	4,120	14,954	540426	NGX
Mainling City	米林市	Nyingchi	Tibet	City	9,490	18,509	540481	MAX
Nedong District	乃东区	Shannan	Tibet	District	2,184	57,334	540502	NDQ
Zhanang County	扎囊县	Shannan	Tibet	County	2,141	38,268	540521	CNG
Gonggar County	贡嘎县	Shannan	Tibet	County	2,283	47,255	540522	GON
Sangri County	桑日县	Shannan	Tibet	County	2,632	16,453	540523	SRI
Qonggyai County	琼结县	Shannan	Tibet	County	1,030	18,089	540524	QON
Qusum County	曲松县	Shannan	Tibet	County	2,069	16,943	540525	QUS
Comai County	措美县	Shannan	Tibet	County	4,177	14,320	540526	COM
Lhozhag County	洛扎县	Shannan	Tibet	County	5,022	18,511	540527	LHX
Gyaca County	加查县	Shannan	Tibet	County	4,388	18,746	540528	GYA
Lhünzê County	隆子县	Shannan	Tibet	County	8,165	34,097	540529	LHZ
Nagarzê County	浪卡子县	Shannan	Tibet	County	7,969	35,235	540531	NAX
Tsona City	错那市	Shannan	Tibet	City	6,703	14,901	540581	CON
Seni District	色尼区	Nagqu	Tibet	District	16,196	91,859	540602	-
Lhari County	嘉黎县	Nagqu	Tibet	County	13,068	27,955	540621	LHR
Biru County	比如县	Nagqu	Tibet	County	11,683	51,473	540622	BRU
Nyainrong County	聂荣县	Nagqu	Tibet	County	9,017	31,292	540623	NRO
Amdo County	安多县	Nagqu	Tibet	County	43,410	35,947	540624	AMD
Xainza County	申扎县	Nagqu	Tibet	County	25,546	18,030	540625	XZX
Sog County	索县	Nagqu	Tibet	County	5,858	39,036	540626	SOG
Baingoin County	班戈县	Nagqu	Tibet	County	28,383	35,780	540627	BGX
Baqên County	巴青县	Nagqu	Tibet	County	9,810	45,257	540628	BQE
Nyima County	尼玛县	Nagqu	Tibet	County	72,532	37,925	540629	NYX
Shuanghu County	双湖县	Nagqu	Tibet	County	116,440	10,000	540630	
Purang County	普兰县	Ngari	Tibet	County	12,539	8,658	542521	BUR
Zanda County	札达县	Ngari	Tibet	County	24,601	6,567	542522	ZAN
Gar County	噶尔县	Ngari	Tibet	County	17,669	13,367	542523	GAR
Rutog County	日土县	Ngari	Tibet	County	81,046	8,292	542524	RUT
Gê'gyai County	革吉县	Ngari	Tibet	County	46,104	13,524	542525	GEG
Gertse County	改则县	Ngari	Tibet	County	135,025	20,870	542526	GER
Coqên County	措勤县	Ngari	Tibet	County	22,893	12,183	542527	COQ
Tianshan District	天山区	Ürümqi	Xinjiang	District	171	696,277	650102	TSL
Saybag District	沙依巴克区	Ürümqi	Xinjiang	District	422	664,716	650103	SAY
Xinshi District	新市区	Ürümqi	Xinjiang	District	142	730,307	650104	XSU
Shuimogou District	水磨沟区	Ürümqi	Xinjiang	District	91	390,943	650105	SMG
Toutunhe District	头屯河区	Ürümqi	Xinjiang	District	276	172,796	650106	TTH
Dabancheng District	达坂城区	Ürümqi	Xinjiang	District	5,042	40,657	650107	DBC
Midong District	米东区	Ürümqi	Xinjiang	District	3,408	333,676	650109	MOQ
Ürümqi County	乌鲁木齐县	Ürümqi	Xinjiang	County	4,601	83,187	650121	URX
Dushanzi District	独山子区	Karamay	Xinjiang	District	400	69,361	650202	DSZ
Karamay District	克拉玛依区	Karamay	Xinjiang	District	5,351	261,445	650203	KRQ
Baijiantan District	白碱滩区	Karamay	Xinjiang	District	1,272	50,422	650204	BJT
Orku District	乌尔禾区	Karamay	Xinjiang	District	2,229	9,780	650205	ORK
Gaochang District	高昌区	Turpan	Xinjiang	District	13,650	273,385	650402	GCX
Shanshan County	鄯善县	Turpan	Xinjiang	County	39,550	231,297	650421	SSX
Toksun County	托克逊县	Turpan	Xinjiang	County	16,561	118,221	650422	TOK
Yizhou District	伊州区	Hami	Xinjiang	District	80,791	472,175	650502	YZI
Barkol Kazakh Autonomous County	巴里坤哈萨克自治县	Hami	Xinjiang	Autonomous county (Kazakh)	36,608	75,442	650522	BAR
Yiwu County	伊吾县	Hami	Xinjiang	County	19,450	24,783	650523	YWX
Changji City	昌吉市	Changji Hui Autonomous Prefecture	Xinjiang	City	7,981	426,253	652301	CJS
Fukang City	阜康市	Changji Hui Autonomous Prefecture	Xinjiang	City	11,726	165,006	652302	FKG
Hutubi County	呼图壁县	Changji Hui Autonomous Prefecture	Xinjiang	County	9,517	210,201	652323	HTB
Manas County	玛纳斯县	Changji Hui Autonomous Prefecture	Xinjiang	County	9,171	237,558	652324	MAS
Qitai County	奇台县	Changji Hui Autonomous Prefecture	Xinjiang	County	16,645	210,566	652325	
Jimsar County	吉木萨尔县	Changji Hui Autonomous Prefecture	Xinjiang	County	8,140	113,284	652327	JIM
Mori Kazakh Autonomous County	木垒哈萨克自治县	Changji Hui Autonomous Prefecture	Xinjiang	Autonomous county (Kazakh)	13,510	65,719	652328	MOR
Bole City	博乐市	Bortala	Xinjiang	City	7,801	259,557	652701	BLE
Alashankou City	阿拉山口市	Bortala	Xinjiang	City	1,204	not established	652702	ALA
Jinghe County	精河县	Bortala	Xinjiang	County	11,181	139,661	652722	JGH
Wenquan County	温泉县	Bortala	Xinjiang	County	5,885	73,700	652723	WNQ
Korla City	库尔勒市	Bayingolin	Xinjiang	City	7,219	549,324	652801	KOR
Luntai County	轮台县	Bayingolin	Xinjiang	County	14,181	116,166	652822	LTX
Yuli County	尉犁县	Bayingolin	Xinjiang	County	59,401	96,068	652823	YLI
Ruoqiang County	若羌县	Bayingolin	Xinjiang	County	199,222	35,580	652824	RQG
Qiemo County	且末县	Bayingolin	Xinjiang	County	138,680	65,572	652825	QMO
Yanqi Hui Autonomous County	焉耆回族自治县	Bayingolin	Xinjiang	Autonomous county (Hui)	2,429	127,628	652826	YQI
Hejing County	和静县	Bayingolin	Xinjiang	County	34,978	160,804	652827	HJG
Hoxud County	和硕县	Bayingolin	Xinjiang	County	12,739	72,556	652828	HOX
Bohu County	博湖县	Bayingolin	Xinjiang	County	3,593	54,788	652829	BHU
Aksu City	阿克苏市	Aksu	Xinjiang	City	14,668	535,657	652901	AKS
Kuqa City	库车市	Aksu	Xinjiang	City	15,200	462,588	652902	-
Onsu County	温宿县	Aksu	Xinjiang	County	14,335	233,933	652922	WSU
Xayar County	沙雅县	Aksu	Xinjiang	County	31,887	257,502	652924	XYR
Xinhe County	新和县	Aksu	Xinjiang	County	5,820	172,064	652925	XHT
Baicheng County	拜城县	Aksu	Xinjiang	County	15,916	229,252	652926	BCG
Uqturpan County	乌什县	Aksu	Xinjiang	County	9,051	197,990	652927	WSH
Awat County	阿瓦提县	Aksu	Xinjiang	County	13,017	237,562	652928	AWA
Kalpin County	柯坪县	Aksu	Xinjiang	County	8,912	44,261	652929	KAL
Artush City	阿图什市	Kizilsu	Xinjiang	City	15,697	225,054	653001	ART
Akto County	阿克陶县	Kizilsu	Xinjiang	County	24,176	181,049	653022	AKT
Akqi County	阿合奇县	Kizilsu	Xinjiang	County	11,545	39,764	653023	AKQ
Ulugqat County	乌恰县	Kizilsu	Xinjiang	County	19,118	54,140	653024	WQA
Kashgar City	喀什市	Kashgar	Xinjiang	City	1,056.8	506,640	653101	KHG
Shufu County	疏附县	Kashgar	Xinjiang	County	2,709	311,960	653121	SFU
Shule County	疏勒县	Kashgar	Xinjiang	County	2,394	312,455	653122	SHL
Yengisar County	英吉沙县	Kashgar	Xinjiang	County	3,425	262,067	653123	YEN
Poskam County	泽普县	Kashgar	Xinjiang	County	987.9	206,936	653124	ZEP
Yarkant County	莎车县	Kashgar	Xinjiang	County	8,969	762,385	653125	SHC
Kargilik County	叶城县	Kashgar	Xinjiang	County	28,558	454,328	653126	YEC
Makit County	麦盖提县	Kashgar	Xinjiang	County	11,022	258,978	653127	MAR
Yopurga County	岳普湖县	Kashgar	Xinjiang	County	3,128	147,688	653128	YOP
Payzawat County	伽师县	Kashgar	Xinjiang	County	6,600	381,767	653129	JSI
Maralbexi County	巴楚县	Kashgar	Xinjiang	County	18,490	336,274	653130	BCX
Tashkurgan Tajik Autonomous County	塔什库尔干塔吉克自治县	Kashgar	Xinjiang	Autonomous county (Tajik)	25,000	37,843	653131	TXK
Hotan City	和田市	Hotan	Xinjiang	City	465.84	322,300	653201	HTS
Hotan County	和田县	Hotan	Xinjiang	County	41,128	269,941	653221	HOT
Karakax County	墨玉县	Hotan	Xinjiang	County	25,788	500,114	653222	MOY
Pishan County	皮山县	Hotan	Xinjiang	County	39,741	258,210	653223	PSA
Lop County	洛浦县	Hotan	Xinjiang	County	14,287	232,916	653224	LOP
Qira County	策勒县	Hotan	Xinjiang	County	31,688	147,050	653225	QIR
Yutian County	于田县	Hotan	Xinjiang	County	39,094	249,899	653226	YUT
Niya County	民丰县	Hotan	Xinjiang	County	56,759	33,932	653227	MFG
Yining City	伊宁市	Ili	Xinjiang	City	616.7	515,082	654002	YIN
Kuytun City	奎屯市	Ili	Xinjiang	City	784.8	166,261	654003	KUY
Khorgos City	霍尔果斯市	Ili	Xinjiang	City	1,675	not established	654004	HER
Yining County	伊宁县	Ili	Xinjiang	County	4,097	372,590	654021	YNI
Qapqal Xibe Autonomous County	察布查尔锡伯自治县	Ili	Xinjiang	Autonomous county (Xibe)	4,469	179,744	654022	QAP
Huocheng County	霍城县	Ili	Xinjiang	County	3,027	352,689	654023	HCX
Gongliu County	巩留县	Ili	Xinjiang	County	4,116	164,860	654024	GLX
Xinyuan County	新源县	Ili	Xinjiang	County	7,401	282,718	654025	XYT
Zhaosu County	昭苏县	Ili	Xinjiang	County	10,426	148,187	654026	ZSX
Tekes County	特克斯县	Ili	Xinjiang	County	8,066	142,718	654027	TEK
Nilka County	尼勒克县	Ili	Xinjiang	County	10,122	157,743	654028	NIL
Tacheng City	塔城市	Tacheng	Xinjiang	City	3,991	163,606	654201	TCS
Wusu City	乌苏市	Tacheng	Xinjiang	City	14,394	215,430	654202	USU
Shawan City	沙湾市	Tacheng	Xinjiang	City	12,458	206,968	654203	SWX
Emin County	额敏县	Tacheng	Xinjiang	County	9,157	207,735	654221	EMN
Toli County	托里县	Tacheng	Xinjiang	County	19,981	93,896	654224	TLI
Yumin County	裕民县	Tacheng	Xinjiang	County	6,101	55,507	654225	YMN
Hoboksar Mongol Autonomous County	和布克赛尔蒙古自治县	Tacheng	Xinjiang	Autonomous county (Mongol)	28,784	51,634	654226	HOB
Altay City	阿勒泰市	Altay	Xinjiang	City	11,400	19,0064	654301	ALT
Burqin County	布尔津县	Altay	Xinjiang	County	10,344	66,758	654321	BUX
Fuyun County	富蕴县	Altay	Xinjiang	County	32,237	87,886	654322	FYN
Fuhai County	福海县	Altay	Xinjiang	County	33,319	81,845	654323	FHI
Habahe County	哈巴河县	Altay	Xinjiang	County	8,180	82,507	654324	HBH
Qinggil County	青河县	Altay	Xinjiang	County	15,579	58,858	654325	QHX
Jeminay Ciunty	吉木乃县	Altay	Xinjiang	County	7,145	35,365	654326	JEM
Shihezi City	石河子市	Direct administration	Xinjiang	City	460	380,130	659001	SHZ
Aral City	阿拉尔市	Direct administration	Xinjiang	City	5,258	166,205	659002	ALS
Tumxuk City	图木舒克市	Direct administration	Xinjiang	City	1,927	213,300	659003	TMK
Wujiaqu City	五家渠市	Direct administration	Xinjiang	City	742	72,613	659004	WJS
Beitun City	北屯市	Direct administration	Xinjiang	City	910.5	not established	659005	BTN
Tiemenguan City	铁门关市	Direct administration	Xinjiang	City	590	not established	659006	TMG
Shuanghe City	双河市	Direct administration	Xinjiang	City	742.18	not established	659007	SHB
Kokdala City	可克达拉市	Direct administration	Xinjiang	City	979.71	not established	659008	KKD
Kunyu City	昆玉市	Direct administration	Xinjiang	City	687.13	not established	659009	KYU
Huyanghe City	胡杨河市	Direct administration	Xinjiang	City	678	not established	659010	-
Xinxing City	新星市	Direct administration	Xinjiang	City	539	not established	659011	-
Baiyang City	白杨市	Direct administration	Xinjiang	City	4,928	not established	659012	-
Wuhua District	五华区	Kunming	Yunnan	District	397.86	855,521	530102	
Panlong District	盘龙区	Kunming	Yunnan	District	340	809,881	530103	PLQ
Guandu District	官渡区	Kunming	Yunnan	District	552	853,371	530111	GDU
Xishan District	西山区	Kunming	Yunnan	District	791	753,813	530112	XSN
Dongchuan District	东川区	Kunming	Yunnan	District	1,858	271,917	530113	DCU
Chenggong District	呈贡区	Kunming	Yunnan	District	461	310,843	530114	CGG
Jinning District	晋宁区	Kunming	Yunnan	District	1,230	283,784	530115	JNE
Fumin County	富民县	Kunming	Yunnan	County	993	145,554	530124	FMN
Yiliang County	宜良县	Kunming	Yunnan	County	1,880	419,400	530125	YIL
Shilin Yi Autonomous County	石林彝族自治县	Kunming	Yunnan	Autonomous county (Yi)	1,680	246,220	530126	
Songming County	嵩明县	Kunming	Yunnan	County	1,357	287,095	530127	
Luquan Yi and Miao Autonomous County	禄劝彝族苗族自治县	Kunming	Yunnan	Autonomous county (Yi & Miao)	4,378	396,404	530128	LUC
Xundian Hui and Yi Autonomous County	寻甸回族彝族自治县	Kunming	Yunnan	Autonomous county (Hui & Yi)	3,699	457,068	530129	XDN
Anning City	安宁市	Kunming	Yunnan	City	1,301	341,341	530181	
Qilin District	麒麟区	Qujing	Yunnan	District	1,544	740,747	530302	QLQ
Zhanyi District	沾益区	Qujing	Yunnan	District	2,815	431,058	530303	ZYB
Malong District	马龙区	Qujing	Yunnan	District	1,599	184,989	530304	-
Luliang County	陆良县	Qujing	Yunnan	County	1,989	622,397	530322	LLX
Shizong County	师宗县	Qujing	Yunnan	County	2,784	392,361	530323	SZD
Luoping County	罗平县	Qujing	Yunnan	County	3,015	549,680	530324	LPX
Fuyuan County	富源县	Qujing	Yunnan	County	3,251	722,640	530325	FYD
Huize County	会泽县	Qujing	Yunnan	County	5,093	908,292	530326	HUZ
Xuanwei City	宣威市	Qujing	Yunnan	City	6,705	1,302,891	530381	XWS
Hongta District	红塔区	Yuxi	Yunnan	District	1,004	495,129	530402	HTA
Jiangchuan District	江川区	Yuxi	Yunnan	District	850	280,889	530403	JCY
Tonghai County	通海县	Yuxi	Yunnan	County	1,247	300,800	530423	
Huaning County	华宁县	Yuxi	Yunnan	County	739	214,650	530424	HND
Yimen County	易门县	Yuxi	Yunnan	County	1,527	177,110	530425	YMD
Eshan Yi Autonomous County	峨山彝族自治县	Yuxi	Yunnan	Autonomous county (Yi)	1,932	162,831	530426	
Xinping Yi and Dai Autonomous County	新平彝族傣族自治县	Yuxi	Yunnan	Autonomous county (Yi & Dai)	4,267	285,344	530427	XNP
Yuanjiang Hani, Yi and Dai Autonomous County	元江哈尼族彝族傣族自治县	Yuxi	Yunnan	Autonomous county (Hani, Yi, & Dai)	2,858	217,392	530428	YJA
Chengjiang City	澄江市	Yuxi	Yunnan	City	804	169,366	530481	-
Longyang District	隆阳区	Baoshan	Yunnan	District	5,011	935,618	530502	LGU
Shidian County	施甸县	Baoshan	Yunnan	County	2,009	305,223	530521	
Longling County	龙陵县	Baoshan	Yunnan	County	2,884	277,319	530523	LGL
Changning County	昌宁县	Baoshan	Yunnan	County	3,888	343,566	530524	
Tengchong City	腾冲市	Baoshan	Yunnan	City	5,845	644,765	530581	TCT
Zhaoyang District	昭阳区	Zhaotong	Yunnan	District	2,240	787,845	530602	
Ludian County	鲁甸县	Zhaotong	Yunnan	County	1,487	390,654	530621	LDX
Qiaojia County	巧家县	Zhaotong	Yunnan	County	3,245	516,349	530622	QJA
Yanjin County	盐津县	Zhaotong	Yunnan	County	1,416	369,881	530623	YJD
Daguan County	大关县	Zhaotong	Yunnan	County	1,802	263,225	530624	DGN
Yongshan County	永善县	Zhaotong	Yunnan	County	2,883	394,267	530625	YSB
Suijiang County	绥江县	Zhaotong	Yunnan	County	882	153,091	530626	
Zhenxiong County	镇雄县	Zhaotong	Yunnan	County	3,785	1,328,375	530627	ZEX
Yiliang County	彝良县	Zhaotong	Yunnan	County	2,795	521,838	530628	YLG
Weixin County	威信县	Zhaotong	Yunnan	County	1,416	385,865	530629	WIX
Shuifu City	水富市	Zhaotong	Yunnan	City	319	102,143	530681	-
Gucheng District	古城区	Lijiang	Yunnan	District	1,127	211,151	530702	GUQ
Yulong Naxi Autonomous County	玉龙纳西族自治县	Lijiang	Yunnan	Autonomous county (Naxi)	6,521	214,697	530721	YLZ
Yongsheng County	永胜县	Lijiang	Yunnan	County	4,950	392,024	530722	YOS
Huaping County	华坪县	Lijiang	Yunnan	County	2,266	168,028	530723	HAP
Ninglang Yi Autonomous County	宁蒗彝族自治县	Lijiang	Yunnan	Autonomous county (Yi)	6,206	258,869	530724	NLG
Simao District	思茅区	Pu'er	Yunnan	District	3,928	296,500	530802	SYM
Ning'er Hani and Yi Autonomous County	宁洱哈尼族彝族自治县	Pu'er	Yunnan	Autonomous county (Hani & Yi)	3,670	185,700	530821	NER
Mojiang Hani Autonomous County	墨江哈尼族自治县	Pu'er	Yunnan	Autonomous county (Hani)	5,312	360,500	530822	MJG
Jingdong Yi Autonomous County	景东彝族自治县	Pu'er	Yunnan	Autonomous county (Yi)	4,532	359,500	530823	JDD
Jinggu Dai and Yi Autonomous County	景谷傣族彝族自治县	Pu'er	Yunnan	Autonomous county (Dai & Yi)	7,550	291,700	530824	JGD
Zhenyuan Yi, Hani and Lahu Autonomous County	镇沅彝族哈尼族拉祜族自治县	Pu'er	Yunnan	Autonomous county (Yi, Hani, & Lahu)	4,223	208,600	530825	ZYY
Jiangcheng Hani and Yi Autonomous County	江城哈尼族彝族自治县	Pu'er	Yunnan	Autonomous county (Hani & Yi)	3,476	121,500	530826	JCE
Menglian Dai, Lahu and Va Autonomous County	孟连傣族拉祜族佤族自治县	Pu'er	Yunnan	Autonomous county (Dai, Lahu, & Va)	1,957	135,500	530827	MLN
Lancang Lahu Autonomous County	澜沧拉祜族自治县	Pu'er	Yunnan	Autonomous county (Lahu)	8,807	491,900	530828	LCA
Ximeng Va Autonomous County	西盟佤族自治县	Pu'er	Yunnan	Autonomous county (Va)	1,391	91,300	530829	XMG
Linxiang District	临翔区	Lincang	Yunnan	District	2,652	323,708	530902	LXU
Fengqing County	凤庆县	Lincang	Yunnan	County	3,451	458,330	530921	FQX
Yun County	云县	Lincang	Yunnan	County	3,760	449,460	530922	YXP
Yongde County	永德县	Lincang	Yunnan	County	3,296	369,702	530923	YDX
Zhenkang County	永德县	Lincang	Yunnan	County	2,642	176,356	530924	ZKG
Shuangjiang Lahu, Va, Blang and Dai Autonomous County	双江拉祜族佤族布朗族傣族自治县	Lincang	Yunnan	Autonomous county (Lahu, Va, Blang, & Dai)	2,292	176,549	530925	
Gengma Dai and Va Autonomous County	耿马傣族佤族自治县	Lincang	Yunnan	Autonomous county (Dai & Va)	3,837	296,302	530926	GMA
Cangyuan Va Autonomous County	沧源佤族自治县	Lincang	Yunnan	Autonomous county (Va)	2,539	179,098	530927	CYN
Chuxiong City	楚雄市	Chuxiong	Yunnan	City	4,482	588,620	532301	CXS
Lufeng City	禄丰市	Chuxiong	Yunnan	City	3,536	422,770	532302	LFS
Shuangbai County	双柏县	Chuxiong	Yunnan	County	4,045	159,867	532322	SBA
Mouding County	牟定县	Chuxiong	Yunnan	County	1,646	208,726	532323	MDI
Nanhua County	南华县	Chuxiong	Yunnan	County	2,343	236,138	532324	NHA
Yao'an County	姚安县	Chuxiong	Yunnan	County	1,803	197,676	532325	YOA
Dayao County	大姚县	Chuxiong	Yunnan	County	4,146	273,315	532326	DYO
Yongren County	永仁县	Chuxiong	Yunnan	County	2,189	109,304	532327	YRN
Yuanmou County	元谋县	Chuxiong	Yunnan	County	2,021	215,795	532328	YMO
Wuding County	武定县	Chuxiong	Yunnan	County	3,322	271,963	532329	WDX
Gejiu City	个旧市	Honghe	Yunnan	City	1,587	459,800	532501	GJU
Kaiyuan City	开远市	Honghe	Yunnan	City	1,946	322,700	532502	KYD
Mengzi City	蒙自市	Honghe	Yunnan	City	2,172	417,200	532503	MEZ
Mile City	弥勒市	Honghe	Yunnan	City	4,004	539,700	532504	MLY
Pingbian Miao Autonomous County	屏边苗族自治县	Honghe	Yunnan	Autonomous county (Miao)	1,905	154,000	532523	PBN
Jianshui County	建水县	Honghe	Yunnan	County	3,940	531,500	532524	JSD
Shiping County	石屏县	Honghe	Yunnan	County	3,090	299,100	532525	
Luxi County	泸西县	Honghe	Yunnan	County	1,674	400,700	532527	LXD
Yuanyang County	元阳县	Honghe	Yunnan	County	2,292	396,800	532528	YYD
Honghe County	河县	Honghe	Yunnan	County	2,034	296,500	532529	HHX
Jinping Miao, Yao, and Dai Autonomous County	金平苗族瑶族傣族自治县	Honghe	Yunnan	Autonomous county (Miao, Yao, & Dai)	3,677	356,200	532530	JNP
Lüchun County	绿春县	Honghe	Yunnan	County	3,167	222,200	532531	LCX
Hekou Yao Autonomous County	河口瑶族自治县	Honghe	Yunnan	Autonomous county (Yao)	1,313	104,600	532532	HKM
Wenshan City	文山市	Wenshan	Yunnan	City	2,966	481,504	532601	WSB
Yanshan County	砚山县	Wenshan	Yunnan	County	3,888	463,264	532622	YSD
Xichou County	西畴县	Wenshan	Yunnan	County	1,545	255,286	532623	XIC
Malipo County	麻栗坡县	Wenshan	Yunnan	County	2,395	277,960	532624	MLP
Maguan County	马关县	Wenshan	Yunnan	County	2,767	367,507	532625	MGN
Qiubei County	丘北县	Wenshan	Yunnan	County	4,997	477,441	532626	QBE
Guangnan County	广南县	Wenshan	Yunnan	County	7,983	787,449	532627	GGN
Funing County	富宁县	Wenshan	Yunnan	County	5,352	407,530	532628	FND
Jinghong City	景洪市	Xishuangbanna	Yunnan	City	7,133	519,935	532801	JHG
Menghai County	勐海县	Xishuangbanna	Yunnan	County	5,511	331,850	532822	MHI
Mengla County	勐腊县	Xishuangbanna	Yunnan	County	7,056	281,730	532823	MLA
Dali City	大理市	Dali	Yunnan	City	1,738	652,000	532901	DLS
Yangbi Yi Autonomous County	漾濞彝族自治县	Dali	Yunnan	Autonomous county (Yi)	1,957	102,000	532922	YGB
Xiangyun County	祥云县	Dali	Yunnan	County	2,498	456,000	532923	XYD
Binchuan County	宾川县	Dali	Yunnan	County	2,627	349,000	532924	BCD
Midu County	弥渡县	Dali	Yunnan	County	1,571	313,000	532925	MDU
Nanjian Yi Autonomous County	南涧彝族自治县	Dali	Yunnan	Autonomous county (Yi)	1,731	212,000	532926	NNJ
Weishan Yi and Hui Autonomous County	巍山彝族回族自治县	Dali	Yunnan	Autonomous county (Yi & Hui)	2,200	304,000	532927	WSY
Yongping County	永平县	Dali	Yunnan	County	2,884	175,000	532928	YPX
Yunlong County	云龙县	Dali	Yunnan	County	4,400	200,000	532929	YLO
Eryuan County	洱源县	Dali	Yunnan	County	2,961	268,000	532930	EYN
Jianchuan County	剑川县	Dali	Yunnan	County	2,318	170,000	532931	JIC
Heqing County	鹤庆县	Dali	Yunnan	County	2,395	255,000	532932	HQG
Ruili City	瑞丽市	Dehong	Yunnan	City	1,020	180,627	533102	RUI
Mangshi City	芒市	Dehong	Yunnan	City	2,900	389,891	533103	MAB
Lianghe County	梁河县	Dehong	Yunnan	County	1,159	154,175	533122	LHD
Yingjiang County	盈江县	Dehong	Yunnan	County	4,429	305,167	533123	YGL
Longchuan County	陇川县	Dehong	Yunnan	County	1,931	181,580	533124	LCN
Lushui City	泸水市	Nujiang	Yunnan	City	2,938	184,835	533302	LMS
Fugong County	福贡县	Nujiang	Yunnan	County	2,804	98,616	533323	FGO
Gongshan Derung and Nu Autonomous County	贡山独龙族怒族自治县	Nujiang	Yunnan	Autonomous county (Derung & Nu)	4,506	37,894	533324	GSN
Lanping Bai and Pumi Autonomous County	兰坪白族普米族自治县	Nujiang	Yunnan	Autonomous county (Bai & Pumi)	4,455	212,992	533325	LPG
Shangri-La City	香格里拉市	Dêqên	Yunnan	City	11,613	172,988	533401	SEL
Deqin County	德钦县	Dêqên	Yunnan	County	7,596	66,589	533422	DQN
Weixi Lisu Autonomous County	维西傈僳族自治县	Dêqên	Yunnan	Autonomous county (Lisu)	4,661	160,605	533423	WXI
Shangcheng District	上城区	Hangzhou	Zhejiang	District	119.68	344,600	330102	SCQ
Gongshu District	拱墅区	Hangzhou	Zhejiang	District	69.25	551,900	330105	GSQ
Xihu District	西湖区	Hangzhou	Zhejiang	District	312.43	820,000	330106	XHU
Binjiang District	滨江区	Hangzhou	Zhejiang	District	72.2	319,000	330108	BJQ
Xiaoshan District	萧山区	Hangzhou	Zhejiang	District	1,417.83	1,511,300	330109	XIS
Yuhang District	余杭区	Hangzhou	Zhejiang	District	1,228.41	1,170,300	330110	YHG
Fuyang District	富阳区	Hangzhou	Zhejiang	District	1,821.03	717,700	330111	FYQ
Lin'an District	临安区	Hangzhou	Zhejiang	District	3,118.77	566,700	330112	-
Linping District	临平区	Hangzhou	Zhejiang	District	286	not established	330113	-
Qiantang District	钱塘区	Hangzhou	Zhejiang	District	531.7	not established	330114	-
Tonglu County	桐庐县	Hangzhou	Zhejiang	County	1,852	406,400	330122	TLU
Chun'an County	淳安县	Hangzhou	Zhejiang	County	4,417.48	336,800	330127	CAZ
Jiande City	建德市	Hangzhou	Zhejiang	City	2,314.19	430,800	330182	JDS
Haishu District	海曙区	Ningbo	Zhejiang	District	595.19	373,742	330203	HNB
Jiangbei District	江北区	Ningbo	Zhejiang	District	209	361,242	330205	JBQ
Beilun District	北仑区	Ningbo	Zhejiang	District	599.03	612,267	330206	BLN
Zhenhai District	镇海区	Ningbo	Zhejiang	District	237.06	418,500	330211	ZHF
Yinzhou District	鄞州区	Ningbo	Zhejiang	District	801.59	1,359,198	330212	YIZ
Fenghua District	奉化区	Ningbo	Zhejiang	District	1,249	491,697	330213	FHA
Xiangshan County	象山县	Ningbo	Zhejiang	County	1,393.82	503,279	330225	XSZ
Ninghai County	宁海县	Ningbo	Zhejiang	County	1,861.20	646,074	330226	NHI
Yuyao City	余姚市	Ningbo	Zhejiang	City	1,500.8	1,010,659	330281	YYO
Cixi City	慈溪市	Ningbo	Zhejiang	City	1,360.63	1,462,383	330282	CXI
Lucheng District	鹿城区	Wenzhou	Zhejiang	District	290.47	1,293,300	330302	LUW
Longwan District	龙湾区	Wenzhou	Zhejiang	District	319.46	749,300	330303	LWW
Ouhai District	瓯海区	Wenzhou	Zhejiang	District	466.28	996,900	330304	OHQ
Dongtou District	洞头区	Wenzhou	Zhejiang	District	100.3	87,700	330305	DTZ
Yongjia County	永嘉县	Wenzhou	Zhejiang	County	2,698	789,200	330324	YJX
Pingyang County	平阳县	Wenzhou	Zhejiang	County	1,042.21	761,700	330326	PYG
Cangnan County	苍南县	Wenzhou	Zhejiang	County	1,261.08	1,184,600	330327	CNA
Wencheng County	文成县	Wenzhou	Zhejiang	County	1,293.24	212,100	330328	WCZ
Taishun County	泰顺县	Wenzhou	Zhejiang	County	1,768.02	233,400	330329	TSZ
Rui'an City	瑞安市	Wenzhou	Zhejiang	City	1,271	1,424,700	330381	RAS
Yueqing City	乐清市	Wenzhou	Zhejiang	City	1,669.3	1,389,300	330382	YQZ
Longgang City	龙港市	Wenzhou	Zhejiang	City	183.99	382,000	330383	-
Nanhu District	南湖区	Jiaxing	Zhejiang	District	438.99	612,771	330402	NHQ
Xiuzhou District	秀洲区	Jiaxing	Zhejiang	District	542	589,253	330411	XZH
Jiashan County	嘉善县	Jiaxing	Zhejiang	County	506.88	574,233	330421	JSK
Haiyan County	海盐县	Jiaxing	Zhejiang	County	584.96	430,928	330424	HYN
Haining City	海宁市	Jiaxing	Zhejiang	City	700.5	807,094	330481	HNG
Pinghu City	平湖市	Jiaxing	Zhejiang	City	536	671,851	330482	PHU
Tongxiang City	桐乡市	Jiaxing	Zhejiang	City	727.49	815,803	330483	TXZ
Wuxing District	吴兴区	Huzhou	Zhejiang	District	862.72	757,165	330502	WXU
Nanxun District	南浔区	Huzhou	Zhejiang	District	702.24	536,054	330503	NXQ
Deqing County	德清县	Huzhou	Zhejiang	County	937.7	491,789	330521	DQX
Changxing County	长兴县	Huzhou	Zhejiang	County	1,431.34	641,982	330522	CXG
Anji County	安吉县	Huzhou	Zhejiang	County	1,886	466,552	330523	AJI
Yuecheng District	越城区	Shaoxing	Zhejiang	District	493.25	883,800	330602	YSX
Keqiao District	柯桥区	Shaoxing	Zhejiang	District	1,040	1,325,800	330603	KQO
Shangyu District	上虞区	Shaoxing	Zhejiang	District	1,405.79	779,400	330604	SYG
Xinchang County	新昌县	Shaoxing	Zhejiang	County	1,213.55	380,400	330624	XCX
Zhuji City	诸暨市	Shaoxing	Zhejiang	City	2,311.41	1,157,900	330681	ZHJ
Shengzhou City	嵊州市	Shaoxing	Zhejiang	City	1,789.07	679,800	330683	SGZ
Wucheng District	婺城区	Jinhua	Zhejiang	District	1,391.24	761,700	330702	WCF
Jindong District	金东区	Jinhua	Zhejiang	District	658.16	315,600	330703	JDQ
Wuyi County	武义县	Jinhua	Zhejiang	County	1,568.18	349,900	330703	WYX
Pujiang County	浦江县	Jinhua	Zhejiang	County	918.16	437,300	330726	PJG
Pan'an County	磐安县	Jinhua	Zhejiang	County	1,194.74	174,700	330727	PAX
Lanxi City	兰溪市	Jinhua	Zhejiang	City	1,312.44	560,500	330781	LXZ
Yiwu City	义乌市	Jinhua	Zhejiang	City	1,105.48	1,234,000	330782	YWS
Dongyang City	东阳市	Jinhua	Zhejiang	City	1,744.05	804,400	330783	DGY
Yongkang City	永康市	Jinhua	Zhejiang	City	1,046.02	723,500	330784	YKG
Kecheng District	柯城区	Quzhou	Zhejiang	District	606.57	464,500	330802	KEC
Qujiang District	衢江区	Quzhou	Zhejiang	District	1,747.53	341,400	330803	QJI
Changshan County	常山县	Quzhou	Zhejiang	County	1,097.32	241,400	330822	CSN
Kaihua County	开化县	Quzhou	Zhejiang	County	2,224	245,100	330824	KHU
Longyou County	龙游县	Quzhou	Zhejiang	County	1,143	362,400	330825	LGY
Jiangshan City	江山市	Quzhou	Zhejiang	City	2,019.03	467,900	330881	JIS
Dinghai District	定海区	Zhoushan	Zhejiang	District	568.8	464,200	330902	DHQ
Putuo District	普陀区	Zhoushan	Zhejiang	District	458.6	378,800	330903	PTO
Daishan County	岱山县	Zhoushan	Zhejiang	County	326.5	202,200	330921	DSH
Shengsi County	嵊泗县	Zhoushan	Zhejiang	County	86	76,100	330922	SSZ
Jiaojiang District	椒江区	Taizhou	Zhejiang	District	363.79	653,800	331002	JJT
Huangyan District	黄岩区	Taizhou	Zhejiang	District	988	632,100	331003	HYT
Luqiao District	路桥区	Taizhou	Zhejiang	District	274	616,600	331004	LQT
Sanmen County	三门县	Taizhou	Zhejiang	County	1,103.82	328,900	331022	SMN
Tiantai County	天台县	Taizhou	Zhejiang	County	1,431.66	382,800	331023	TTA
Xianju County	仙居县	Taizhou	Zhejiang	County	2,000.11	342,700	331024	XJU
Wenling City	温岭市	Taizhou	Zhejiang	City	926	1,366,800	331081	WLS
Linhai City	临海市	Taizhou	Zhejiang	City	2,171	1,028,800	331082	LHI
Yuhuan City	玉环市	Taizhou	Zhejiang	City	378	616,300	331083	YHZ
Liandu District	莲都区	Lishui	Zhejiang	District	1,493.44	451,400	331102	LID
Qingtian County	青田县	Lishui	Zhejiang	County	2,493	336,500	331121	QTN
Jinyun County	缙云县	Lishui	Zhejiang	County	1,494.24	358,900	331122	JYP
Suichang County	遂昌县	Lishui	Zhejiang	County	2,539.56	190,200	331123	SCZ
Songyang County	松阳县	Lishui	Zhejiang	County	1,400.77	185,100	331124	SGY
Yunhe County	云和县	Lishui	Zhejiang	County	984	111,600	331125	YNH
Qingyuan County	庆元县	Lishui	Zhejiang	County	1,898	141,500	331126	QYX
Jingning She Autonomous County	景宁畲族自治县	Lishui	Zhejiang	Autonomous county (She)	1,938.84	107,100	331127	JGN
Longquan City	龙泉市	Lishui	Zhejiang	City	3,059	234,600	331181	LGQ

=== Dissolved Counties ===
Name	Name in Chinese	now part of	Prefecture	Province	Type	Population Census 2010	Year dissolved
Sanshan District	三山区	Yijiang District	Wuhu	Anhui	District	144,378	2020
Jinjiazhuang District	金家庄区	Huashan District	Ma'anshan	Anhui	District	128,004	2012
Chongwen District	崇文区	Xicheng District	Directly administered	Beijing	District	merge into Xicheng	2010
Xuanwu District	宣武区	Dongcheng District	Directly administered	Beijing	District	merge into Dongcheng	2010
Shizhong District	市中区	Shapingba District and Yuzhong District	Directly administered	Chongqing	District	split between Shapingba and Yuzhong	1995
Shuangqiao District	双桥区	Dazu District	Directly administered	Chongqing	District	50,100	2011
Wansheng District	万盛区	Qijiang District	Directly administered	Chongqing	District	255,800	2011
Meilie District	梅列区	Sanyuan District	Sanming	Fujian	District	176,539	2021
Maogang District	茂港区	Dianbai District	Maoming	Guangdong	District	396,781	2014
Luogang District	萝岗区	Huangpu District	Guangzhou	Guangdong	District	373,670	2014
Dieshan District	蝶山区	Wanxiu District	Wuzhou	Guangxi	District	194,900	2013
Xiaohe District	小河区	Huaxi District	Guiyang	Guizhou	District	248,159	2012
Hainan Province Paracel, Spratly and Zhongsha Islands Authority	海南省西沙群岛、南沙群岛、中沙群岛办事处	Xisha District and Nansha District (county level), Sansha (entity becomes a prefecture level division)	Directly administered	Hainan	Administrative office	444	2012
Handan County	邯郸县		Handan	Hebei	County	462,012	2016
Beishi District	北市区	Lianchi, Baoding	Baoding	Hebei	District	387,339	2015
Nanshi District	南市区	Lianchi, Baoding	Baoding	Hebei	District	287,784	2015
Xuanhua County	宣化县	Xuanhua District	Zhangjiakou	Hebei	District	273,506	2015
Baixia District	白下区	Qinhuai District	Nanjing	Jiangsu	District	602,031	2013
Xiaguan District	下关区	Gulou District	Nanjing	Jiangsu	District	445,117	2013
Canglang District	沧浪区	Gusu District	Suzhou	Jiangsu	District	394,958	2012
Jinchang District	金阊区	Gusu District	Suzhou	Jiangsu	District	290,811	2012
Pingjiang District	平江区	Gusu District	Suzhou	Jiangsu	District	268,686	2012
Weiyang District	维扬区	Hanjiang District	Yangzhou	Jiangsu	District	474,449	2011
Changdao County	长岛县	Penglai District	Yantai	Shandong	County	44,000	2020
Shizhong District	市中区	Rencheng District	Jining	Shandong	District	588,900	2013
Jiaonan City	胶南市	Huangdao District	Qingdao	Shandong	City	868,400	2012
Sifang District	四方区	Shibei District	Qingdao	Shandong	District	462,500	2012
Luwan District	卢湾区	Huangpu District	Directly administered	Shanghai	District	248,779	2011
Zhabei District	闸北区	Jing'an District	Directly administered	Shanghai	District	830,476	2015
Xiacheng District	下城区	Gongshu District	Hangzhou	Zhejiang	District	526,100	2021
Jianggan District	江干区	Shangcheng District (part) Qiantang District (part)	Hangzhou	Zhejiang	District	998,800	2021
Jiangdong District	江东区	Yinzhou District	Ningbo	Zhejiang	District	366,648	2016

=== Name Changes ===
Old→New Name	Old→New Name in Chinese	Prefecture	Province	Type
Mei(xian) → Meixian	梅区→梅县区	Meizhou	Guangdong	District
Jinyang → Guanshanhu	金阳新区→观山湖区	Guiyang	Guizhou	District
Tongren → Bijiang	铜仁市→碧江区	Tongren	Guizhou	District
Bijie → Qixingguan	毕节市→七星关区	Bijie	Guizhou	District
Tanghai → Caofeidian	唐海县→曹妃甸区	Tangshan	Hebei	District
Xiangyang → Xiangzhou	襄阳区→襄州区	Xiangyang	Hubei	District
Chuzhou → Huai'an	楚州区→淮安区	Huai'an	Jiangsu	District
Badaojiang → Hunjiang	八道江区→浑江区	Baishan	Jilin	District
Dongling → Hunnan	东陵区→浑南区	Shenyang	Liaoning	District
Ling(xian) → Lingcheng	陵县→陵城区	Dezhou	Shandong	District
Yuanba → Zhaohua	元坝区→昭化区	Guangyuan	Sichuan	District
Qamdo → Karuo	昌都县→卡若区	Chamdo	Tibet	District
Xigazê → Samzhubzê	日喀则市→桑珠孜区	Shigatse	Tibet	District
Luxi → Mangshi	潞西市→芒市	Dehong	Yunnan	City
Shaoxing → Keqiao	绍兴县→柯桥区	Shaoxing	Zhejiang	District

== See also ==
- List of cities in China
- List of prefectures in China
- Counties of China
