= Zhongshu =

Zhongshu may refer to:

- Zhongshu, Luxi County (中枢), a town in Luxi County, Yunnan
- Zhongshu Subdistrict, Luliang County, a subdistrict in Luliang County, Yunnan
- Zhongshu Subdistrict, Renhuai, a subdistrict in Renhuai, Guizhou
- Zhongshu Sheng, variously a government ministry or province in China from the Sui to Yuan dynasties
- 中樹, the pen name of Republic of Korea president, Park Chung-hee
