= 越州 =

越州 may refer to:

- Koshi Province (Japan), all abbreviated name was following Esshū (越州)
  - Echigo Province, province of Japan located in what is today Niigata Prefecture
  - Echizen Province, province of Japan located in what is today Fukui Prefecture
  - Etchū Province, province of Japan located in what is today Toyama Prefecture
- Yue Prefecture (Zhejiang) (越州), a prefecture between the 7th and 12th centuries in modern Zhejiang, China
- Yuezhou Town
