= Luliang =

Luliang may refer to:

- Lüliang Mountains (吕梁山), in Shanxi, China
- Lüliang (吕梁市), city in Shanxi, China
- Luliang County (陆良县), in Yunnan, China

== See also ==
- Later Liang (Sixteen Kingdoms) (386–403) or Lü Liang
