= Qilin, Qujing =

Qilin 麒麟区
- District
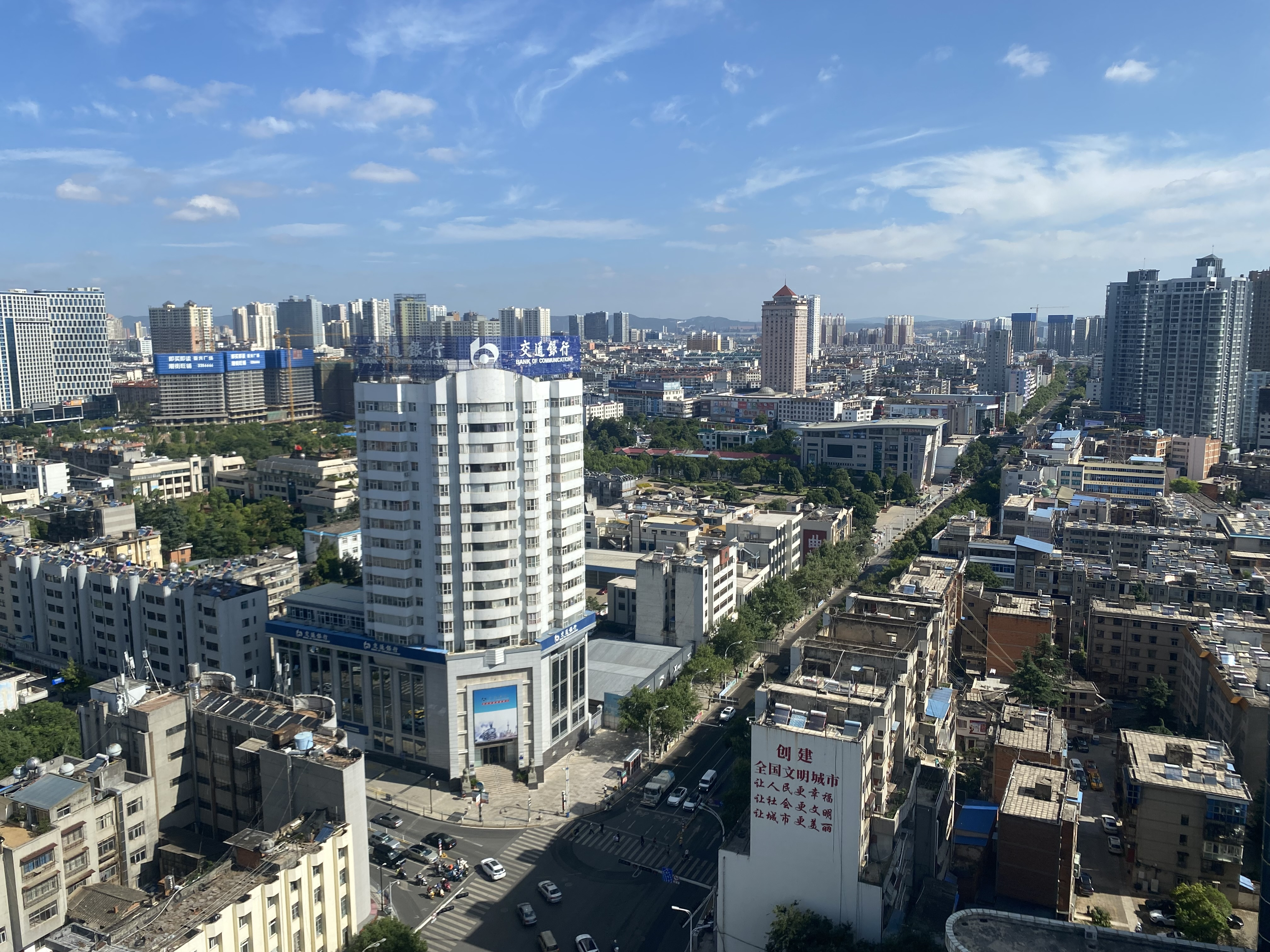

- Location of Qilin District (red) and Qujing City (pink) within Yunnan

- Location within China Qilin (China)
- Coordinates: 25°29′38″N 103°48′40″E
- Country: China
- Province: Yunnan
- Prefecture-level city: Qujing
- District seat: Nanning Subdistrict

Area
  - Total: 4,093 km^{2} (1,580 sq mi)

Population (2020 census)
  - Total: 996,279
  - Density: 243.4/km^{2} (630.4/sq mi)
- Postal code: 655000
- Area code: 0874
- Website: www.ql.gov.cn

Qilin District (Chinese: 麒麟区; pinyin: Qílín Qū) is a district of the city of Qujing, Yunnan province, China. It borders Fuyuan County, Yunnan and Luoping County to the east, Luliang County to the south, Malong District to the west and Zhanyi District to the north.

== Administrative divisions ==
Qilin District has 13 subdistricts and 3 towns.

13 subdistricts

- Nanning (南宁街道)
- Jianning (建宁街道)
- Baishijiang (白石江街道)
- Liaokuo (寥廓街道)
- Xicheng (西城街道)
- Yining (益宁街道)
- Wenhua (文华街道)
- Taihe (太和街道)
- Xiaoxiang (潇湘街道)
- Cuifeng (翠峰街道)
- Sanbao (三宝街道)
- Yanjiang (沿江街道)
- Zhujie (珠街街道)

3 towns

- Yuezhou (越州镇)
- Dongshan (东山镇)
- Ciying (茨营镇)
