= Huize County =

Huize County 会泽县
- County
- Location of Huize County (red) within Qujing City (pink) and Yunnan

- Location of the seat in Yunnan
- Coordinates: 26°24′57″N 103°17′37″E
- Country: People's Republic of China
- Province: Yunnan
- Prefecture-level city: Qujing

Area
  - Total: 5,093 km^{2} (1,966 sq mi)

Population
  - Total: 872,361
  - Density: 171.3/km^{2} (443.6/sq mi)
- Time zone: UTC+8 (China Standard)
- Postal code: 654200
- Area code: 0874
- Website: hz.yn.gov.cn

Huize County (simplified Chinese: 会泽县; traditional Chinese: 會澤縣; pinyin: Huìzé Xiàn, old name: Dongchuan 東川) is a county, under the jurisdiction of Qujing City, Yunnan province, People's Republic of China.

== Demography ==
The city has grown considerably over the past 20 years. It has 871,200 inhabitants.

== Geography ==
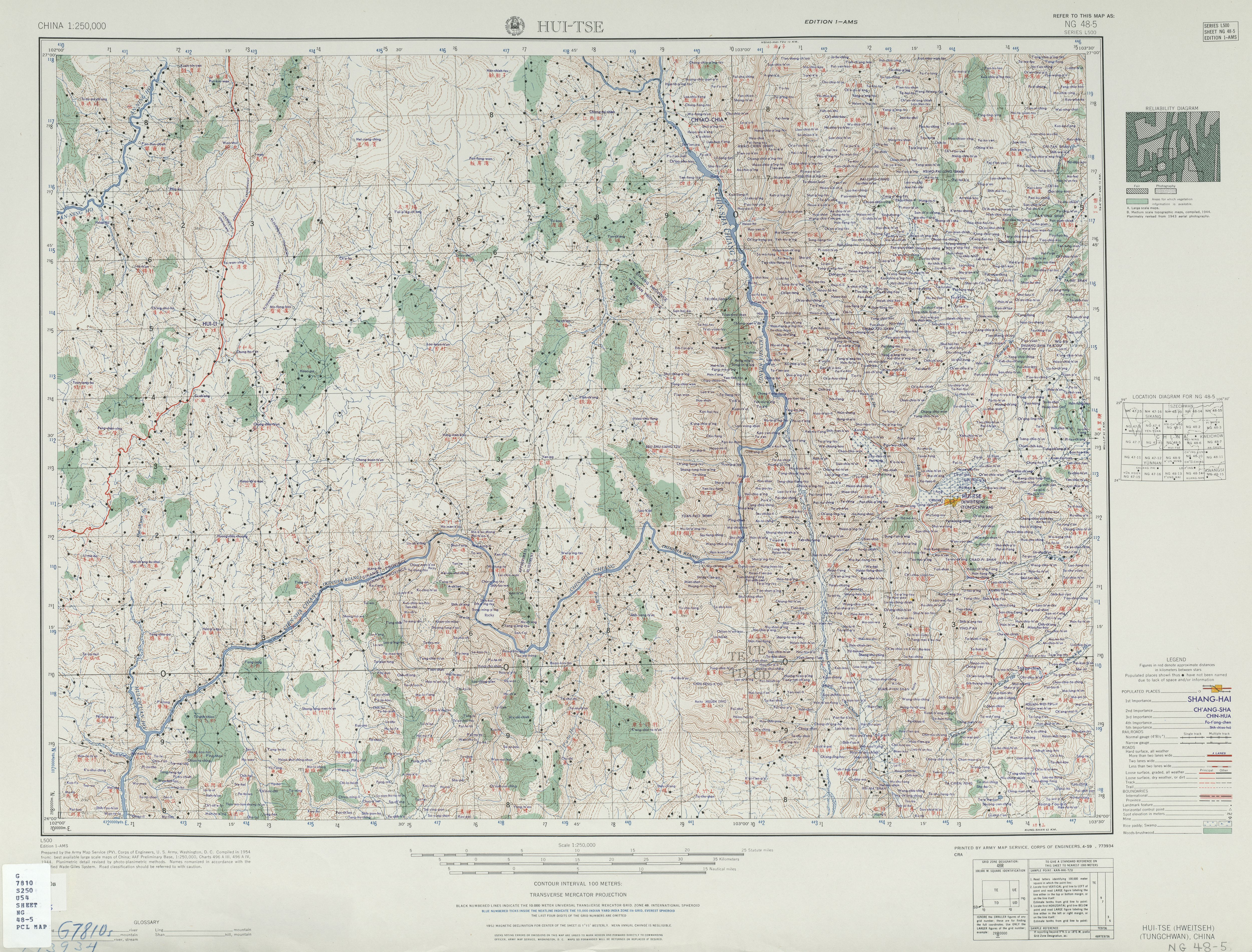
Map including Huize (labeled as HUI-TSE (HWEITSEH) (TUNGCHWAN) 會澤) (AMS, 1954)

Huize is in northeastern Yunnan and borders Xuanwei and Weining County, Guizhou to the east, Zhanyi District and Xundian County to the south, Dongchuan District and Qiaojia County to the west and Ludian County to the north.

It is 120 km (75 mi) from the center of Qujing.

Huize is located between mountains with rice fields at one side and a large earth dam to the south. Some of the mountain areas are blasted for construction materials.

== Administrative divisions ==
Huize County has 3 subdistricts, 7 towns, 12 townships and 1 ethnic township.

3 subdistricts

- Gucheng (古城街道)
- Baoyun (宝云街道)
- Jinzhong (金钟街道)

7 towns

- Nagu (娜姑镇)
- Yiche (迤车镇)
- Leye (乐业镇)
- Kuangshan (矿山镇)
- Zhehai (者海镇)
- Dajing (大井镇)
- Daibu (待补镇)

12 townships

- Dahai (大海乡)
- Laochang (老厂乡)
- Wuxing (五星乡)
- Daqiao (大桥乡)
- Zhichang (纸厂乡)
- Malu (马路乡)
- Huohong (火红乡)
- Yulu (雨碌乡)
- Luna (鲁纳乡)
- Shangcun (上村乡)
- Jiache (驾车乡)
- Tianba (田坝乡)

1 ethnic township

- Xinjie Hui (新街回族乡)

== Climate ==
Tempered by the low latitude and moderate elevation, Huize has a mild subtropical highland climate (Köppen Cwb), with short, mild, dry winters, and warm, rainy summers. A great majority of the year's rainfall occurs from June to September.

Climate data for Huize, elevation 2,188 m (7,178 ft), (1991–2020 normals, extremes 1971–present)
Month	Jan	Feb	Mar	Apr	May	Jun	Jul	Aug	Sep	Oct	Nov	Dec	Year
Record high °C (°F)	21.7 (71.1)	24.2 (75.6)	27.6 (81.7)	29.0 (84.2)	32.1 (89.8)	31.2 (88.2)	30.4 (86.7)	29.4 (84.9)	30.1 (86.2)	25.7 (78.3)	24.3 (75.7)	21.0 (69.8)	32.1 (89.8)
Mean daily maximum °C (°F)	12.5 (54.5)	14.9 (58.8)	19.4 (66.9)	22.2 (72.0)	23.6 (74.5)	24.0 (75.2)	23.9 (75.0)	23.8 (74.8)	21.6 (70.9)	18.2 (64.8)	15.8 (60.4)	12.4 (54.3)	19.4 (66.8)
Daily mean °C (°F)	5.8 (42.4)	8.1 (46.6)	12.0 (53.6)	15.1 (59.2)	17.2 (63.0)	18.6 (65.5)	19.1 (66.4)	18.5 (65.3)	16.4 (61.5)	12.9 (55.2)	9.4 (48.9)	6.0 (42.8)	13.3 (55.9)
Mean daily minimum °C (°F)	1.1 (34.0)	3.1 (37.6)	6.4 (43.5)	9.6 (49.3)	12.4 (54.3)	15.0 (59.0)	15.8 (60.4)	15.1 (59.2)	13.0 (55.4)	9.7 (49.5)	5.2 (41.4)	1.8 (35.2)	9.0 (48.2)
Record low °C (°F)	−17.0 (1.4)	−16.2 (2.8)	−8.0 (17.6)	−3.6 (25.5)	1.2 (34.2)	7.6 (45.7)	7.7 (45.9)	6.7 (44.1)	3.3 (37.9)	−1.0 (30.2)	−6.0 (21.2)	−14.8 (5.4)	−17.0 (1.4)
Average precipitation mm (inches)	14.8 (0.58)	10.7 (0.42)	21.6 (0.85)	27.6 (1.09)	67.4 (2.65)	162 (6.4)	173.4 (6.83)	149.8 (5.90)	87.9 (3.46)	52.6 (2.07)	18.7 (0.74)	6.8 (0.27)	793.3 (31.26)
Average precipitation days (≥ 0.1 mm)	4.8	5.0	6.5	8.4	11.6	15.6	18.7	16.9	13.8	11.8	4.9	3.4	121.4
Average snowy days	3.8	3.2	1.3	0.3	0	0	0	0	0	0	0.6	2.8	12
Average relative humidity (%)	63	57	53	56	64	75	79	79	80	81	73	70	69
Mean monthly sunshine hours	207.7	205.7	252.9	254.7	224.0	166.8	158.4	161.9	144.4	147.9	191.4	196.4	2,312.2
Percentage possible sunshine	63	65	68	66	54	41	38	40	40	42	59	61	53
Source 1: China Meteorological Administration all-time extreme temperatureall-time November record
Source 2: Weather China

== Transport ==
- China National Highway 213

== Economy ==
There are several food markets, temples, shops and bars in the county center.

== Tourist attractions ==
On 23 July 2023 a glass segment of touristic glass slide had completely dislodged, leaving a void at a height of 10 metres. It caused collisions between rafts but nobody was injured. A video of the accident was in the worldwide media.
