= Zhanyi, Qujing =

Zhanyi 沾益区
- District
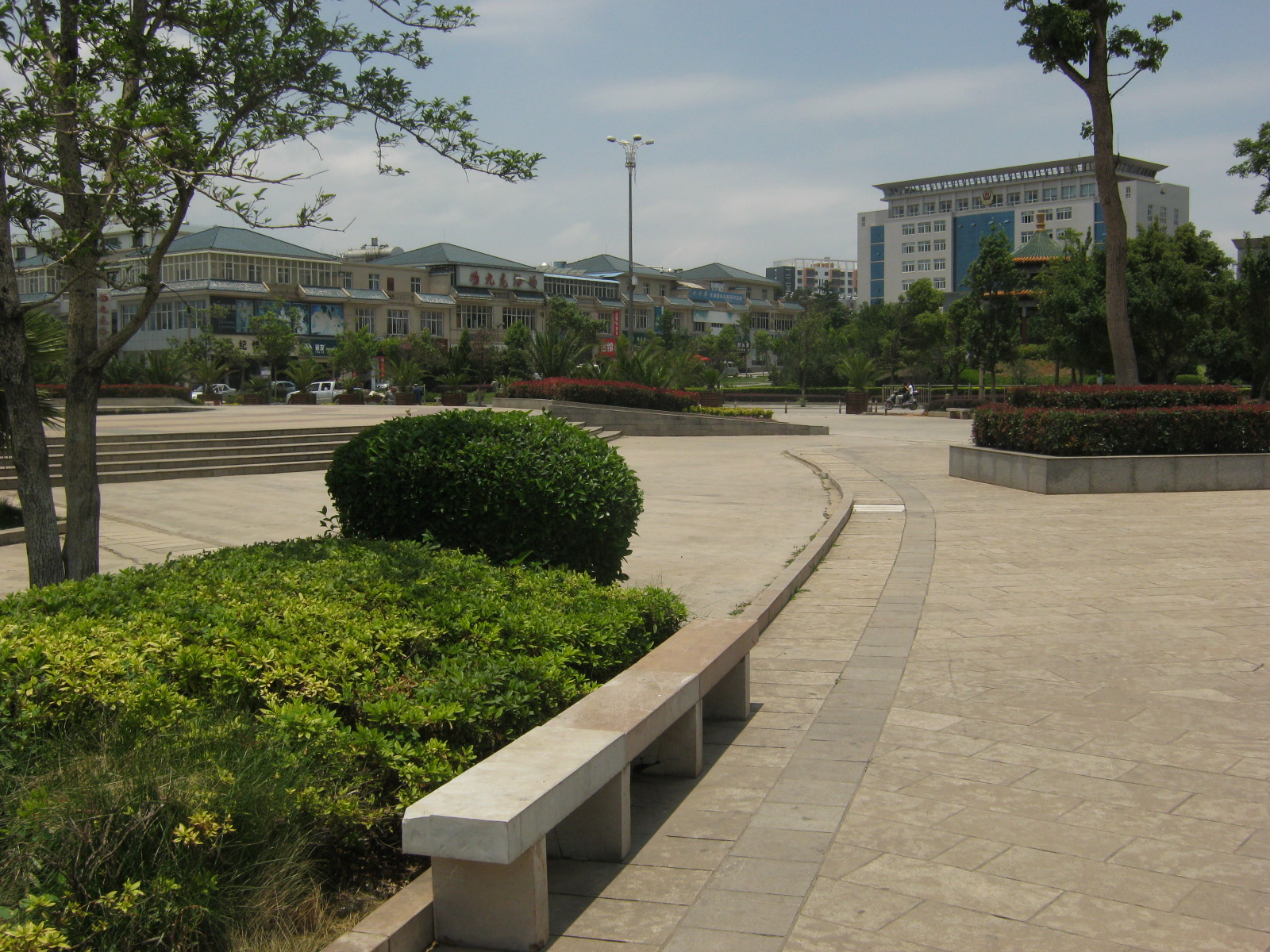
- Zhanyi in 2013

- Location of Zhanyi County (red) and Qujing City (pink) within Yunnan
- Coordinates: 25°36′02″N 103°49′20″E
- Country: People's Republic of China
- Province: Yunnan
- Prefecture-level city: Qujing

Area
  - Total: 2,096 km^{2} (809 sq mi)

Population
  - Total: 374,709
  - Density: 178.8/km^{2} (463.0/sq mi)
- Time zone: UTC+8 (CST)
- Postal code: 655300
- Area code: 0874
- Website: Official Website

Zhanyi District (simplified Chinese: 沾益区; traditional Chinese: 霑益區; pinyin: Zhānyì Qū) is a district of the city of Qujing, Yunnan province, China. Zhanyi Airport is located nearby.

== Geography ==
Zhanyi is in the center of Qujing in eastern Yunnan. It borders Fuyuan County, Yunnan to the east, Qilin District and Malong District to the south, Xundian County and Huize County to the west and Xuanwei to the north.

== Administrative divisions ==
Zhanyi District has 4 subdistricts, 2 towns and 5 townships.

4 subdistricts

- Xiping (西平街道)
- Longhua (龙华街道)
- Jinlong (金龙街道)
- Huashan (花山街道)

2 towns

- Baishui (白水镇)
- Panjiang (盘江镇)

5 townships

- Yanfang (炎方乡)
- Bole (播乐乡)
- Dapo (大坡乡)
- Lingjiao (菱角乡)
- Deze (德泽乡)

== Climate ==
Climate data for Zhanyi District, elevation 1,892 m (6,207 ft), (1991–2020 normals, extremes 1991–present)
Month	Jan	Feb	Mar	Apr	May	Jun	Jul	Aug	Sep	Oct	Nov	Dec	Year
Record high °C (°F)	25.9 (78.6)	28.8 (83.8)	29.5 (85.1)	31.9 (89.4)	33.4 (92.1)	31.8 (89.2)	31.1 (88.0)	31.5 (88.7)	30.1 (86.2)	27.6 (81.7)	26.2 (79.2)	24.6 (76.3)	33.4 (92.1)
Mean daily maximum °C (°F)	15.2 (59.4)	17.5 (63.5)	21.5 (70.7)	24.3 (75.7)	25.3 (77.5)	25.1 (77.2)	24.9 (76.8)	25.0 (77.0)	23.2 (73.8)	20.3 (68.5)	18.0 (64.4)	14.9 (58.8)	21.3 (70.3)
Daily mean °C (°F)	8.0 (46.4)	10.0 (50.0)	13.7 (56.7)	17.0 (62.6)	19.0 (66.2)	20.0 (68.0)	20.1 (68.2)	19.7 (67.5)	17.9 (64.2)	15.1 (59.2)	11.6 (52.9)	8.2 (46.8)	15.0 (59.1)
Mean daily minimum °C (°F)	3.2 (37.8)	4.5 (40.1)	7.8 (46.0)	11.2 (52.2)	14.3 (57.7)	16.6 (61.9)	17.0 (62.6)	16.3 (61.3)	14.6 (58.3)	11.9 (53.4)	7.2 (45.0)	3.8 (38.8)	10.7 (51.3)
Record low °C (°F)	−6.7 (19.9)	−6.1 (21.0)	−2.4 (27.7)	1.2 (34.2)	4.5 (40.1)	9.4 (48.9)	11.9 (53.4)	9.8 (49.6)	5.3 (41.5)	3.2 (37.8)	−3.5 (25.7)	−6.2 (20.8)	−6.7 (19.9)
Average precipitation mm (inches)	22.9 (0.90)	17.1 (0.67)	22.5 (0.89)	32.5 (1.28)	93.3 (3.67)	192.9 (7.59)	170.1 (6.70)	134.1 (5.28)	97.8 (3.85)	87.2 (3.43)	27.8 (1.09)	16.7 (0.66)	914.9 (36.01)
Average precipitation days (≥ 0.1 mm)	6.6	6.2	6.6	8.2	12.1	16.7	17.9	16.4	12.9	13.3	6.5	5.4	128.8
Average snowy days	3.1	2.2	0.6	0	0	0	0	0	0	0	0.2	1.6	7.7
Average relative humidity (%)	67	60	55	56	64	75	79	79	78	79	73	71	70
Mean monthly sunshine hours	190.0	193.7	233.3	230.9	202.0	135.3	131.8	150.3	123.7	120.6	168.9	169.2	2,049.7
Percentage possible sunshine	57	60	62	60	49	33	32	38	34	34	52	52	47
Source: China Meteorological Administrationall-time November record high

== Transport ==
Zhanyi is served by the Shanghai-Kunming and Pan County West Railways.
