= Malong, Qujing =

Coordinates: 25°24′00″N 103°32′36″E

Malong 马龙区
- District
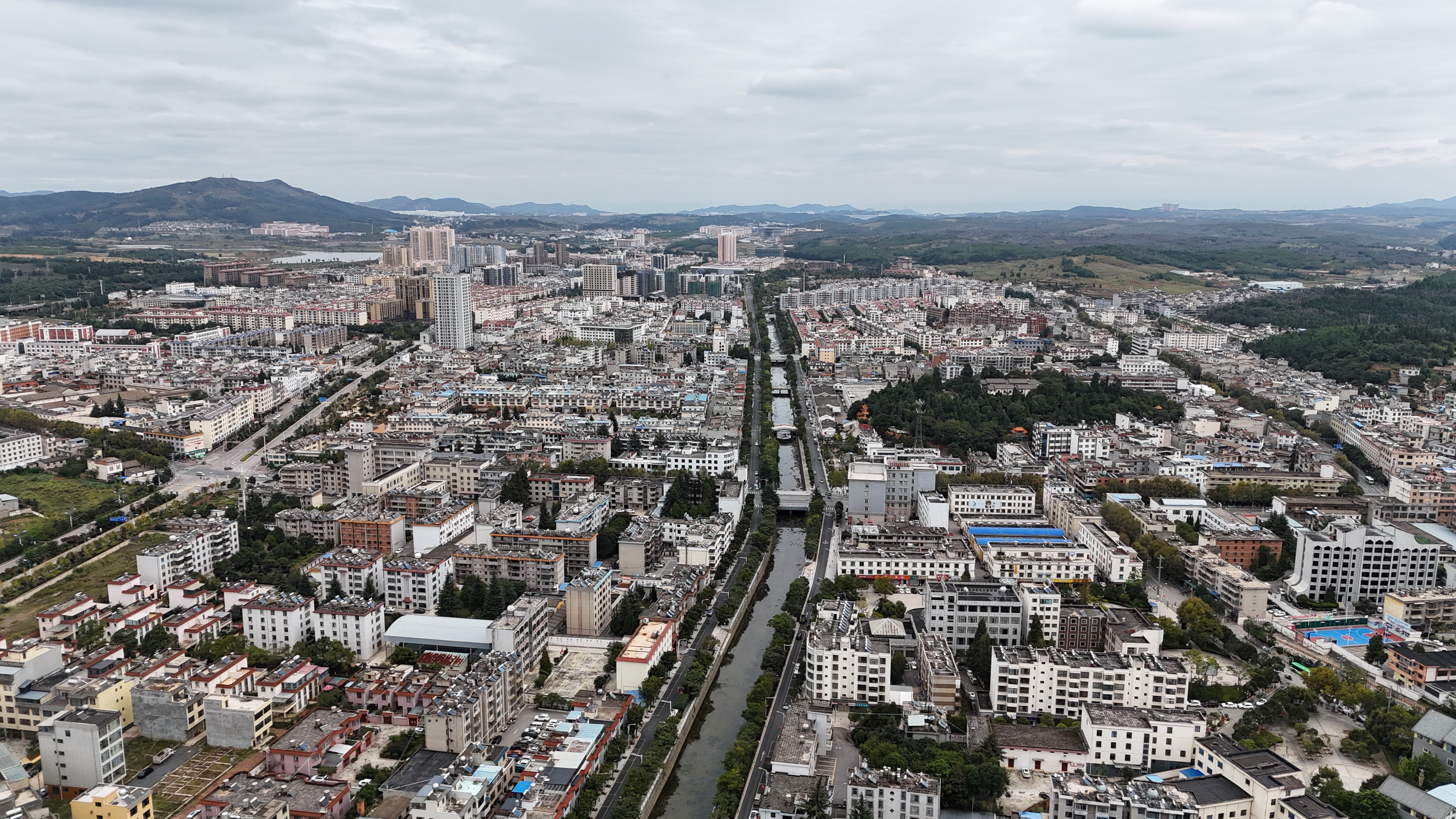
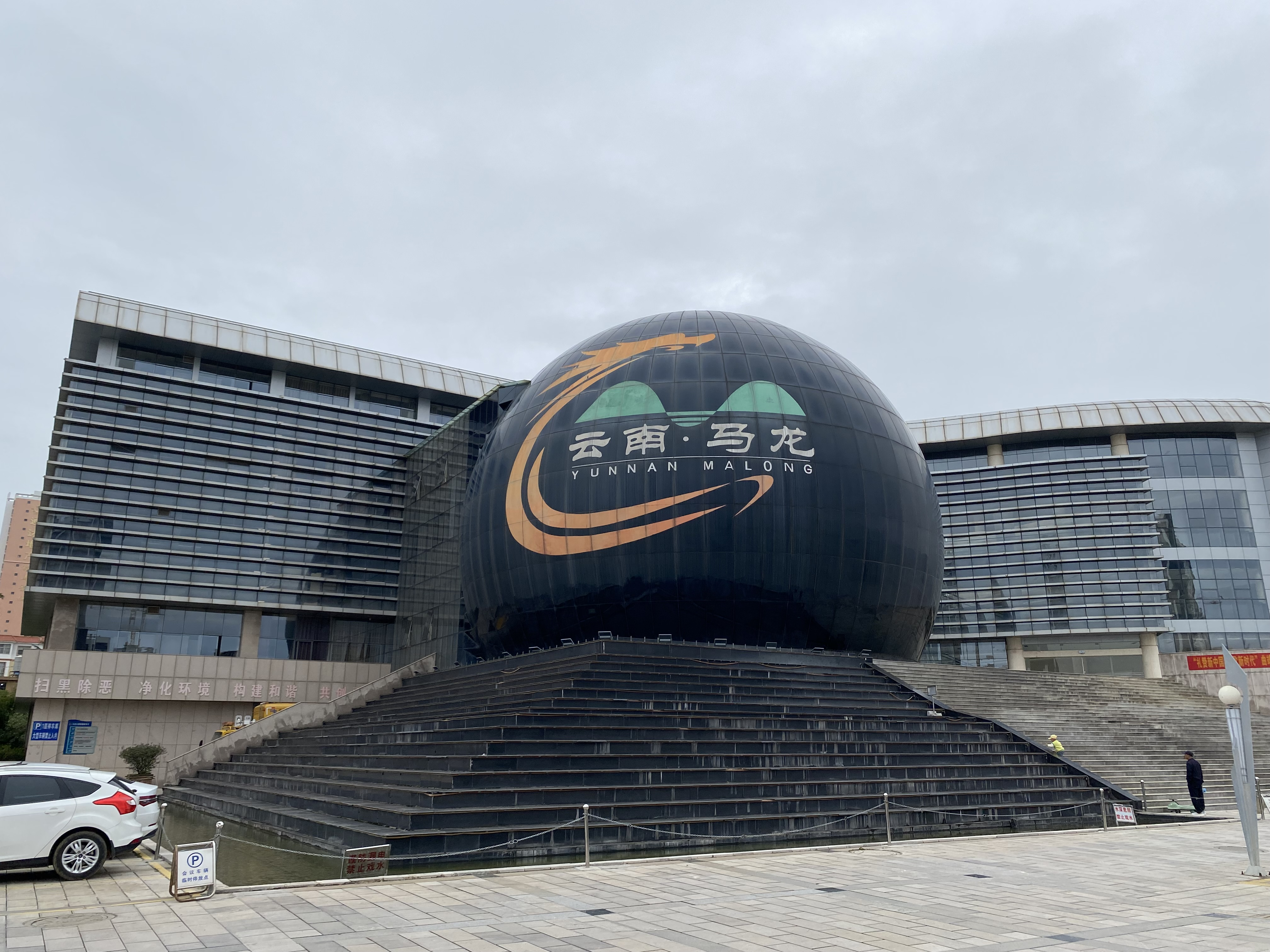
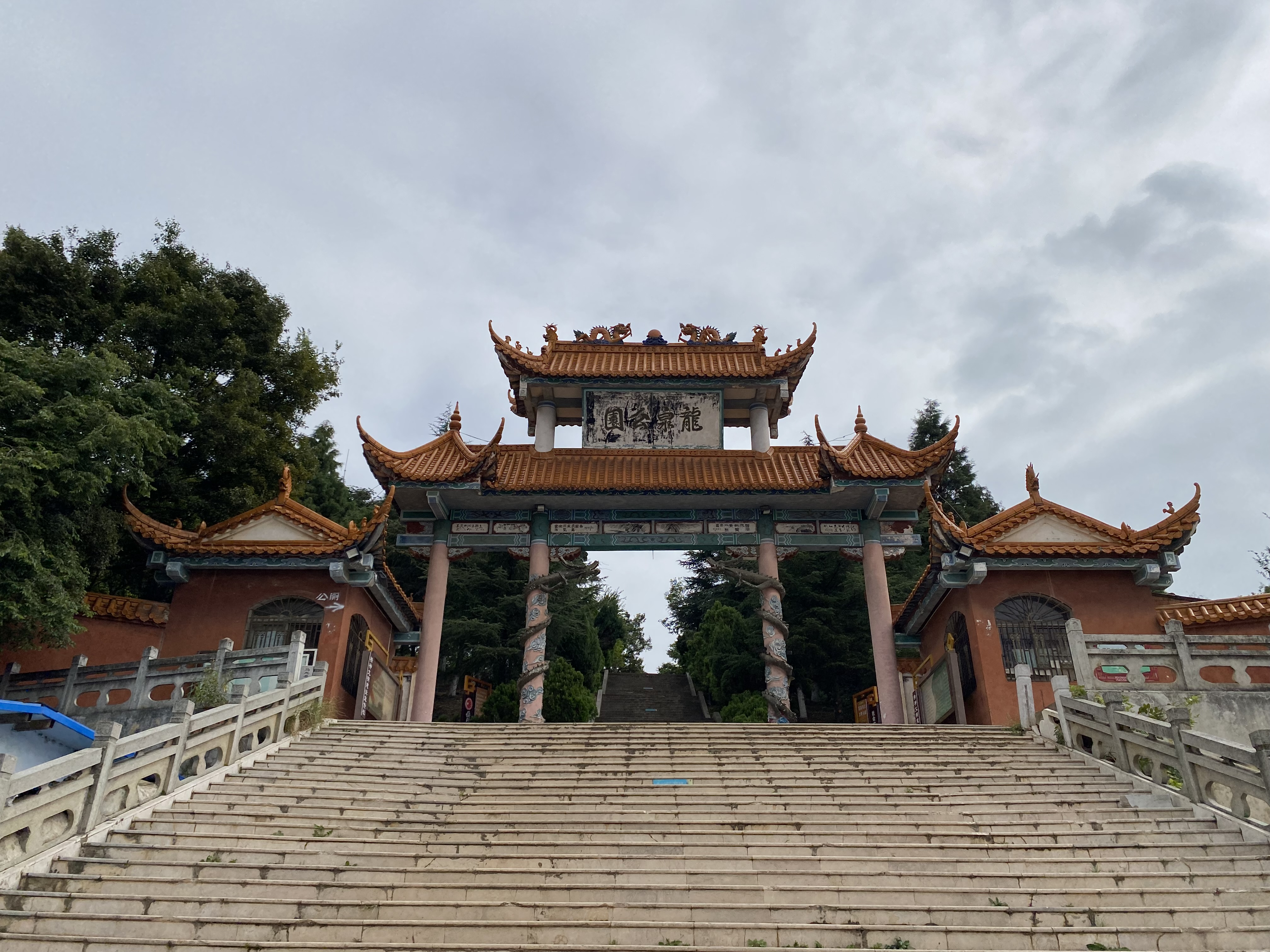
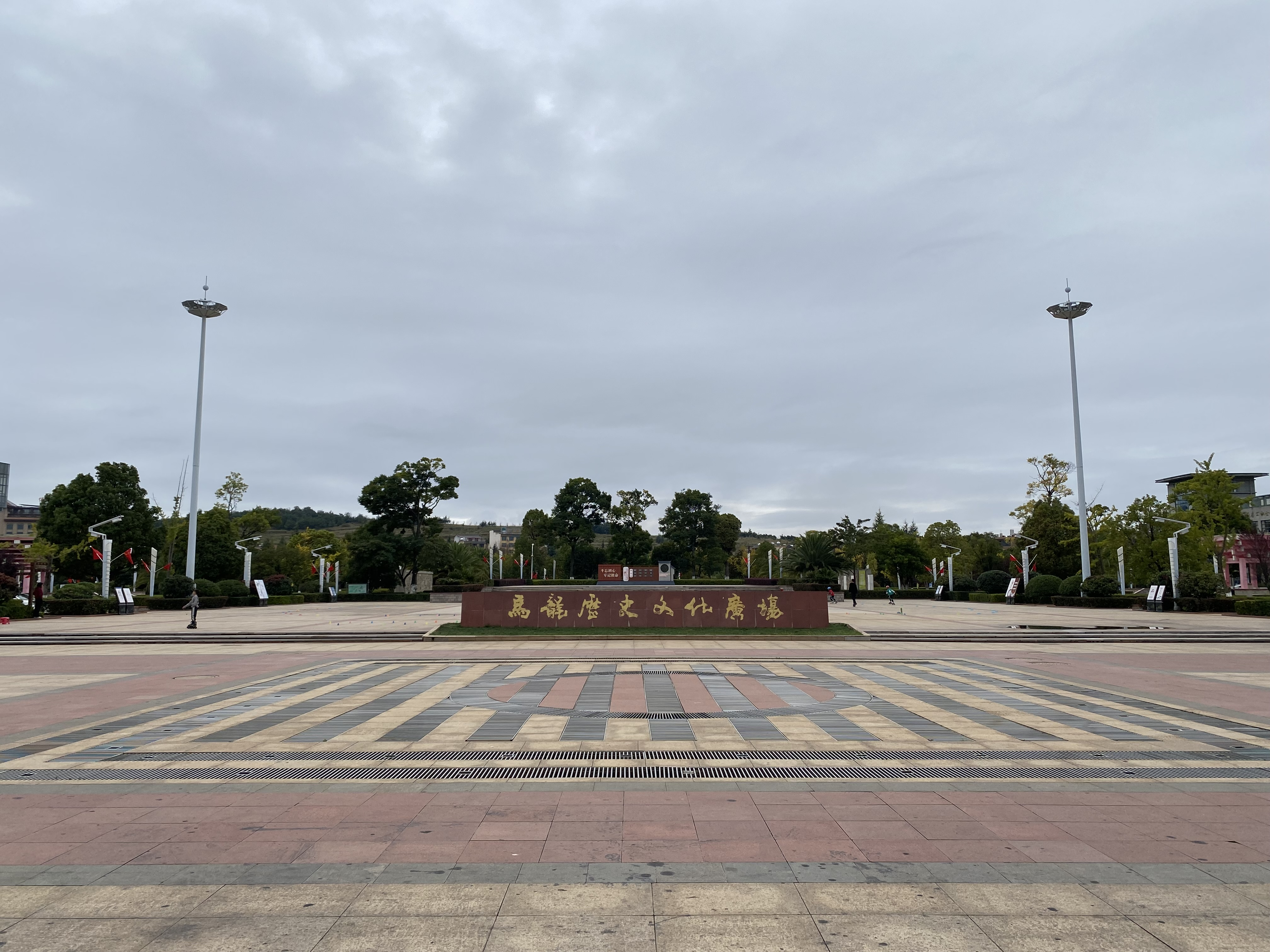
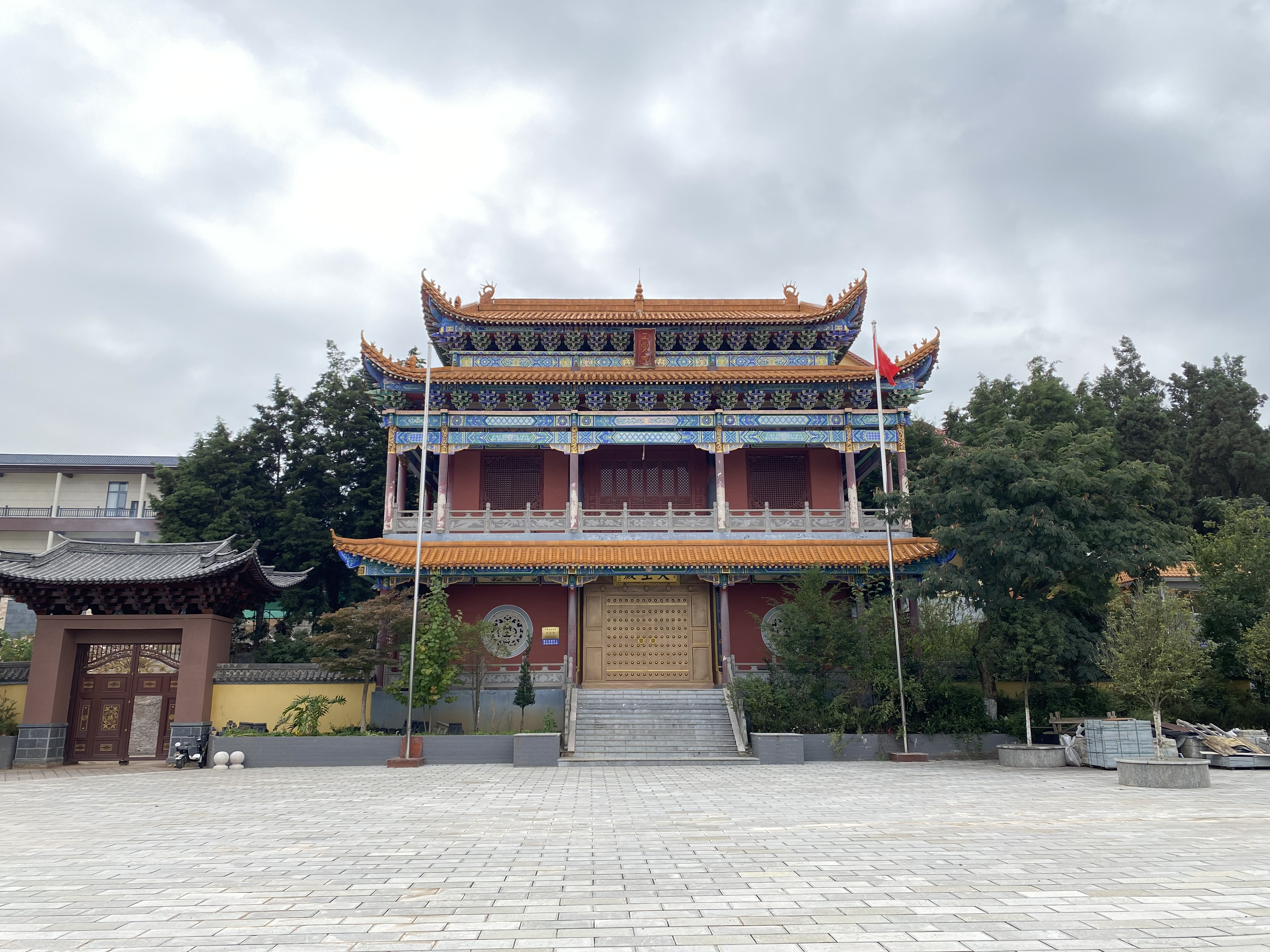
- Urban skyline Malong Grand Theatre Longquan Park Malong History & Culture Square Zhengjue Temple

- Location of Malong (red) and Qujing (pink) within Yunnan province of China
- Country: People's Republic of China
- Province: Yunnan
- Prefecture-level city: Qujing

Area
  - Total: 2,096 km^{2} (809 sq mi)

Population (2020)
  - Total: 193,137
  - Density: 92.15/km^{2} (238.7/sq mi)
- Time zone: UTC+8 (CST)
- Postal code: 655100
- Area code: 0874
- Website: http://www.malong.gov.cn/

Malong District (simplified Chinese: 马龙区; traditional Chinese: 馬龍區; pinyin: Mǎlóng Qū) is a district of the city of Qujing, Yunnan province, China. It borders Qilin District and Zhanyi District to the east and northeast, Luliang County and Yiliang County, Kunming to the south, and Songming County and Xundian County to the west and northwest.

== Administrative divisions ==
Malong District has 5 subdistricts, 2 towns and 3 townships.

5 subdistricts

- Tongquan (通泉街道)
- Jitoucun (鸡头村街道)
- Wangjiazhuang (王家庄街道)
- Zhang'antun (张安屯街道)
- Jiuxian (旧县街道)

2 towns

- Maguohe (马过河镇)
- Nazhang (纳章镇)

3 townships

- Maming (马鸣乡)
- Dazhuang (大庄乡)
- Yuewang (月望乡)

== Climate ==
Climate data for Malong District, elevation 2,067 m (6,781 ft), (1991–2020 normals, extremes 1981–present)
Month	Jan	Feb	Mar	Apr	May	Jun	Jul	Aug	Sep	Oct	Nov	Dec	Year
Record high °C (°F)	23.0 (73.4)	26.0 (78.8)	28.1 (82.6)	30.2 (86.4)	31.7 (89.1)	30.4 (86.7)	29.9 (85.8)	29.6 (85.3)	29.4 (84.9)	26.2 (79.2)	25.2 (77.4)	23.8 (74.8)	31.7 (89.1)
Mean daily maximum °C (°F)	14.3 (57.7)	16.5 (61.7)	20.4 (68.7)	23.2 (73.8)	24.1 (75.4)	23.9 (75.0)	23.7 (74.7)	23.8 (74.8)	22.0 (71.6)	19.2 (66.6)	17.0 (62.6)	14.0 (57.2)	20.2 (68.3)
Daily mean °C (°F)	7.4 (45.3)	9.4 (48.9)	13.1 (55.6)	16.0 (60.8)	17.8 (64.0)	18.8 (65.8)	18.8 (65.8)	18.5 (65.3)	16.8 (62.2)	14.0 (57.2)	10.6 (51.1)	7.5 (45.5)	14.1 (57.3)
Mean daily minimum °C (°F)	2.9 (37.2)	4.5 (40.1)	7.7 (45.9)	10.5 (50.9)	13.2 (55.8)	15.5 (59.9)	15.9 (60.6)	15.3 (59.5)	13.6 (56.5)	11.0 (51.8)	6.5 (43.7)	3.4 (38.1)	10.0 (50.0)
Record low °C (°F)	−6.7 (19.9)	−7.2 (19.0)	−6.8 (19.8)	−0.4 (31.3)	3.2 (37.8)	7.9 (46.2)	9.0 (48.2)	9.1 (48.4)	3.9 (39.0)	1.4 (34.5)	−4.8 (23.4)	−12.6 (9.3)	−12.6 (9.3)
Average precipitation mm (inches)	26.4 (1.04)	15.4 (0.61)	23.7 (0.93)	32.5 (1.28)	88.0 (3.46)	193.8 (7.63)	183.2 (7.21)	146.8 (5.78)	107.7 (4.24)	84.5 (3.33)	31.6 (1.24)	17.4 (0.69)	951 (37.44)
Average precipitation days (≥ 0.1 mm)	6.9	6.5	6.8	8.1	11.9	17.0	18.9	18.2	14.0	13.5	7.2	6.5	135.5
Average snowy days	2.8	1.6	0.5	0	0	0	0	0	0	0	0.2	1.1	6.2
Average relative humidity (%)	69	61	55	57	67	79	82	81	81	83	77	75	72
Mean monthly sunshine hours	201.7	204.7	246.3	246.6	210.1	137.9	130.4	149.3	132.9	133.3	179.5	179.2	2,151.9
Percentage possible sunshine	61	64	66	64	51	34	31	37	36	38	55	55	49
Source: China Meteorological Administrationall-time November record
