= Xuanwei =

Xuanwei 宣威市
- County-level city
- Location of Xuanwei City (red) and Qujing Prefecture (pink) within Yunnan province of China

- Location of the city center in Yunnan
- Coordinates: 26°13′05″N 104°06′11″E
- Country: People's Republic of China
- Province: Yunnan
- Prefecture-level city: Qujing

Area
  - Total: 6,705 km^{2} (2,589 sq mi)

Population (2020)
  - Total: 1,189,813
  - Density: 177.5/km^{2} (459.6/sq mi)
- Time zone: UTC+8 (CST)
- Postal code: 655400
- Area code: 0874
- Website: www.xw.gov.cn

Xuanwei (Chinese: 宣威; pinyin: Xuānwēi) is a county-level city in the northeast of Yunnan Province, China, bordering Guizhou province to the north and east. It is under the administration of the prefecture-level city of Qujing.

== Geography ==
Xuanwei is located in northeastern Yunnan. It borders Panzhou, Guizhou to the east, Zhanyi District and Fuyuan County, Yunnan to the south, Huize County across the Niulan River to the west, and Weining County and Shuicheng District, Guizhou to the north.

== Administrative divisions ==
Xuanwei City has 9 subdistricts, 13 towns and 7 townships.

9 subdistricts

- Wanshui (宛水街道)
- Xining (西宁街道)
- Shuanglong (双龙街道)
- Hongqiao (虹桥街道)
- Fenghua (丰华街道)
- Yanjing (板桥街道)
- Laibin (来宾街道)
- Fenghuang (凤凰街道)
- Fuxing (复兴街道)

13 towns

- Geyi (格宜镇)
- Tianba (田坝镇)
- Yangchang (羊场镇)
- Tangtang (倘塘镇)
- Luoshui (落水镇)
- Wude (务德镇)
- Haidai (海岱镇)
- Longchang (龙场镇)
- Longtan (龙潭镇)
- Reshui (热水镇)
- Baoshan (宝山镇)
- Dongshan (东山镇)
- Yangliu (杨柳镇)

7 townships

- Puli (普立乡)
- Xize (西泽乡)
- Delu (得禄乡)
- Shuanghe (双河乡)
- Lefeng (乐丰乡)
- Wenxing (文兴乡)
- Adou (阿都乡)

== Demographics ==
The population of Xuanwei is predominantly Han, with the ethnic minority population comprising members of the Yi, Zhuang, Miao, and Hui ethnic groups.

== Food ==
It is famous as the origin of Xuanwei ham, which is ham that is dry-cured.

== Climate ==
Climate data for Xuanwei, elevation 1,984 m (6,509 ft), (1991–2020 normals, extremes 1981–2010)
Month	Jan	Feb	Mar	Apr	May	Jun	Jul	Aug	Sep	Oct	Nov	Dec	Year
Record high °C (°F)	25.4 (77.7)	28.2 (82.8)	30.2 (86.4)	32.5 (90.5)	33.7 (92.7)	33.9 (93.0)	30.5 (86.9)	30.2 (86.4)	30.5 (86.9)	27.1 (80.8)	26.3 (79.3)	25.2 (77.4)	33.9 (93.0)
Mean daily maximum °C (°F)	13.6 (56.5)	16.0 (60.8)	20.5 (68.9)	23.5 (74.3)	24.6 (76.3)	24.6 (76.3)	25.0 (77.0)	25.0 (77.0)	22.8 (73.0)	19.3 (66.7)	17.0 (62.6)	13.6 (56.5)	20.5 (68.8)
Daily mean °C (°F)	6.3 (43.3)	8.5 (47.3)	12.4 (54.3)	15.9 (60.6)	18.1 (64.6)	19.3 (66.7)	19.8 (67.6)	19.4 (66.9)	17.4 (63.3)	14.1 (57.4)	10.4 (50.7)	6.8 (44.2)	14.0 (57.2)
Mean daily minimum °C (°F)	1.6 (34.9)	3.4 (38.1)	6.7 (44.1)	10.2 (50.4)	13.3 (55.9)	15.7 (60.3)	16.4 (61.5)	15.8 (60.4)	13.9 (57.0)	11.0 (51.8)	6.2 (43.2)	2.4 (36.3)	9.7 (49.5)
Record low °C (°F)	−10.6 (12.9)	−6.3 (20.7)	−6.6 (20.1)	−1.9 (28.6)	2.4 (36.3)	7.1 (44.8)	6.5 (43.7)	7.0 (44.6)	2.2 (36.0)	−0.7 (30.7)	−6.7 (19.9)	−11.6 (11.1)	−11.6 (11.1)
Average precipitation mm (inches)	18.3 (0.72)	12.9 (0.51)	23.2 (0.91)	37.8 (1.49)	90.7 (3.57)	215.5 (8.48)	175.3 (6.90)	136.2 (5.36)	127.4 (5.02)	88.3 (3.48)	23.9 (0.94)	12.3 (0.48)	961.8 (37.86)
Average precipitation days (≥ 0.1 mm)	7.6	6.8	7.9	9.1	14.2	18.7	17.9	17.2	14.7	14.5	7.2	7.0	142.8
Average snowy days	4.7	3.4	1.0	0	0	0	0	0	0	0	0.5	2.7	12.3
Average relative humidity (%)	67	61	57	57	64	75	77	76	77	78	72	71	69
Mean monthly sunshine hours	154.9	174.6	213.6	209.8	180.1	126.3	133.4	142.3	117.5	105.7	141.0	135.7	1,834.9
Percentage possible sunshine	47	55	57	54	43	31	32	36	32	30	44	42	42
Source: China Meteorological Administration
