= Yiliang County, Kunming =

Coordinates: 24°54′49″N 103°08′52″E

Yiliang County 宜良县
- County
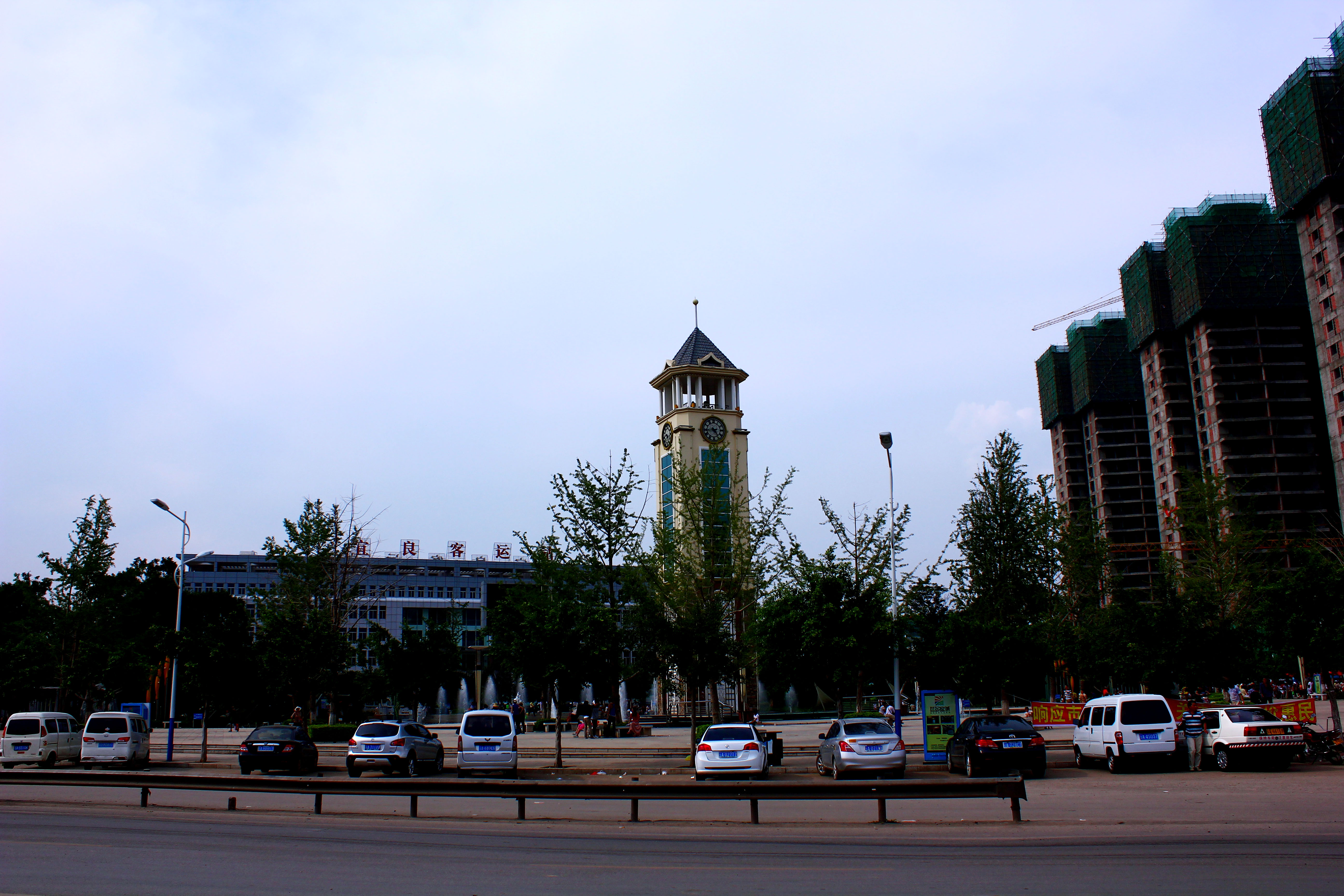
- Yiliang County Coach Station

- Location of Yiliang County (red) and Kunming City (pink) within Yunnan
- Country: People's Republic of China
- Province: Yunnan
- Prefecture: Kunming
- Established: 1956

Area
  - Total: 1,880 km^{2} (730 sq mi)

Population (2020)
  - Total: 384,875
  - Density: 205/km^{2} (530/sq mi)
- Time zone: UTC+8 (CST)
- Postal code: 652100
- Area code: 0871
- Website: http://www.yiliang-china.com/

Yiliang County (Chinese: 宜良县; pinyin: Yíliáng Xiàn) is a county, under the jurisdiction of Kunming, the capital of Yunnan province, China. It borders Luliang County and Shilin County to the east, Mile City and Huaning County to the south, Chengjiang, Chenggong District and Guandu District to the west, and Songming County and Malong District to the north.

== Administrative divisions ==
- Kuangyuan Town (匡远镇)
- Beigucheng Town (北古城镇)
- Tangchi Town (汤池镇)
- Goujie Town (狗街镇)
- Gengjiaying Yi Nationality & Miao Nationality Village (耿家营彝族苗族乡)
- Jiuxiang Yi Nationality & Hui Nationality Village (九乡彝族回族乡)
- Majie Village (马街乡)
- Zhushan Village (竹山乡)

== Climate ==
Climate data for Yiliang, elevation 1,533 m (5,030 ft), (1991–2020 normals, extremes 1981–present)
Month	Jan	Feb	Mar	Apr	May	Jun	Jul	Aug	Sep	Oct	Nov	Dec	Year
Record high °C (°F)	27.8 (82.0)	29.6 (85.3)	31.3 (88.3)	34.2 (93.6)	35.5 (95.9)	34.5 (94.1)	33.7 (92.7)	33.5 (92.3)	33.7 (92.7)	30.3 (86.5)	28.9 (84.0)	26.7 (80.1)	35.5 (95.9)
Mean daily maximum °C (°F)	18.2 (64.8)	20.5 (68.9)	24.5 (76.1)	27.3 (81.1)	27.5 (81.5)	27.3 (81.1)	27.0 (80.6)	27.2 (81.0)	26.0 (78.8)	23.2 (73.8)	20.6 (69.1)	17.6 (63.7)	23.9 (75.0)
Daily mean °C (°F)	9.6 (49.3)	11.8 (53.2)	15.6 (60.1)	19.5 (67.1)	21.3 (70.3)	22.0 (71.6)	21.9 (71.4)	21.5 (70.7)	20.1 (68.2)	17.4 (63.3)	13.2 (55.8)	9.9 (49.8)	17.0 (62.6)
Mean daily minimum °C (°F)	3.5 (38.3)	4.9 (40.8)	8.4 (47.1)	12.8 (55.0)	16.3 (61.3)	18.4 (65.1)	18.7 (65.7)	18.1 (64.6)	16.6 (61.9)	13.8 (56.8)	8.4 (47.1)	4.7 (40.5)	12.1 (53.7)
Record low °C (°F)	−3.4 (25.9)	−2.2 (28.0)	−4.2 (24.4)	3.3 (37.9)	6.8 (44.2)	9.9 (49.8)	12.9 (55.2)	11.6 (52.9)	7.6 (45.7)	4.8 (40.6)	−1.7 (28.9)	−10.1 (13.8)	−10.1 (13.8)
Average precipitation mm (inches)	20.8 (0.82)	14.3 (0.56)	20.5 (0.81)	24.3 (0.96)	77.4 (3.05)	161.1 (6.34)	175.7 (6.92)	144.0 (5.67)	95.4 (3.76)	81.3 (3.20)	34.6 (1.36)	16.2 (0.64)	865.6 (34.09)
Average precipitation days (≥ 0.1 mm)	5.2	4.7	5.1	6.3	10.7	15.9	18.8	17.1	12.6	12.2	6.5	4.9	120
Average snowy days	0.8	0.4	0.2	0	0	0	0	0	0	0	0	0.2	1.6
Average relative humidity (%)	71	64	58	56	65	77	81	81	79	79	77	76	72
Mean monthly sunshine hours	194.8	201.8	238.7	245.2	214.3	149.8	130.9	146.0	132.5	134.0	168.6	166.2	2,122.8
Percentage possible sunshine	58	63	64	64	52	37	31	37	36	38	52	51	49
Source: China Meteorological Administrationall-time October record
