= Yuezhou Town =

Town in Qilin District, Qujing, Yunnan, China

Coordinates: 25.3025°N 103.8697°E

Yuezhou (越州镇) is a town in Qilin District, Qujing, Yunnan, China.
