= Songming County =

Coordinates: 25°09′47″N 103°00′51″E

Songming County 嵩明县
- County
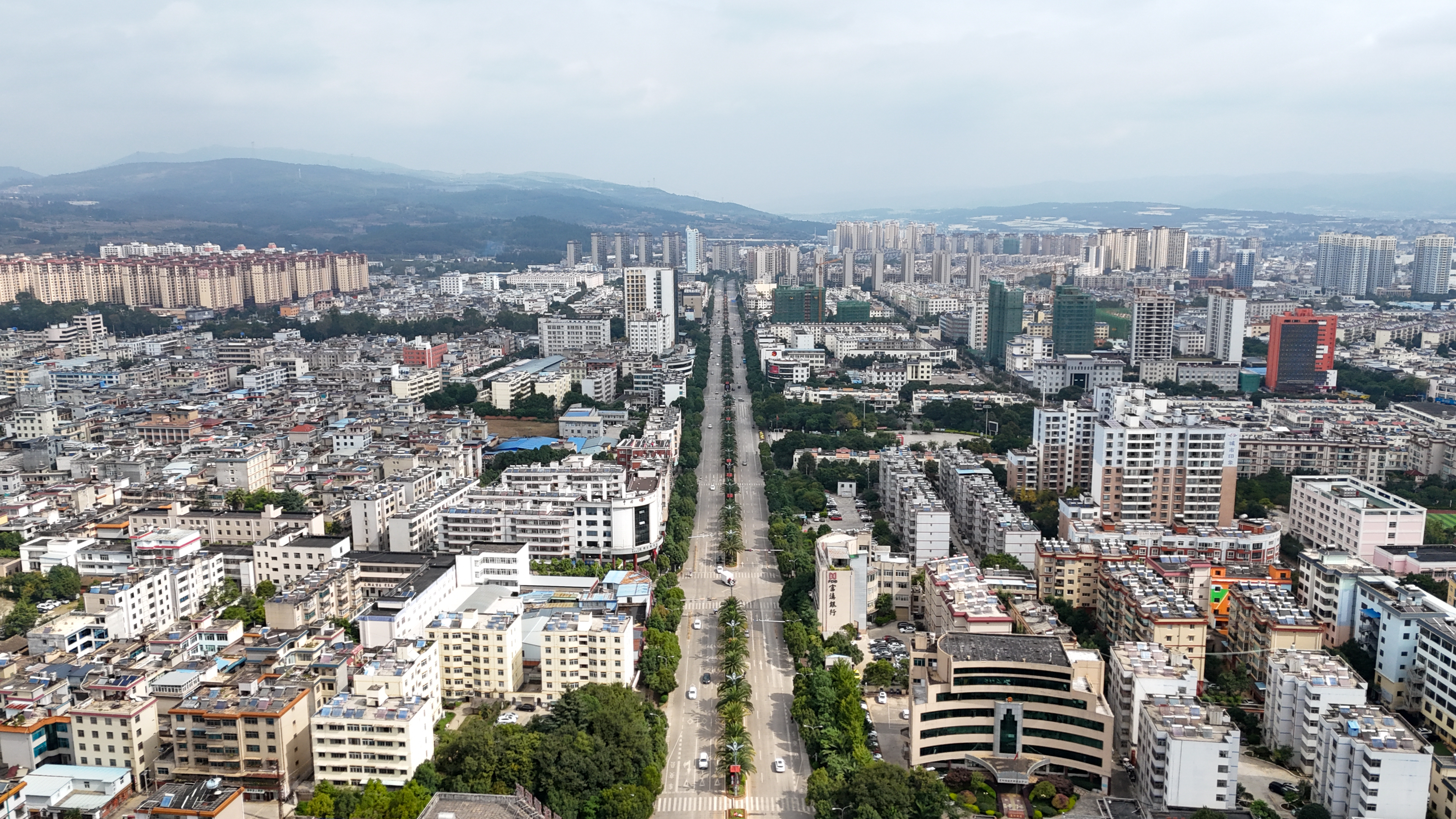
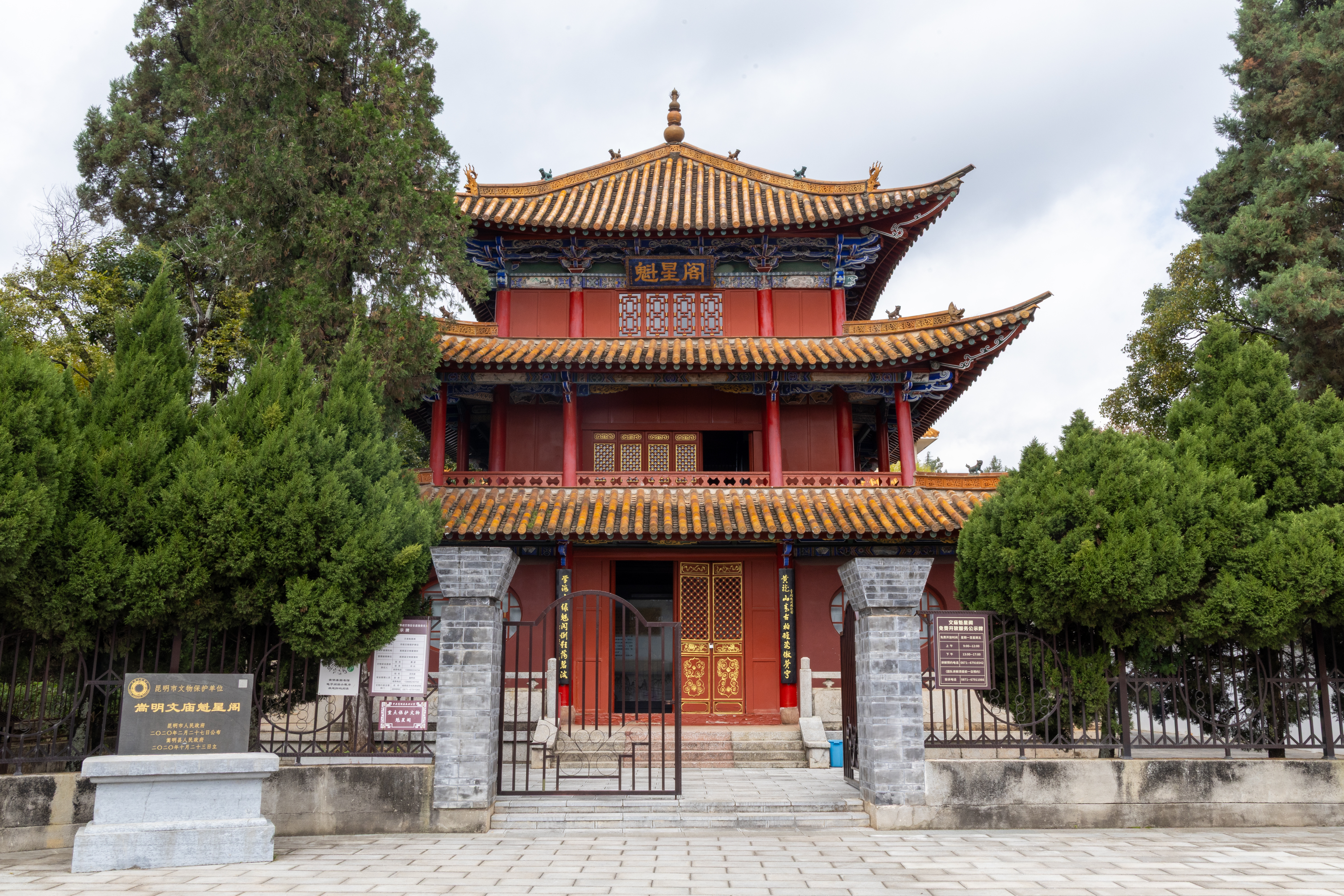
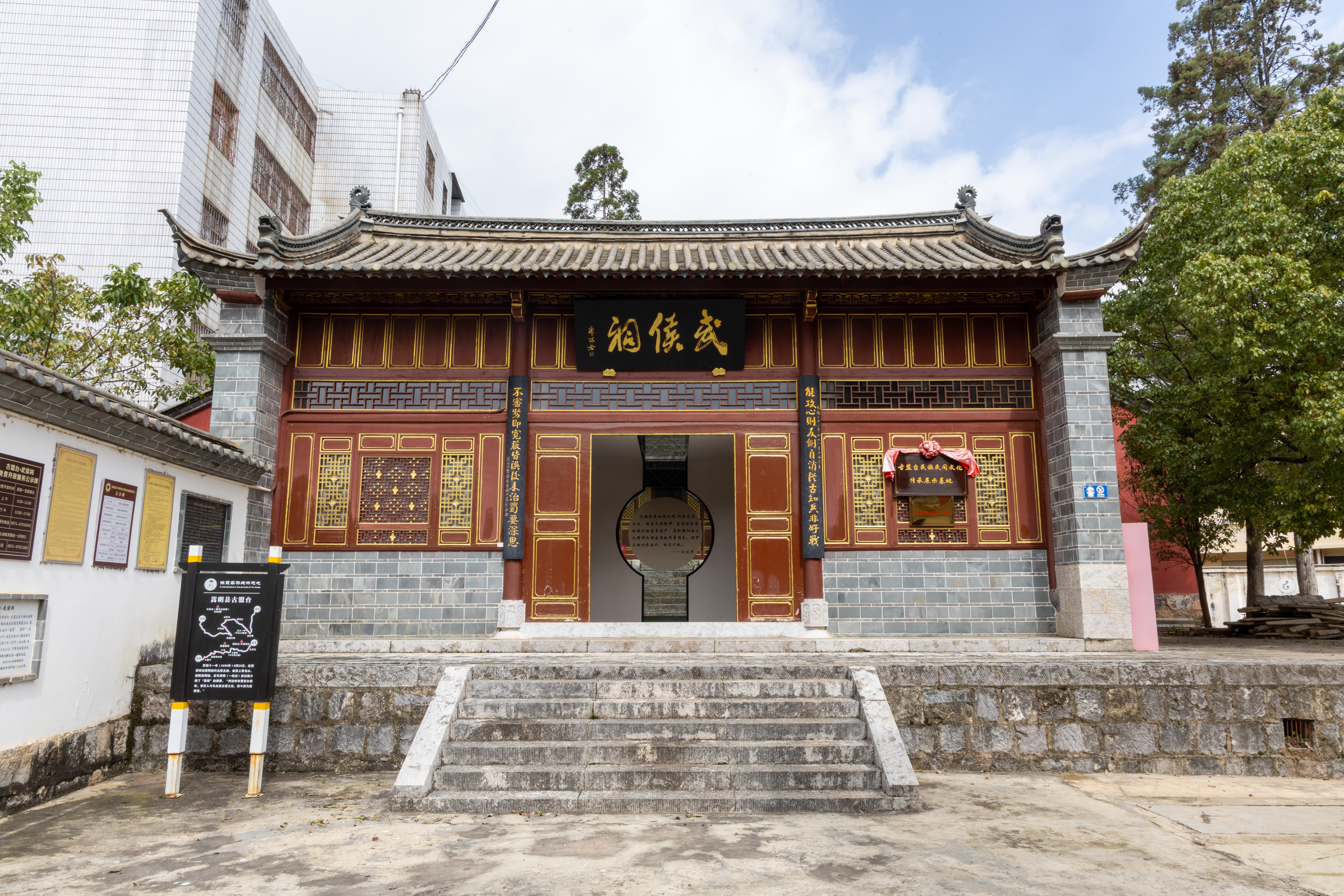
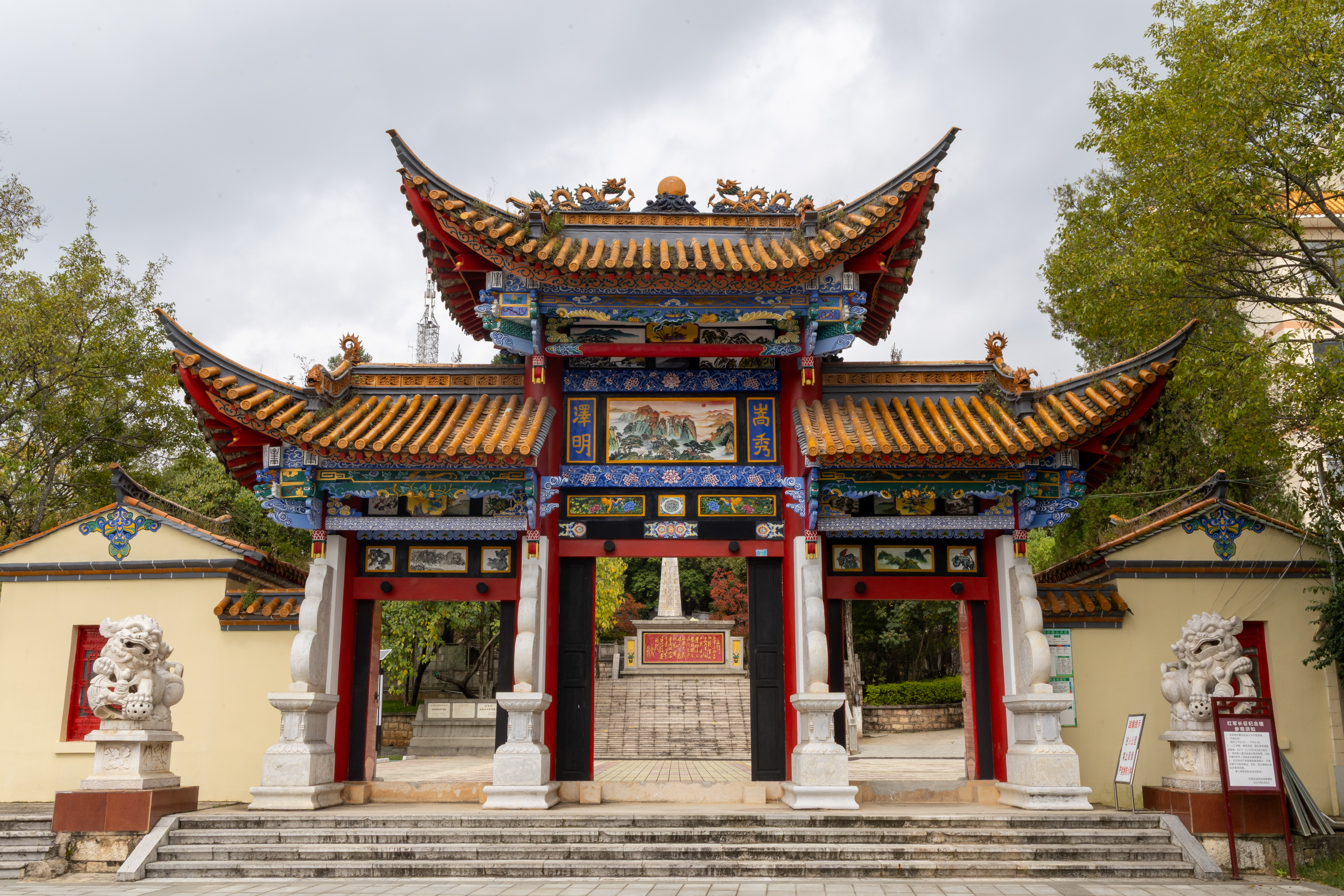
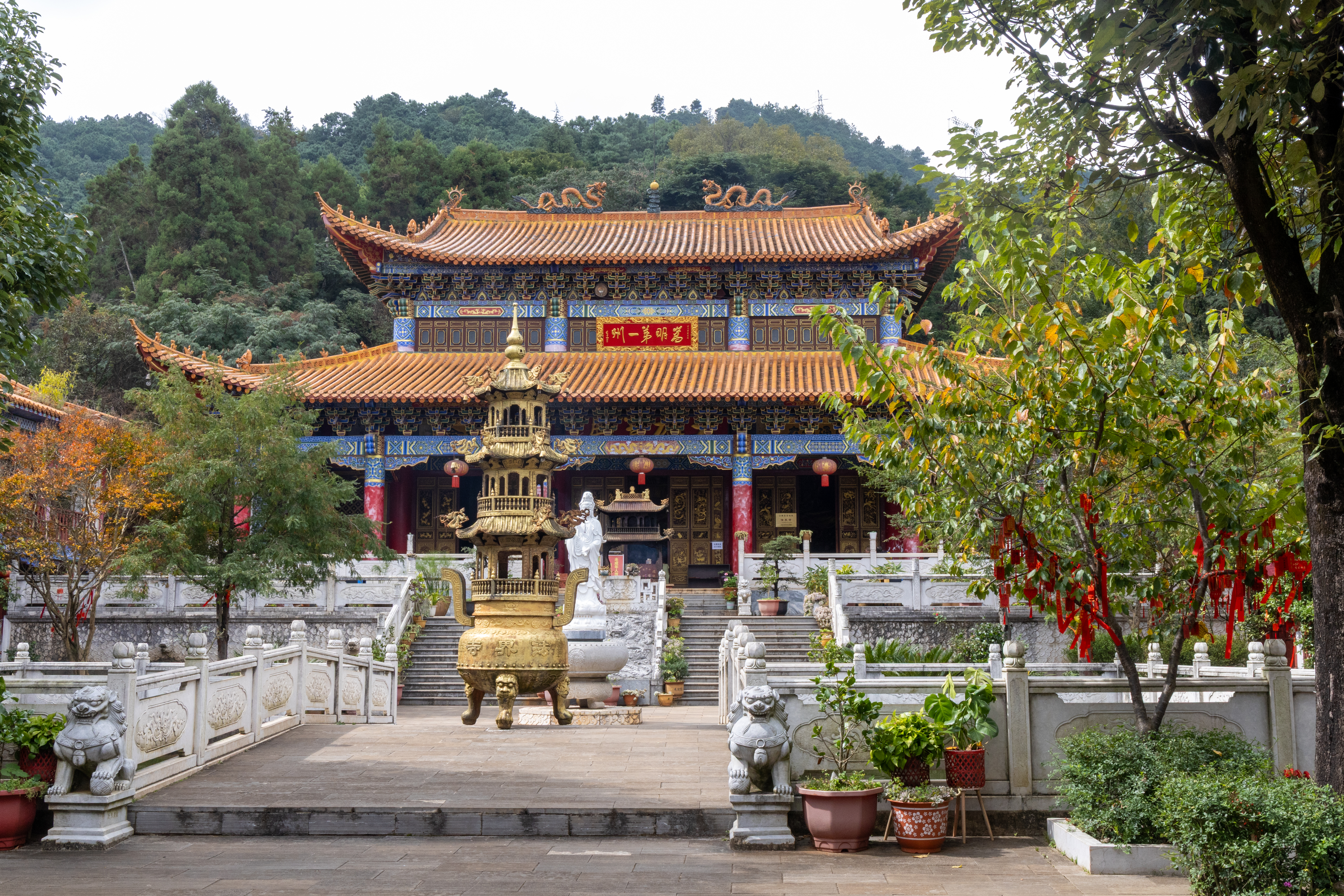
- Skyline of county town Kuixing Pavilion Temple of Marquis Wu Huanglong Mountain Park Fajie Temple

- Location of Songming County (red) and Kunming City (pink) within Yunnan
- Country: People's Republic of China
- Province: Yunnan
- Prefecture-level city: Kunming
- Established: 1956

Area
  - Total: 1,357 km^{2} (524 sq mi)

Population (2020 census)
  - Total: 410,929
  - Density: 302.8/km^{2} (784.3/sq mi)
- Time zone: UTC+8 (CST)
- Postal code: 651700
- Area code: 0871
- Website: www.smlm.gov.cn

Songming County (Chinese: 嵩明县; pinyin: Sōngmíng Xiàn) is a county under the jurisdiction of Kunming, the capital of Yunnan province, China. It is famous for the Yanglin Fat Liquor and the Dian Opera. It borders Malong District to the east, Yiliang County, Kunming and Guandu District to the south, Panlong District, Wuhua District and Fumin County to the west and Xundian County to the north. It is located in the northeast of Kunming.

== Administrative divisions ==
Songming County is divided into two subdistricts and three towns.

Subdistricts
Songyang (嵩阳街道), Yangqiao (杨桥街道)
Towns
Xiaojie (小街镇), Yanglin (杨林镇), Niulanjiang (牛栏江镇)

== Transport ==
- China National Highway 213

== Economy of Songming County ==
- Songming Yanglin Industrial Development Zone

== Climate ==
Climate data for Songming, elevation 1,916 m (6,286 ft), (1991–2020 normals, extremes 1981–present)
Month	Jan	Feb	Mar	Apr	May	Jun	Jul	Aug	Sep	Oct	Nov	Dec	Year
Record high °C (°F)	24.6 (76.3)	26.7 (80.1)	29.2 (84.6)	31.2 (88.2)	33.0 (91.4)	32.1 (89.8)	31.1 (88.0)	31.6 (88.9)	30.6 (87.1)	27.2 (81.0)	26.4 (79.5)	23.5 (74.3)	33.0 (91.4)
Mean daily maximum °C (°F)	15.7 (60.3)	17.9 (64.2)	21.6 (70.9)	24.4 (75.9)	25.2 (77.4)	25.1 (77.2)	24.7 (76.5)	24.9 (76.8)	23.2 (73.8)	20.7 (69.3)	18.3 (64.9)	15.5 (59.9)	21.4 (70.6)
Daily mean °C (°F)	7.8 (46.0)	9.8 (49.6)	13.4 (56.1)	16.6 (61.9)	18.9 (66.0)	20.0 (68.0)	19.9 (67.8)	19.4 (66.9)	17.7 (63.9)	15.1 (59.2)	11.2 (52.2)	8.0 (46.4)	14.8 (58.7)
Mean daily minimum °C (°F)	1.9 (35.4)	3.5 (38.3)	6.6 (43.9)	9.9 (49.8)	13.6 (56.5)	16.2 (61.2)	16.6 (61.9)	16.0 (60.8)	14.2 (57.6)	11.4 (52.5)	6.2 (43.2)	2.9 (37.2)	9.9 (49.9)
Record low °C (°F)	−6.2 (20.8)	−4.4 (24.1)	−7.2 (19.0)	−0.4 (31.3)	2.8 (37.0)	7.5 (45.5)	10.2 (50.4)	8.1 (46.6)	4.2 (39.6)	2.0 (35.6)	−5.2 (22.6)	−15.8 (3.6)	−15.8 (3.6)
Average precipitation mm (inches)	22.5 (0.89)	12.4 (0.49)	19.6 (0.77)	27.3 (1.07)	89.6 (3.53)	191.6 (7.54)	213.5 (8.41)	188.7 (7.43)	124.4 (4.90)	84.9 (3.34)	30.2 (1.19)	12.7 (0.50)	1,017.4 (40.06)
Average precipitation days (≥ 0.1 mm)	5.1	4.9	5.9	7.4	12.2	17.6	20.4	19.4	16.2	13.4	6.1	4.5	133.1
Average snowy days	1.9	1.1	0.4	0	0	0	0	0	0	0	0.2	0.7	4.3
Average relative humidity (%)	67	60	55	56	65	78	83	82	82	81	75	73	71
Mean monthly sunshine hours	197.2	196.5	231.7	230.9	188.7	113.4	98.8	117.3	96.4	109.6	166.5	172.8	1,919.8
Percentage possible sunshine	59	61	62	60	46	28	24	29	26	31	51	53	44
Source: China Meteorological Administrationall-time November record high
