= Xundian Hui and Yi Autonomous County =

Xundian County 寻甸县 · ثٌدِیًا شِیًا
- Autonomous county
- 寻甸回族彝族自治县 ثٌدِیًا خُوِذُو یِذُو ذِجِشِیًا; Xundian Hui and Yi Autonomous County
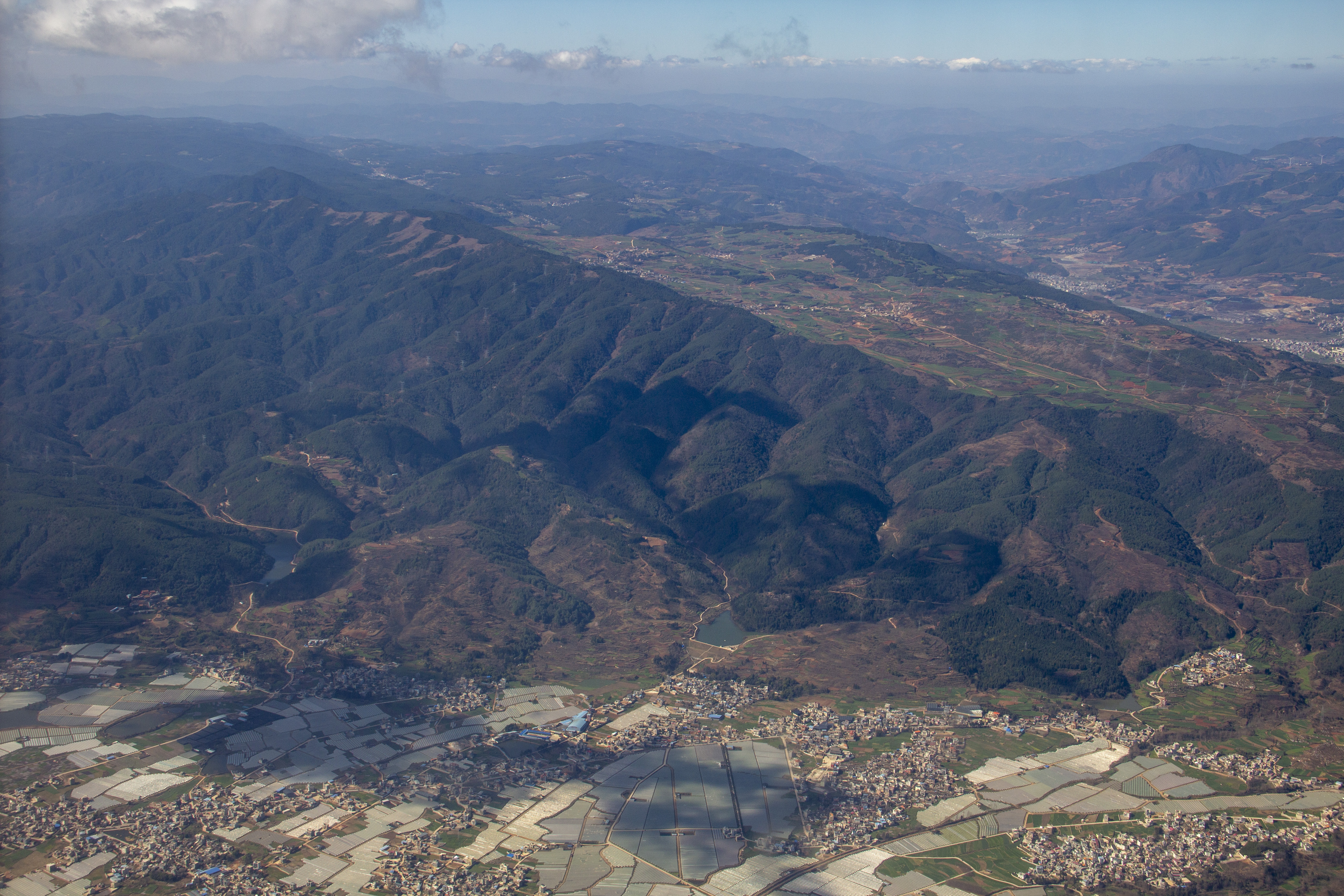

- Location of Xundian County (red) and Kunming City (pink) within Yunnan
- Coordinates: 25°33′22″N 103°15′32″E
- Country: China
- Province: Yunnan
- Prefecture-level city: Kunming
- Established: 1956
- County seat: Rende Subdistrict

Area
  - Total: 3,699 km^{2} (1,428 sq mi)

Population (2020 census)
  - Total: 460,739
  - Density: 124.6/km^{2} (322.6/sq mi)
- Time zone: UTC+8 (CST)
- Postal code: 655200
- Area code: 0871
- Website: www.kmxd.gov.cn

Xundian Hui and Yi Autonomous County (simplified Chinese: 寻甸回族彝族自治县; traditional Chinese: 尋甸回族彝族自治縣; pinyin: Xúndiàn Huízú Yízú Zìzhìxiàn; Xiao'erjing: ثٌدِیًا خُوِذُو یِذُو ذِجِشِیًا) is an autonomous county in the northeast of Yunnan province, China. It is under the administration of the prefecture-level city of Kunming, the provincial capital.

== Geography ==
Xundian lies northeast of the center of Yunnan. The Niulan River (牛栏江) flows through its territory.

Xundian borders Malong District, Zhanyi District and Huize County to the east, Fumin County and Luquan County to the west, Dongchuan District and Huize County to the north, and Songming County and Panlong District to the south.

== Administrative divisions ==
Xundian is divided into 3 subdistricts, 9 towns and 4 townships:

Subdistricts:

- Rende Subdistrict (仁德街道), Tangzi Subdistrict (塘子街道), Jinsuo Subdistrict (金所街道)

Towns:

- Yangjie Town (羊街镇), Kedu Town (柯渡镇), Tangdian Town (倘甸镇), Gongshan Town (功山镇), Hekou Town (河口镇), Qixing Town (七星镇), Xianfeng Town (先锋镇), Jijie Town (鸡街镇), Fenghe Town (凤合镇)

Townships:

- Liushao Township (六哨乡), Lianhe Township (联合乡), Jinyuan Township (金源乡), and Diansha Township (甸沙乡).

== Ethnic groups ==
Yi ethnic subgroups in Xundian County are Black Yi 黑彝, White Yi 白彝, and Dry Yi 干彝 (Xundian County Gazetteer 1999:118). Black Yi and White Yi are widespread, while Dry Yi is restricted to Gongshan Town 功山镇 and Hekou Township 河口乡.

Other ethnic groups in Xundian are Miao (Big Flowery Miao 大花苗 subgroup), Hui, and Han (Xundian County Gazetteer 1999).

== Climate ==
Climate data for Xundian, elevation 1,866 m (6,122 ft), (1991–2020 normals, extremes 1991–present)
Month	Jan	Feb	Mar	Apr	May	Jun	Jul	Aug	Sep	Oct	Nov	Dec	Year
Record high °C (°F)	25.1 (77.2)	28.8 (83.8)	30.0 (86.0)	32.0 (89.6)	34.0 (93.2)	33.2 (91.8)	31.8 (89.2)	31.9 (89.4)	31.6 (88.9)	28.1 (82.6)	26.2 (79.2)	25.4 (77.7)	34.0 (93.2)
Mean daily maximum °C (°F)	16.0 (60.8)	18.2 (64.8)	22.1 (71.8)	25.0 (77.0)	26.0 (78.8)	25.8 (78.4)	25.5 (77.9)	25.6 (78.1)	23.7 (74.7)	21.0 (69.8)	18.7 (65.7)	15.8 (60.4)	22.0 (71.5)
Daily mean °C (°F)	8.3 (46.9)	10.4 (50.7)	14.1 (57.4)	17.3 (63.1)	19.3 (66.7)	20.4 (68.7)	20.4 (68.7)	19.9 (67.8)	18.2 (64.8)	15.4 (59.7)	11.5 (52.7)	8.4 (47.1)	15.3 (59.5)
Mean daily minimum °C (°F)	2.7 (36.9)	4.3 (39.7)	7.6 (45.7)	10.9 (51.6)	14.2 (57.6)	16.8 (62.2)	17.2 (63.0)	16.5 (61.7)	14.9 (58.8)	12.0 (53.6)	6.8 (44.2)	3.4 (38.1)	10.6 (51.1)
Record low °C (°F)	−8.9 (16.0)	−3.8 (25.2)	−4.0 (24.8)	1.7 (35.1)	4.5 (40.1)	9.6 (49.3)	11.8 (53.2)	9.6 (49.3)	5.3 (41.5)	3.9 (39.0)	−2.7 (27.1)	−6.2 (20.8)	−8.9 (16.0)
Average precipitation mm (inches)	22.4 (0.88)	14.6 (0.57)	17.6 (0.69)	26.7 (1.05)	90.6 (3.57)	184.8 (7.28)	214.9 (8.46)	181.5 (7.15)	137.3 (5.41)	87.3 (3.44)	29.1 (1.15)	12.0 (0.47)	1,018.8 (40.12)
Average precipitation days (≥ 0.1 mm)	5.3	4.6	5.7	7.7	12.0	17.4	20.1	18.3	16.1	13.6	5.8	4.4	131
Average snowy days	2.2	1.2	0.4	0	0	0	0	0	0	0	0.2	1.1	5.1
Average relative humidity (%)	65	59	54	55	64	76	81	81	81	81	75	72	70
Mean monthly sunshine hours	197.0	203.2	241.4	238.9	202.3	133.1	118.1	135.3	114.6	120.2	168.1	174.4	2,046.6
Percentage possible sunshine	59	63	64	62	49	32	28	34	31	34	52	53	47
Source: China Meteorological Administration

== Industrial Parks ==
- Xundian Special Industrial Park

== Gallery ==
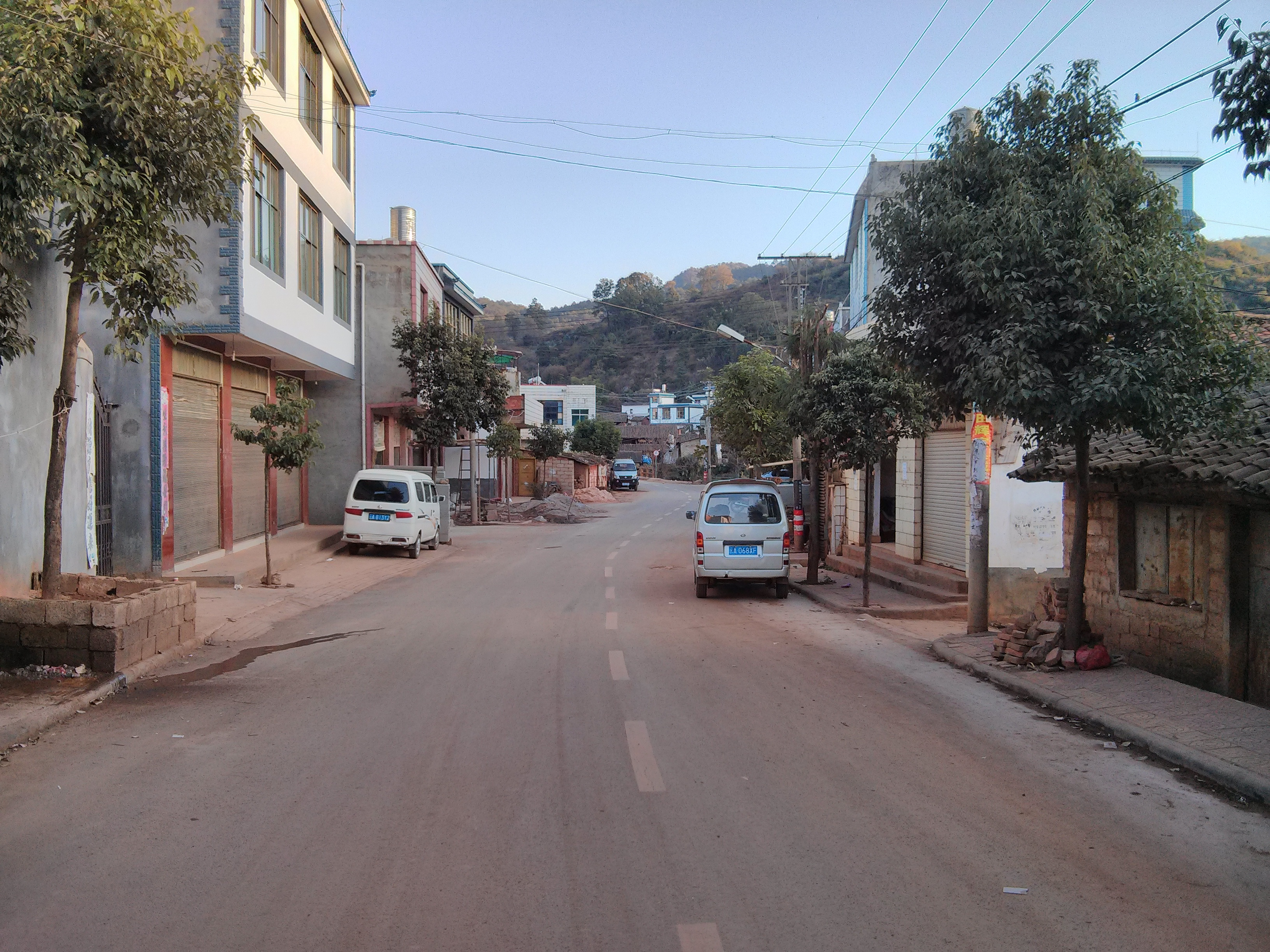
Hekou Township (河口乡) in Xundian County

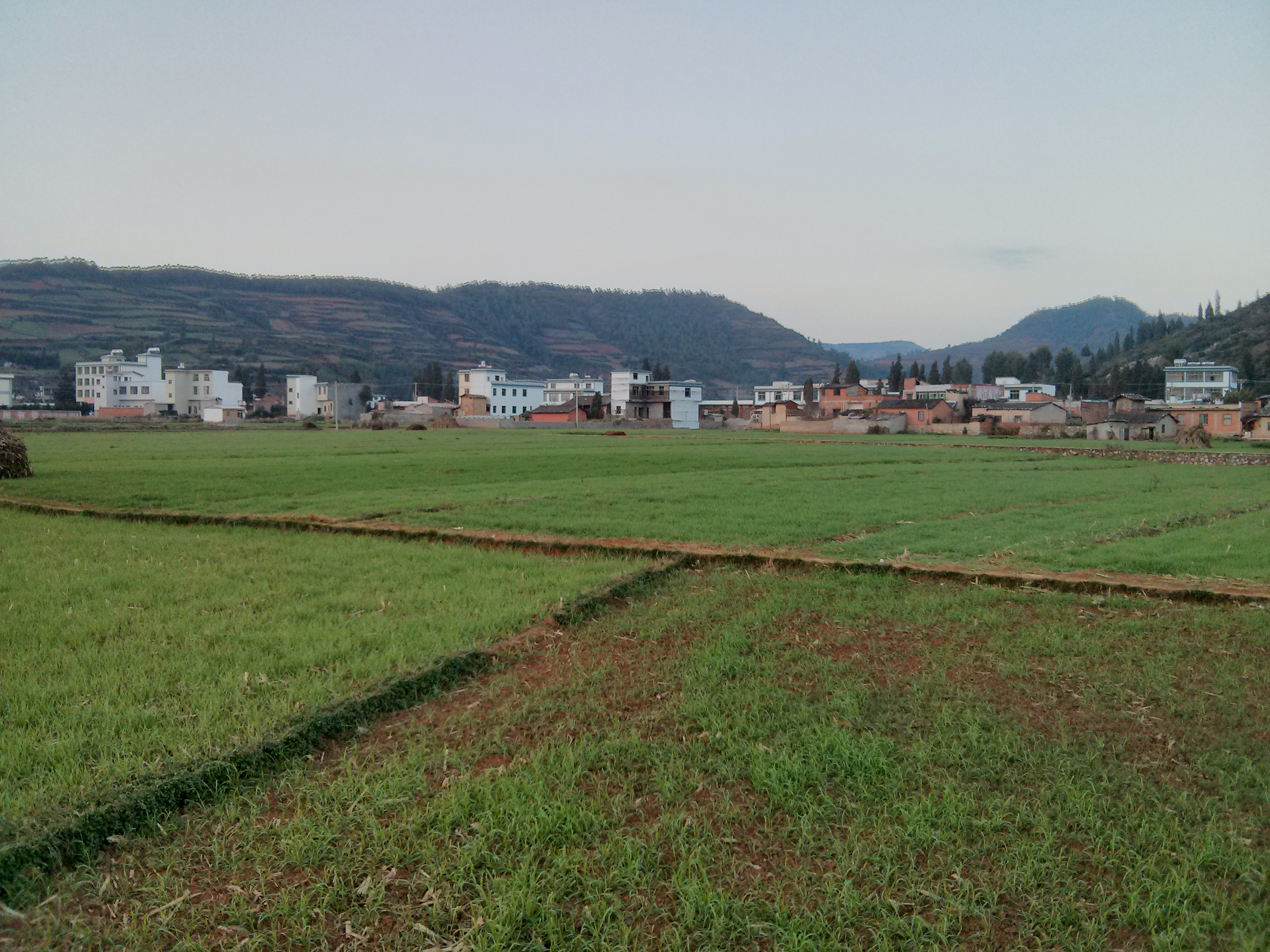
Field in Hekou Township, Xundian County

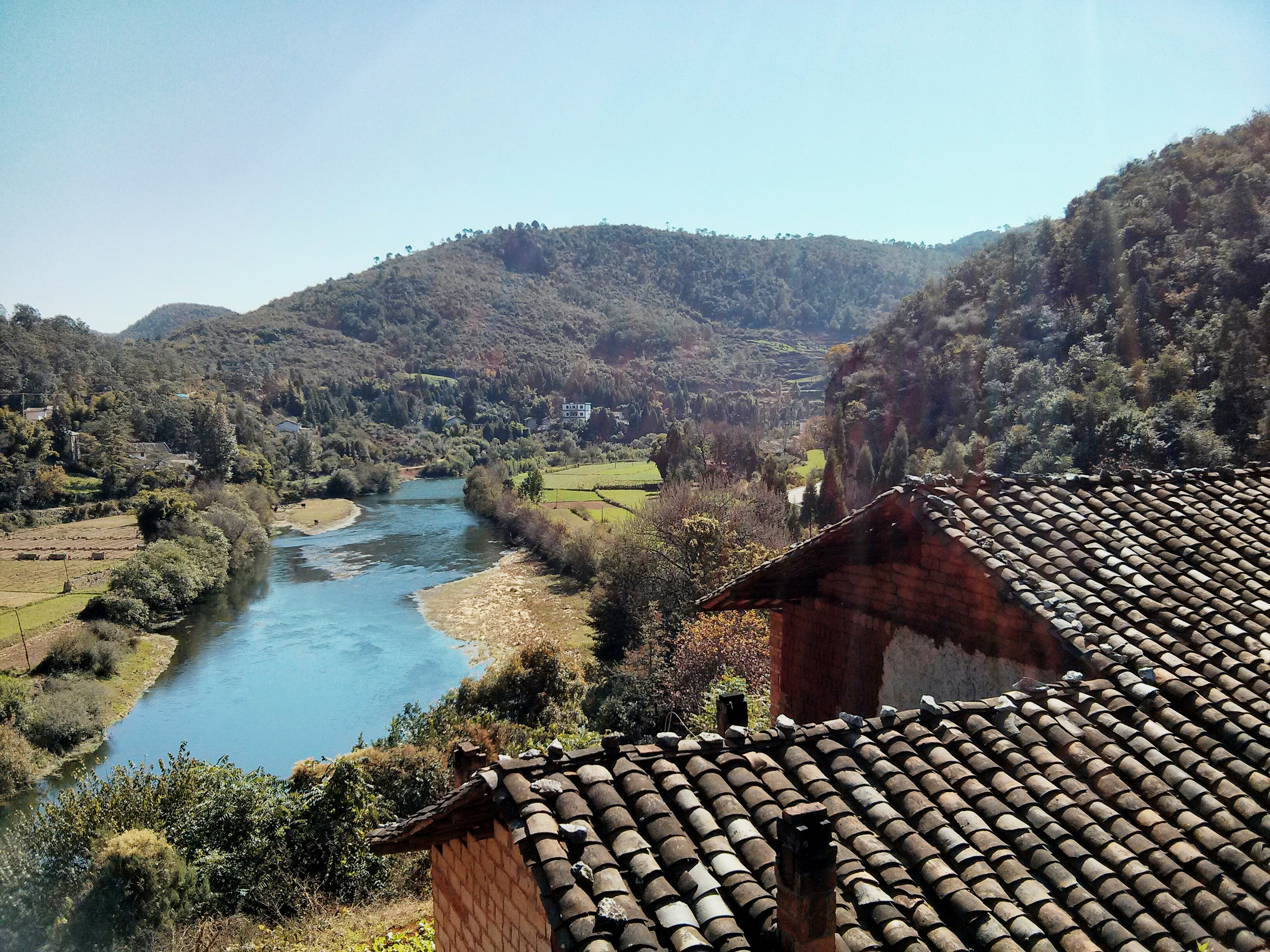
House in Xundian County
