= Qujing =

Qujing 曲靖市 Kutsing
- Prefecture-level city
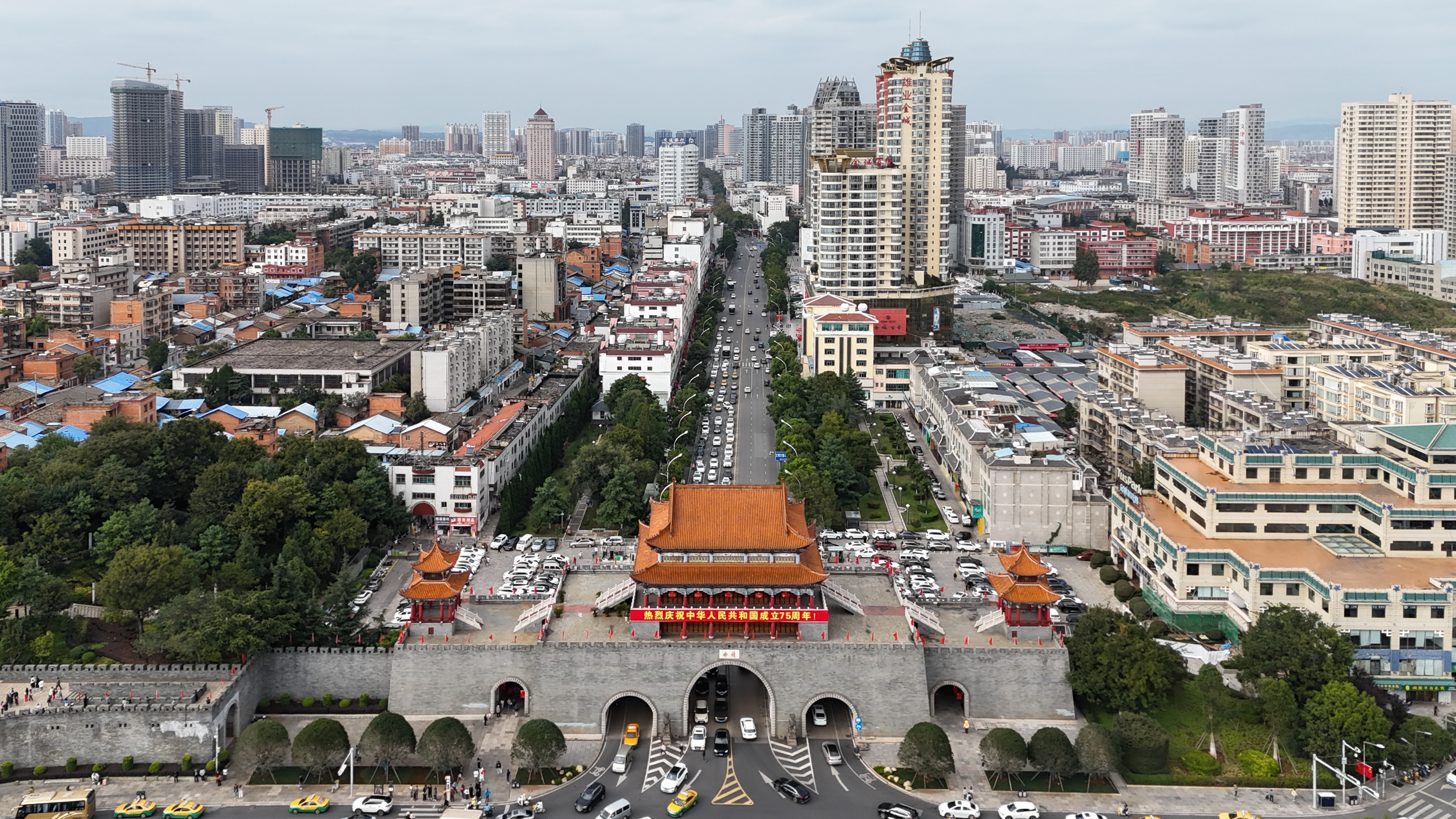
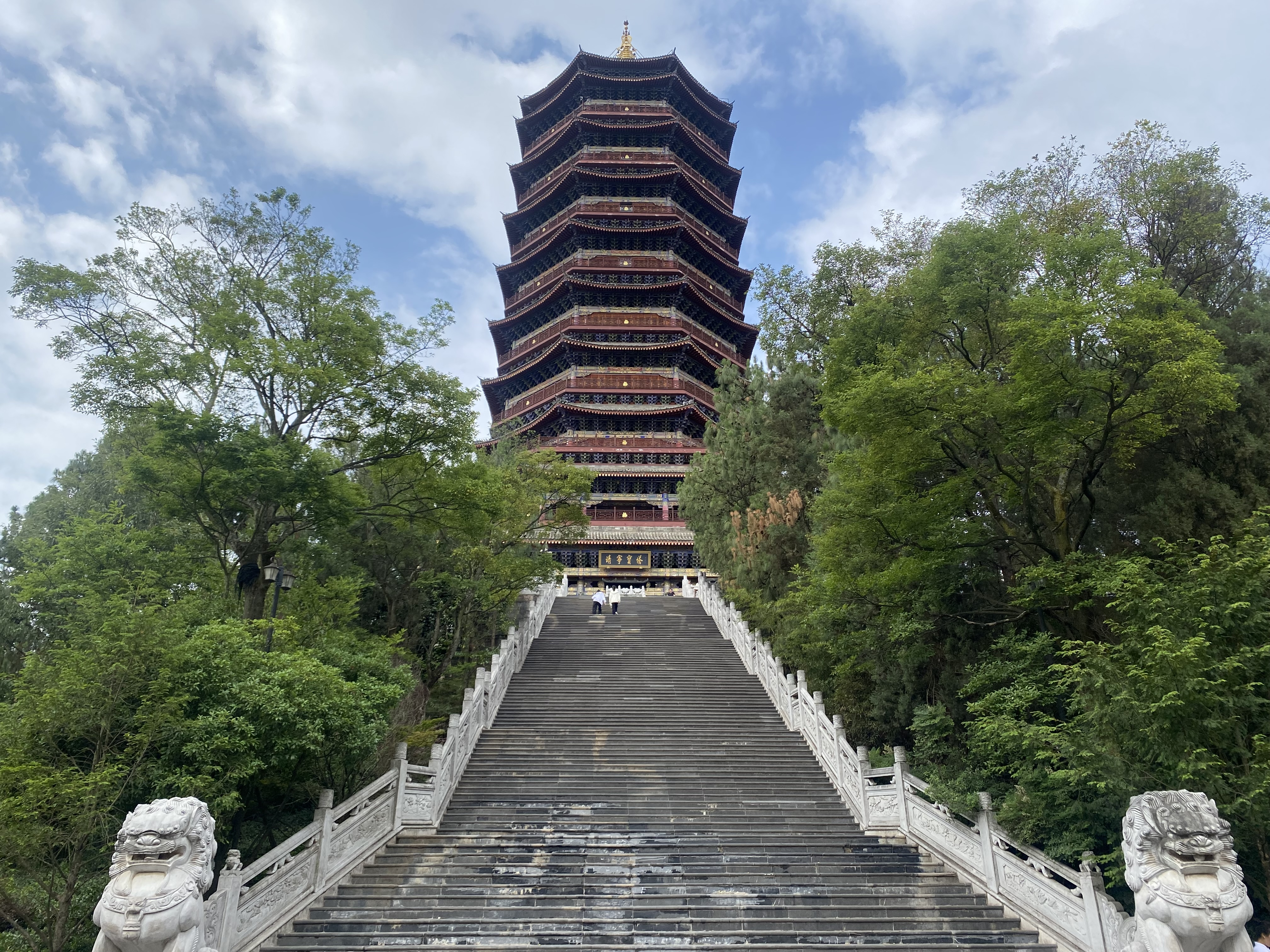
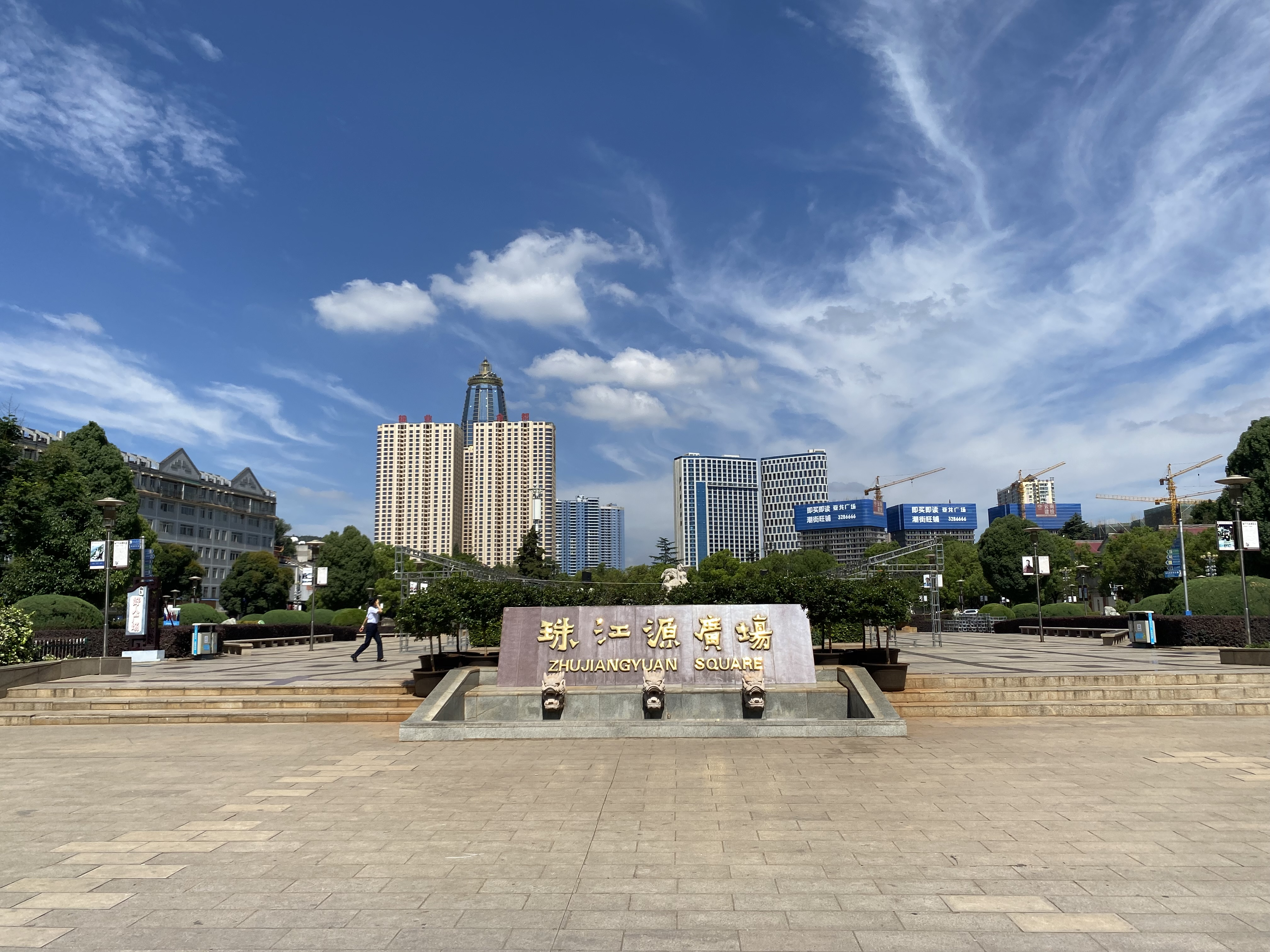
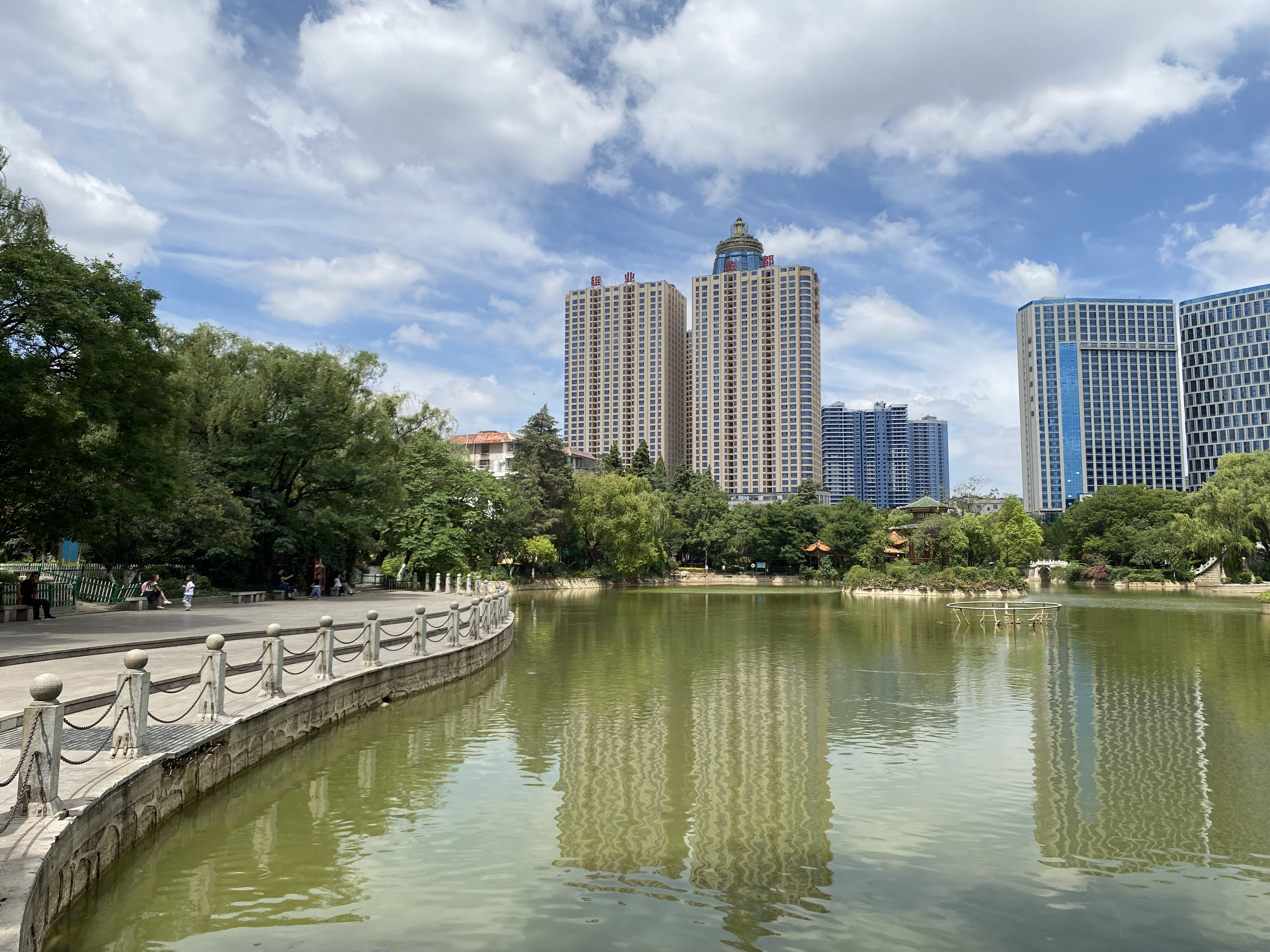
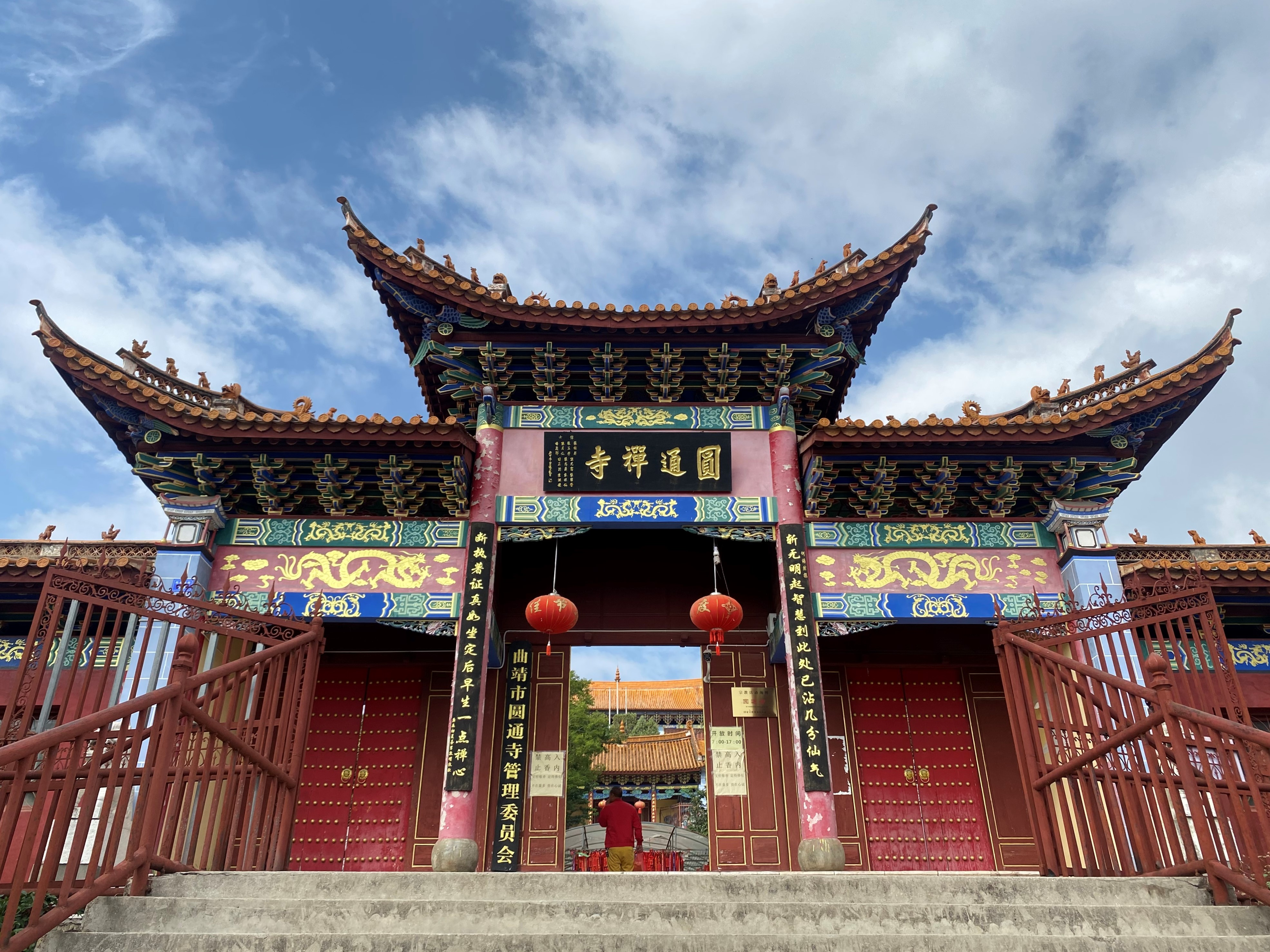
- Urban skyline Liaokuo Park/Jingning Pagoda Zhujiangyuan Square Qilin Park Yuantong Temple

- Location of Qujing in Yunnan
- Coordinates (Qujing municipal government): 25°29′28″N 103°47′46″E
- Country: People's Republic of China
- Province: Yunnan
- Admin HQ: Qilin District

Government
  - Secretary: Li Wenrong
  - Mayor: Dong Baotong

Area
  - Prefecture-level city: 29,855 km^{2} (11,527 sq mi)
  - Urban (2018): 148 km^{2} (57 sq mi)
  - Metro: 1,442 km^{2} (557 sq mi)
- Elevation: 1,873 m (6,145 ft)

Population (2018 estimation)
  - Prefecture-level city: 6,155,400
  - Density: 206.18/km^{2} (533.99/sq mi)
  - Urban: 1,432,500
  - Urban density: 9,680/km^{2} (25,100/sq mi)
  - Metro: 1,432,500
  - Metro density: 993.4/km^{2} (2,573/sq mi)

GDP
  - Prefecture-level city: CN¥ 380.2 billion US$ 56.1 billion
  - Per capita: CN¥ 66,373; US$9,790
- Time zone: UTC+8 (China Standard)
- Postal code: 655000
- Area code: 0874
- ISO 3166 code: CN-YN-03
- License Plate Prefix: 云D
- Website: www.qj.gov.cn

Qujing (Chinese: 曲靖; pinyin: Qūjìng) is a prefecture-level city in the east of Yunnan province, China, bordering Guizhou province to the north and east and the Guangxi Zhuang Autonomous Region to the south; thus, it was called "Key between Yunnan and Guizhou" (滇黔锁钥) and "Throat of Yunnan" (云南咽喉) in the past. It is part of the Central Yunnan Metropolitan Region plan (滇中城市群规划) in effect for 2016–49. Its administrative population is 6,047,000 according to a 2015 estimate, of whom, 1,408,500 reside in the metro area, which contains Qilin District, Zhanyi District and Malong District. The city's resident population at the end of 2024 is 5.634 million. During the 11th National Five-Year Plan period, the government of Qujing planned to develop the city into the "big city at the origin of the Pearl River" (珠江源大城市) in the following decades, including increasing the built-up urban area to past 100 km^{2} (39 sq mi) and the urban population to surpass 1 million by 2020, the second in Yunnan, after Kunming.

== Geography and climate ==
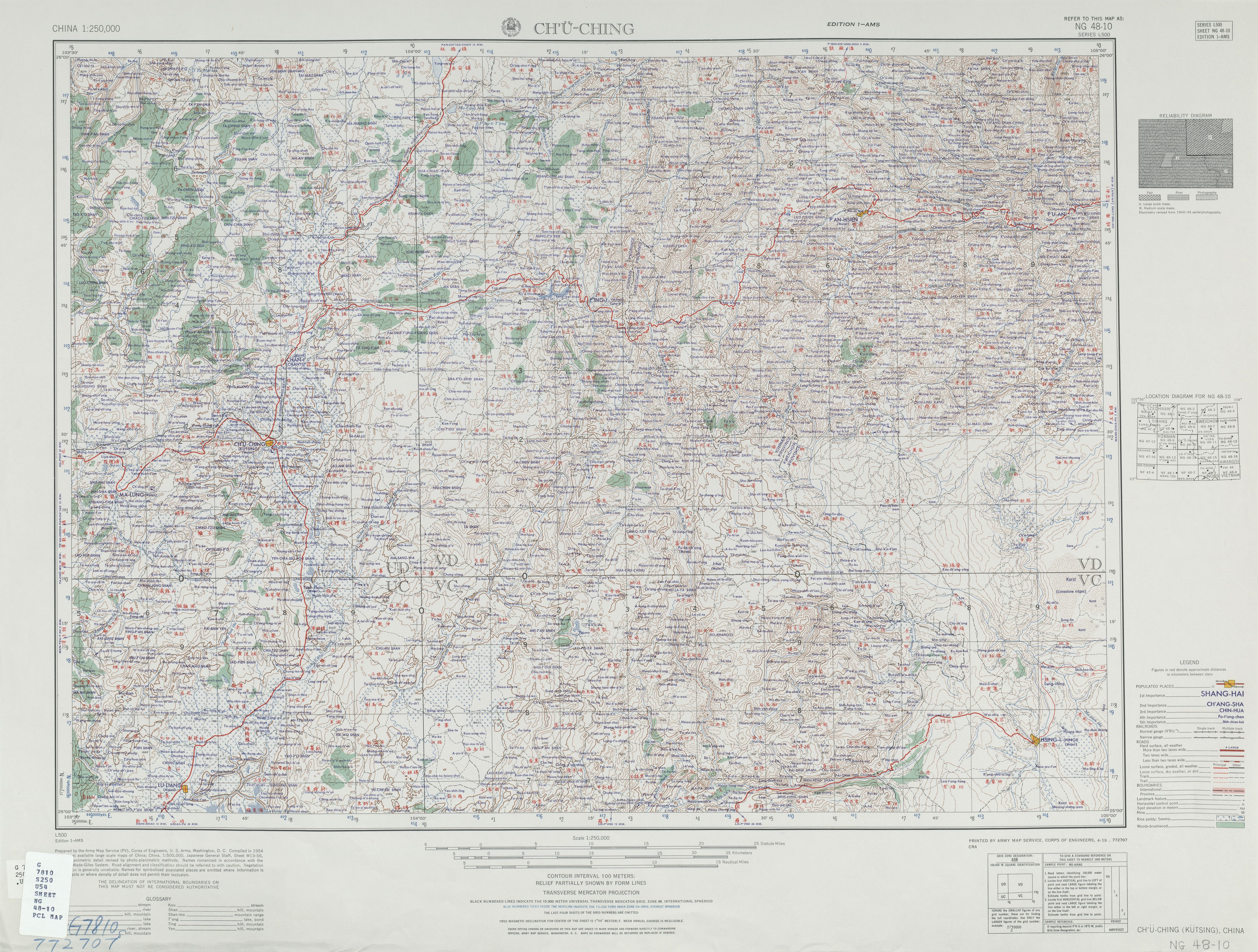
Map including Qujing (labeled as CH'U-CHING (KÜTSING) (Walled) 曲靖) (AMS, 1954)

Qujing is located in the east of Yunnan province, about 130 kilometres (81 mi) east of Kunming, the provincial capital. It borders Kunming to the west, Zhaotong and Bijie to the north, Liupanshui and Qianxinan Buyei and Miao Autonomous Prefecture to the east, and Honghe Hani and Yi Autonomous Prefecture, Wenshan Zhuang and Miao Autonomous Prefecture and Baise to the south. Like much of the central and eastern parts of the province, it is part of the Yunnan–Guizhou Plateau.

Tempered by the low latitude and moderate elevation, Qujing has a mild subtropical highland climate (Köppen Cwb), with short, mild, dry winters, and warm, rainy summers. Frost may occur in winter but the days still generally warm up to around 15 °C (59 °F). During summer, a majority of the days features some rainfall, and daytime temperatures rise to 25 °C (77 °F). A great majority of the year's rainfall occurs from June to October.

Climate data for Qujing, elevation 1,906 m (6,253 ft), (1991–2020 normals, extremes 1971–present)
| Month | Jan | Feb | Mar | Apr | May | Jun | Jul | Aug | Sep | Oct | Nov | Dec | Year |
|---|---|---|---|---|---|---|---|---|---|---|---|---|---|
| Record high °C (°F) | 25.9 (78.6) | 28.8 (83.8) | 29.5 (85.1) | 31.9 (89.4) | 33.4 (92.1) | 32.1 (89.8) | 31.1 (88.0) | 31.5 (88.7) | 30.9 (87.6) | 27.6 (81.7) | 26.1 (79.0) | 24.6 (76.3) | 33.4 (92.1) |
| Mean daily maximum °C (°F) | 15.3 (59.5) | 17.5 (63.5) | 21.6 (70.9) | 24.4 (75.9) | 25.5 (77.9) | 25.4 (77.7) | 25.3 (77.5) | 25.4 (77.7) | 23.6 (74.5) | 20.6 (69.1) | 18.2 (64.8) | 15.0 (59.0) | 21.5 (70.7) |
| Daily mean °C (°F) | 8.6 (47.5) | 10.6 (51.1) | 14.4 (57.9) | 17.5 (63.5) | 19.3 (66.7) | 20.3 (68.5) | 20.5 (68.9) | 20.2 (68.4) | 18.4 (65.1) | 15.5 (59.9) | 12.2 (54.0) | 8.8 (47.8) | 15.5 (59.9) |
| Mean daily minimum °C (°F) | 4.2 (39.6) | 5.8 (42.4) | 9.2 (48.6) | 12.4 (54.3) | 15.0 (59.0) | 17.0 (62.6) | 17.4 (63.3) | 17.0 (62.6) | 15.2 (59.4) | 12.5 (54.5) | 8.3 (46.9) | 4.9 (40.8) | 11.6 (52.8) |
| Record low °C (°F) | −6.7 (19.9) | −9.2 (15.4) | −5.8 (21.6) | 0.3 (32.5) | 3.8 (38.8) | 9.4 (48.9) | 9.0 (48.2) | 8.7 (47.7) | 5.3 (41.5) | 1.1 (34.0) | −3.5 (25.7) | −8.7 (16.3) | −9.2 (15.4) |
| Average precipitation mm (inches) | 26.8 (1.06) | 17.2 (0.68) | 23.8 (0.94) | 35.5 (1.40) | 89.9 (3.54) | 192.2 (7.57) | 172.2 (6.78) | 139.9 (5.51) | 99.7 (3.93) | 86.3 (3.40) | 30.5 (1.20) | 18.3 (0.72) | 932.3 (36.73) |
| Average precipitation days (≥ 0.1 mm) | 6.8 | 6.6 | 6.6 | 8.2 | 12.1 | 17.1 | 17.9 | 16.8 | 13.0 | 13.3 | 6.6 | 6.6 | 131.6 |
| Average snowy days | 2.7 | 1.8 | 0.4 | 0 | 0 | 0 | 0 | 0 | 0 | 0 | 0.2 | 1.1 | 6.2 |
| Average relative humidity (%) | 65 | 58 | 53 | 55 | 63 | 74 | 78 | 76 | 76 | 78 | 71 | 70 | 68 |
| Mean monthly sunshine hours | 179.0 | 196.1 | 236.5 | 236.1 | 197.9 | 133.1 | 130.1 | 148.7 | 126.5 | 127.3 | 165.0 | 158.3 | 2,034.6 |
| Percentage possible sunshine | 54 | 61 | 63 | 61 | 48 | 32 | 31 | 37 | 35 | 36 | 51 | 49 | 47 |
Source 1: China Meteorological Administration
Source 2: Weather China

== Transport ==
Qujing is linked to Kunming by the National Highway 320. Drive time is about three hours. The transportation system in Qujing is well developed. You can access almost every corner of the city by way of the Kun Qu Freeway. Buses to Kunming depart from Qujing Bus Station every half hour, the trip takes about three hours. The bus station also provides transportation to Dali, Honghezhou and other destinations around Qujing. Taxi and buses are available in Qujing. The base rate of a taxi is RMB 7 for the first 2.5 km (1.6 mi).

Two train routes, Guizhou to Kunming and Nanning to Kunming, run through eight towns in Qujing each day. It takes one and a half hours to get from Qujing to Kunming by express. After Shanghai–Kunming high-speed railway completed in December 2016, it takes 45 minutes to reach Kunming South High-speed Train Station and an hour to reach Guiyang North High-speed Train Station from Qujing North High-speed Train Station. There is a plan for a speed train to run between Chengdu and Nanning by the year 2015, which will make the trip from Kunming to Qujing only 30 minutes long.

== Administrative divisions ==
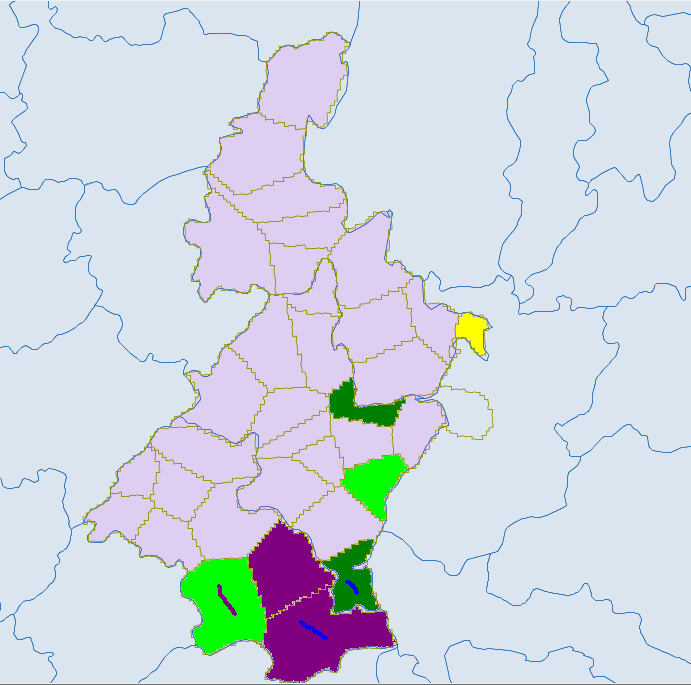
Light green -Yi. Blue – miao. Red – zhuang. Dark green- Bouyei. Yellow- Shui

The government seat is located in Qilin District.

Map
| Name | Hanzi | Hanyu Pinyin | Population (2015) | Area (km^{2}) | Density (/km^{2}) |
|---|---|---|---|---|---|
| Qilin District | 麒麟区 | Qílín Qū | 767,300 | 1,552.92 | 493 |
| Zhanyi District | 沾益区 | Zhānyì Qū | 448,500 | 2,801.27 | 160 |
| Malong District | 马龙区 | Mǎlóng Qū | 192,700 | 1,600.34 | 120 |
| Xuanwei City | 宣威市 | Xuānwēi Shì | 1,352,100 | 6,053.2 | 222 |
| Fuyuan County | 富源县 | Fùyuán Xiàn | 741,700 | 3,235.4 | 229 |
| Luoping County | 罗平县 | Luópíng Xiàn | 405,100 | 3,025.35 | 187 |
| Shizong County | 师宗县 | Shīzōng Xiàn | 405,100 | 2,741.66 | 147 |
| Luliang County | 陆良县 | Lùliáng Xiàn | 638,800 | 2,010.04 | 317 |
| Huize County | 会泽县 | Huìzé Xiàn | 934,800 | 5,883.93 | 159 |

== Economy ==
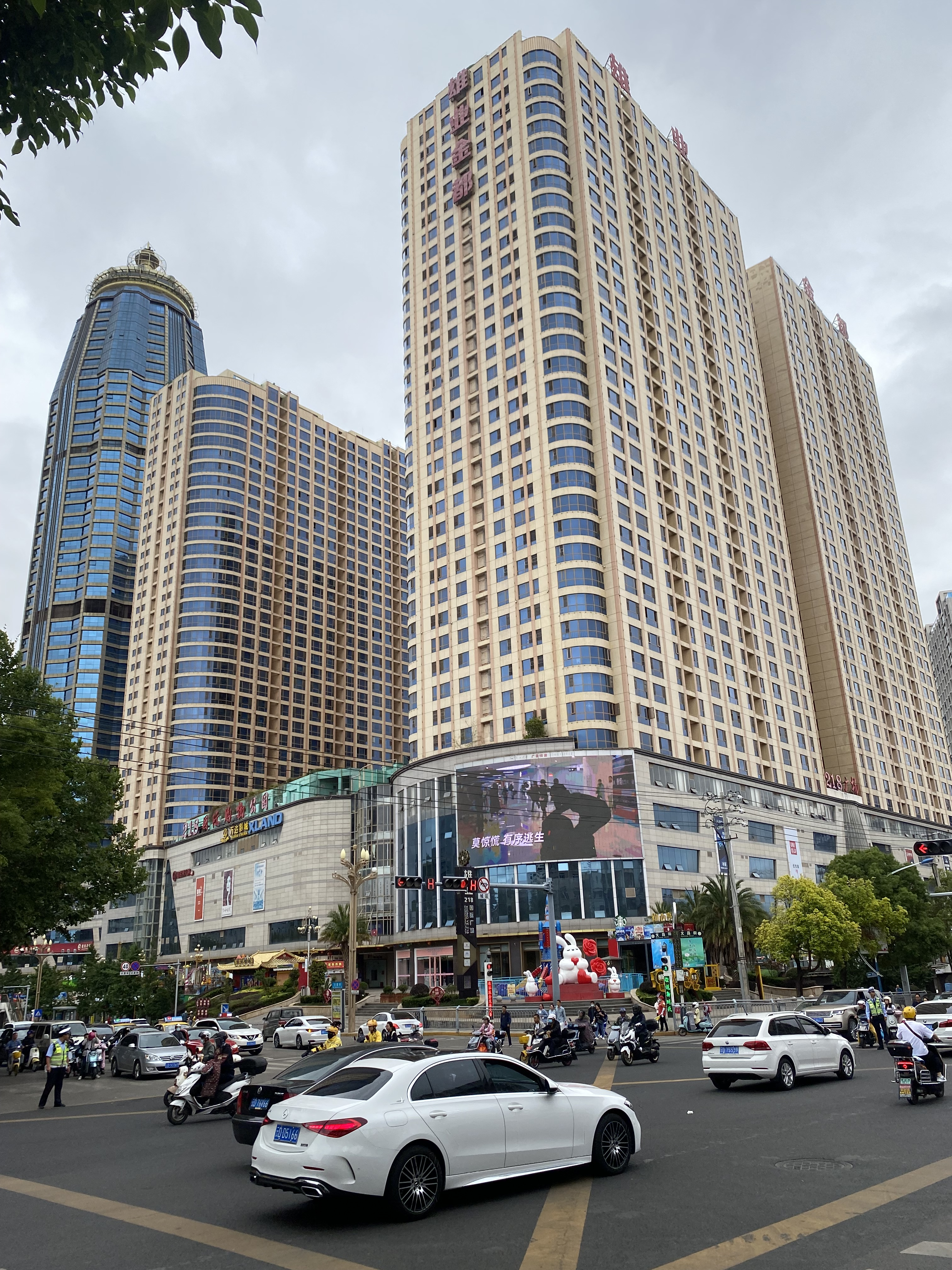
Xiongye 218 Shopping Mall

In 2016, the total GDP was 177.5 billion Yuan, and the GDP per capita was 27044 yuan.

Tobacco, automobiles, power generation and chemical engineering are the main industries in Qujing.

- Qujing Economic and Technological Development Zone

Qujing Economic and Technological Development Zone (QETDZ) is a provincial development zone approved by Yunnan Provincial Government in August 1992. It is located in the east of urban Qujing, the second largest city in Yunnan in terms of economic strengths. The location of the development zone is the economic, political and cultural center of Qujing. As an agency under Qujing municipal Party committee and municipal government, the administrative commission of QETDZ functions as an economy supervising body at the prefecture level and an administration body at the county level. It has 106 km^{2} (41 sq mi) under its jurisdiction. It shoulders the task of building a new 40-square-kilometer city area and providing service for a population of 400,000 in the upcoming 10 years.

=== Demography ===
Among the resident population, the Han population is 5,442,131, accounting for 92.95% of the total population; the ethnic minorities population is 412,924, accounting for 7.1% of the total population.

Ethnic Composition of Qujing City (November 2010)
| National name | Han | Yi | Hui | Hmong | Zhuang | Buyi | Shui | Bai | Yao | Mongol | Others |
|---|---|---|---|---|---|---|---|---|---|---|---|
| Population | 5442014 | 225245 | 68252 | 33518 | 30794 | 29941 | 6710 | 5259 | 2349 | 2169 | 8804 |
| Proportion of total population (%) | 92.95 | 3.85 | 1.17 | 0.57 | 0.53 | 0.51 | 0.11 | 0.09 | 0.04 | 0.04 | 0.15 |
| Proportion of minority population (%) | --- | 54.53 | 16.52 | 8.11 | 7.46 | 7.25 | 1.62 | 1.27 | 0.57 | 0.53 | 2.13 |

== Sites of interest ==
- Jiulong Waterfall (Nine Dragons Waterfall) in Luoping County
- Tiansheng Cave, formerly Xianren Dong (Fairy Cave, although some translate it as Celestial Being Cave)
