= Luliang County =

Luliang County 陆良县
- County
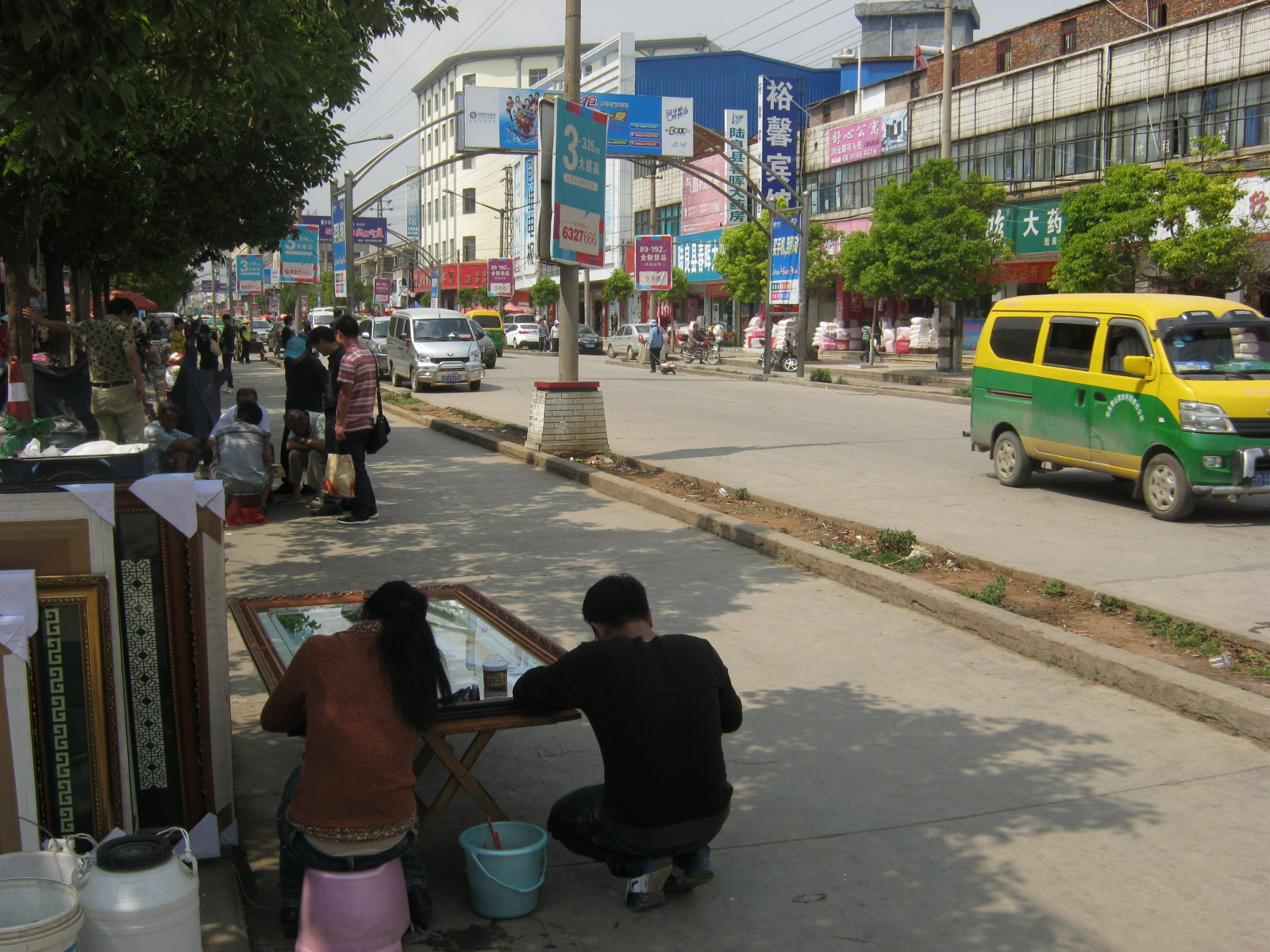
- Luliang in 2013

- Location of Luliang County (red) and Qujing (pink) within Yunnan province

- Location of the seat in Yunnan
- Coordinates: 25°02′53″N 103°44′58″E
- Country: People's Republic of China
- Province: Yunnan
- Prefecture-level city: Qujing

Area
  - Total: 2,096 km^{2} (809 sq mi)

Population
  - Total: 610,000
  - Density: 290/km^{2} (750/sq mi)
- Postal code: 655600
- Area code: 0874
- Website: www.luliang.gov.cn

Luliang County (simplified Chinese: 陆良县; traditional Chinese: 陸良縣; pinyin: Lùliáng Xiàn) is a county under the administration of the prefecture-level city of Qujing, in the east of Yunnan province of southwestern China. It borders Luoping County to the east, Yiliang County, Kunming to the west, Shizong County, Luxi County, Yunnan and Shilin County to the south, and Qilin District and Malong District to the north.

== Administrative divisions ==
Luliang County has 2 subdistricts, 7 towns and 2 townships.

2 subdistricts

- Zhongshu (中枢街道)
- Tongle (同乐街道)

7 towns

- Banqiao (板桥镇)
- Sanchahe (三岔河镇)
- Majie (马街镇)
- Zhaokua (召夸镇)
- Damogu (大莫古镇)
- Fanghua (芳华镇)
- Xiaobaihu (小百户镇)

2 townships

- Huoshui (活水乡)
- Longhai (龙海乡)

== Climate ==
Climate data for Luliang, elevation 1,858 m (6,096 ft), (1991–2020 normals, extremes 1991–present)
Month	Jan	Feb	Mar	Apr	May	Jun	Jul	Aug	Sep	Oct	Nov	Dec	Year
Record high °C (°F)	24.5 (76.1)	27.3 (81.1)	29.3 (84.7)	31.3 (88.3)	33.0 (91.4)	31.9 (89.4)	30.2 (86.4)	30.7 (87.3)	30.4 (86.7)	27.0 (80.6)	26.6 (79.9)	24.0 (75.2)	33.0 (91.4)
Mean daily maximum °C (°F)	15.5 (59.9)	17.9 (64.2)	21.9 (71.4)	24.6 (76.3)	25.4 (77.7)	25.3 (77.5)	24.9 (76.8)	25.0 (77.0)	23.5 (74.3)	20.8 (69.4)	18.3 (64.9)	15.1 (59.2)	21.5 (70.7)
Daily mean °C (°F)	8.1 (46.6)	10.3 (50.5)	14.2 (57.6)	17.4 (63.3)	19.5 (67.1)	20.5 (68.9)	20.3 (68.5)	19.9 (67.8)	18.2 (64.8)	15.6 (60.1)	11.7 (53.1)	8.4 (47.1)	15.3 (59.6)
Mean daily minimum °C (°F)	2.5 (36.5)	4.1 (39.4)	7.7 (45.9)	11.3 (52.3)	14.7 (58.5)	17.0 (62.6)	17.2 (63.0)	16.6 (61.9)	14.8 (58.6)	12.2 (54.0)	7.0 (44.6)	3.5 (38.3)	10.7 (51.3)
Record low °C (°F)	−6.1 (21.0)	−4.2 (24.4)	−1.7 (28.9)	2.6 (36.7)	6.0 (42.8)	8.1 (46.6)	12.4 (54.3)	10.7 (51.3)	5.4 (41.7)	1.9 (35.4)	−3.3 (26.1)	−7.0 (19.4)	−7.0 (19.4)
Average precipitation mm (inches)	25.8 (1.02)	16.7 (0.66)	23.9 (0.94)	31.2 (1.23)	97.3 (3.83)	167.5 (6.59)	174.6 (6.87)	125.1 (4.93)	78.1 (3.07)	70.1 (2.76)	29.6 (1.17)	18.2 (0.72)	858.1 (33.79)
Average precipitation days (≥ 0.1 mm)	6.5	5.9	6.4	7.8	12.0	15.8	18.5	17.8	12.8	12.6	6.4	5.3	127.8
Average snowy days	2.0	1.0	0.3	0	0	0	0	0	0	0	0.1	0.6	4
Average relative humidity (%)	70	63	57	58	65	76	81	81	80	80	76	75	72
Mean monthly sunshine hours	185.5	199.4	234.7	240.4	205.5	137.2	125.2	144.5	124.2	125.5	166.0	161.6	2,049.7
Percentage possible sunshine	55	62	63	63	50	34	30	36	34	35	51	49	47
Source: China Meteorological Administration

== Flora and fauna ==
The type locality of Sinocyclocheilus lateristriatus, a cyprinid fish endemic to China, is in Luliang County. Similarly, Schuchertella luliangensis, a Permian brachiopod, has been described from the Kuangshan Formation in Luliang County (and named after the county).
