= Sichuan University of Science and Engineering =

Public university in Zigong, Sichuan, China

- 四川轻化工大学
- Motto: 厚德达理 励志勤工
- Motto in English: Aspiration together with Diligence, Morality in Conformity with Truth
- Type: Public
- Established: 1965
- President: TUO Xianguo
- Faculty: about 2,000
- Undergraduates: 20,137
- Postgraduates: 1,016
- Location: Zigong, Sichuan, China
- Campus: Urban, 150 ha (1.50 km^{2})
- Colors: GreenWhite
- Website: suse.edu.cn

Chinese name
- Simplified Chinese: 四川轻化工大学
- Traditional Chinese: 四川輕化工大學
Transcriptions
Standard Mandarin
- Hanyu Pinyin: Sìchuān Qīnghuàgōng Dàxué

The Sichuan University of Science and Engineering (SUSE) is a provincial public university in Zigong, Sichuan, China. It is affiliated with the Sichuan Provincial People's Government. The university was originally established in 1965 and incorporated three other colleges to become a comprehensive university in its current form in 2003.

The university traces its origins to the Southwest Branch of the East China Institute of Chemical Technology, established in Zigong in 1965 as part of China's Third Front industrial and educational development program. After the branch was discontinued in 1979, its site became the basis of the provincially administered Sichuan Chemical Technology College. The institution was renamed the Sichuan Light Industry and Chemical Technology College in 1983. In 2003, it merged with three other colleges in Zigong to establish the current institution.

SUSE has traditionally specialized in chemical engineering, light industry, materials, mechanical and control engineering, and food and fermentation science. Its location in Zigong and Yibin has also led to teaching and research associated with the regional salt, chemical, fluorine-materials, and baijiu industries.

== History ==
=== Third Front origins ===
The institutional origins of SUSE are connected with the Third Front, a national program begun in the 1960s to relocate and develop strategically important industry, research, and higher education in China's interior. On 8 March 1965, the Ministry of Higher Education approved a proposal by the East China Institute of Chemical Technology (华东化工学院; now the East China University of Science and Technology) to establish a southwest branch in Zigong. For security purposes, construction of the branch was designated Project 652 (652工程).

A Project 652 construction office was formally organized on 20 May 1965. The branch was built near Huangling in the Zigong area. Construction and institutional development were interrupted between 1967 and 1971 during the Cultural Revolution. After the parent institution was renamed the Shanghai Institute of Chemical Technology in 1972, the branch became known as the Sichuan Branch of the Shanghai Institute of Chemical Technology (上海化工学院四川分院). Teaching resumed, and the branch began admitting worker-peasant-soldier students in 1973. It admitted students through the restored Gaokao from 1977.

In 1979, the national government decided to discontinue the Sichuan branch. Students who remained enrolled through the Shanghai institution were transferred back to the parent campus. The facilities in Zigong were transferred to Sichuan provincial administration and became the basis for a new institution, the Sichuan Chemical Technology College (四川化工学院).

=== Development as a provincial institution ===
The Sichuan Chemical Technology College was placed under the leadership of Sichuan Province. In 1983, it was renamed the Sichuan Light Industry and Chemical Technology College (四川轻化工学院). The institution retained chemical engineering as a principal field while expanding into areas including food and fermentation engineering, machinery, automation, materials, electronics, management, and the basic sciences.

On 16 April 2003, the Sichuan Light Industry and Chemical Technology College, Zigong Teachers Higher Vocational College (自贡师范高等专科学校), Zigong College (自贡高等专科学校), and Zigong Education College (自贡教育学院) were consolidated to establish the Sichuan University of Science and Engineering (四川理工学院; lit. 'Sichuan Science and Engineering College'). The expanded institution also received authorization to award master's degrees.

=== Expansion and university status ===
During the 2010s, SUSE expanded beyond Zigong. In 2017, its Yibin Campus became the first university campus to enter the newly developed Yibin University City. According to Xinhua News Agency, the first phase was constructed in slightly more than six months. The university established the China Baijiu College in the same year.

In 2018, the Ministry of Education granted the institution university status and approved the corresponding Chinese-language renaming. The ministry classified the reconstituted university as a multidisciplinary undergraduate institution administered by Sichuan Province. Although the Chinese name changed, the institution continued to use the Sichuan University of Science and Engineering as its official English name. The Libaihe Campus in Zigong opened in March 2021.

== Campuses ==
As of 2026, the Sichuan University of Science and Engineering operates three teaching campuses, Libaihe, Huidong, and Yibin, as well as one practical-activity campus, Huangling. The first, second, and fourth are in Zigong, while Yibin Campus is in neighboring Yibin. Together, the campuses occupy nearly 5,000 mu (approximately 333 hectares), with about 1.75 million square metres of buildings.

Libaihe Campus (李白河校区) is in Da'an, Zigong. It opened in March 2021 as a major new campus of the university. Its address is 100 Yongtian Road. The campus accommodates teaching, research, administration, student residences, and other university facilities.

Huidong Campus (汇东校区) is in Ziliujing, Zigong, at 519 Huixing Road. It remains one of the university's principal teaching campuses and accommodates academic schools, laboratories, student services, and residential facilities.

Yibin Campus (宜宾校区) is at 1 Baita Road in Sanjiang New Area, Yibin. Its development began as part of the municipal government's construction of Yibin University City and Science and Technology Innovation City. It was the first university campus to enter the new higher-education district in 2017. The campus has particular links with teaching and research in food science, brewing, materials, and other fields related to industries in southern Sichuan. The China Baijiu College was established at the university in 2017 as Yibin expanded cooperation between higher education and its major baijiu industry.

Huangling Campus (黄岭校区) is in Dengguan Town, Yantan, Zigong. The site is associated with the original Project 652 branch established in the 1960s and therefore represents the oldest part of the university's physical institutional history. As of 2026, the university classifies Huangling as a practical-activity campus rather than one of its three regular teaching campuses.

== Academics ==
The Sichuan University of Science and Engineering is a multidisciplinary institution with bachelor's- and master's-degree awarding authority. As of March 2026, the university reported nearly 36,000 students, approximately 3,000 employees, and nearly 2,300 full-time teaching staff. It reported 23 colleges and 79 undergraduate admissions programs, including five Sino-foreign cooperative education programs.

The university groups its disciplinary development into six broad clusters: materials and chemical engineering; food and light industry; mechanical engineering and control; mathematics, physical sciences, and information technology; economics, management, and law; and the humanities, arts, and physical education. Chemical technology, pattern recognition and intelligent systems, and fermentation engineering are designated provincial key disciplines in Sichuan.

Its current academic directory includes schools and colleges in the following fields:

- Mathematics and statistics
- Physics and electronic engineering
- Chemistry and environmental engineering
- Mechanical engineering
- Materials science and engineering
- Automation and information engineering
- Computer science and engineering
- Civil engineering
- Chemical engineering
- Food and brewing engineering
- Fire and safety engineering
- Medicine
- Economics
- Law
- Marxism
- Education and psychological sciences
- Physical education
- Humanities
- Foreign languages
- Management
- Music
- Fine arts

The university also maintains specialized and interdisciplinary units, including a School of Excellent Engineers and industry-oriented colleges concerned with regional economic and cultural sectors.

=== Industry-oriented education ===
The university cooperates with the China Alcoholic Drinks Association and Wuliangye in the China Baijiu College, with industrial partners in a fluorine-materials college, and with the China Arts and Crafts Society and other organizations in the China Lantern College. These programs reflect major industries associated with Zigong and Yibin, particularly chemicals, salt, baijiu production, and the Zigong lantern industry.

The China Baijiu College was founded in 2017. Its establishment coincided with the opening of the Yibin Campus and formed part of cooperation between the university and the local brewing industry.

The university also operates an Excellent Engineers program focused on areas including energy and chemical engineering, advanced materials, solid-state fermentation, and process equipment.

=== International education ===
SUSE maintains academic partnerships with universities and educational institutions outside China. Its cooperative degree programs include arrangements with the University of Saint Francis, a private Catholic university in Fort Wayne, Indiana, United States.

In December 2025, the Ministry of Education approved Chester College, a Sino-foreign cooperative educational institution jointly operated by SUSE and the public University of Chester in England, United Kingdom. The college offers undergraduate programs including electrical engineering, mechanical design and manufacturing and automation, computer science and technology, and chemical engineering and technology.

== Research ==
Research at the Sichuan University of Science and Engineering is concentrated particularly in chemical and functional materials, food and fermentation science, automation and control, corrosion protection, environmental engineering, and regional cultural studies.

In 2021, the Ministry of Science and Technology and the Ministry of Education recognized the Sichuan University of Science and Engineering National University Science Park (四川轻化工大学国家大学科技园) as part of the eleventh group of national university science parks. The science park had initially been developed in 2014 and had received provincial recognition in 2016.

Other research infrastructure reported by the university includes the National High-Performance Fluorine Materials Innovation Center and provincial or ministerial laboratories and research centers for brewing science and technology, intelligent sensing and control, materials corrosion and protection, high-salinity wastewater treatment and resource recovery, and radiation inspection. Humanities and social-science research facilities include the China Salt Culture Research Center and a Sichuan liquor-development research center.

The university's research profile is closely connected to industries in southern Sichuan. Zigong has a long history of salt production and chemical manufacturing, while Yibin is one of China's major centers of baijiu production. University–industry projects consequently include research in fluorine-containing materials, corrosion and pipeline protection, brewing microorganisms and fermentation, chemical processes, and wastewater treatment.

== Rankings ==
In the 2026 ShanghaiRanking Best Chinese Universities Ranking, the Sichuan University of Science and Engineering was ranked 326th in China.

The 2025 Times Higher Education World University Rankings placed the university in the 1501+ band worldwide. In its 2025 subject tables, the university was placed in the 1001–1250 band for engineering and in the 1001+ band for computer science and physical sciences.
