= Luo Qi =

Luo Qi may refer to:

- Luo Qi (engineer) (born 1967), Chinese engineer
- Luo Qi (singer) (born 1975), Chinese singer
