= Zigong =

Zigong 自贡市 Tzu-kung, Tzu-liu-ching
- Prefecture-level city
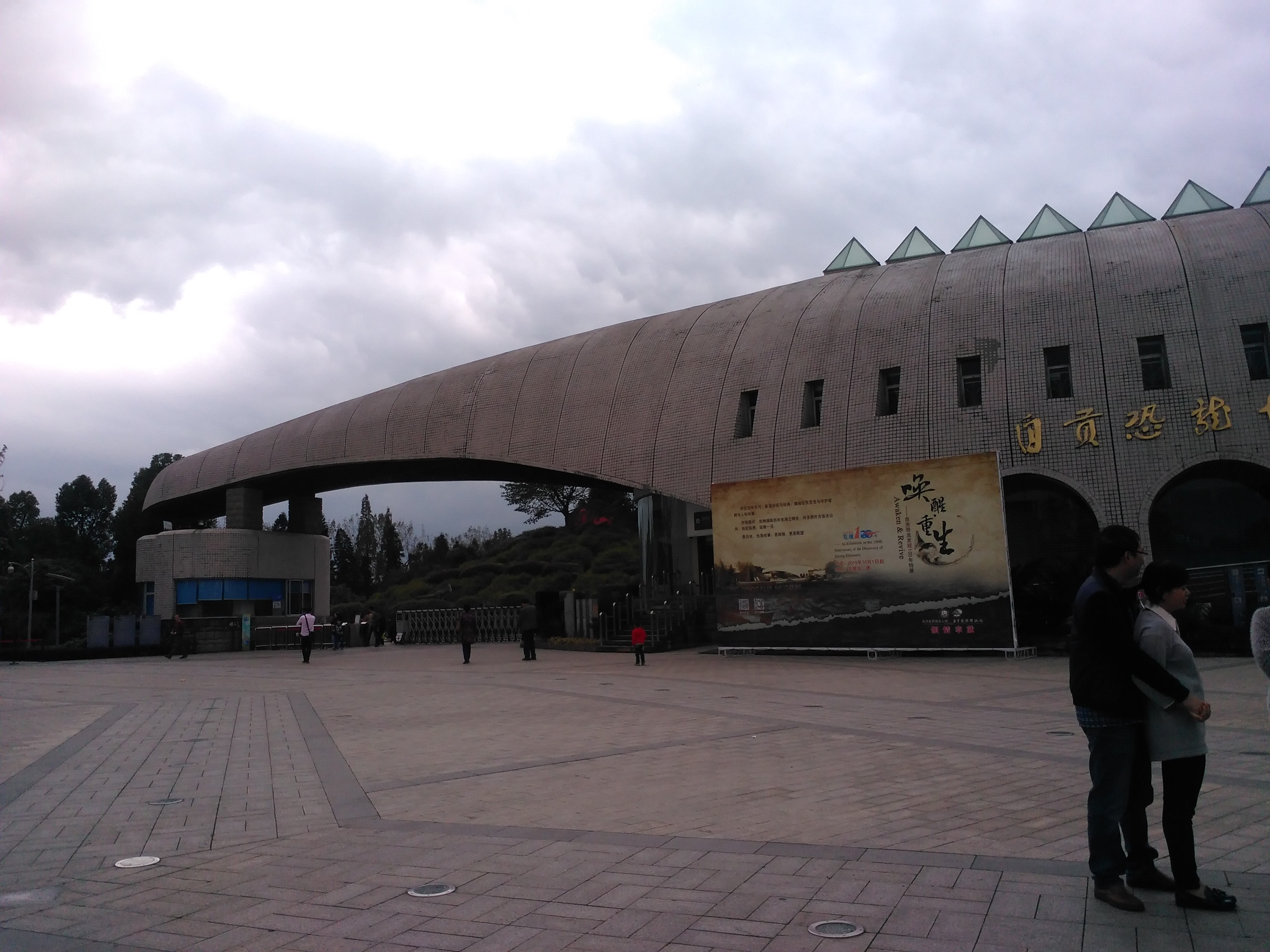
- Zigong Dinosaur Museum
- Interactive map of Zigong
- Coordinates (Zigong municipal government): 29°20′20″N 104°46′44″E
- Country: People's Republic of China
- Province: Sichuan
- Municipal seat: Ziliujing District

Government

Area
  - Prefecture-level city: 4,372.6 km^{2} (1,688.3 sq mi)
  - Urban: 1,441 km^{2} (556 sq mi)
  - Metro: 1,441 km^{2} (556 sq mi)

Population (2020 census)
  - Prefecture-level city: 2,489,256
  - Density: 569.29/km^{2} (1,474.4/sq mi)
  - Urban: 1,297,695
  - Urban density: 900.6/km^{2} (2,332/sq mi)
  - Metro: 1,297,695
  - Metro density: 900.6/km^{2} (2,332/sq mi)

GDP
  - Prefecture-level city: CN¥ 114.3 billion US$ 18.4 billion
  - Per capita: CN¥ 41,447; US$ 6,655
- Time zone: UTC+8 (China Standard)
- ISO 3166 code: CN-SC-03
- Website: www.zg.gov.cn

Chinese name
- Simplified Chinese: 自贡
- Traditional Chinese: 自貢
- Postal: Tzukung
Transcriptions
Standard Mandarin
- Hanyu Pinyin: Zìgòng
- Wade–Giles: Tzu^{4}-kung^{4}
- IPA: [tsî.kʊ̂ŋ]

Zigong (Chinese: 自贡, tsih-kung), formed by the merger of the two former towns of Ziliujing (Tzuliuching, literally "self-flow well") and Gongjing (Kungching, literally "offering well"), is a prefecture-level city in Sichuan, Southwestern China.

== Demographics ==
According to the 2020 Chinese census, the prefecture-level city of Zigong has a population of 2,489,256 inhabitants, less than its population in 2010 (the average annual population growth for the period 2010–2020 was of -0.73%). However, the built-up (or metro) area, consisting of the 4 urban districts, grew, with 1,297,695 inhabitants (1,262,064 in 2010). At the end of 2023 and the beginning of 2024, the resident population is 2.429 million, the urbanization rate is 57.69%, the urban population is 1,401,300, and the rural population is 1,027,700.

== History ==
The area of Zigong has a long history in ancient China - with the invention and development of "Percussion Drilling rig" being one of the city's accomplishments. Zigong is famous for its abundant production of well salt and is known as the "Salt Capital". The production of well salt in the Zigong area originated in the Eastern Han Dynasty, was famous in the Tang and Song Dynasties, and flourished in the late Qing Dynasty and early Republic of China. There are essentially two cities - that of the old and the new. The city was reached by rail in the 1950s. Several four-lane highways reach the city from other cities in the Sichuan province. The new city of Zigong has been modernizing since the late 1970s - but more rapidly since the early 1990s. The old "Salt" city is based on industry and farmland and a new "Tourism" city which caters primarily to Chinese tourists (as Zigong is better known within mainland China). Zigong is host to the Sichuan University of Science and Engineering as well as a new High Technology Zone.

== Economy ==
Salt was once one of the major sources of revenue for China. To give an idea of how much money was generated from salt in China - after the fall of the last emperor, the Republic of China under Sun Yat-sen secured loans based upon the revenues of the Chinese Salt Administration (the government agency in charge of taxation on salt). The chief inspector of that administration stated "The best salt in China is produced from the salt wells of Sichuan". The best salt wells in Sichuan are in Ziliujing District, Zigong.

The people of Zigong have been drilling in the area for Salt since before the Han Dynasty (76-88 A.D.) to extract salt from brine. Some historian estimates are that China has been active in producing salt since about 6000 BC. The brine aquifers in the area have salinity of at least 50 grams per liter. The classical method of drilling and production was the following: a drilling rig is erected and a borehole is drilled using a drilling bit and rope. Brine is extracted by dropping a long tube down the borehole. A membrane valve then captures the brine for retrieval on the surface. Once the brine is retrieved it's then piped to flat pans for boiling. In the boiling process some water and crushed yellow soybean is added. The soybean absorbs the impurities in the salt. Once boiled, a yellow layer is formed - this is scraped off leaving absolutely pure salt. The salt is a medium grain salt with different size flakes which have a very strong and unique salt taste. This salt has no additives so it does clump. Locals use grains of rice in the salt to keep the salt from clumping.

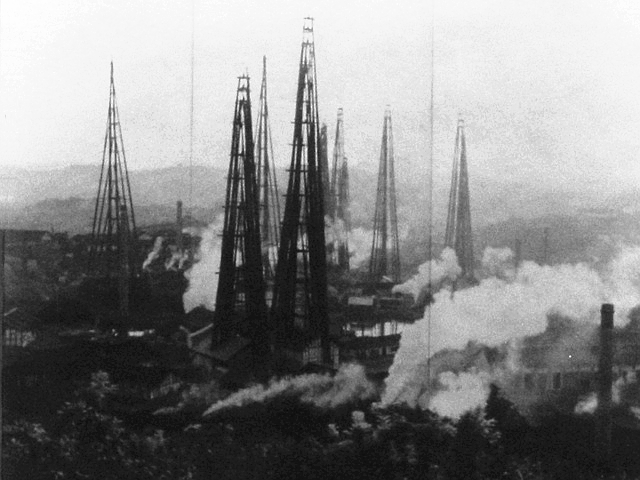
Old Salt Wells in Zigong

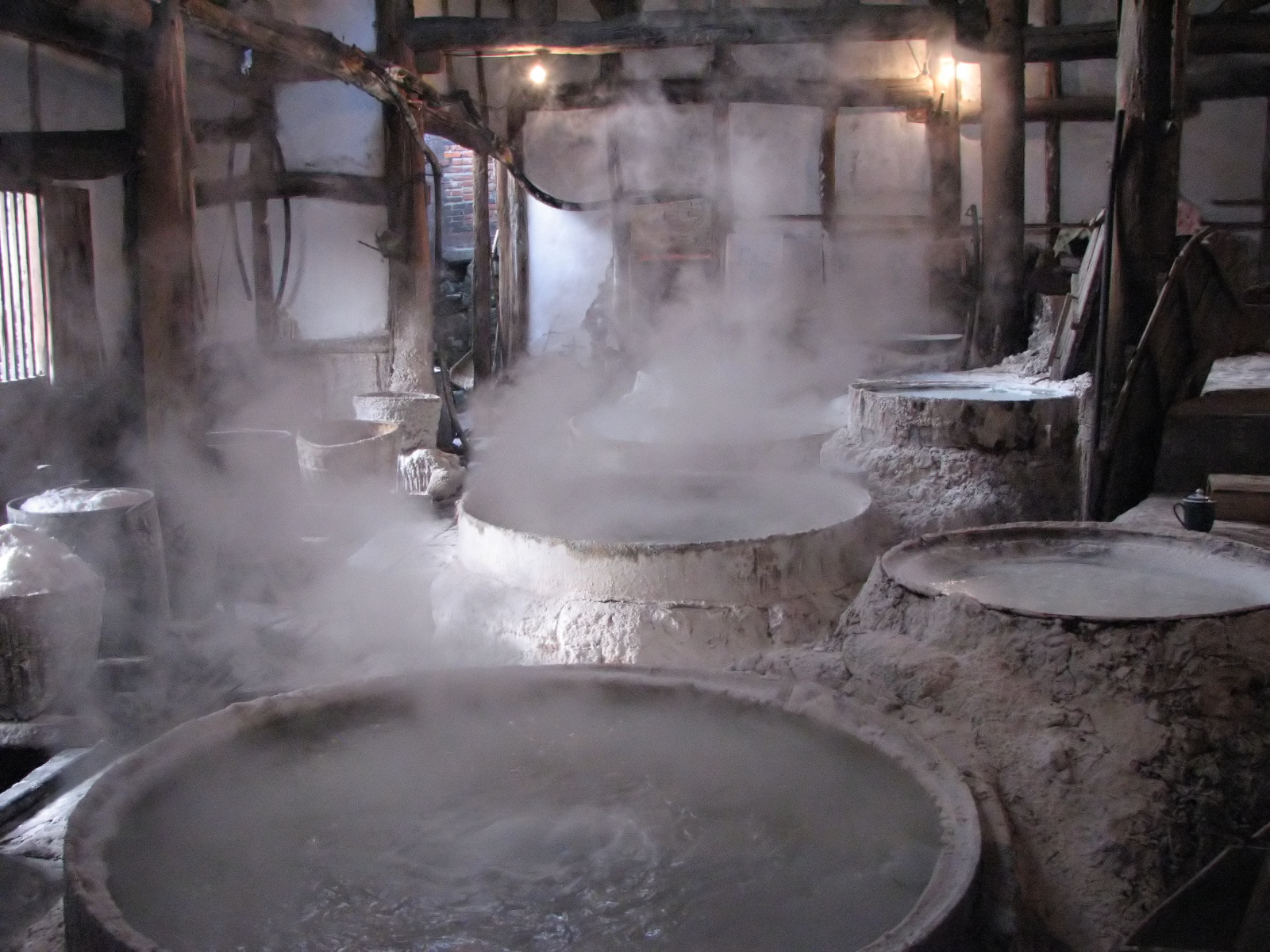
Boiling Brine into Pure Salt

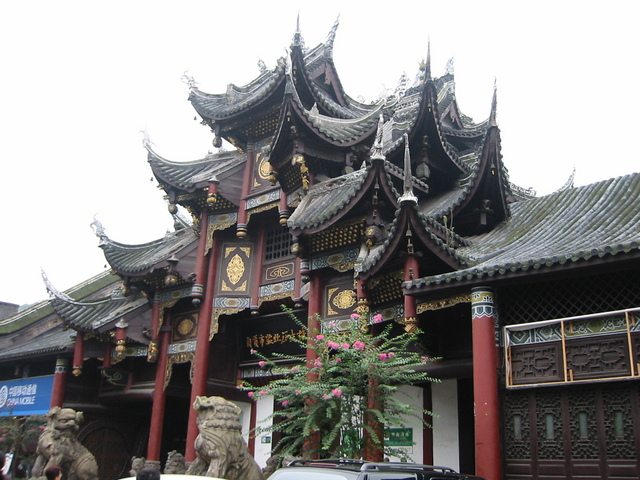
Zigong Salt Museum

Early methods of brine salt production involved digging large pits in the earth (other parts of China used the evaporation method). Later methods involved very innovative drilling and retrieval methods. An unexpected byproduct of the drilling and resulting wells was natural gas. Since natural gas didn't have the uses it does today, it was channeled into pipes and primarily used onsite to boil the brine and extract the salt. The salt Zigong produced was very rich in taste and was served to the Emperor of China as a tribute. The people of Zigong believe its taste to be superior to the popular French sea salts such as fleur de sel.

Salt production via boreholes was once prevalent in the entire Sichuan area - but for several factors (war, rebellion, taxes, wells drying up) Zigong became the center of production. Salt wells in Zigong were deeper and had better brine salinity - making for better yields in the salt extraction process. The method in which boreholes were drilled is significant. In 1835, the world's (at that time) deepest well was drilled reaching 3,300 feet. The miners of Zigong refined the techniques of deep borehole drilling. Later, Europeans copied and further refined the percussion drilling methods - so its effects can be seen in the modern drilling rig used for oil and water.

Salt became an engine of commerce and wealth for Zigong. There were cheaper methods for salt production, as to start a borehole well cost 3,000 pieces of silver, but transportation cost into the Sichuan valley negated the cheaper production methods (as they usually involved sea water). Zigong is located in the central Chinese Sichuan province, which was a large basin, surrounded by mountains on three sides and therefore somewhat isolated. Before refrigeration was available salt was a key chemical used in preserving vegetables, meat, and fish. Because of the factors mentioned above (war, wells drying up, and a rebellion) Zigong became a significant supplier of salt to the Sichuan province up until the 1930s. In 1892, miners discovered a vein of rocksalt that feeds Zigong's aquifers. In 1946, a well was drilled with a rotary drillbit. Ancient percussion drilling methods became obsolete and most of the drilling rigs were torn down due to decay. Today, only one traditional salt well still exists, the Shenhai Well, as a tribute to the workers and industry. The Shenhai Well (Bore depth: 1,001.4 meters/4,400 feet) still operates using the older manual methods of pumping and boiling. The salt is used for pickling or canning - and makes an important ingredient to Sichuan style pickles (which are a local favorite). Today, Zigong is a primary source for natural gas, coal, and inorganic chemical production in addition to salt.

== Administrative divisions ==
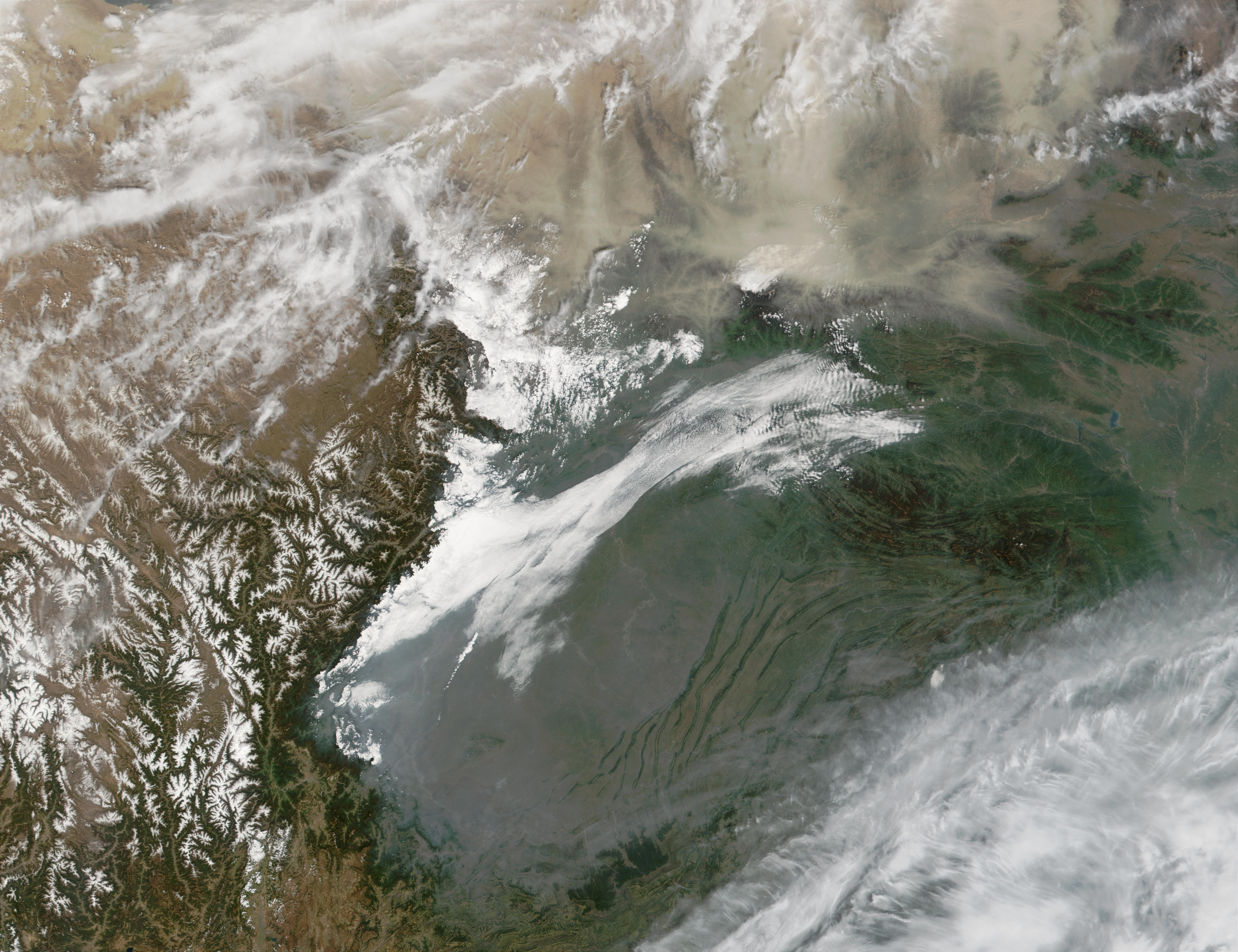
Sichuan Basin Satellite View

Although the region has rich history into antiquity, the prefecture-level city called "Zigong" is a modern name. In 1939, two older cities were combined to make Zigong - Ziliujing (some have romanized this name as "Tzeliutsing") and Gongjing to be named Zigong. The Zigong name is a combination of both older cities' names.

Today there are four municipal districts and two counties of the Zigong Prefecture. The information here presented uses the metric system and data from 2010 Census.

Map
#	English name	Simplified	Traditional	Pinyin	Area	Residential Population (2018 data)	Postal Code
1	Ziliujing District	自流井区	自流井區	Zìliújǐng Qū	153	506,000	643000
2	Da'an District	大安区	大安區	Dà'ān Qū	400	430,000	643000
3	Gongjing District	贡井区	貢井區	Gòngjǐng Qū	418	292,000	643000
4	Yantan District	沿滩区	沿灘區	Yántān Qū	469	388,000	643000
5	Rong County	荣县	榮縣	Róng Xiàn	1,598	540,000	643100
6	Fushun County	富顺县	富順縣	Fùshùn Xiàn	1,333	764,000	643200

Both previous cities - Gongjing and Ziliujing made up what had become one of the busiest saltworks (or saltyards as they are called locally) in China - the Furong Saltyard. The main products were a unique salt called "hua" salt - which surpassed salt from the other Sichuan producers and "ba" salt which became popular in other provinces in China.

== Geography ==
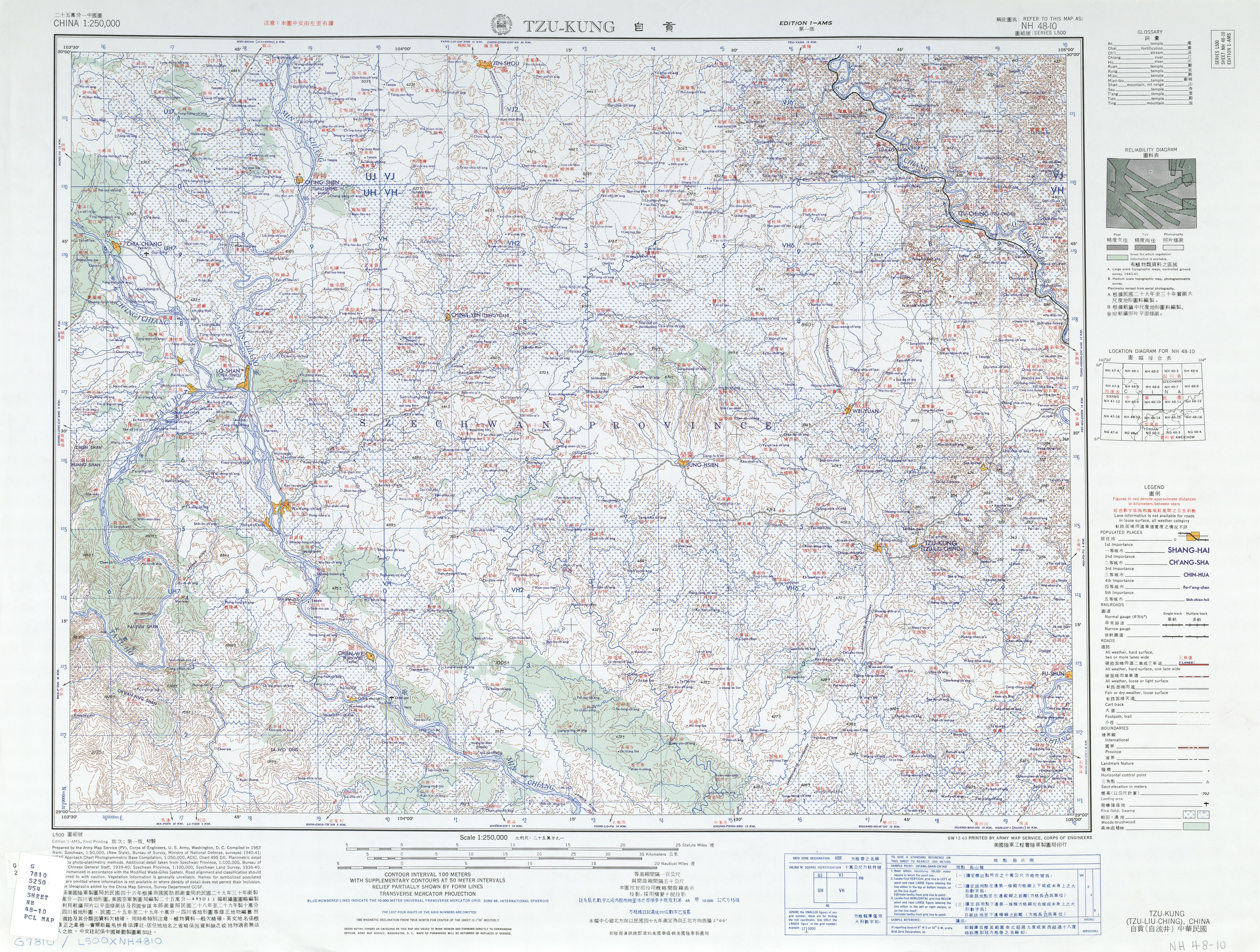
Map including Zigong (labeled as TZU-KUNG (TZU-LIU-CHING) 自貢 (自流井)) (AMS, 1957)

Zigong is located in the Sichuan Basin, and has an area extension of 4,372.6 km^{2} (1,688.3 sq mi). Granted the recognition as one of the Historical and Cultural Cities of China by the State Council of the People's Republic of China. Zigong has long been renowned as "Salt City" for its brine extraction techniques and the attendant salt-related culture. In ancient China, salt was regarded as the energy for body and valued higher even than gold. Therefore, salt trading was always the most profitable business and salt merchants were the wealthiest people. Hence, Zigong had always been one of the richest cities in China until the founding of the People's Republic of China with the introduction of new salt producing methods and advancing of technologies. It has had what is now the Zigong Salt Museum since 1736.

The Fuxi River, a tributary to the Tuo River, snakes through the city's core. The area is very humid and the visibility can be reduced dramatically in the area due to ground fog. The humidity and fog of Zigong can be attributed to that it sits on what was once a vast inland sea. Changes in the environment caused the water levels to subside leaving salt, brine, and natural gas.

Zigong is situated south of the Sichuan basin hill country. To the east of Zigong is Luzhou and to the west of Zigong is Leshan. To Zigong's south is Yibin and to the north-east is the city of Neijiang.

=== Climate ===
Climate data for Zigong, elevation 353 m (1,158 ft), (1991–2020 normals, extremes 1981–present)
Month	Jan	Feb	Mar	Apr	May	Jun	Jul	Aug	Sep	Oct	Nov	Dec	Year
Record high °C (°F)	19.3 (66.7)	24.0 (75.2)	32.1 (89.8)	35.7 (96.3)	37.6 (99.7)	37.6 (99.7)	41.4 (106.5)	43.4 (110.1)	38.7 (101.7)	32.5 (90.5)	26.3 (79.3)	18.8 (65.8)	43.4 (110.1)
Mean daily maximum °C (°F)	10.3 (50.5)	13.4 (56.1)	18.5 (65.3)	24.0 (75.2)	27.5 (81.5)	29.1 (84.4)	31.8 (89.2)	31.9 (89.4)	27.0 (80.6)	21.5 (70.7)	17.1 (62.8)	11.5 (52.7)	22.0 (71.5)
Daily mean °C (°F)	7.7 (45.9)	10.3 (50.5)	14.4 (57.9)	19.4 (66.9)	22.9 (73.2)	25.0 (77.0)	27.4 (81.3)	27.3 (81.1)	23.3 (73.9)	18.4 (65.1)	14.2 (57.6)	9.1 (48.4)	18.3 (64.9)
Mean daily minimum °C (°F)	5.8 (42.4)	8.0 (46.4)	11.6 (52.9)	16.0 (60.8)	19.4 (66.9)	22.0 (71.6)	24.2 (75.6)	24.0 (75.2)	20.7 (69.3)	16.4 (61.5)	12.2 (54.0)	7.4 (45.3)	15.6 (60.2)
Record low °C (°F)	−1.2 (29.8)	0.4 (32.7)	0.8 (33.4)	6.6 (43.9)	10.4 (50.7)	15.3 (59.5)	18.5 (65.3)	17.6 (63.7)	14.4 (57.9)	5.5 (41.9)	2.5 (36.5)	−1.8 (28.8)	−1.8 (28.8)
Average precipitation mm (inches)	13.4 (0.53)	16.3 (0.64)	32.7 (1.29)	64.8 (2.55)	81.5 (3.21)	176.7 (6.96)	190.8 (7.51)	178.7 (7.04)	110.6 (4.35)	57.3 (2.26)	25.0 (0.98)	14.0 (0.55)	961.8 (37.87)
Average precipitation days (≥ 0.1 mm)	9.0	8.4	10.6	12.1	13.7	16.5	13.8	12.6	15.0	15.7	9.0	9.1	145.5
Average snowy days	0.3	0	0	0	0	0	0	0	0	0	0	0.1	0.4
Average relative humidity (%)	81	77	73	71	71	79	79	78	82	84	82	82	78
Mean monthly sunshine hours	32.5	49.3	93.1	125.0	124.5	99.2	133.0	143.9	79.8	48.4	44.6	28.9	1,002.2
Percentage possible sunshine	10	16	25	32	29	24	31	36	22	14	14	9	22
Source: China Meteorological Administration all-time extreme temperatureall-time July high

== Attractions ==
=== Zigong Dinosaur Museum ===
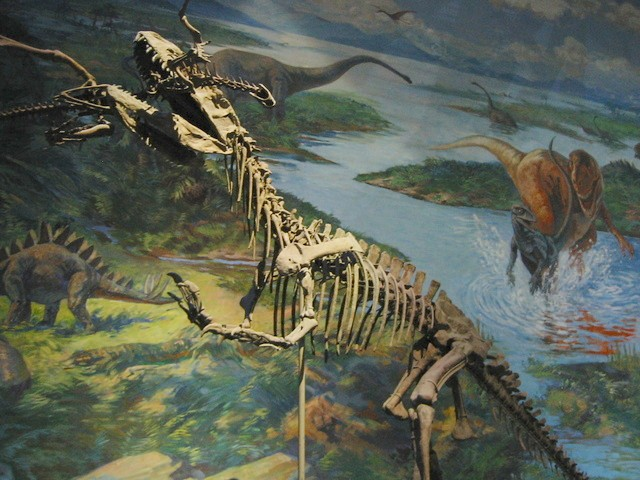
Sinraptor at the Zigong Dinosaur Museum

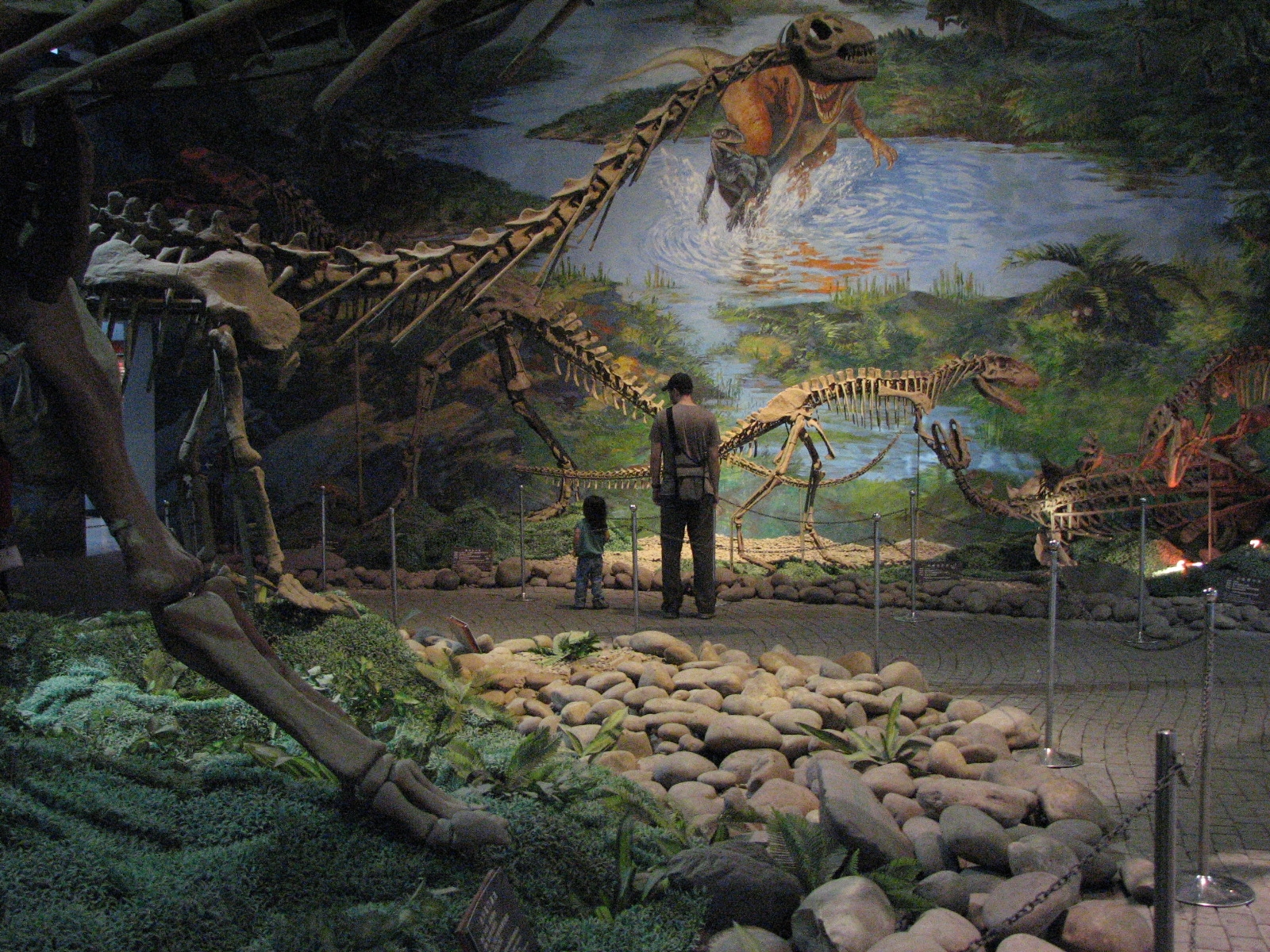
A display at the museum

In the 1980s, vast dinosaur fossils were excavated in the Shaximiao Formation, near the town of Dashanpu 7 km (4.3 mi) north-east from downtown Zigong, including a dinosaur named after the township, Dashanpusaurus. Because of the unique and intact bone remains, Zigong has ever since been attracting paleontologists and dinosaur enthusiasts from around the world. In 1987, the Zigong Dinosaur Museum (自贡恐龙博物馆) was established, becoming the first specialized dinosaur museum open in Asia. Mounted specimens include Omeisaurus, Gigantspinosaurus, Yangchuanosaurus hepingensis, Huayangosaurus and Xiaosaurus.

=== Lantern Festival ===
Zigong is the originator of the Chinese Lantern Festival - which has been copied in Beijing, Hong Kong, and Shanghai. As one of the Historical and Cultural Cities of China, Zigong is called "Lantern Town in the South Kingdom". In recent years, although the annual lantern show forces the local residents to endure unpredictable and extended blackouts during China's Spring Festival, the lantern festival is a boon for tourism in the remote but tranquil city and generates large revenues for the local government. The pattern of Lantern Show, a paradigm of China's festival economy, has been copied throughout China, which dilutes the uniqueness of Zigong's original version. As a measure to promote the city, the lantern show has already been brought to many cities in mainland China and even southeast Asia throughout of the years.

Because China used a lunar calendar or Chinese calendar, the date of the Spring Festival, also known as Chinese New Year changes each year on the Gregorian calendar. It typically falls between January 16 and February 19, depending the cycle of the Twelve earthly branches.

The Lantern Festival has been going on since the Tang dynasty and gets more elaborate each year.

=== Zigong Teahouse ===
Now a historic teahouse built by the Sichuan-based salt merchants originally served as a guild hall for salt merchants. Originally called the Wang Sanwei Lineage Hall - it's now called the Wangye Miao Teahouse. The Wangye Miao Teahouse was popular during the height of the salt trade and still stands along a bend in the Fuxi River - which runs through the center of Zigong. The structure has classic Chinese architecture and still operates today. The teahouse is located next to the river, on Binjiang Lu street. The teahouse is in fact part of the Zigong Salt Museum and is used to generate funds for the museum. However, the original purpose of the teahouse was the assembly hall for shipping merchants and was called Wangye Miao Temple. For its origin please refer to "Merchants Assembly Halls" below.

=== The Ancient Streets ===
Along the Fuxi river are several stone paved roads that are called the "ancient streets". This section of Zigong has traditional houses and shops, typical of life in the days that Zigong was a bustling Salt trade center. Several salt well heads are capped and marked along the streets that wind along the river. At the end of the street is a hand rowed ferry boat that takes a visitor to the opposite shore where stone steps led up into the city.

== Notable people ==
Since the first century, thousands of pre-eminent people have been calling Zigong home. Among them the most famous individuals are Wu Yuzhang, Gao Min, Liu Guangdi, and Jiang Zhujun. Li Zongwu (1879–1943), founder of Thick Black Theory, was also from Ziliujing.

Indeed, in 1993, Zigong officials began to seize more than 2,500 acres of farm land, on which 30,000 farmers had lived for generations. The farmers were offered small living stipends and what they considered inadequate compensation, so they refuse to relocate and organised sit-ins. Police came to the villages many times to "clean out" villagers. Between 1995 and 2005, Mr. Liu Zhengyou, who had been designated by the farmers as their leader, petitioned the government for investigation and review. On April 20, 2005, villagers tried to hand in a petition to the Mayor of Zigong, but were stopped by the police. During the altercation with the police, several villagers were badly injured, including Mr. Liu. Mr. Liu and several others were then briefly detained for "disorderly conduct" and "obstruction of traffic".

The 2010 Peace Nobel Prize winner Liu Xiaobo wrote that when Liu Zhengyou was kidnapped on April 16, 2006, at Beijing Airport to fly to Geneva to attend the UN human rights conference, it was a trial for the new UN Human Rights Council to see if it's capable of responding to this evident human rights abuse and tell the world whether the reformed UN human rights organization can live up to its expectation or not.

Ziliugong (once known as Silver City) is the ancestral home of the Beijing born novelist Li Rui. One of Li Rui's best known works, titled Silver City (旧址, not to be confused with 银城故事), recounts the history of the Li family clan that held large stakes in the salt industry of what is modern day Zigong.

== Books and literature ==
- "The Merchants of Zigong - Industrial Entrepreneurship In Early Modern China by Madeleine Zelin" Columbia Press (ISBN 0-231-13596-3)
- "The Great Well of China" by Hans Ulrich Vogel, Scientific American, June 1993
- "Salt: A World History" by Kurlansky, Mark. Penguin, 2003 (ISBN 0-8027-1373-4)hc (ISBN 0-14-200161-9)pbk
- "On Their Own Terms: Science in China, 1550–1900", Benjamin A. Elman (ISBN 0-674-01685-8)
- "Silver City", Li Rui (ISBN 9780805048957)
- "Small Town", Li JIngrui, LARB China Channel, 5 Oct 2018.
