= Zigong Salt History Museum =

Museum in Zigong, Sichuan, China

Xiqin Guildhall
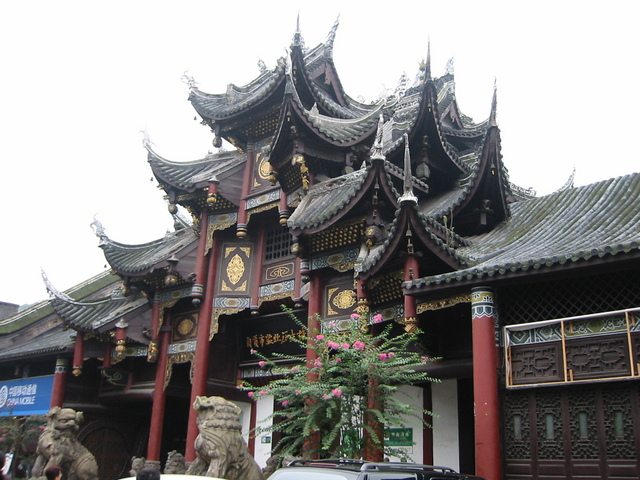
- Xiqin Guildhall

- Location within Sichuan
- Location: Zigong, Sichuan
- Coordinates: 29°21′06″N 104°46′07″E

The Zigong Salt History Museum (Chinese: 自贡市盐业历史博物馆) is a prominent museum located Zigong, Sichuan Province, Southwest China. The museum is situated in the historic Xiqin Guildhall (Chinese: 西秦会馆), originally built between 1736 and 1752 by salt merchants from Shaanxi, during the Qing dynasty, under the reign of the Qianlong Emperor. The guildhall itself is a Major Historical and Cultural Site of China, showcasing the rich history and architectural sophistication of the time. The current museum was due to the urging of Deng Xiaoping and completed in 1959.

== Guildhall ==
The Xiqin Guildhall, also known as the Guandi Hall, served as a meeting place for Shaanxi salt merchants who were instrumental in the salt trade in Zigong. This building, along with another nearby guildhall for Sichuan salt merchants, was located along the Fuxi (pronounced "fu'shee") River (a tributary of the Tuo River), a crucial waterway for transporting salt to China's major river and canal systems. The construction of the guildhall took sixteen years. It has a splendid exterior and exquisite internal structure and decoration, including many delicate stone and wooden carvings. It exemplifies the sophisticated level of architecture technology of its age and symbolized the wealth of the salt merchants. The interior contains a large courtyard with a stone centerpiece of a dragon and phoenix. The guildhall also served as a cultural hub, hosting Sichuan opera for salt merchants as well as local elites in festivals. The exterior of the guild hall building features elaborate flying eaves and a gilded wooden carved interior based around a large galleried atrium where plays were once performed.

== Background ==
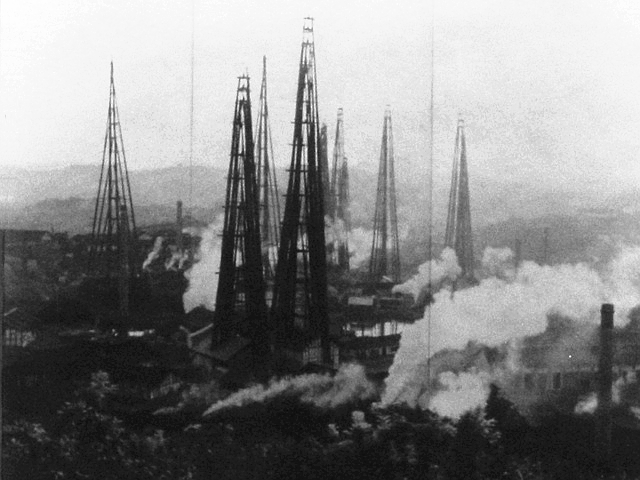
Reproduction of a photograph of the Zigong salt wells, from the display of the Zigong Salt History Museum

The Zigong Salt History Museum, which was established in 1959 following the encouragement of Deng Xiaoping, preserves the extensive history of salt production in the Zigong area, a region historically significant for its salt industry. The museum's exhibits span the entire history of salt mining in China, dating back to the Han dynasty. The Zigong area, located within the Sichuan Basin, became a center of salt production, particularly through the technique of drilling into brine aquifers, a method extensively developed by the Song dynasty.

The museum showcases the advanced drilling techniques used in the region, which enabled the extraction of brine from salt well that reached depths of hundreds of meters, and eventually over one thousand meters by 1835. These techniques included percussive drilling, the use of advanced derricks, specialized bits, and flexible tubing, as well as methods for retrieving lost tools and managing well repairs. The extracted brine was evaporated into solid salt, often using natural gas burners, with the gas also sourced from the same Jialingjiang Formation Triassic geological structure group as the salt. The Zigong Salt History Museum offers a comprehensive view of this important aspect of Chinese history, highlighting the technological advancements and economic significance of the salt industry in Zigong.

== See also ==
- List of museums in China
- List of food and beverage museums
- Salt in Chinese history
