= Luo Qi (engineer) =

Chinese nuclear physicist

- Born: October 1967 (age 58); Fushun County, Sichuan, China
- Education: Xi'an Jiaotong University
- Scientific career
- Fields: Nuclear power
- Workplaces: Nuclear Power Institute of China (NPIC)

Chinese name
- Traditional Chinese: 羅琦
- Simplified Chinese: 罗琦
Transcriptions
Standard Mandarin
- Hanyu Pinyin: Luó Qí

Luo Qi (Chinese: 罗琦; born October 1967) is a Chinese engineer, nuclear physicist, academician of the Chinese Academy of Engineering (CAE), and currently president of Nuclear Power Institute of China (NPIC). He is a member of the China Nuclear Energy Association (CNEA).

== Biography ==
Luo was born in Fushun County, Sichuan, in October 1967. He attended Fushun No.2 High School. He matriculated at Xi'an Jiaotong University in 1984, where he earned a master's degree in thermodynamics. He is a senior engineer, doctoral supervisor and the current president of Nuclear Power Institute of China (NPIC).

He was a member of the 12th National Committee of the Chinese People's Political Consultative Conference and is a member of the 13th National Committee of the Chinese People's Political Consultative Conference.

== Honours and awards ==
- November 22, 2019 Member of the Chinese Academy of Engineering (CAE)
