= Salt in Chinese history =

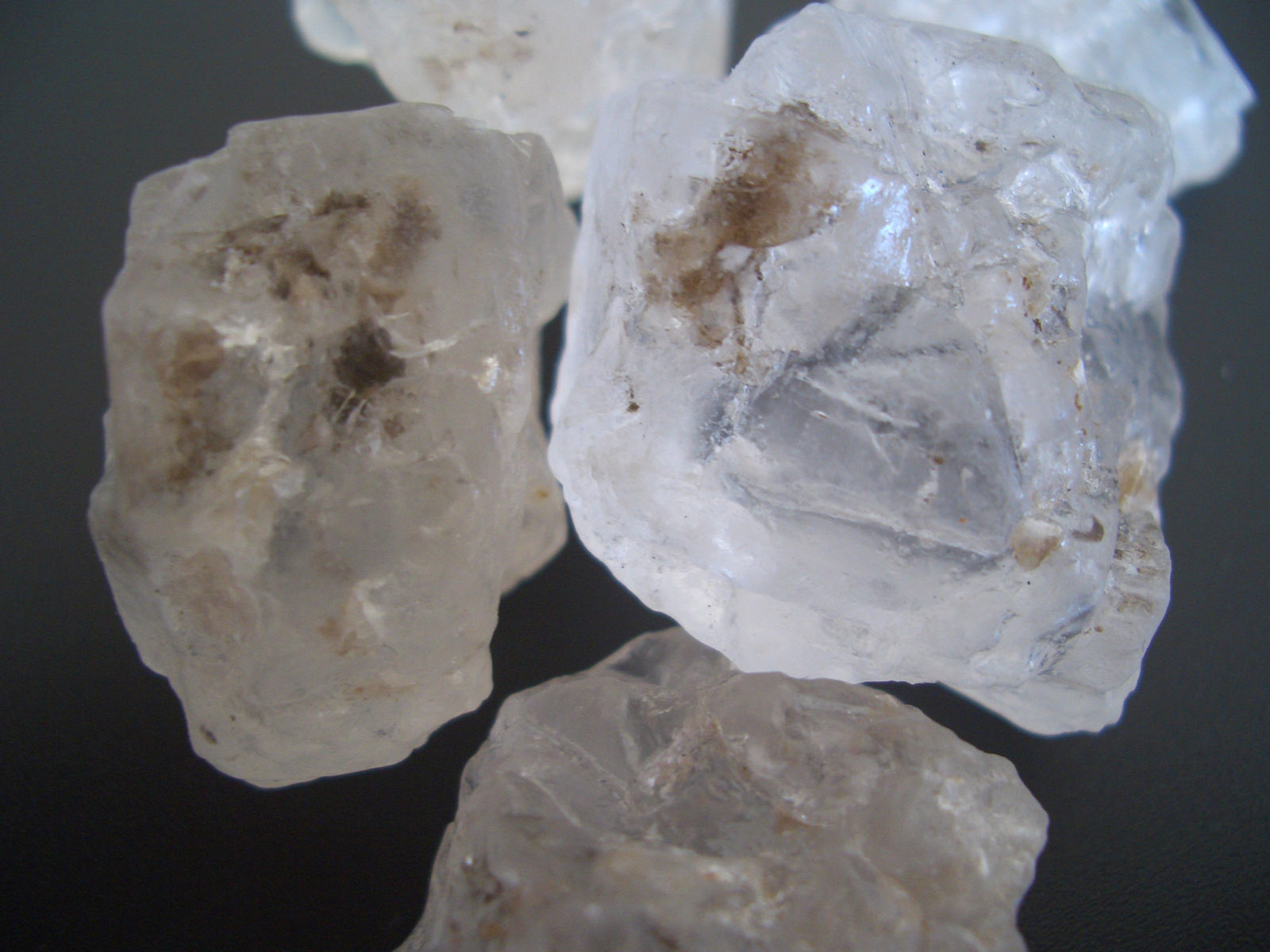
Lake salt from Jilantai (Inner Mongolia, China)

Salt in Chinese history including salt production and salt taxes played key roles in economic development, and relations between state and society in China. The lure of salt profits led to technological innovation and new ways to organize capital. Debate over government salt policies brought forth conflicting attitudes toward the nature of government, private wealth, the relation between the rich and the poor, while the administration of these salt policies was a practical test of a government's competence.

Because salt is a necessity of life, the salt tax (sometimes called the salt gabelle, after the French term for a salt tax) had a broad base and could be set at a low rate and still be one of the most important sources of government revenue. In early times, governments gathered salt revenues by managing production and sales directly. After innovations in the mid-8th century, imperial bureaucracies reaped these revenues safely and indirectly by selling salt rights to merchants who then sold the salt in retail markets. Private salt trafficking persisted, however, because monopoly salt was more expensive and of lower quality. Local bandits thrived on salt smuggling and rebels supported themselves with it. The basic system of bureaucratic oversight and private management provided state revenue second only to the land tax, and, with considerable regional variation and periodic reworking, it remained in place until the mid-20th century.

Salt also played a role in Chinese society and culture. Salt is one of the "seven necessities of life" mentioned in proverbs and "salty" is one of the "five flavors" which form the cosmological basis of Chinese cuisine. Song Yingxing, author of the 17th century treatise, The Exploitation of the Works of Nature explained the essential role of salt:

as there are five phenomena in weather, so are there in the world five tastes… A man would not be unwell if he abstained for an entire year from either the sweet or sour or bitter or hot; but deprive him of salt for a fortnight, and he will be too weak to tie up a chicken…

== Types and geographical distribution ==
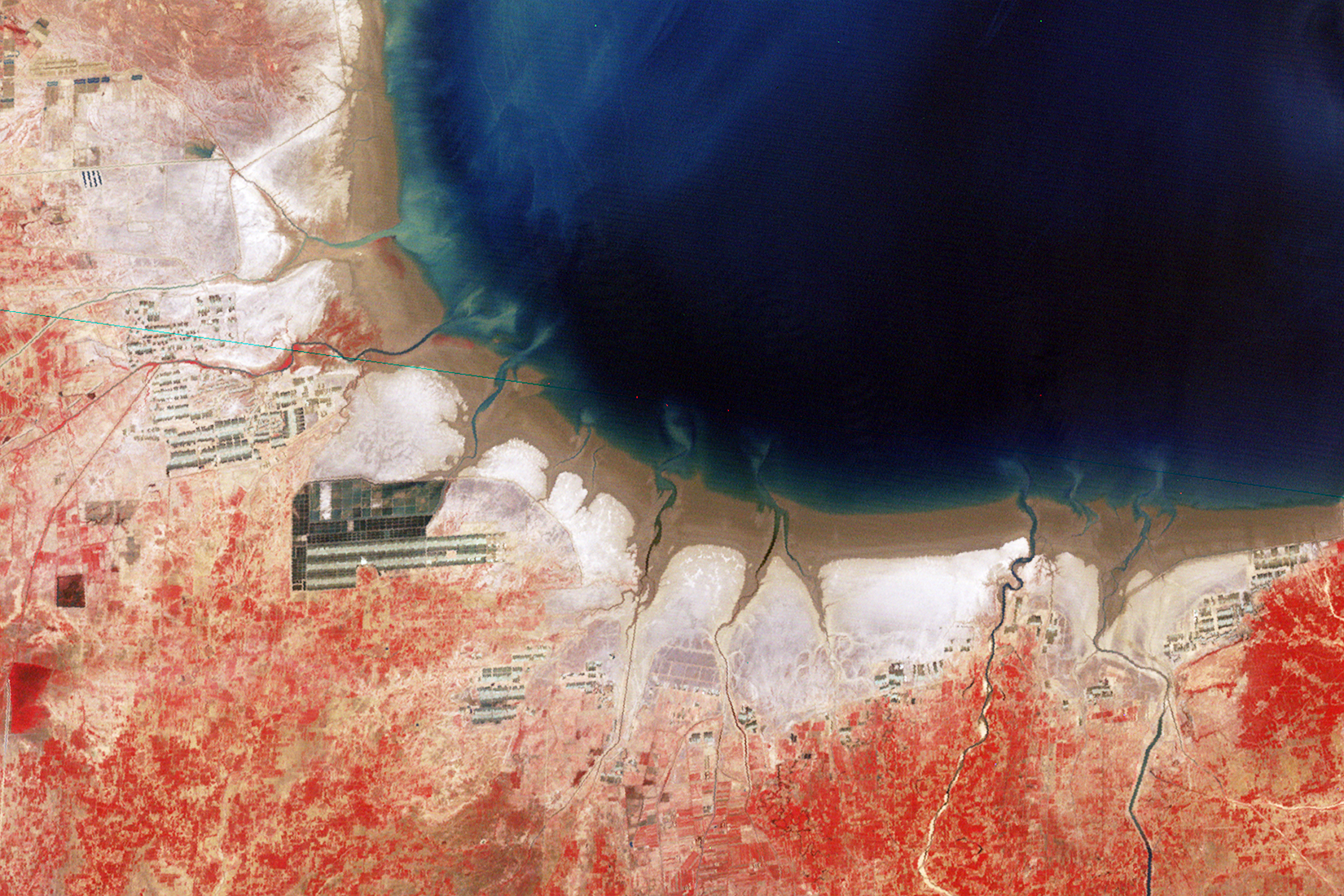
Aquaculture and Salt Production Bohai Bay (Seen from space 1979)

Traditional Chinese writers and modern scholars agree that there are at least five types of salt found in different regions of what is now China:

- Sea salt (海盐; 海鹽; hǎiyán): The most important source. In earliest times, coastal and island salterns used earthen and then iron boiling pans to reduce sea water to salt. By the 3rd century BCE, workers filtered sea water through flat beds of ashes or sand into pits to produce a brine which could be boiled or evaporated by the sun. By the Ming dynasty, salterns in the salt marshes of northern Jiangsu and the eastern seaboard at Changlu, Bohai Bay, near present-day Tianjin, became the largest salt producers and by the late 19th century supplied some 80% of China's salt. Over the course of the 20th century, industrial evaporators replaced these coastal salterns.
- Well salt (井盐; 井鹽; jǐngyán): produced primarily in Sichuan, most famously at Zigong, but also to some extent in Yunnan. Deep borehole drilling technology tapped subterranean salt pools, sometimes to the depth of half a mile, which also produced the natural gas used to boil it. However, even by the end of the 19th century, Sichuan produced only 8% of China's salt.
- Lake salt (池盐; 池鹽; chíyán): produced from salt water lakes in Western China and Central Asia using the same evaporative techniques as for sea water.
- Earth salt (土盐; 土鹽; tǔyán): found in sand from the dried beds of ancient inland seas in Western areas and extracted by rinsing it to produce brine.
- Rock salt (岩盐; 岩鹽; yányán): found in caves in Shaanxi and Gansu. Song Yingxing, the Ming dynasty technology writer, explains that in the prefectures where there is no sea salt or salt wells, people find “rocky caves which produce salt by themselves, its color being like that of red earth. People can freely obtain it by scraping it off without refining it.”

== Ancient China, Qin and Han dynasties ==
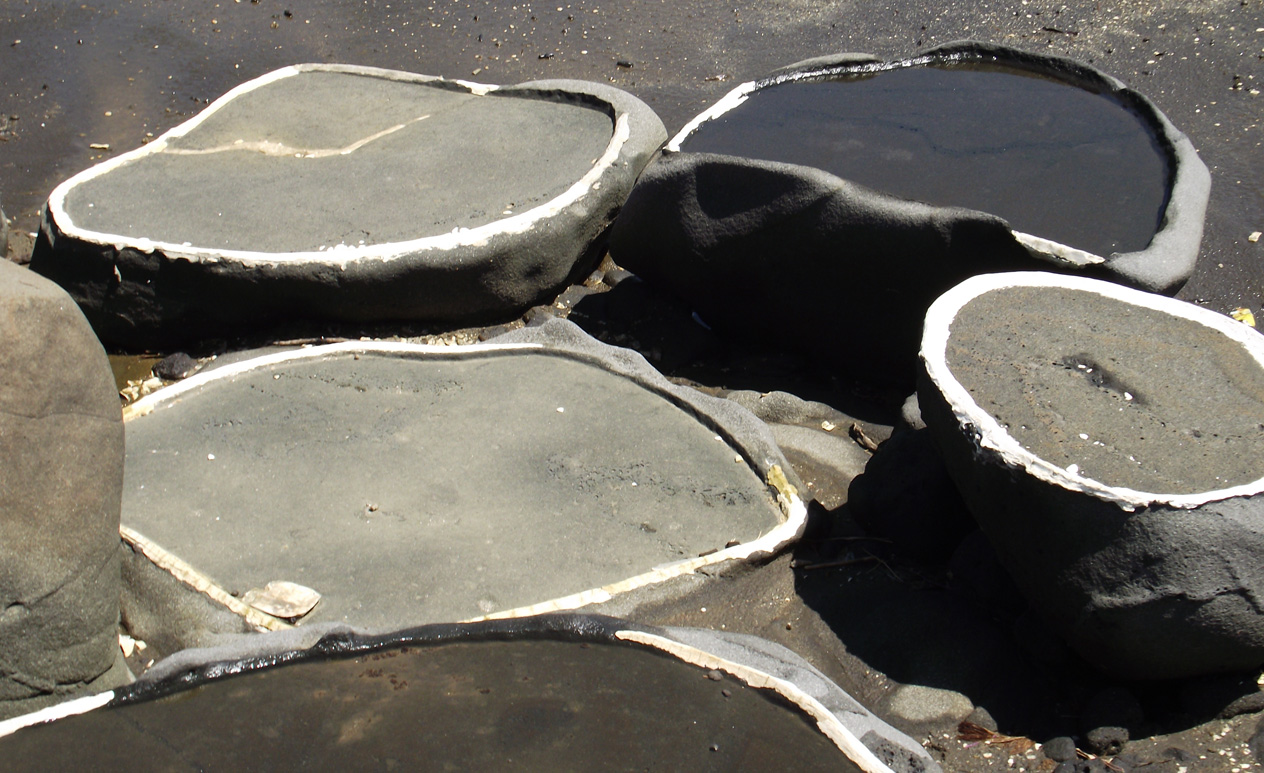
Salt evaporation pans, Yangpu Ancient Salt Field, Hainan Island

As in other ancient centers of civilization, when agriculture replaced hunting, farmers, who ate little meat, needed salt for themselves and for their draft animals. More than a dozen sites on the southwest coast of the Bohai Bay show that the Dawenkou culture was already producing salt from underground brine more than 6,000 years ago during the Neolithic. In the same region, the late Shang dynasty (ca. 1600–1046) produced salt on a large scale and moved it inland in "helmet shaped-vessels" (盔形器; kuixingqi). These pottery jars may have served as "standard units of measurement in the trade and distribution of salt". Oracle bones mention "petty officers for salt" (鹵小臣; lu xiaochen), suggesting that the Shang had officials who oversaw salt production and provisioning. The earliest surviving record of salt production in what is now China is a text from roughly 800 BCE which reports that the much earlier (and perhaps mythical) Xia dynasty reduced sea water for salt. There are reliable reports of the use of iron salt pans in the 5th century BCE. Early states often located their capital cities near ready sources of salt, a consideration which also affected locations in later times.

In the 3rd century BCE, the expansionist and innovative Qin dynasty, in addition to organizing the Sichuan basin water control system at Dujiangyan, discovered that the salt pools which had been used for many centuries were actually fed from deep under the ground, the remnants of an ancient inland sea. The governor of Shu, Li Bing, ordered first that the pools be made deeper, then that wells be dug, and eventually that narrower and more efficient shafts be sunk. By the end of the 2nd century CE, workers had devised a system of leather valves and bamboo pipes which drew up both brine and natural gas, which they burned to boil the brine (the technology they developed for the bamboo piping was eventually applied to household plumbing).

Before the Qin's wars of unification in 221 BCE, salt was produced and traded widely and presented as tribute to the courts of the regional states. The Guanzi, a Han dynasty compilation of texts attributed to the 4th century BCE, includes a perhaps apocryphal discussion between the philosopher Guan Zhong and Duke Huan of the State of Qi on a proposed salt monopoly. The dialogue raised both practical questions about the effectiveness of taxes and moral questions about the nature of government. Guan Zhong argued that direct taxes created resentment among the people, but extolled indirect taxes, such as those on salt and iron:

If you were going to issue an order, "I am going to collect head money upon all of you people, both adults and children," they would certainly remonstrate loudly and angrily against you. However, if you take firm control over the policy on salt, the people cannot manage to dodge it even though you are going to take a profit of one hundred times over.”

The Qin dynasty and the succeeding Han dynasty still left salt production and distribution to merchants and local rulers. However, their profits rivaled the central government's own treasury in size and also took salt workers off the tax rolls. The central government took notice. In 119 BCE, Emperor Wu of Han cast about for ways to finance his expansionist policies, and at the urging of his Legalist advisors, decreed salt and iron to be state monopolies. Fifty or so foundries were established, each using hundreds or even thousands of convict or conscript laborers.

After Emperor Wu's death, his successor convened a court debate in 81 BCE, called the “Discourses on Salt and Iron.” These debates again revealed a sharp disagreement over the purpose of government. The Legalists, or (perhaps more accurately) the Reformists, argued that the state rather than private merchants should organize trade and realize the profits. Confucian moralists replied that a minimalist government was best and argued that for the state to make a profit was to steal from the people and to undermine morality: “trade promotes dishonesty.” The Legalists won the debate; salt provided a major part of government revenue for the remainder of Han rule.

After the fall of the Han in the 2nd century CE, the smaller successor states could not enforce the monopoly reliably and the Sui and early Tang dynasties relied instead on land taxes.

== Tang, Liao and Song dynasties ==
The principles of official supervision and merchant transportation formed during the Tang, Liao, and Song dynasties.

In the 6th and 7th centuries, the Tang government attempted to control markets and the economy directly, but after a period of success, the expense of suppressing the Anshi Rebellion in the 750s drained the treasury at just the time as the government's loss of local control made it difficult to collect the land tax and other direct taxes. Officials looked for ways to raise revenues which did not depend on direct control of production and retail sales.

Chancellor Liu Yan had already proved his worth by using impressed labor to dredge the long silted-over canal connecting the Huai and Yellow rivers; this project lowered transport costs, relieved food shortages, and increased tax revenues with little government investment. The Huai river ran through Northern Jiangsu, the location of coastal salt marshes which were the major source of salt. Liu realized that if the government could control these areas, it could sell the salt at a monopoly price to merchants, who would pass the price difference on to their customers. This monopoly price was an indirect tax which was reliably collected in advance without having to control the areas where the salt was consumed. Liu created a Salt and Iron Commission whose revenues were particularly important since the central government had lost control of the provinces. Even better, the revenue originated in the south, where it could be safely used to buy grain to ship to the capital, Chang'an, by river and canal. In the last century of Tang rule, salt provided more than half of the government's annual revenue and prolonged its life, for a government which managed to control the salt production areas, the canal, and the capital was hard to dislodge. The basic principles of "official supervision, merchant transportation" established at this time lasted fundamentally unchanged until the 20th century. The high price of salt enforced by the monopoly, however, also created an opening for local bandits and rebels who could finance their activities by smuggling salt. Huang Chao, for instance, the late Tang rebel, was a failed exam candidate who became a salt merchant.

In the Song dynasty, the 11th century minister Wang Anshi used state policies to expand the rural economy with crop loans and to reduce social inequality by bringing farmers into the commercial economy. In order to finance these goals, Wang relied on methods like expanding the state's monopoly on salt. Wang's allies had his rival, the poet and official Su Shi (1036–1101), arrested for "defaming the emperor." Su confessed to having written this poem:

An old man of seventy, sickle at his waist,
Feels guilty the spring mountain bamboo and bracken are sweet.
It's not that the music of Shao has made him lose his sense of taste,
But just that he's eaten his food for three months without salt.

The poet admitted that to write of an old man who had no salt was to point to the harshness of the imperial salt monopoly.

The profitable monopoly again survived criticism and was refined for new uses. In the salt marshes of the Huai valley, some 280,000 families worked for the state and were required to sell fixed quotas of salt at low prices. Workers who were forced into debt fled or joined the army. Merchants who helped to provision troops on the frontier were compensated with certificates which entitled them to buy salt and sell it in areas where they were given exclusive rights. Yet the benefit to the central government was limited by regional administrators who intercepted salt revenues for their own purposes. The Khitan-led Liao dynasty adopted many traditional institutions of Han-ruled dynasties, had a Salt Monopoly Office which supervised salt production and distribution, though it is not clear how effective it was.

== Yuan dynasty ==
Early modern technology in salt originated from China's Yuan dynasty.

Increased population, especially in cities, created demand for salt. A combination of government officials and merchant entrepreneurs eagerly invented and deployed new technologies and new ways of organizing salt production, distribution, and taxation. Each type of salt and place of production had a slightly different story.

Salt wells were found primarily in what is now Sichuan, but it was not until the Song dynasty that advances in technology brought increases in production and created tax revenues of consequence (the combination of gas and brine had been exploited from early times, but did not reach volumes useful for transporting any distance for sale until even later, in the 19th century). The poet and official Su Shi who criticized the salt monopoly also described the salt wells in Sichuan:

A round drilling edge is used, being the size of a drinking bowl, while the depth of the borehole amounts to several tens of zhang. Large bamboo stems are used with the septa removed and fitted together by male-female joints to form the well, thus keeping the fresh water out so that the salty spring water comes up by itself. Smaller bamboo tubes are also used which travel up and down in the wells as buckets. They have no bottom, but an orifice is mounted at the top. A piece of leather of several inches in size is hung up. As the tubes go in and out of the brine, the air pushes and sucks, closing and opening the leather valve. Each tube brings up several dou of brine… Where profit is to be had, people do not fail to know about it.

Raising brine from the bottom of a salt well (Sichuan)

Marco Polo visited salt areas in the 13th century Yuan dynasty. His detailed and accurate descriptions of salt production confirm that he had actually been in China. Marco described salt wells and hills where salt could be mined, probably in Yunnan, and reported that in the mountains “these rascals … have none of the Great Khan's paper money, but use salt instead…. They have salt which they boil and set in a mold…. ” (The use of salt for currency continued into at least the 19th century.)

As an official of the Yuan dynasty, however, Polo was more impressed by salt as a source of government revenue than by technology. The Venetian traveler described the Changlu salt region in present-day Hebei province in terms which probably come from direct observation:

Men take a sort of earth which is very saline, and of this they make great mounds. Over these they pour a lot of water so that it trickles through it and becomes briny… Then they collect the water by means of pipes and put it in great vats and iron cauldrons not more than four fingers deep and boil it thoroughly. The salt produced is very pure and fine grained…. [It] is a great source of wealth to the inhabitants and of revenue to the Great Khan.

Polo did not entirely understand what he saw, however. As explained in the Aobo Tu, workers actually sprinkled sea water on the fields which then filtered through sand or fine ash into pits, or perhaps he could have seen “earth salt” derived from soil.

== Complication and frustration in the Ming dynasty ==
Beginning almost immediately after the founding of the dynasty in 1368, the Ming government found it hard to supply its armies in Central Asia. Officials granted merchants who delivered grain to the frontier garrisons the right to buy salt certificates (鹽引; yányǐn) which entitled them to buy government salt at monopoly prices which they could then sell in protected markets. One scholar has called this salt-grain exchange a “unique combination of state monopoly and market initiative, bridging state and market.” The merchants, however, soon circumvented the system by selling the certificates to others rather than undertaking risky expeditions to deliver the salt, leading to hoarding and speculation.

Lu (鹵) (Rock Salt; Salt on Land)

The system of government production and merchant distribution required a strong and adaptive bureaucracy. To begin with, the Ming government inherited from the preceding Yuan dynasty not a unified national system but a dozen or more regional monopolies, each of which had a different production center, none of which was allowed to distribute salt to the others. Officials tried to control production by continuing the Yuan system of registering hereditary salt producing households (竈戶; zàohù). These families were not allowed to change their occupation or where they lived and were required to produce a yearly quota of salt (in the beginning, a little more than 3,000 catties). Initially, the government paid these saltern families with rice, then in the 15th century in paper money. By the 16th century the system broke down. Government monopoly salt was too expensive to compete with smuggled blackmarket salt, forcing officials to raise prices in order to meet their tax revenue quotas, making the government salt even less competitive and giving saltern families even more reason to sell to smugglers. Officials estimated that two-thirds of the salt in the Lianghuai region was contraband. A series of crises followed in which inland prices dropped too low for merchants to make a profit, armies on the frontier went without grain, and small mountains of salt might sit unused because officials impounded them for taxes then could not sell them.

=== Salt Producers in Ming ===
Salt production during the Ming period mainly took place in China's coastal regions and salt lakes. Although there were different techniques to obtain salt, boiling seawater and evaporating seawater under the sun were the two popular methods of isolating salt. Both techniques of salt production required dry and sunny weather. During Ming times, boiling seawater was the most prevailing technique. Salt producers laid down reeds and straws to absorb and concentrate seawater and then boiled it to isolate the salt grains. The technique of sunshine exposure was occasionally used in Fujian and was not commonly applied nationally until the late Ming period. Saltern households were generally called yan hu (盐户), and specifically, those who boiled seawater were called zao hu (灶户). Other techniques were applied in inland regions of China. In Yunnan, salt was obtained through the mining of saline rocks. In Shanxi and Shaanxi, salt was gathered in the summer when the salt lake dried up. And in Sichuan, brine wells were dug and then the brine was boiled. Household that boiled brine also had to obtain fuel, in the form of natural gas or burning firewood and straw, in order to heat up their furnaces.

The majority of salt producers in Ming times consisted of young men from saltern households, who were assigned by the government, although some prisoners were also forced to produce salt as part of their sentence until they had served their prison terms. Salt production was passed on generationally within their households. The households would be registered under a regional distribution center, where they would receive a quota on the quantity of salt produced. Families that produced salt through boiling brine could receive tools from the state if they did not have that capital. In early Ming, salt producers would congregate under the supervision of salt patrols and boil the seawater in an officially provided iron plate. The government believed that this congregational salt production allowed the officials to conveniently control the amount of fuel, iron plates, and salt produced so that they were able to prevent the trade of contraband salt. However, in reality, salt producers would collude with salt patrols to gain profit from contraband salt. After Jiajing’s reign (1522–1566), the salt ministry became financially unable to provide iron plates due to the great cost of manufacture and replacement. As a result, the government reluctantly permitted merchants to provide cauldrons to the producers, although it was argued that cauldrons were the reason for contraband salt. The congregational salt production in turn collapsed into individual saltern household production.

The methods of payment from the government differed throughout the Ming period, but included grain, money, subsidies, and decreased or voided land tax. In the 16th century, salt producers were able to sell over-quota salt directly to licensed salt merchants who purchased a fixed amount of salt from the imperial government first. Before the government held an absolute monopoly of salt industry and would not legitimate salt producers' direct transaction to the merchants, until it encountered a serious financial shortage of salt manufacture. Salt merchants, however, were only licensed to purchase a limited amount of salt, and they had to pay the tax to the government for exceeded amount. Towards the end of the Ming period, selling the non-quota salt became the main income source for salt producing families. Some salt producers became wealthier and purchased other saltern households, while providing them with the tools and capital to do their work. These wealthier producers could then benefit from the low land tax given by the government and could further rent out the extra farmland as another source of income. Those that kept salt producers under them could meet the salt quota, and therefore avoided the corvee work that the government asked of salt producers.

Throughout the Ming dynasty, the number of salt producers had suffered a great decline, and one of the reasons is the corvee labor that salt producers had to take on. In Ming times, the corvee assigned to salt producers included being enlisted as soldiers in the local army and navy, as servants for local government, or as criminal patrolmen, etc. The extra agricultural work contributed the most burden to salt producers, as they had to plant and harvest as intensively as a farming household, while collecting and drying salt. Although in 1384, the government had already exempted the salt-producing households from extra work, this policy was not effectively enforced throughout the country, because salt producers were administered by both the salt ministry, who collected salt from them, and the local government, who collected the crops. This led to a large number of salt producers fleeing from their occupation, which caused a huge loss in the national salt industry and economy.

=== The moral debate over salt and society ===
Writers turned to poetry and fiction to continue a debate which had been started centuries earlier by Guanzi and the Han dynasty Discourses on Salt and Iron: practical men argued that monopoly revenues helped the state in its mission while Confucian critics argued that government monopolies enriched some groups and left others poor and exploited. These critics added that salt taxes afflicted the people and the revenue encouraged expansionary wars which would doom the empire. Each side claimed the moral high ground.

Bai Juyi's Tang dynasty poem, “The Salt Merchant’s Wife” (c. 808), commented on the luxurious life of the salt merchant's wife whose boat took her from place to place:

The salt merchant’s wife has gold and silver in plenty,
Yet she does not work in the fields or tend silkworms.
Wherever she goes, north, south, east, or west, she never leaves her home.
Wind and waves are her village, her ship her mansion.

A 13th century Yuan dynasty poem describes the quite different conditions among the hereditary "boiling households" (saltern households):

The boiling households’ distress is growing day by day
The village jails are constantly in disorder
The wretched clothes are too short to cover the shins
and sometimes there is no rice in the broken steaming pot.
Towards the end of the year no brine can be produced,
and many are put in shackles and flogged to death.
Where will there be parents [i.e. virtuous officials] for the people?

Hereditary salt merchants in the city of Yangzhou became the symbol of conspicuous excess. One merchant commissioned a chamber pot made of gold which was so tall that he had to climb a ladder to use it. These families maintained their positions for generations by emphasizing education for their sons and steady payments to government officials.

This luxurious life-style was financed by the exploitative monopoly prices charged by the village retailers whose wealth put them above the law. The late Ming and early Qing writer, Pu Songling caught this cynicism when he remarked that "What the state defines as illegal is that which does not follow its rule, while officials and merchants label as smuggling that which they do not smuggle themselves."

Pu's short story, "The Salt Smuggler" told of the Judge of Purgatory who needed help cleaning out newly arrived sinners who were choking the rivers and eighteen hells. The Judge sent to the upper world for one Wang Shi, a village salt peddler. When Wang demanded to know why he, of all people, had been chosen, the Judge of Purgatory gave this satirical and paradoxical explanation:

Those who drive an illicit trade in salt, not only defraud the State of its proper revenue, but also prey upon the livelihood of the people. Those, however, whom the greedy officials and corrupt traders of to-day denounce as unlicensed traders, are among the most virtuous of mankind, needy unfortunates who struggle to save a few cash in the purchase of their pint of salt. Are they your unlicensed traders?

== Prosperity and reform in the Qing dynasty ==
When the Qing dynasty was founded in the middle of the 17th century, the court immediately seized the saltern areas in order to cut off supplies to their enemies and gain the revenues for themselves. They revived the ten zone system set up in the Song dynasty which the Ming inherited from the Yuan, and continued the merchant-official alliance. Over the course of the dynasty, even vigorous administration could not prevent the accumulation of problems.

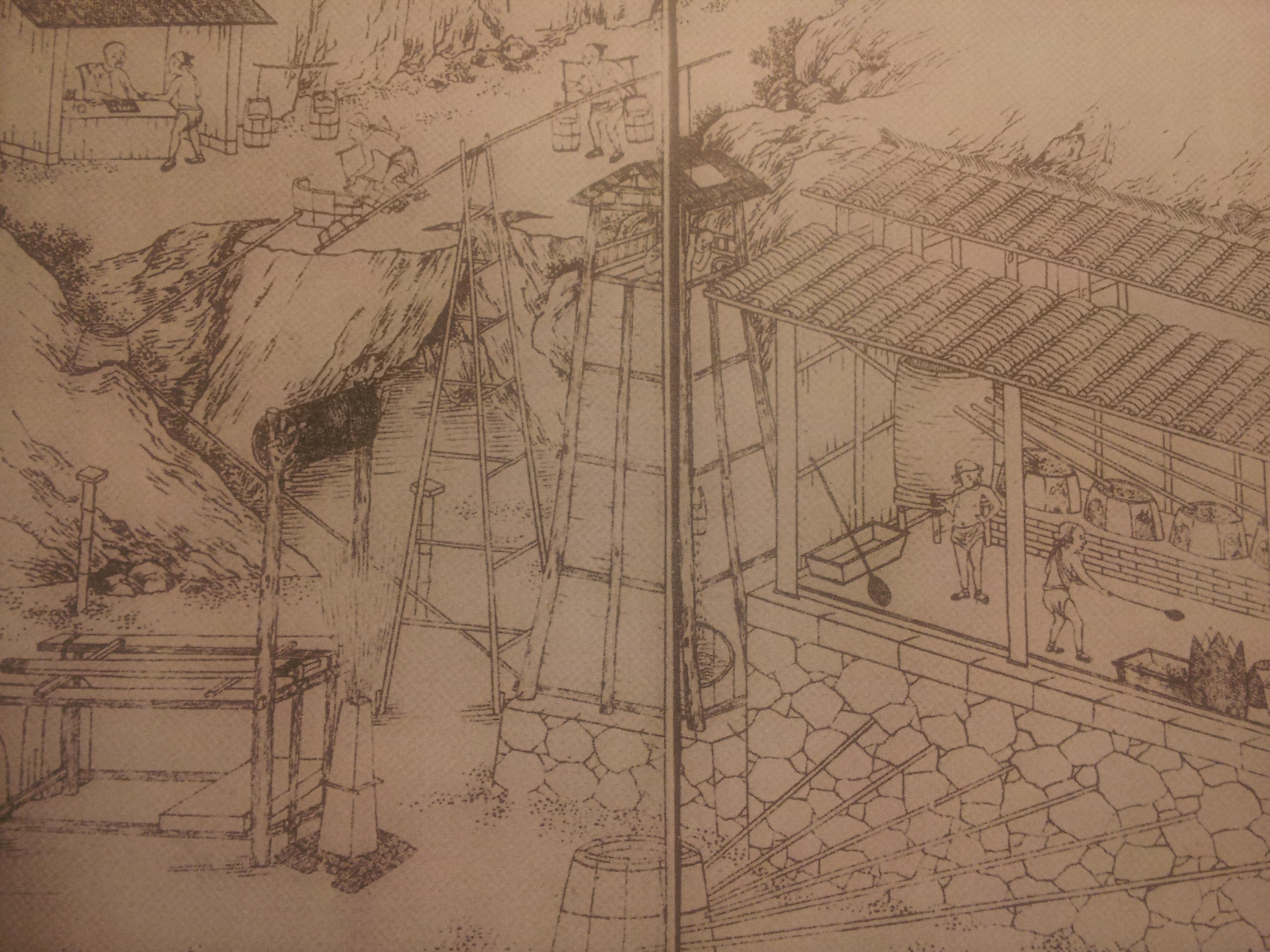
Salt evaporation

Manchu armies nearly destroyed the prosperous salt city of Yangzhou when it offered resistance. Although it had no natural resources or production, the city recovered quickly because it was the country's single most important salt administrative headquarters. The city was strategically located on the north bank of the Yangzi River near the junction with the Grand Canal which transported salt and grain north. The Salt Commissioner who was headquartered at Yangzhou supervised the Lianghuai district, which shipped salt to seven provinces: Jiangsu, Anhui, Henan, Jiangxi, Hunan, Hubei, and Guizhou. The rights to salt produced along the coast were controlled by some 200 Yangzhou merchants who were supervised by the Commissioner but operated privately, making them richer and more powerful than those in other regions. These merchants became patrons of opera, publishing, and painting, but depended on imperial whim. They prudently showered the Kangxi Emperor with praise and gifts when he visited their luxurious gardens and attended their opera performances.

The merchants of the Changlu Salt Syndicate in Tianjin were only slightly less wealthy and influential. Like Yangzhou, Tianjin had little natural wealth, but used its location on the Grand Canal to become a transshipment center and developed the nearby Changlu salterns as a source of capital.

Government Salt Superintendents also accumulated fortunes. They could under-report tax revenues and keep the difference for themselves; they could accept fees from applicants for office; or, with a clear conscience, simply accept gifts from salt merchants who were grateful for their help. A good example is Cao Yin (1658–1711). As a personal bondservant and childhood playmate of the Kangxi Emperor, Cao became so rich and influential that he played host four times to the Emperor in his tours of the south. In 1705, as a mark of favor, the emperor ordered Cao, an accomplished scholar, to compile all shi (lyric poems) surviving from the Tang dynasty. Cao compiled and published the Complete Tang Poems using proceeds from the Salt Administration. Yet even such a well-connected official relied on the whim of the emperor. The Cao family lost favor and fortune when a new emperor came to the throne, a fall from grace reflected in Dream of the Red Chamber, the nostalgic novel written by Cao Yin's grandson Cao Xueqin.

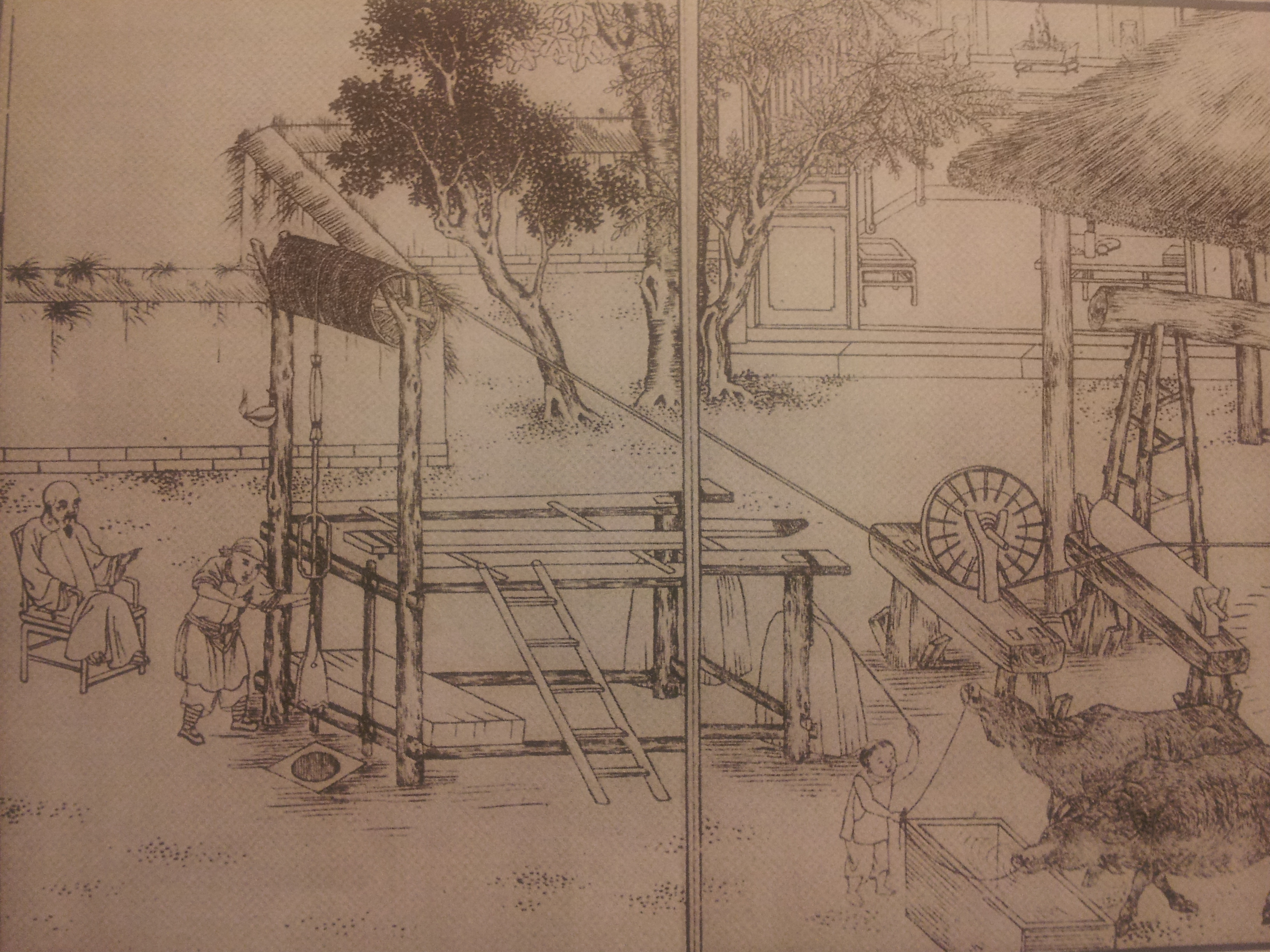
Drilling a well Ziliujing, Sichuan, 19th century

The early Qing emperors placed personnel decisions and supervision of the salt gabelle in the hands of the Imperial Household Department. Since the department was housed within the Forbidden City, where the emperor lived for much of the year, the emperor and his personal servants could control the revenues directly, whereas much of the land tax, the other major revenue source, was siphoned off at the local level or committed to other expenses. In the last years of the Qianlong era at the close of the 18th century, the Household Department under the eunuch Heshen became corrupt and lax, filling the salt administration with lax and greedy officials. Without competent and honest supervision, merchants once again speculated in salt certificates and officials were incapable of raising their assigned levels of revenue. By the early 19th century, merchant families could not deliver the massive amounts of salt they had contracted but instead raised prices to yield steady profits. Smuggled and black market salt then rose to meet demand and soon outweighed official sales. Government revenues fell.

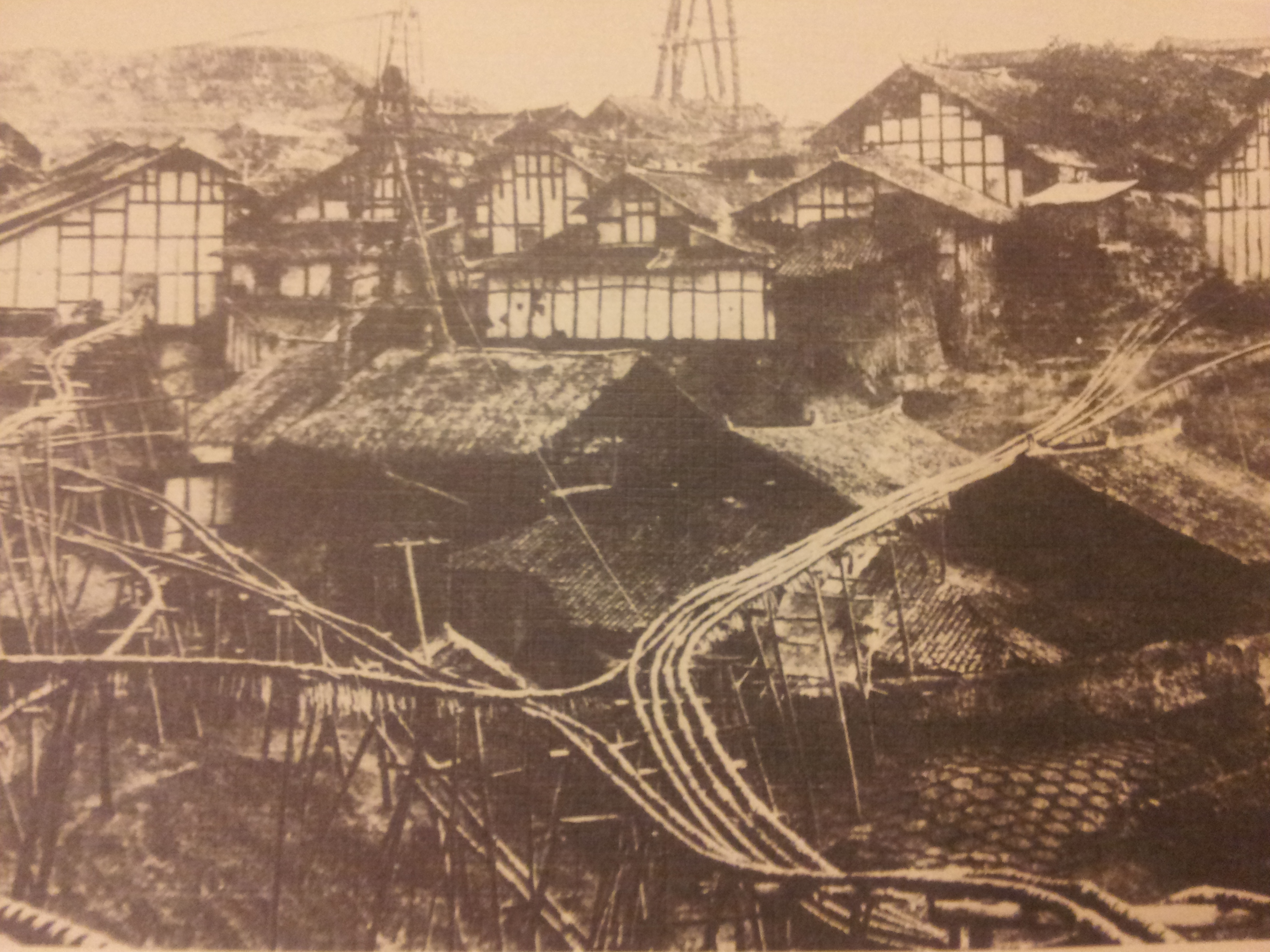
Ziliujing Sichuan, 19th century

When the Daoguang Emperor came to the throne in 1820, he was alarmed at the outflow of silver to pay for opium. In the years leading up to the Opium Wars fiscal reform became an emotional as well as fiscal issue. In 1832, the emperor appointed the reform-minded official Tao Zhu to head the Lianghuai Salt Administration. Tao immediately ended the Ming franchise system in favor of a relatively open market. He ordered that merchants of good standing could buy salt certificates for a large or small amount of salt which could be retailed wherever the merchant wished. The certificates themselves could be bought and sold. In the short term, however, Tao could not make good on his promises for delivery of salt and revenue, and was forced to retire. Nevertheless, the system had been changed and the bureaucracy of the dynasty showed a greater ability to adapt than later critics gave it credit for.

By the beginning of the 20th century, there was not so much a national system as a venerable patchwork of production, distribution, and taxation. The salt trade in one province, Hunan, was estimated to involve some 1,000 traders, six to nine thousand junkmen, and about 1,000 state employees and officials, including police. In the broader Lianghuai region altogether some 369,000 people were employed, including 230,000 laborers in the salt fields.

== The 20th century and the end of the salt gabelle ==
=== The Sino-foreign Salt Inspectorate and the Republic of China, 1913–1949 ===
With the 1911 Revolution, the imperial system fell, but the old patchwork salt system survived. In 1913, the president of the young new republic, Yuan Shikai, negotiated with foreign banks a series of Reorganization Loans which were intended to shore up the central government in relation to the provinces. The foreign banks insisted that the loans were to be repaid from the most reliable sources of government income, that is, the maritime customs, the land tax, and the salt tax. Yuan agreed to set up a joint Sino-Foreign Salt Administration to monitor collection of the salt tax and remit the required portions to foreign creditors.

The Sino-Foreign Salt Administration, which lasted until 1949, became, in the words of one historian, a "veritable model of a successful, well-institutionalized, high prestige organization that elicited the loyalty and commitment of its Chinese and foreign staff even as it operated in an extremely turbulent, often hostile environment.” Moreover, it provided a series of central governments in this period with their second most important source of tax revenues.

The Salt Administration faced continuous challenges. From 1913 to 1918 it was led by Sir Richard Dane, a British civil servant and colonial administrator who had retired from the Salt Excise in India, where he had been nicknamed “the salt king”. Dane was, in the words of one writer, a “colonial cliché,” complete with a bushy moustache and walking stick, who might have provoked nationalist opposition. Historian Samuel Adshead sees Chinese and foreigners in the Salt Administration as being "co-modernizers." He puts Dane among the "leading figures of European imperialism in China" but one who took his responsibility seriously. Dane resisted both foot-dragging by the Chinese local authorities and the attempts by foreign powers to obtain more salt than what was legally required. Dane restructured the bureaucracy and hired energetic and competent Chinese and foreign officers.

In contrast to the Imperial Maritime Customs Service, the Salt Administration had only a few dozen foreign employees and more than 5,000 Chinese ones. It did not enter domestic salt trade and tax collection; it concerned itself only with gathering salt revenues to repay the Reorganization Loans and depositing the "salt surplus," that is, what was left over, to foreign banks for use by whichever Chinese government was recognized by the foreign powers. But after 1922, Chinese provincial leaders and local military commanders no longer allowed these funds to leave the territories they controlled; central government salt revenues fell disastrously, though payments to foreign governments continued. The Salt Administration was also useful in organizing and financing army units. The eight regiments under General Sun Li-jen were among the most effective Chinese troops during the Second Sino-Japanese War.

When these foreign governments extended diplomatic recognition to the Nationalist Government of Chiang Kai-shek in 1928, they used salt revenue to reward the new government's agreement to continue loan payments contracted by its predecessors. In 1931, salt taxes provided nearly a third of the revenue in the government's public budget. Private competition with government salt soon appeared. The Jiuda Salt Industries, starting in 1914, had built a modern chemical and salt works, with seven production plants at Tianjin. The company eventually manipulated its political networks so that by 1936 it had challenged the monopoly of the salt gabelle in order to take advantage of its more efficient technology but still did not gain a major share of the market. Some salt merchants, such as the Sichuan merchant Zeng Junchen, in the face of rising salt taxes and government monopoly, used their capital and official connections to enter the opium trade.

At the start of the Second Sino-Japanese War in 1937, Japanese troops quickly seized the salterns in North China. Soon more than half the salt revenue was either uncollected, retained by needy local governments, or taken by the Japanese. The Nationalist government reluctantly allowed the Salt Administration, which legally was a foreign agency, to maintain offices in Shanghai to avoid providing the Japanese with an excuse to set up a puppet salt administration. Payments to the foreign banks were maintained, but at great cost. After 1941 the foreign staff largely resigned or left. Smugglers managed to meet much of the demand for salt in Free China, but the government lost important revenue. Since Japanese homeland did not produce enough salt to meet the demands of industrial production, the Japanese organized special companies which early in the war exported over 900,000 tons a year from North China and Manchuria.

Nationalist government attempts to collect salt taxes during and immediately after the war provoked resistance from small-scale local salt producers in North China. The Chinese Communist Party gained a foothold in these areas when it promised to support salt produces against government collectors.

=== Salt, politics, and health in the People’s Republic of China ===
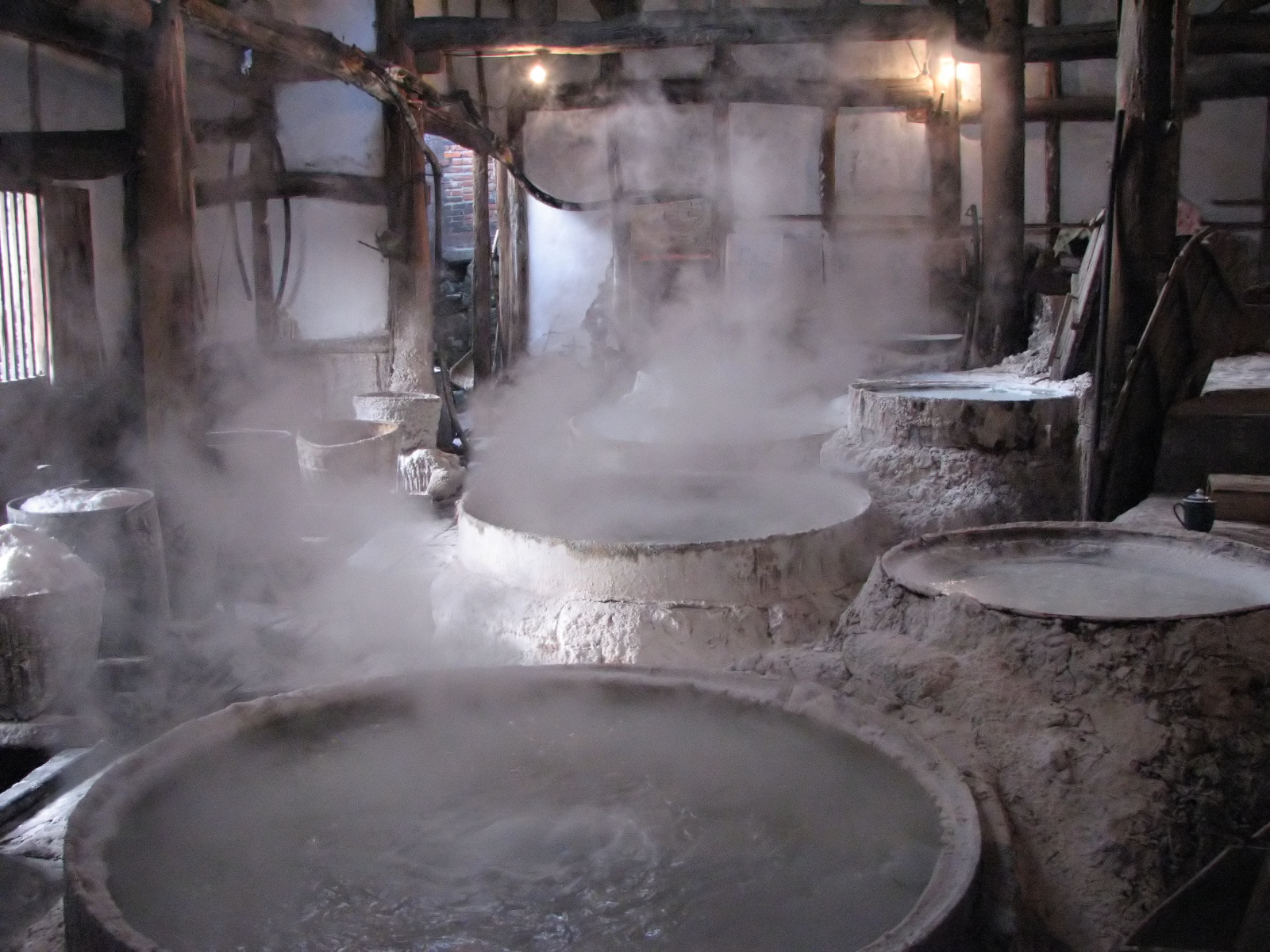
Industrial Salt Evaporators at Zigong

With the founding of the China National Salt Industry Corporation in February 1950, the new government re-established the monopoly of salt production, eventually driving old style and private salt companies out of business. By the 1960s, old style methods of producing salt gave way to large scale production in state owned factories. Improved infrastructure increased access to the major salt flats of Qinghai, such as those surrounding Dabusun Lake. The Zigong Salt Museum preserves one well to demonstrate the traditional methods, but by 2011, China's production of table salt was the largest in the world. The monopoly was abolished in 2017.

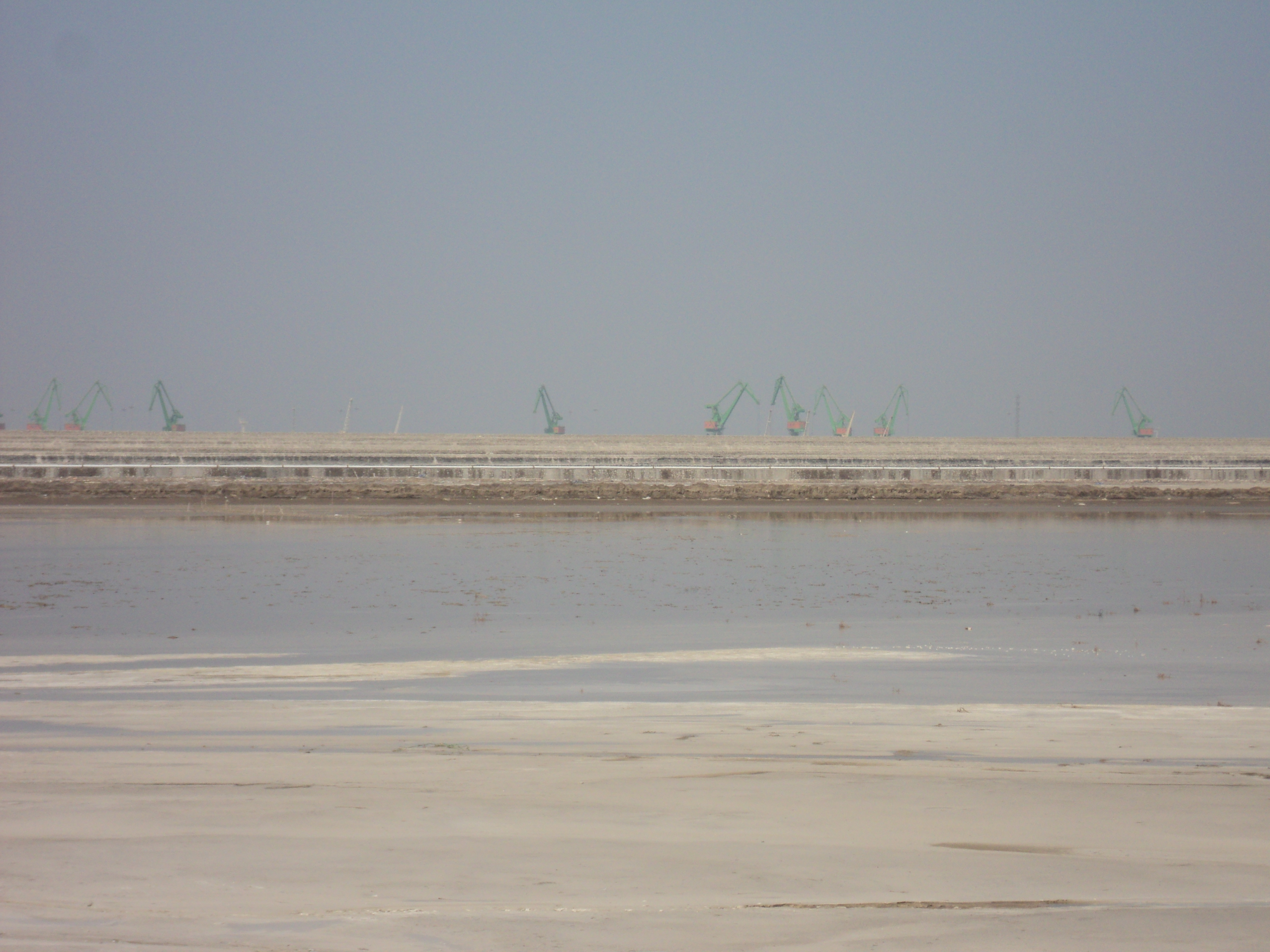
Present Day Salt Flats at Tianjin

As elsewhere in the world, salt became a public health concern. The government took steps to combat the historical problem of iodine deficiency in the western, southern, and eastern regions of the country, which historically did not derive their salt from ocean water. To eliminate sources of non-iodized salt from private salt producers, the Chinese government established a salt police with 25,000 officers to enforce the salt monopoly. Consumption of iodized salt reached 90% of the Chinese population by 2000.

In 2014, the Chinese government announced that it would end government monopoly in salt production, and by January 2017 producers were allowed to directly sell to consumers although at a monitored price. According to the Financial Times, the reform was partly induced by the relatively small income generated by the salt monopoly, which amounted to around USD 3 billion in 2015. However, most salt companies remained state-owned.

== Salt in Chinese cuisine ==
“Salty” is one of the “five flavors” of Chinese herbology and Chinese cuisine which Chinese see as the basis of good food. Salt is not generally sprinkled on a dish at the last moment or at the table, as is often the case in western cooking, but is more often one of the ingredients.

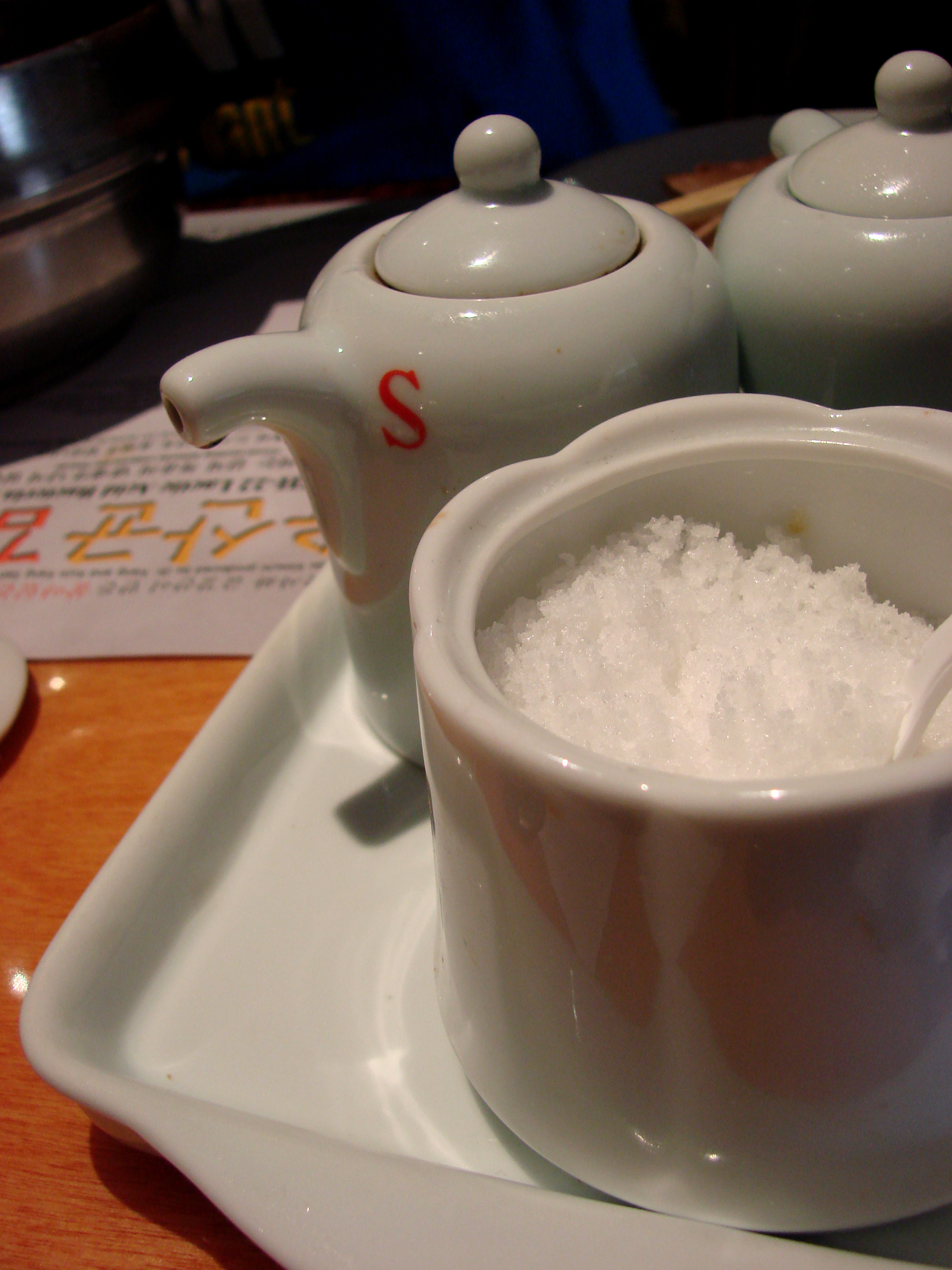
Salt on a Chinese Restaurant Table

The ancient Chinese found that salt, because it inhibits bacteria, was useful both in preserving foods and in controlling fermentation; without salt, the yeasts and sugars produced by vegetable decay would rot and turn to alcohol. From early times, pickles, sauces, and special dishes featured salt a main ingredient. Douchi, which was found in a tomb dated 165 BC, is salted and fermented soy beans, the oldest food made from that product. Soy sauce, produced when the fermentation of the beans is controlled by salt at just the right stage, may have originated in the desire to make the supply of salt go farther. Chinese vegetable pickles may be either fermented or marinated, most famously in Pao cai from cabbage, or Zha cai (pressed vegetable), also known as Sichuan vegetable.

Present day Chinese cooking techniques include using salt to preserve eggs, such as Salted duck eggs; roasting a chicken in a crust of salt; and serving fish on a bed of salt. The index of one authoritative Chinese cookbook lists nine recipes with "salt" in the title.

In recent years, Chinese cooks have become concerned about the health risks of sodium. The Hong Kong food authority Pearl Kong Chen admonishes that traditionally Chinese people ate large amounts of plain rice, with no soy sauce or salt added and only small amounts of meat or vegetables seasoned with salt or soy sauce. In recent times, she warns, the proportion of meat and vegetables has increased, along with seaweed, oyster sauce, and salted fish and vegetables, causing an unhealthy increase in sodium consumption.

== See also ==
Salt in General

- Salt
- History of salt
- Sea salt: Historical production
- Salt evaporation pond
- Salt pans
- Open pan salt making (In Europe)
- Salt tax in India
- Salt roads

Salt in China

- Discourses on Salt and Iron
- Salt tax
- Economic history of China before 1912
- Taxation in premodern China
- Fish sauce
- Soy sauce#Types
- Han dynasty
- Taiwan Salt Museum
- Yancheng "Salt City" (named after the salt fields surrounding it).

== References and further reading ==
- Adshead, Samuel Adrian M. (1970). The Modernization of the Chinese Salt Administration, 1900–1920. Cambridge: Harvard University Press. ISBN 0674580605.
- Adshead, Samuel Adrian M. (1992). Salt and Civilization. New York: St. Martin's Press. ISBN 0312067852.
- Baumler, Alan (2008). The Chinese and Opium under the Republic: Worse than Floods and Wild Beasts. SUNY Press. ISBN 9780791469545.
- Chiang, Tao-Chang (1975). "The Salt Industry of Ming China". Geographical Review. 65 (1).
- Chiang, Tao-Chang (1976). "The Production of Salt in China, 1644–1911". Annals of the Association of American Geographers. 66 (4): 516–530.
- Chiang, Tao-Chang (1983). "The Salt Trade in Ch'ing China". Modern Asian Studies. 17 (2): 197–219.
- Chien, Cecilia Lee-fang (2004). Salt and State: An Annotated Translation of the Songshi Salt Monopoly Treatise (EPUB) (Thesis). Ann Arbor, MI: University of Michigan Center for Chinese Studies.
- Flad, Rowan K. (2011). Salt Production and Social Hierarchy in Ancient China : An Archaeological Investigation of Specialization in China's Three Gorges. Cambridge; New York: Cambridge University Press. ISBN 9781107009417.
- Ebrey, Patricia Buckley; Walthall, Anne; Palais, James B. (2006). East Asia: A Cultural, Social, and Political History. Boston, MA: Houghton Mifflin. ISBN 0618133844.
- Gale, Esson M (1930). "Public Administration of Salt in China: A Historical Survey". Annals of the American Academy of Political and Social Science. 152: 241–251. JSTOR 1016558.
- Gale, Esson McDowell (1953). Salt for the Dragon: A Personal History of China, 1908–1945. East Lansing: Michigan State College Press.
- Guo, Zhengzhong (1997). 中国盐业史 [The History of Salt Industry in China]. Beijing: People’s Publishing House.
- Hoi, Elise (Spring 2011). "Salt of the Early Civilizations: Case Studies on China". Penn History Review. 18 (2): 69–99. Archived from the original on March 6, 2016.
- Huang, Ray (1974). Taxation and Governmental Finance in Sixteenth-Century in Ming China. New York and London: Cambridge University Press. ISBN 9780521104876.
- Kuan, Huan (1931). Discourses on Salt and Iron: A Debate on State Control of Commerce and Industry in Ancient China, Chapters I-XIX. Translated by Gale, Esson M. Leyden: E. J. Brill.
- Kurlansky, Mark (2003). Salt: A World History. New York: Penguin Books. ISBN 0142001619.
- Kwan, Man Bun (2001). The Salt Merchants of Tianjin: State-making and Civil Society in Late Imperial China. Honolulu: University of Hawai'i Press. ISBN 0824822757.
- Liu, Li; Chen, Xingcan (2012). The Archaeology of China: From the Late Paleolithic to the Early Bronze Age. Cambridge: Cambridge University Press. pp. 217–218. ISBN 978-0-521-64432-7.
- Metzger, Thomas (1972). "The Organizational Capabilities of the Ch'ing State in Commerce". In Willmott, William E (ed.). Economic Organization in Chinese Society. Stanford University Press.
- Needham, Joseph; Ronan, Colin (1991). "Salt industry and Deep Borehole Drilling". In Hook, Brian; Twitchett, Denis Crispin (eds.). The Cambridge Encyclopedia of China (2nd ed.). Cambridge; New York: Cambridge University Press. pp. 446–447. ISBN 052135594X.
- Perry, Elizabeth J. (1980). Rebels and Revolutionaries in North China, 1845-1945. Stanford, Calif.: Stanford University Press. ISBN 0804710554.
- Rowe, William T. (2009). China's last empire: the great Qing. Cambridge, MA: Harvard University Press. ISBN 9780674036123.
- Song, Yingxing (1966). T'ien-Kung K'ai-Wu; Chinese Technology in the Seventeenth Century. Translated by Sun and, E. Tu Zen; Sun, Shiou-Chuan. University Park: Pennsylvania State University. Reprinted: New York: Dover, 1997. .
- Strauss, Julia C. (1998). Strong institutions in weak polities : state building in Republican China, 1927–1940. Oxford: Oxford University Press. ISBN 0198233426.
- Thaxton, Ralph (1997). Salt of the earth : the political origins of peasant protest and communist revolution in China. Berkeley: University of California Press. ISBN 0520203186.
- Torbert, Preston M. (1977). The Chʻing Imperial Household Department: A Study of Its Organization and Principal Functions, 1662–1796. Harvard University Press. ISBN 978-0-674-12761-6.
- Vogel, Hans Ulrich (June 1993). "The Great Well of China". Scientific American.
- Vogel, Hans Ulrich (2008). "Salt in China". Encyclopaedia of the History of Science, Technology, and Medicine in Non-Western Cultures. Springer. pp. 1914–17.
- Vogel, Hans Ulrich (2013). Marco Polo Was in China: New Evidence from Currencies, Salts and Revenues. Leiden; Boston: Brill. ISBN 9789004231931.
- von Rosthorn, Arthur (1893). The Salt Administration of Ssuch'Uan. Shanghai: Royal Asiatic society.
- Wan, Ming (2012). "Discourses on Salt and Iron: A First Century B.C. Chinese Debate over the Political Economy of Empire". Journal of Chinese Political Science. 17 (2): 143–163. doi:10.1007/s11366-012-9190-6.
- Worthy, Edmund H (1975). "Regional Control in the Southern Sung Salt Administration". In Haeger, J. W. (ed.). Crisis and Prosperity in Sung China. Tucson: University of Arizona Press.
- Yoshida, Tora (1993). Salt production techniques in ancient China: the Aobo tu. Translated by Vogel, Hans Ulrich. Leiden; New York: E.J. Brill. ISBN 9004096574.
