= Ziliujing, Zigong =

Ziliujing 自流井区 Tzuliutsing, Tsze-liu-tsing
- District
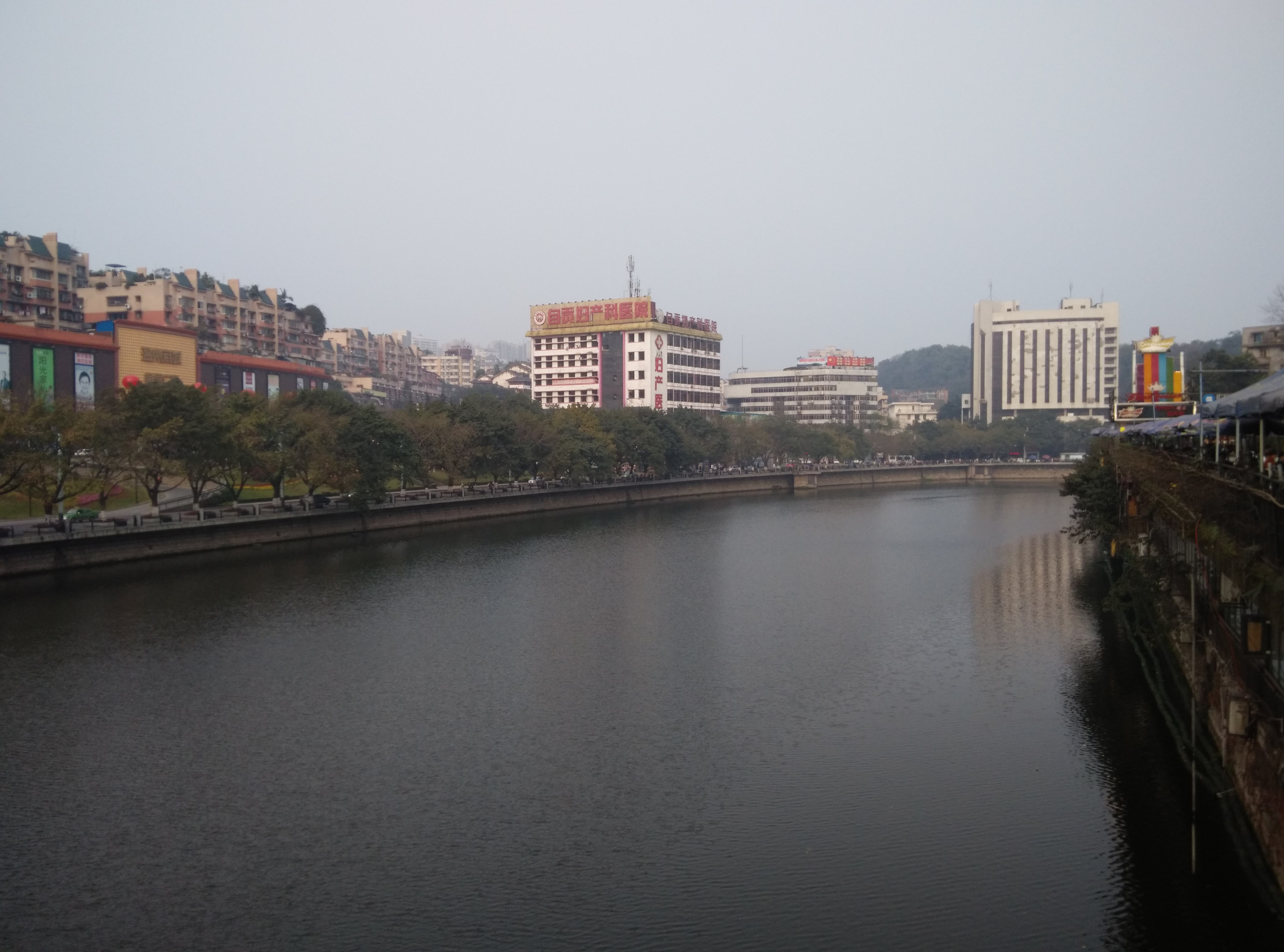

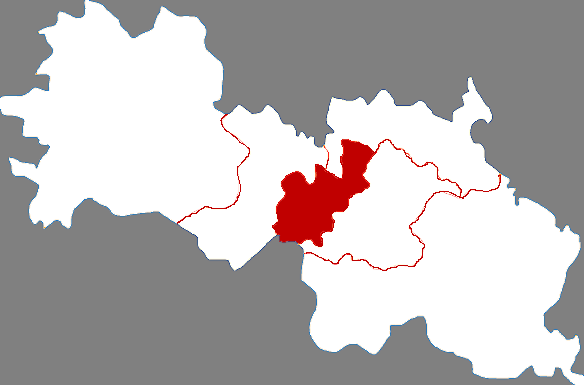
- Location in Zigong

- Location in Sichuan
- Coordinates: 29°20′15″N 104°46′38″E
- Country: China
- Province: Sichuan
- Prefecture-level city: Zigong
- District seat: Dangui Subdistrict

Area
  - Total: 153 km^{2} (59 sq mi)

Population (2020 census)
  - Total: 481,981
  - Density: 3,150/km^{2} (8,160/sq mi)
- Time zone: UTC+8 (China Standard)
- Website: www.zlj.gov.cn

Ziliujing
- Chinese: 自流井
- Postal: Tzuliutsing
- Literal meaning: Self-Flowing Well
Transcriptions
Standard Mandarin
- Hanyu Pinyin: Zìliújǐng
- Wade–Giles: Tzu^{4}-liu^{2}-ching^{3}

Ziliujing District, formerly romanized as Tzuliutsing, (Note: The name also sometimes appeared as Tsze-liu-tsing.) is a district of Zigong in Sichuan Province, China. The district covers 153 square kilometers (59 sq mi) and had a population of 330,000 people in 2005.

== History ==
According to Fang, China has always managed salt and iron, with Sichuan containing many salt deposits together with natural gas, especially in Ziliujing. "Invisible gas fire" was mentioned as early as the Han dynasty, gas wells were taxed by 1662, gas was used in one tenth of the salt evaporating plants by 1821 (the remainder using wood or charcoal), and by 1857 gas was the more common fuel. Li Jung describes the infrastructure around the salt business, "the building where money is handled is called the cashier's quarters, that immediately above the well is called the pestle quarters, that where the buffaloes turn the wheel to bring up the brine is called the wheel and buffalo quarters, that where the salt is stored in buckets is called the bucket quarters, that where the brine is evaporated is called the oven quarters. The wells used stone casing for the first hundred feet or so followed by wood for another 300 feet (91 m). An iron drill weighing up to 267 pounds (121 kg) is attached to a bamboo rope and when brine is reached, the well is called "success" or if no brine is reached by 3000 feet it is called "useless well". A well was drilled to 2,700 feet (823 m) in depth to reach the heaviest brine, the gas rising to the surface with a "rumbling noise", where the gas was contained by a wooden basin placed upside down over the well, from which protruded bamboo or wooden pipes, transporting the gas up to 1000 feet to salt evaporating boilers. Some gas wells serviced up to 700 boilers. Separate pipes carried the brine.

== Administrative divisions ==
Ziliujing District administers 9 subdistricts and 3 towns:

- Wuxingjie Subdistrict (五星街街道)
- Dongxingsi Subdistrict (东兴寺街道)
- Xinjie Subdistrict (新街街道)
- Guojia'aojie Subdistrict (郭家坳街街道)
- Dangui Subdistrict (丹桂街道)
- Xueyuan Subdistrict (学苑街道)
- Shuping Subdistrict (舒坪街道)
- Hongqi Subdistrict (红旗街道)
- Gaofeng Subdistrict (高峰街道)
- Zhongquan Town (仲权镇)
- Rongbian Town (荣边镇)
- Feilongxia Town (飞龙峡镇)

== Gallery ==
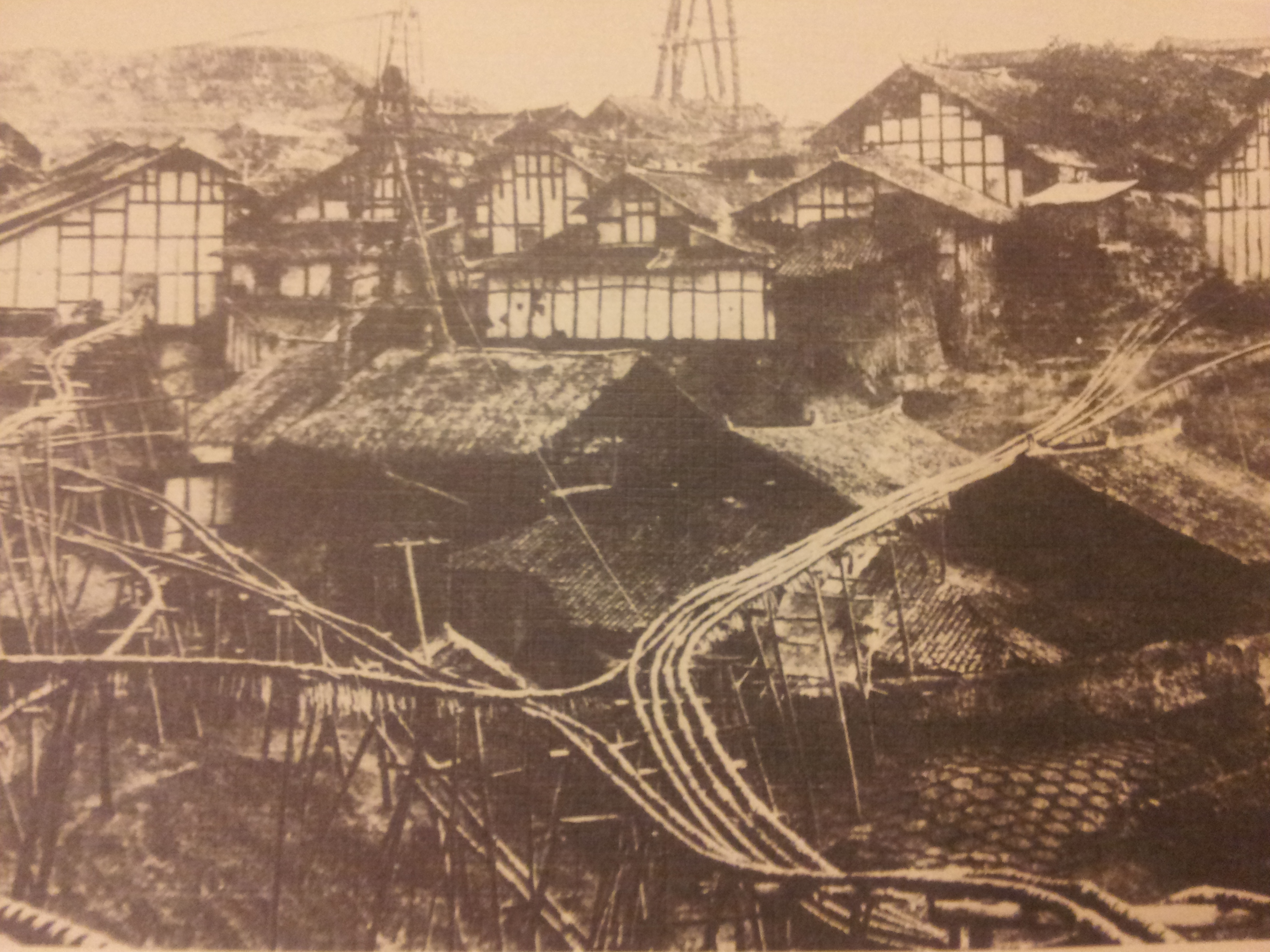

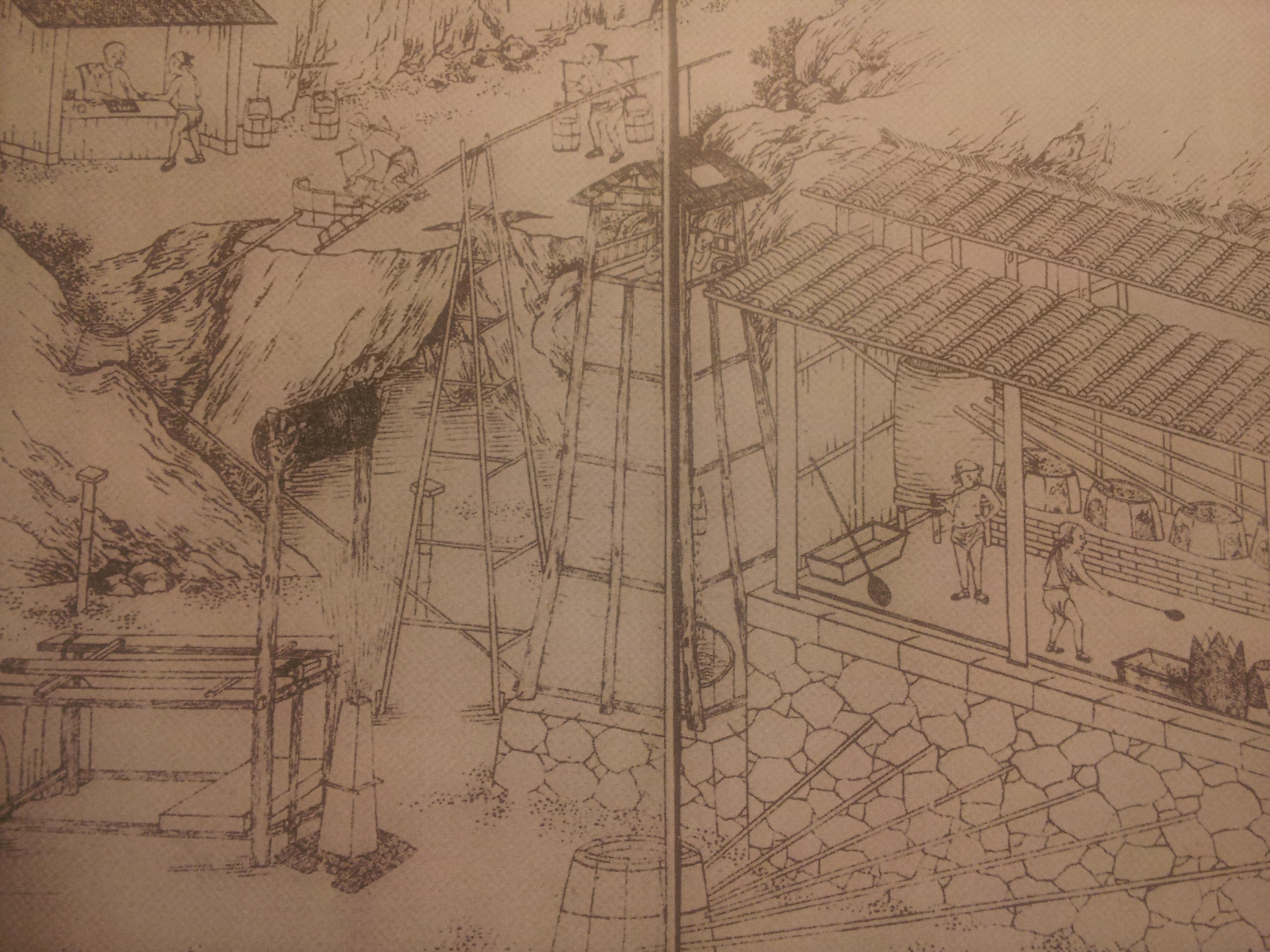
Salt evaporation in Sichuan, 1882

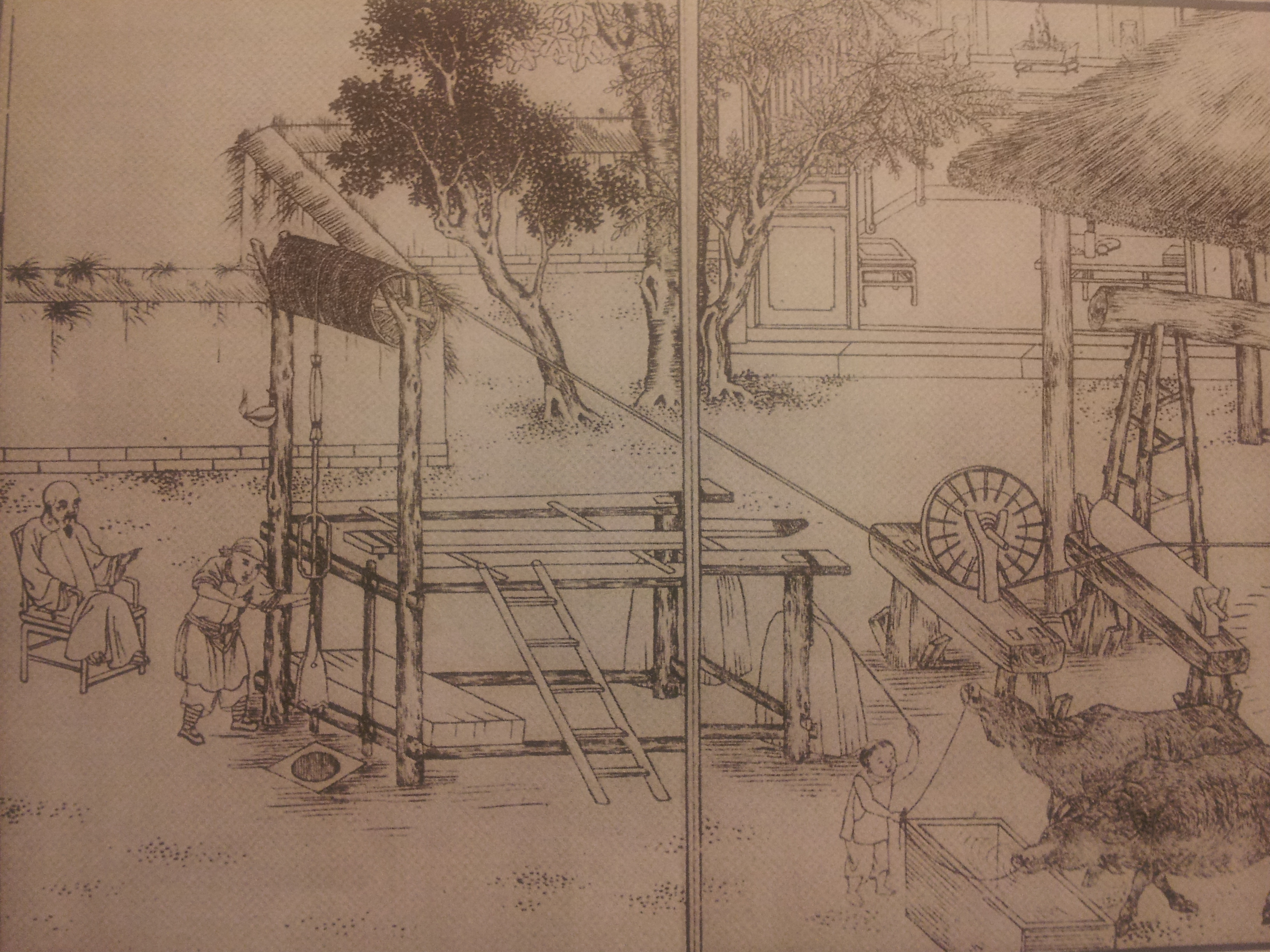
Drilling a well in Sichuan, 1882

== See also ==
- Zigong
- Salt in Chinese history
