= Fushun County, Sichuan =

Fushun County 富顺县
- County
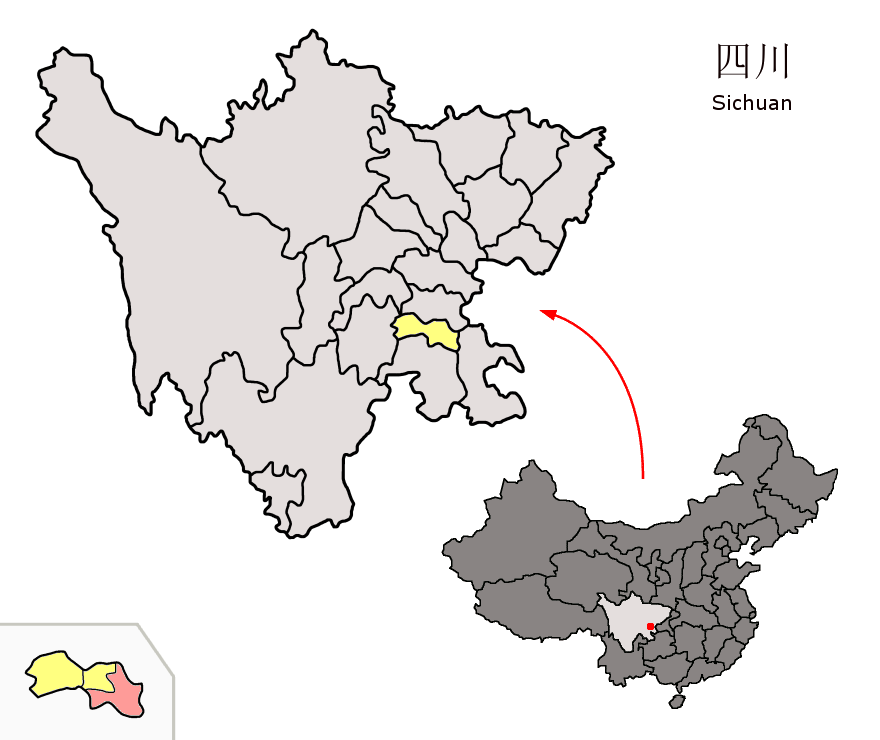
- Location of Fushun County (red) within Zigong City (yellow) and Sichuan

- Location of the seat in Sichuan
- Coordinates: 29°10′52″N 104°58′30″E
- Country: China
- Province: Sichuan
- Prefecture-level city: Zigong
- County seat: Fushi Subdistrict

Area
  - Total: 1,336.26 km^{2} (515.93 sq mi)

Population (2020)
  - Total: 722,073
  - Density: 540.369/km^{2} (1,399.55/sq mi)
- Time zone: UTC+8 (China Standard)

Fushun County (simplified Chinese: 富顺县; traditional Chinese: 富順縣; pinyin: Fùshùn Xiàn) is a county in the south-central part of Sichuan Province, China. It is the easternmost county-level division of prefecture-level city of Zigong.

== History ==
Fushun has a history over 1400 years. The county was built in 567 BC during the Southern and Northern Dynasties of China.

== Geography ==
The county has a total area of 1,603 km^{2} (619 sq mi).

== Cuisine ==
Fushun Douhua: Fushun Douhua has a long-standing reputation for its "snow-white, soft, delicate, and fragrant" characteristics. The most essential part is the dipping sauce, which is usually made with special fermented broad bean paste, chili oil, soy sauce, and MSG. Dipping the douhua in the sauce makes it salty, spicy, and savory.

== Administrative divisions ==
Fushun administers 3 subdistricts, 16 towns and 1 township:

subdistricts

- Fushi 富世街道
- Dengjingguan 邓井关街道
- Donghu 东湖街道

towns

- Pipa 琵琶镇
- Shishi 狮市镇
- Qilong 骑龙镇
- Daisi 代寺镇
- Tongsi 童寺镇
- Gufo 古佛镇
- Yongnian 永年镇
- Doushan 兜山镇
- Banqiao 板桥镇
- Fushan 福善镇
- Liqiao 李桥镇
- Zhaohua 赵化镇
- Anxi 安溪镇
- Feilong 飞龙镇
- Huaide 怀德镇
- Changtan 长滩镇

township

- Longwan 龙万乡

== Population ==
In 2006, the county had a population of 1,034,600.

== Climate ==
Climate data for Fushun, elevation 306 m (1,004 ft), (1991–2020 normals, extremes 1981–present)
Month	Jan	Feb	Mar	Apr	May	Jun	Jul	Aug	Sep	Oct	Nov	Dec	Year
Record high °C (°F)	19.4 (66.9)	24.3 (75.7)	32.1 (89.8)	35.5 (95.9)	38.1 (100.6)	37.9 (100.2)	38.5 (101.3)	41.3 (106.3)	40.1 (104.2)	32.8 (91.0)	26.5 (79.7)	19.1 (66.4)	41.3 (106.3)
Mean daily maximum °C (°F)	10.4 (50.7)	13.7 (56.7)	18.7 (65.7)	24.2 (75.6)	27.6 (81.7)	29.3 (84.7)	32.2 (90.0)	32.3 (90.1)	27.3 (81.1)	21.7 (71.1)	17.3 (63.1)	11.6 (52.9)	22.2 (72.0)
Daily mean °C (°F)	7.8 (46.0)	10.3 (50.5)	14.5 (58.1)	19.5 (67.1)	22.9 (73.2)	25.0 (77.0)	27.5 (81.5)	27.4 (81.3)	23.4 (74.1)	18.6 (65.5)	14.3 (57.7)	9.2 (48.6)	18.4 (65.1)
Mean daily minimum °C (°F)	5.9 (42.6)	8.1 (46.6)	11.6 (52.9)	16.1 (61.0)	19.5 (67.1)	22.0 (71.6)	24.2 (75.6)	24.0 (75.2)	20.8 (69.4)	16.6 (61.9)	12.3 (54.1)	7.6 (45.7)	15.7 (60.3)
Record low °C (°F)	−1.6 (29.1)	0.4 (32.7)	0.7 (33.3)	7.2 (45.0)	10.7 (51.3)	15.2 (59.4)	17.9 (64.2)	17.9 (64.2)	14.6 (58.3)	5.7 (42.3)	3.1 (37.6)	−1.7 (28.9)	−1.7 (28.9)
Average precipitation mm (inches)	16.9 (0.67)	17.3 (0.68)	35.9 (1.41)	64.0 (2.52)	93.6 (3.69)	178.4 (7.02)	184.9 (7.28)	155.8 (6.13)	126.4 (4.98)	65.0 (2.56)	28.2 (1.11)	16.2 (0.64)	982.6 (38.69)
Average precipitation days (≥ 0.1 mm)	10.3	8.7	10.8	12.8	13.9	16.9	13.3	12.1	14.8	16.7	10.1	10.5	150.9
Average snowy days	0.3	0	0	0	0	0	0	0	0	0	0	0.1	0.4
Average relative humidity (%)	84	80	76	74	74	81	80	78	83	86	84	85	80
Mean monthly sunshine hours	35.3	53.3	93.7	126.1	129.0	108.8	165.2	166.9	92.9	52.8	49.1	29.7	1,102.8
Percentage possible sunshine	11	17	25	33	31	26	39	41	25	15	15	9	24
Source: China Meteorological Administration all-time extreme temperature all-time January high

== See also ==
- Zigong
