= Qingjian County =

Coordinates: 37°12′39″N 110°14′01″E

Qingjian County 清涧县 Tsingkien
- County
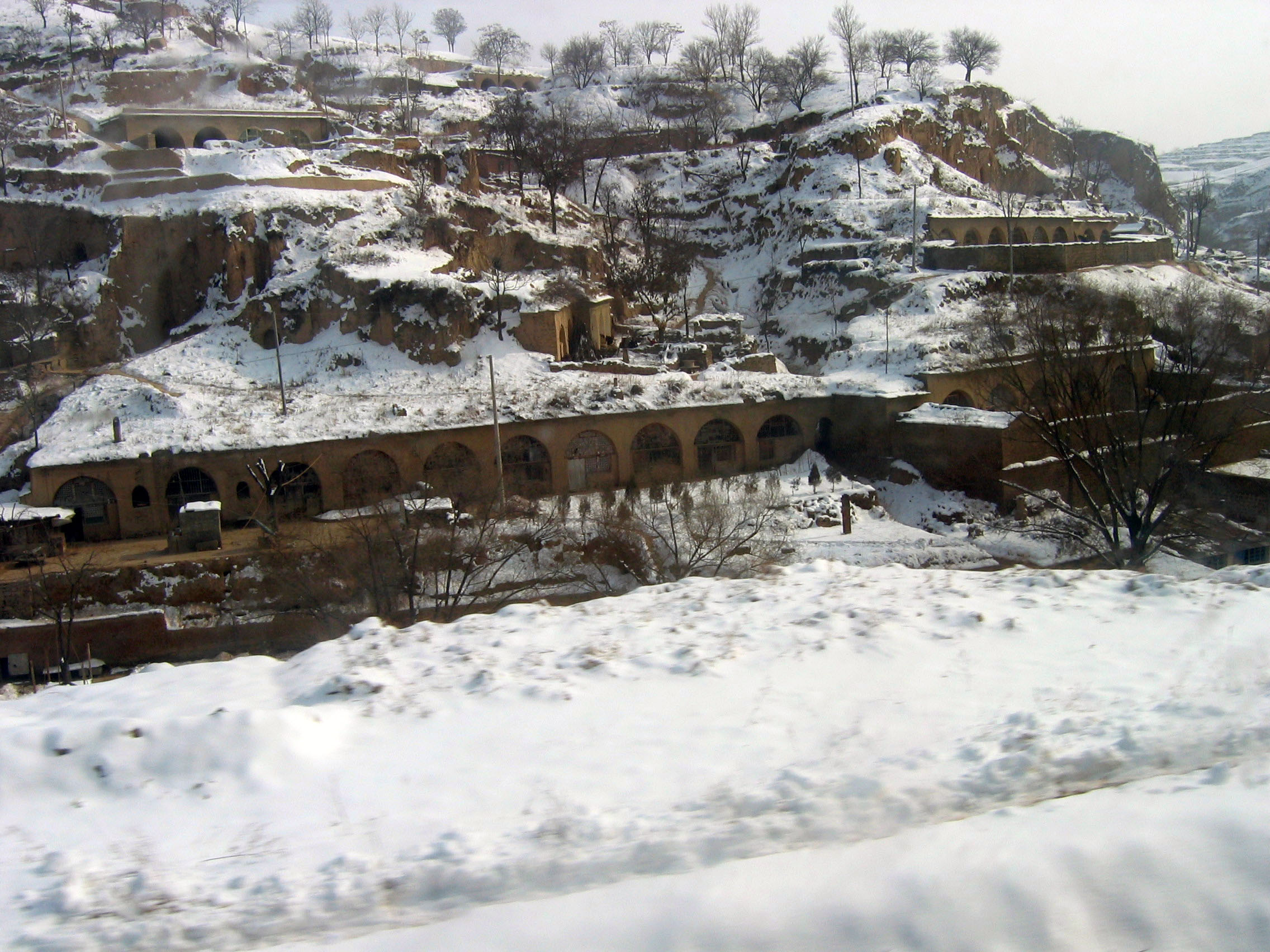
- Yaodong covered in snow in Qingjian County

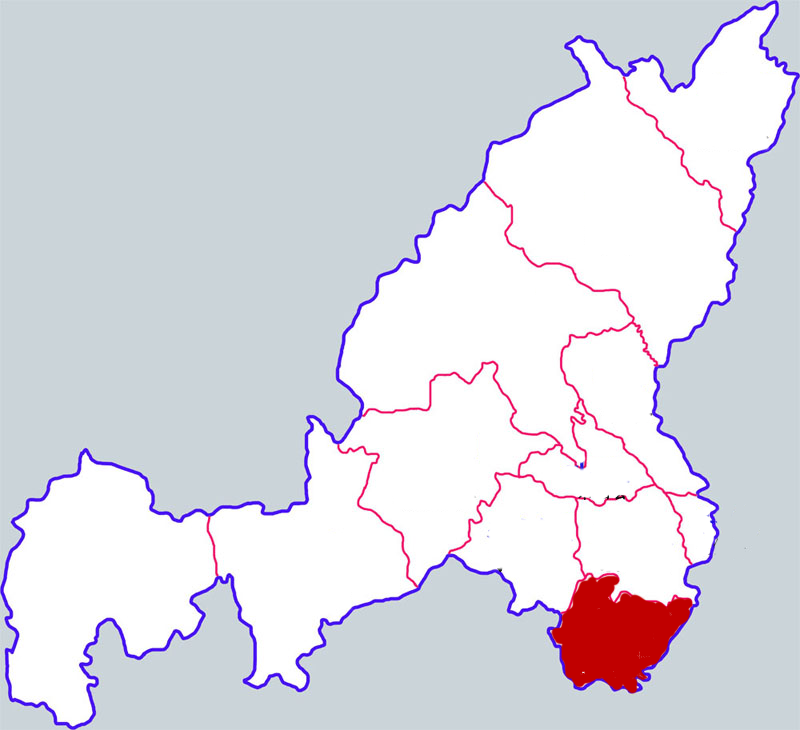
- Qingjian in Yulin

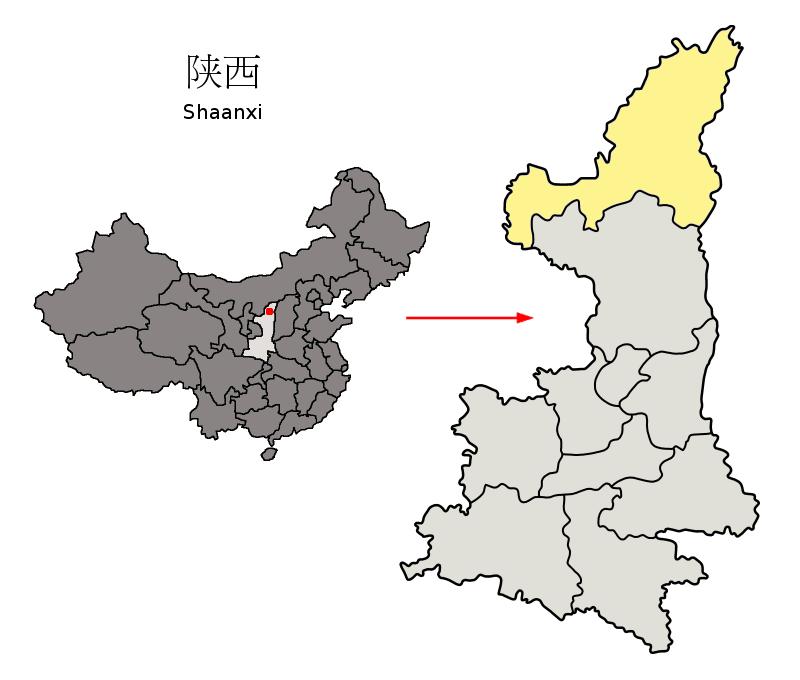
- Yulin in Shaanxi
- Country: People's Republic of China
- Province: Shaanxi
- Prefecture-level city: Yulin

Area
  - Total: 1,881 km^{2} (726 sq mi)

Population (2021)
  - Total: 210,000
  - Density: 110/km^{2} (290/sq mi)
- Time zone: UTC+8 (China standard time)
- Postal code: 718300
- Licence plates: 陕K

Qingjian County (simplified Chinese: 清涧县; traditional Chinese: 清澗縣; pinyin: Qīngjiàn Xiàn; lit. 'Clear Stream County') is a county in Yulin, in the north of Shaanxi province, China, bordering Shanxi province across the Yellow River to the east. It is under the administration of the prefecture-level city of Yulin. It spans an area of 1,881 square kilometres (726 mi^{2}), and has a population of about 210,000 as of 2021.

== Toponymy ==
The area was named "Qingjian" (simplified Chinese: 清涧; traditional Chinese: 清澗; pinyin: Qīngjiàn; lit. 'Clear Stream') by Emperor Renzong of the Song dynasty.

== History ==
The area of present-day Qingjian County has been inhabited since the Neolithic era. The county was once part of the Yangshao culture, and later, the Longshan culture. The area was subsequently inhabited by the Guifang.

The county seat, Kuanzhou, was established during the Tang dynasty. Other nearby settlements were established during the Song dynasty.

In October 1927, the Qingjian uprising, led by the Communist Party, took place in the county.

== Geography ==
Qingjian County is located in the south of Yulin, in the north of Shaanxi province, and spans an area of 1,881 square kilometres (726 mi^{2}). It spans 95 kilometres (59 mi) from east to west, and 55 kilometres (34 mi) from north to south. The Yellow River meets the Wuding River in the county. It is bordered by Shilou County of Shanxi province across the Yellow River to the east, by Zichang in Yan'an to the west, by Yanchuan County in Yan'an to the south, Suide County to the north, and Zizhou County to the northwest.

== Administrative divisions ==
Qingjian County administers the following nine towns:

- Kuanzhou (宽州镇)
- Shizuiyi (石咀驿镇)
- Zhejiaping (折家坪镇)
- Yujiahe (玉家河镇)
- Gaojiecun (高杰村镇)
- Lijiata (李家塔镇)
- Dianzegou (店则沟镇)
- Xiejiagou (解家沟镇)
- Xianianlipu (下廿里铺镇)

== Climate ==
Climate data for Qingjian, elevation 938 m (3,077 ft), (1991–2020 normals, extremes 1981–2010)
Month	Jan	Feb	Mar	Apr	May	Jun	Jul	Aug	Sep	Oct	Nov	Dec	Year
Record high °C (°F)	14.1 (57.4)	20.4 (68.7)	28.9 (84.0)	37.0 (98.6)	36.5 (97.7)	40.3 (104.5)	39.3 (102.7)	36.5 (97.7)	37.0 (98.6)	29.3 (84.7)	23.1 (73.6)	15.8 (60.4)	40.3 (104.5)
Mean daily maximum °C (°F)	1.6 (34.9)	6.3 (43.3)	13.2 (55.8)	20.7 (69.3)	25.8 (78.4)	29.8 (85.6)	30.7 (87.3)	28.4 (83.1)	23.4 (74.1)	17.4 (63.3)	10.0 (50.0)	3.1 (37.6)	17.5 (63.6)
Daily mean °C (°F)	−6.3 (20.7)	−1.6 (29.1)	5.2 (41.4)	12.6 (54.7)	18.2 (64.8)	22.6 (72.7)	24.3 (75.7)	22.2 (72.0)	16.7 (62.1)	9.8 (49.6)	2.3 (36.1)	−4.5 (23.9)	10.1 (50.2)
Mean daily minimum °C (°F)	−12.0 (10.4)	−7.5 (18.5)	−1.2 (29.8)	5.4 (41.7)	10.7 (51.3)	15.6 (60.1)	18.7 (65.7)	17.4 (63.3)	11.9 (53.4)	4.5 (40.1)	−2.8 (27.0)	−9.6 (14.7)	4.3 (39.7)
Record low °C (°F)	−25.0 (−13.0)	−19.6 (−3.3)	−15.6 (3.9)	−6.2 (20.8)	0.1 (32.2)	7.1 (44.8)	11.4 (52.5)	8.7 (47.7)	−1.4 (29.5)	−8.1 (17.4)	−21.3 (−6.3)	−24.5 (−12.1)	−25.0 (−13.0)
Average precipitation mm (inches)	4.4 (0.17)	6.3 (0.25)	12.4 (0.49)	26.8 (1.06)	37.7 (1.48)	57.3 (2.26)	101.7 (4.00)	119.4 (4.70)	76.6 (3.02)	35.4 (1.39)	16.9 (0.67)	2.7 (0.11)	497.6 (19.6)
Average precipitation days (≥ 0.1 mm)	2.7	2.9	4.1	5.7	7.0	8.9	11.6	11.4	9.8	7.3	4.2	1.9	77.5
Average snowy days	3.5	3.2	1.9	0.3	0	0	0	0	0	0.3	1.9	2.6	13.7
Average relative humidity (%)	56	52	48	45	47	54	66	73	75	72	65	58	59
Mean monthly sunshine hours	196.2	183.9	220.7	240.9	266.0	251.5	236.4	219.2	188.8	195.4	188.3	198.3	2,585.6
Percentage possible sunshine	63	60	59	61	60	57	53	53	51	57	62	67	59
Source: China Meteorological Administration

== Demographics ==
Qingjian County has a population of approximately 210,000 as of 2021. Urban residents of the county experience a per capita disposable income of 31,608 renminbi (RMB), while rural residents have a per capita disposable income of 12,689 RMB.

== Economy ==
As of 2021, Qingjian County has a gross domestic product (GDP) of 6.965 billion renminbi (RMB). Retail sales in Qingjian County totaled 1.757 billion RMB in 2021. Major agricultural products grown in Qingjian County include jujubes and apples.

== Transportation ==
- China National Highway 210
- G6511 Ansai–Qingjian Expressway
- Shenmu–Yan'an Railway

== Notable people ==
- Bai Dongcai, a politician
- Bai Enpei, a politician
- Bai Rubing, a politician
- Bai Zhimin, a politician
- Wang Weiguo, a writer
