= China National Highway 307 =

Road in China

National Highway 307
- 307国道

Route information
- Length: 1,351 km (839 mi)

Major junctions
- From: Qikou, Hebei
- To: Yinchuan, Ningxia

Location
- Country: China

Highway system
- National Trunk Highway System; Primary; Auxiliary
← G306	→ G308

China National Highway 307 (G307) runs west from Qikou, Hebei towards Shanxi Province, Shaanxi Province, and ends in Yinchuan, Ningxia. It is 1,351 kilometres in length.

== Route and distance ==
Route and distance

City	Distance (km)
Qikou, Hebei	0
Huanghua, Hebei	49
Cangzhou, Hebei	96
Xian County, Hebei	176
Wuqiang, Hebei	201
Shenzhou City, Hebei	243
Jinzhou, Hebei	291
Gaocheng, Hebei	309
Shijiazhuang, Hebei	342
Luquan, Hebei	358
Jingxing, Hebei	380
Pingding, Shanxi	443
Yangquan, Shanxi	447
Shouyang, Shanxi	483
Taiyuan, Shanxi	557
Jinyuan District, Shanxi	576
Qingxu, Shanxi	593
Jiaocheng, Shanxi	609
Wenshui, Shanxi	628
Fenyang, Shanxi	657
Lishi, Shanxi	738
Liulin, Shanxi	765
Wubao, Shaanxi	785
Suide, Shaanxi	847
Zizhou, Shaanxi	876
Jingbian, Shaanxi	1025
Dingbian, Shaanxi	1148
Yanchi, Ningxia	1179
Lingwu, Ningxia	1291
Yongning County, Ningxia	1331
Yinchuan, Ningxia	1351

== See also ==
- China National Highways
