= Shenmu–Yan'an railway =

Railway line in Shaanxi, China

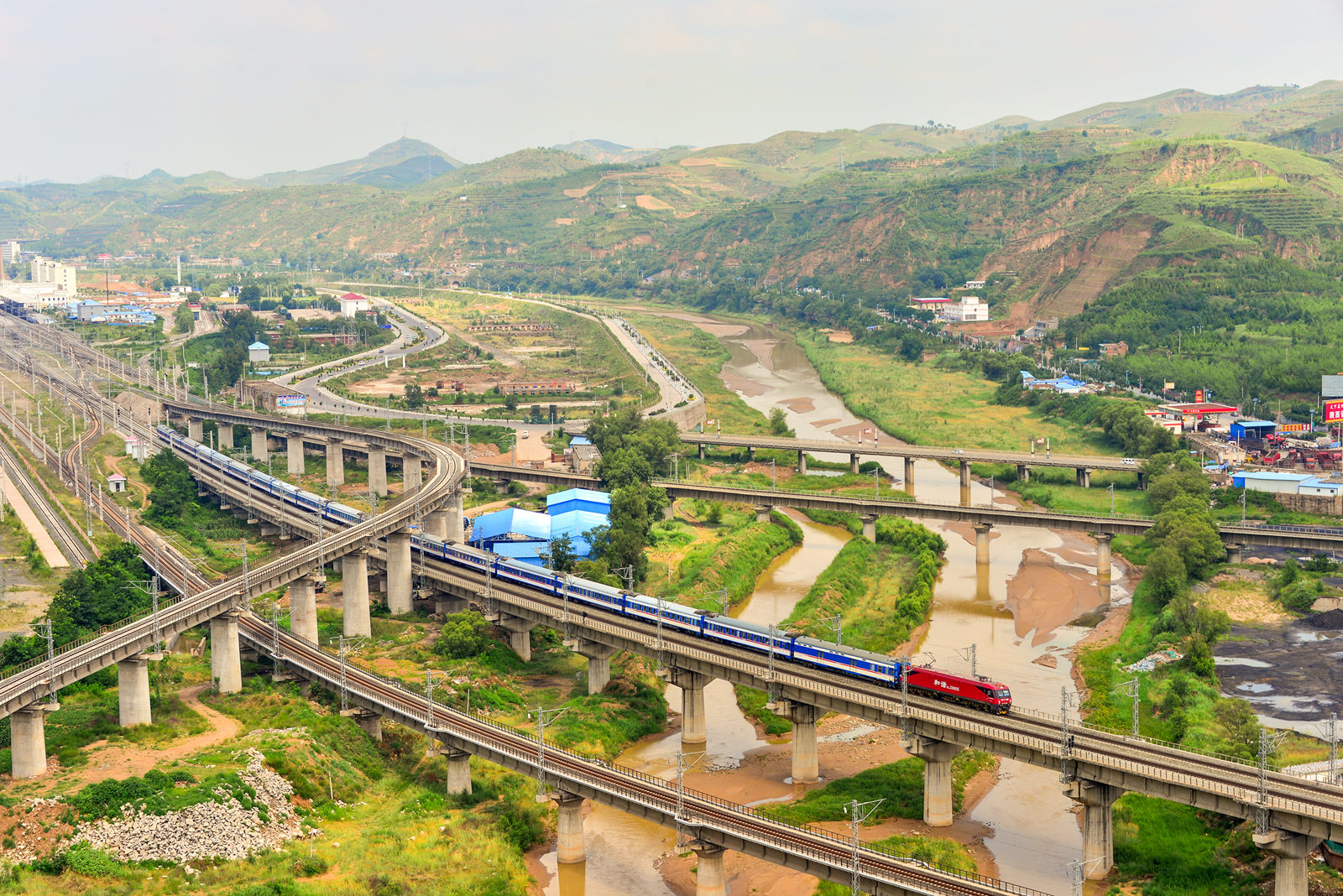
The Shenmu–Yan'an railway along the Wuding River in Suide, Shaanxi Province at the junction with the Taiyuan–Zhongwei–Yinchuan railway

The Shenmu–Yan'an railway, or Shenyan railway (simplified Chinese: 神延铁路; traditional Chinese: 神延鐵路; pinyin: shényán tiělù), is a railroad in Shaanxi Province of China between Shenmu and Yan'an. The line is 382.4 km (238 mi) long and was built completed in 2001. Major cities and towns along route include Shenmu, Yulin, Hengshan, Mizhi, Suide, Zizhou, Qingjian, Zichang County, Baota, and Yan'an.

The Shenyan line forms part of the Baotou–Liuzhou rail corridor and was built with partial financing through a $200 million development assistance loan from the Asia Development Bank.

== Rail connections ==
- Suide: Taiyuan–Zhongwei–Yinchuan railway
- Yan'an: Xi'an–Yan'an railway

== See also ==
- List of railways in China
