= Yulin, Shaanxi =

Yulin 榆林市
- Prefecture-level city
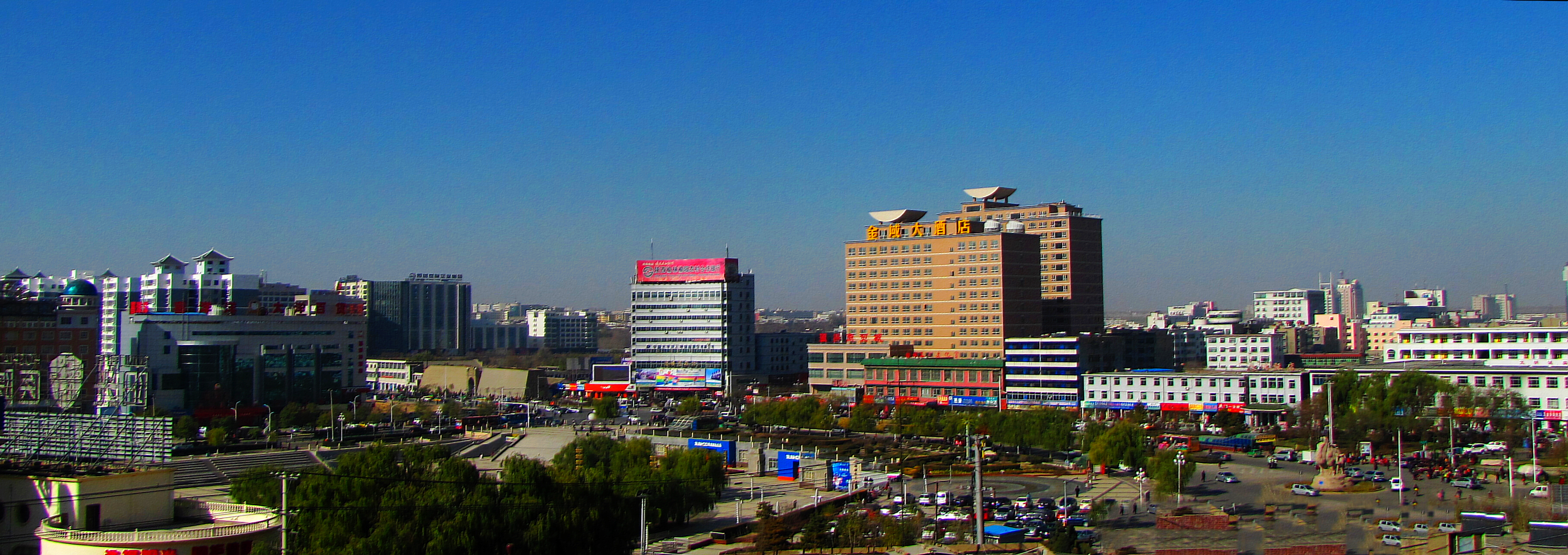
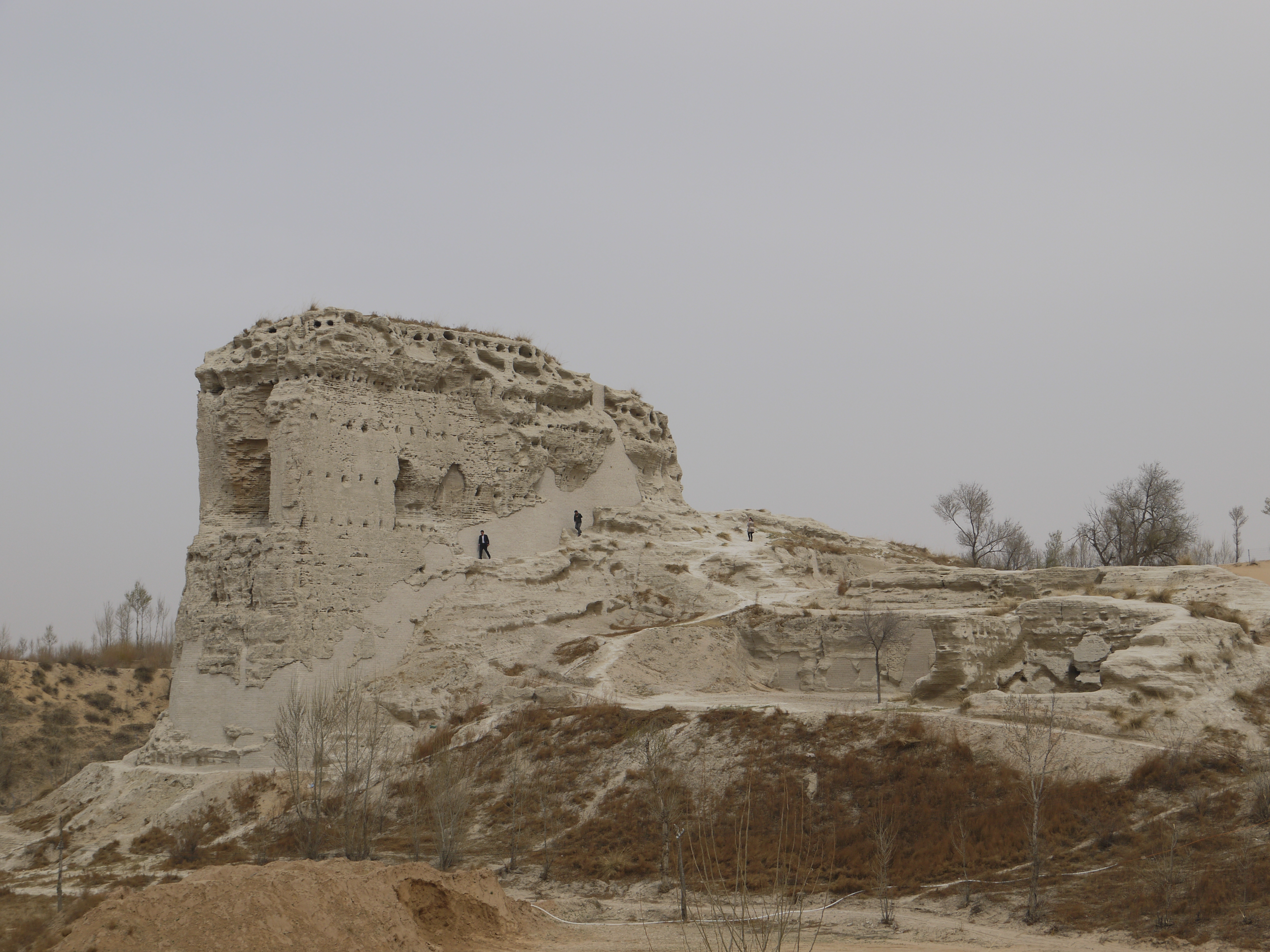
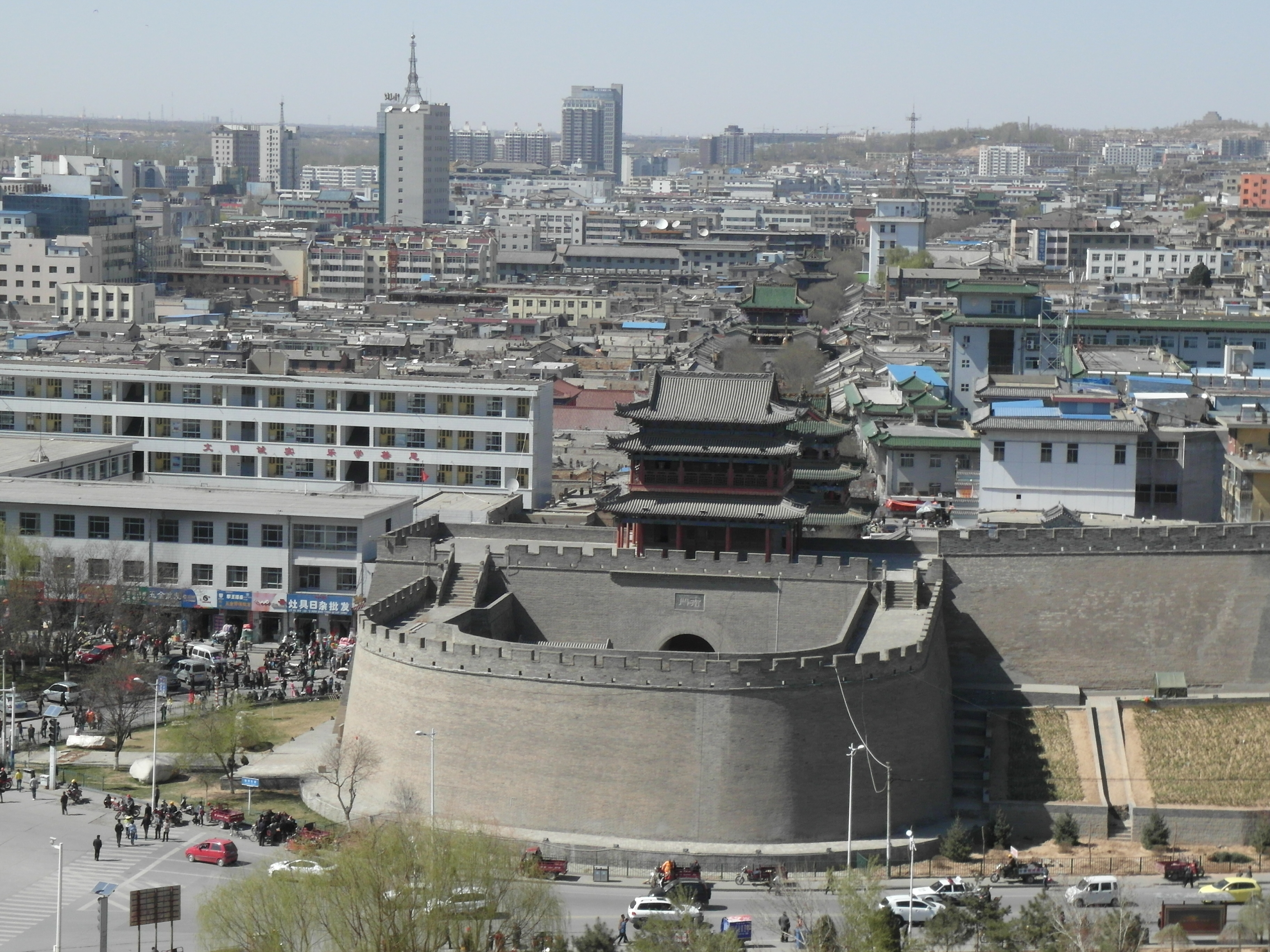
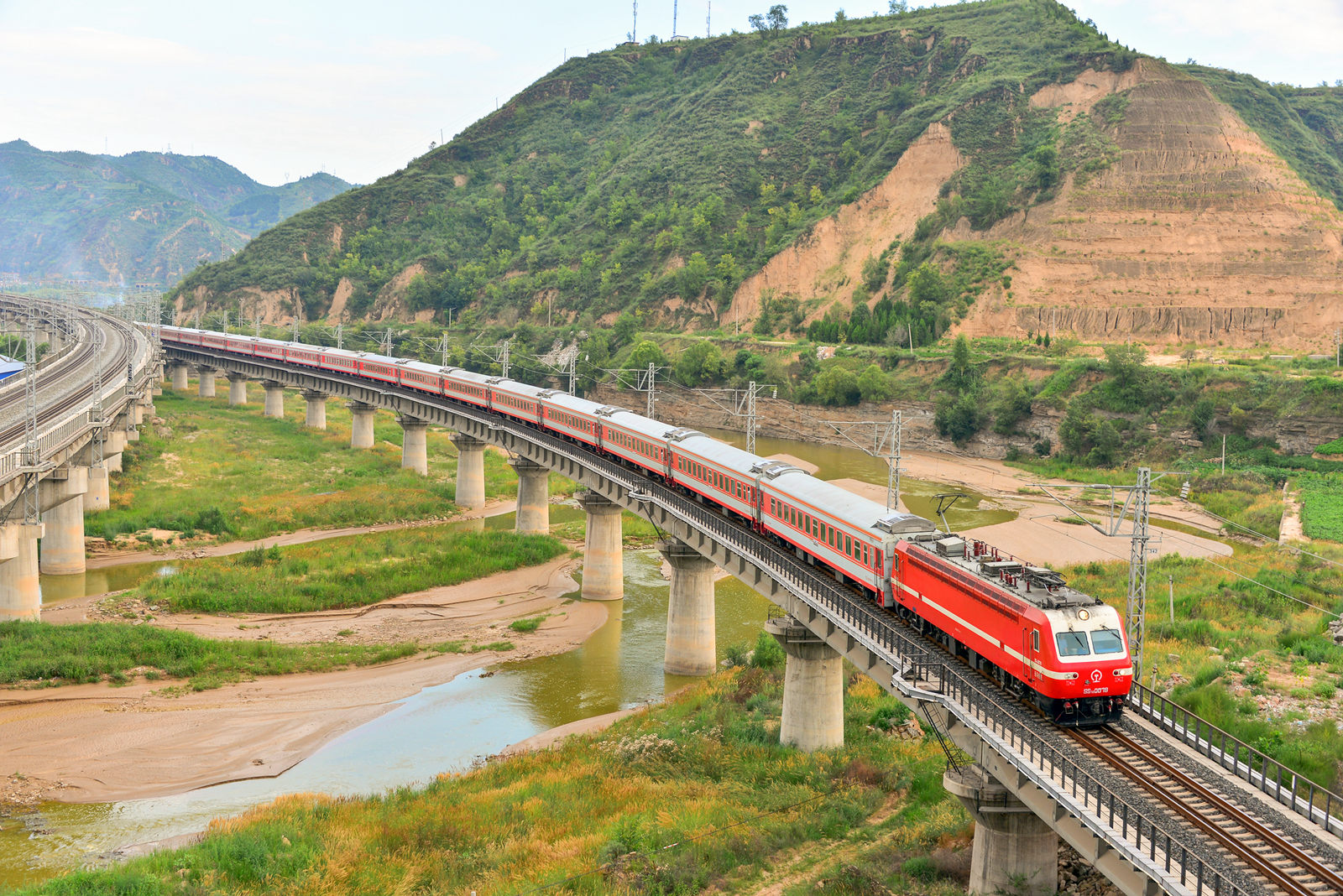
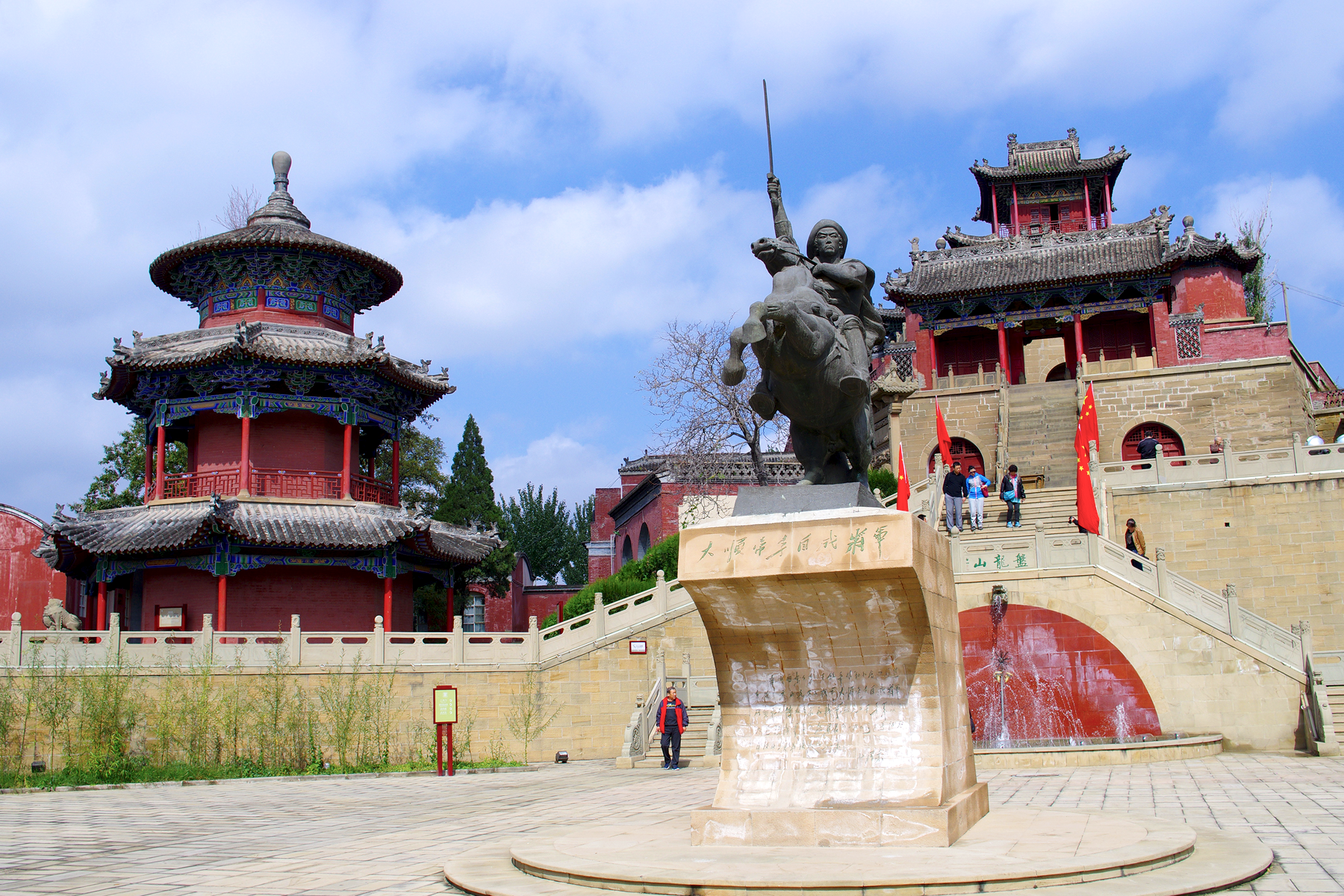
- Downtown Yuyang District Ruins of Tongwancheng Yulin Old City Wall Baotou–Xi'an railway in Suide County Temporary Palace of Li Zicheng in Mizhi County

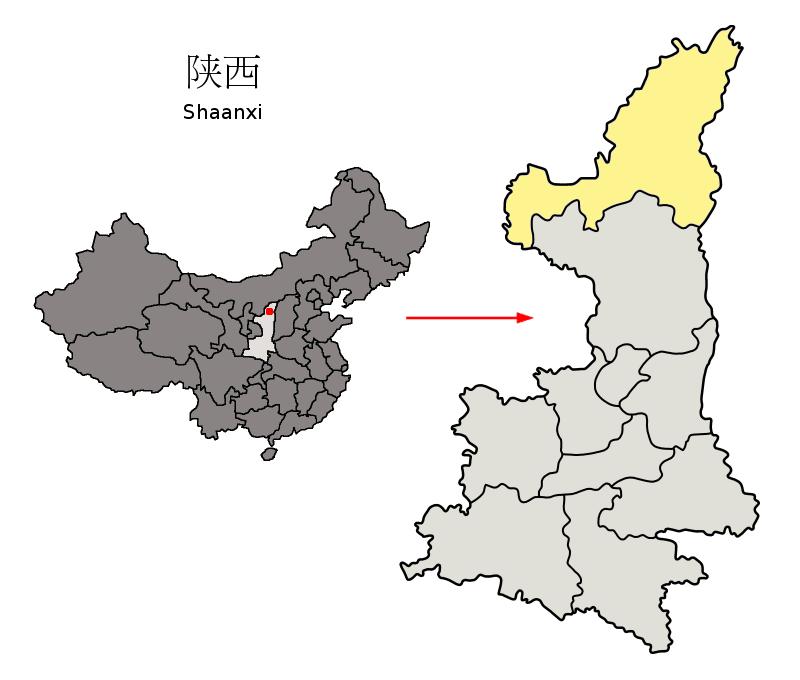
- Location of Yulin City jurisdiction in Shaanxi
- Coordinates (Yulin municipal government): 38°17′09″N 109°44′03″E
- Country: People's Republic of China
- Province: Shaanxi
- Municipal seat: Yuyang District

Area
  - Total: 43,578 km^{2} (16,826 sq mi)
- Elevation: 1,084 m (3,556 ft)

Population (2020)
  - Total: 3,634,750
  - Density: 83.408/km^{2} (216.03/sq mi)

GDP
  - Total: CN¥ 754.868 billion (US$ 105.995 billion)
  - Per capita: CN¥ 208,752; US$ 29,353
- Time zone: UTC+08:00 (China Standard)
- ISO 3166 code: CN-SN-08
- Licence plates: 陕K
- Website: yl.gov.cn

Yulin (Chinese: 榆林; pinyin: Yúlín) is a prefecture-level city in the Shaanbei region of Shaanxi province, China, bordering Inner Mongolia to the north, Shanxi to the east, and Ningxia to the west. It has an administrative area of 43,578 km^{2} (16,826 sq mi) and as of the 2020 Chinese census had a population of 3,634,750.

== History ==
Yulin hosted the 11th CHIME (European Foundation for Chinese Music Research) conference in August 2006. From 26 to 29 August 2017, the 1st IGU-AGLE Commission's conference on "Global Rural Development and Land Capacity Building" was held in Yulin University.

== Geography ==
Yulin is the northernmost prefecture-level city of Shaanxi, and borders Ordos City (Inner Mongolia) to the north, Xinzhou and Lüliang (Shanxi) to the east, Yan'an to the south, and Wuzhong (Ningxia) to the west. To the north and northwest of the city lies the Ordos Desert, though the countryside is very green due to the many small shrubs which have been planted to slow the process of desertification. The city is based in a valley which extends north–south, which rises to a large vantage point to the north east, from which there are views of the west and northwest.

=== Lake Hongjiannao ===
Lake Hongjiannao lies on the border of Yulin and Ordos City, Inner Mongolia (39°06′N, 109°53′E). It is China's largest "desert freshwater lake". The lake is relatively recent, formed around 1929 due to increased rainfall in the early 20th century; before, the basin was a wetland.

The lake is supplied by four rivers, but there is no outflow. When its surface area was about 60 km^{2} (23 sq mi), its maximum depth was 10.5 m (34 ft) and the average depth 8.2 m (27 ft). However, the lake has been shrinking sharply over the past decade, to 32 km^{2} (12 sq mi) at the present. The shrinking has been attributed to reservoir construction, mining, and agricultural irrigation.

Lake Hongjiannao is an important breeding habitat for relict gull, a species classified as "vulnerable" by the International Union for Conservation of Nature (IUCN). It is estimated that up to 5,000 pairs breed there, making it the largest breeding colony of relict gulls. Shrinking of the lake and changes in water quality are threatening the colony.

== Climate ==
Yulin has a continental, monsoon-influenced semi-arid climate (Köppen BSk), with very cold, rather long winters, hot and somewhat humid summers. At a similar latitude and altitude as Kayseri, Turkey, Yulin is yet considerably colder, especially in winter. Monthly averages range from −8.0 °C (17.6 °F) in January to 23.8 °C (74.8 °F) in July, and the annual mean is 9.3 °C (48.7 °F). Spring is especially prone to sandstorms blowing in from the northwest. There is only 433.4 mm (17.06 in) of precipitation annually, 75% of which occurs from June to September. Due to the aridity, diurnal temperature variation is large for most of the year, averaging 12.7 °C (22.9 °F) annually. With monthly percent possible sunshine ranging from 56% in July and August to 66% in November, the city receives 2,716.5 hours of bright sunshine annually.

Climate data for Yulin, elevation 1,157 m (3,796 ft), (1991–2020 normals, extremes 1951–present)
Month	Jan	Feb	Mar	Apr	May	Jun	Jul	Aug	Sep	Oct	Nov	Dec	Year
Record high °C (°F)	14.3 (57.7)	20.1 (68.2)	28.6 (83.5)	34.8 (94.6)	36.2 (97.2)	39.0 (102.2)	38.6 (101.5)	36.9 (98.4)	36.0 (96.8)	28.5 (83.3)	22.4 (72.3)	13.2 (55.8)	39.0 (102.2)
Mean daily maximum °C (°F)	−0.6 (30.9)	4.4 (39.9)	11.3 (52.3)	19.1 (66.4)	24.5 (76.1)	28.7 (83.7)	29.9 (85.8)	27.5 (81.5)	22.6 (72.7)	16.3 (61.3)	8.3 (46.9)	1.0 (33.8)	16.1 (60.9)
Daily mean °C (°F)	−8.0 (17.6)	−2.9 (26.8)	4.2 (39.6)	11.7 (53.1)	17.6 (63.7)	22.1 (71.8)	23.8 (74.8)	21.6 (70.9)	16.3 (61.3)	9.5 (49.1)	1.5 (34.7)	−5.9 (21.4)	9.3 (48.7)
Mean daily minimum °C (°F)	−14.2 (6.4)	−9.1 (15.6)	−2.0 (28.4)	4.8 (40.6)	10.7 (51.3)	15.6 (60.1)	18.2 (64.8)	16.6 (61.9)	11.2 (52.2)	3.9 (39.0)	−3.8 (25.2)	−11.5 (11.3)	3.4 (38.1)
Record low °C (°F)	−30.9 (−23.6)	−28.5 (−19.3)	−19.5 (−3.1)	−10.5 (13.1)	−2.8 (27.0)	4.7 (40.5)	10.3 (50.5)	5.4 (41.7)	−3.2 (26.2)	−10.4 (13.3)	−21.1 (−6.0)	−32.7 (−26.9)	−32.7 (−26.9)
Average precipitation mm (inches)	2.8 (0.11)	4.2 (0.17)	9.4 (0.37)	21.6 (0.85)	31.5 (1.24)	42.8 (1.69)	97.3 (3.83)	123.5 (4.86)	60.6 (2.39)	26.0 (1.02)	11.4 (0.45)	2.3 (0.09)	433.4 (17.07)
Average precipitation days (≥ 0.1 mm)	2.1	2.6	3.5	4.2	6.2	8.6	10.6	11.0	9.0	6.0	2.9	1.8	68.5
Average snowy days	3.4	3.1	1.9	0.7	0.1	0	0	0	0	0.3	1.8	2.8	14.1
Average relative humidity (%)	52	46	40	38	40	48	60	66	66	59	55	52	52
Mean monthly sunshine hours	194.4	190.3	227.6	247.1	283.6	271.4	251.4	234.8	211.2	221.0	196.1	187.6	2,716.5
Percentage possible sunshine	63	62	61	62	64	61	56	56	57	65	66	64	61
Source: China Meteorological Administrationall-time February highextremes>

== Administration ==
Yulin consists of two districts, one county-level city and nine counties.

Map
Name	Hanzi	Hanyu pinyin	Resident population (2018 data)	Area (km^{2})	Density (/km^{2})
Yuyang District	榆阳区	Yúyáng Qū	684,800	7,053	65
Hengshan District	横山区	Héngshān Qū	313,500	4,084	81
Shenmu City	神木市	Shénmù Shì	485,000	7,635	48
Fugu County	府谷县	Fǔgǔ Xiàn	271,500	3,212	65
Jingbian County	靖边县	Jìngbiān Xiàn	382,000	5,088	57
Dingbian County	定边县	Dìngbiān Xiàn	339,400	6,920	45
Suide County	绥德县	Suídé Xiàn	287,500	1,878	186
Mizhi County	米脂县	Mǐzhī Xiàn	145,400	1,212	173
Jia County	佳县	Jiā Xiàn	155,500	2,144	117
Wubu County	吴堡县	Wúbǔ Xiàn	64,600	428	187
Qingjian County	清涧县	Qīngjiàn Xiàn	124,700	1,881	112
Zizhou County	子洲县	Zǐzhōu Xiàn	163,900	2,043	152

== Economy ==
Coal mining is the main industry of Yulin. There is a new oil-field project (2005+) just to the west of Yulin which is drilling wells for natural gas, and this has brought a good deal of money into the local economy.

This new oil/gas development is the current largest onshore project cooperated by the PetroChina and International Energy Company (Shell) in Mainland of China since 1999 (Product Sharing Contract (PSC) signed). In 2005, this project progressed to the construction and drilling phase and delivered gas into Shaanxi-Jing No.2 pipeline in 2007. The target annual gas production is 3 billion cubic meters (BCM) after this project reaches its full production capacity.

== Transportation ==
- Yulin Yuyang Airport
- Shenyan Railway
- G1812 Cangyu Expressway
- G65 Baotou–Maoming Expressway
- China National Highway 210

== Culture ==
Because of its relative isolation, a considerable amount of classical architecture remains in the city proper including the original city wall, some of which has been restored. Other cultural relics include the Zhenbeitai watchtower, built during the Ming dynasty, which is the largest troop fortress built on the entire Great Wall, with original and restored pieces of the original Great Wall juxtaposed on both sides. There is a large restoration in process on this area of the Great Wall. In addition, pieces of the ancient Great Wall built during the Qin dynasty are scattered along the outskirts of town. There is also the Red Stone Gorge, a canyon lined with grottoes containing carved ancient writing and Buddhist art. The town also contains an ancient pagoda.

The Chinese dialect of Jin is spoken in Yulin.

== Notable people ==
- Liang Shidu, Sui-era rebel leader
- Han Shizhong, Southern Song general
- Li Zicheng, rebel leader, Emperor of the Shun dynasty
- Zhang Xianzhong, rebel leader, Emperor of the Xi dynasty
- Du Yuming, National Revolutionary Army lieutenant general
- Zhang Dazhi, People's Liberation Army lieutenant general
- Hu Qili, politician, former first-ranked secretary of the Secretariat of the Chinese Communist Party
- Zhang Weiying, economist, professor and writer
- Gao Zhisheng, human rights lawyer and dissident
- Yin Yuzhen, environmentalist
- Jiang Shigong, legal and political theorist, vice president of the Minzu University of China
- Yang Qian, Chinese-Australian table tennis player

== Sister cities ==
After the mayor of Gillette, Wyoming visited a coal conference in China, a delegation from Yulin went to Gillette. These meetings eventually led both to become sister cities in 2012.
