= Qikou =

Qikou may refer to:

- Qikou, Liaoning (旗口镇), a town of Dashiqiao City, Liaoning, China
- Qikou, Lin County, Shanxi (碛口镇), a town in Lin County, Shanxi, China
- Qikou, Huanghua (歧口村), a village of Nanpaihe Town (南排河镇), Huanghua City, Hebei, China
