= Jingbian County =

Jingbian County 靖边县 Tsingpien
- County
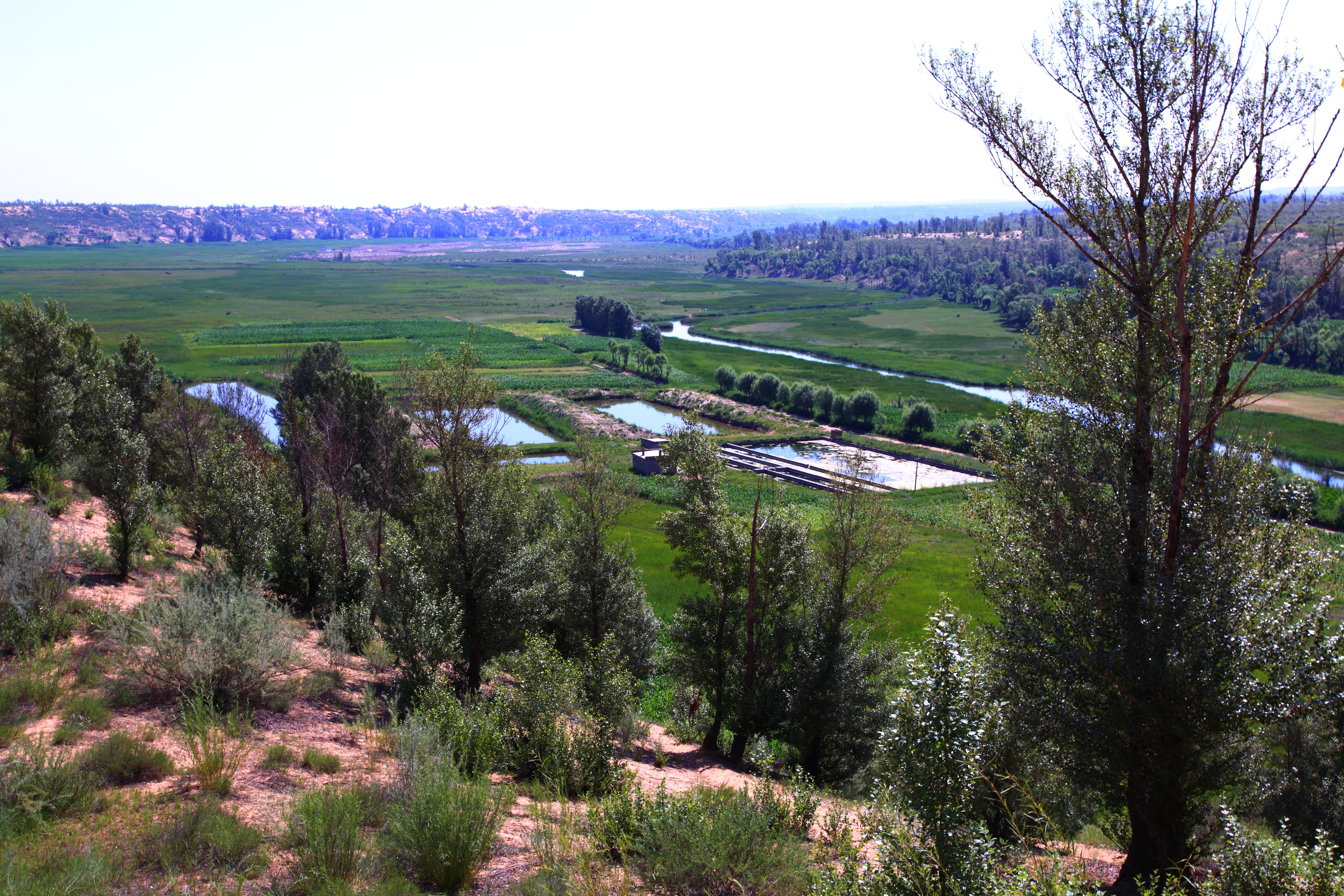

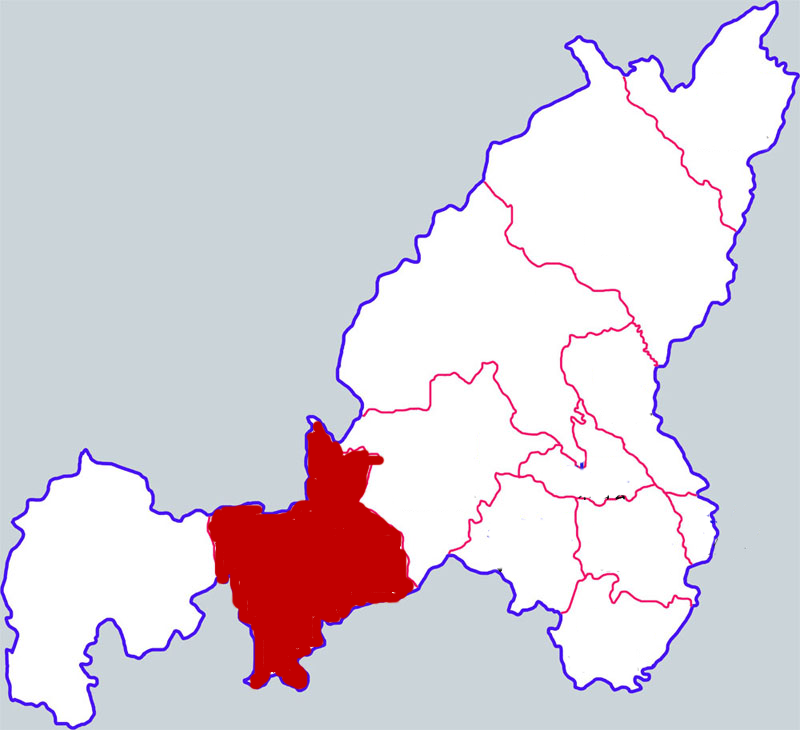
- Jingbian in Yulin

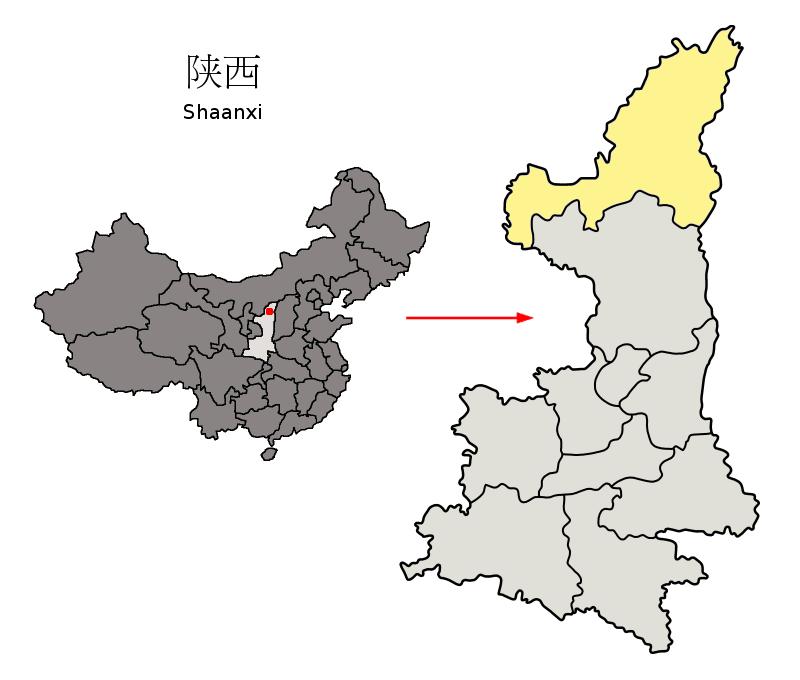
- Yulin in Shaanxi
- Coordinates: 37°35′33″N 108°48′1″E
- Country: People's Republic of China
- Province: Shaanxi
- Prefecture-level city: Yulin

Area
  - Total: 4,975 km^{2} (1,921 sq mi)
- Elevation: 1,339 m (4,393 ft)

Population (2020)
  - Total: 384,100
  - Density: 77.21/km^{2} (200.0/sq mi)
- Time zone: UTC+8 (China Standard)
- Postal code: 718500
- Website: www.jingbian.gov.cn

Jingbian County (simplified Chinese: 靖边县; traditional Chinese: 靖邊縣; pinyin: Jìngbiān Xiàn) is a county under the administration of Yulin City, in the northwest of Shaanxi Province, China, bordering Inner Mongolia to the north and northwest and flanked in the north by the Mu Us Desert. It has a land area of 4,975 km^{2} (1,921 sq mi), and a population of 384,100 in 2020.

== History ==
The county was first established as Bian County in 1731, although the area has been inhabited since the Paleolithic era. Ruins of the 5th century Hun capital Tongwancheng can be found in the county.

== Culture ==
The county is known for its paper-cutting art and Xintianyou folk music and its culture is described as a mix between Chinese and Mongolian.

== Economy ==
A large gas field is located in Jingbian, and it is a hub of the West–East Gas Pipeline network. There are also significant coal and rock salt reserves.

== Administrative divisions ==
As of 2019, Jingbian County is in charge of one subdistrict and sixteen towns.

Subdistricts

- Zhangjiapan Subdistrict (张家畔街道) - upgraded from a town

Towns

- Ningtiaoliang (宁条梁镇)
- Qingyangcha (青阳岔镇)
- Dongkeng (东坑镇)
- Hongdunjie (红墩界镇)
- Yangqiaopan (杨桥畔镇)
- Zhouhe (周河镇)
- Wangquze (王渠则镇)
- Zhongshanjian (中山涧镇)

The following towns have been upgraded from townships:

- Yangmijian (杨米涧镇)
- Tianciwan (天赐湾镇)
- Xiaohe (小河镇)
- Longzhou (龙洲镇)
- Haizetan (海则滩镇)
- Ximawan (席麻湾镇)
- Zhenjing (镇靖镇)

The following towns have been newly established:

- Huanghaojie (黄蒿界镇)

The following former townships have been merged into other administrative divisions:

- Gaojiagou Township (高家沟乡)
- Qiaogouwan Township (乔沟湾乡)
- Dalugou Township (大路沟乡)
- Wuliwan Township (五里湾乡)
- Xincheng Township (新塍乡)
- Huanggoujie Township (黄蒿界乡)

== Climate ==
Climate data for Jingbian, elevation 1,337 m (4,386 ft), (1991–2020 normals, extremes 1981–2010)
Month	Jan	Feb	Mar	Apr	May	Jun	Jul	Aug	Sep	Oct	Nov	Dec	Year
Record high °C (°F)	16.8 (62.2)	21.0 (69.8)	27.6 (81.7)	33.4 (92.1)	35.0 (95.0)	36.2 (97.2)	36.4 (97.5)	34.2 (93.6)	33.9 (93.0)	28.0 (82.4)	23.0 (73.4)	17.8 (64.0)	36.4 (97.5)
Mean daily maximum °C (°F)	0.1 (32.2)	4.4 (39.9)	11.0 (51.8)	18.3 (64.9)	23.5 (74.3)	27.6 (81.7)	28.8 (83.8)	26.7 (80.1)	21.9 (71.4)	16.0 (60.8)	8.8 (47.8)	1.8 (35.2)	15.7 (60.3)
Daily mean °C (°F)	−6.4 (20.5)	−2.2 (28.0)	4.3 (39.7)	11.5 (52.7)	17.0 (62.6)	21.4 (70.5)	22.9 (73.2)	20.9 (69.6)	15.8 (60.4)	9.4 (48.9)	2.4 (36.3)	−4.4 (24.1)	9.4 (48.9)
Mean daily minimum °C (°F)	−11.4 (11.5)	−7.1 (19.2)	−1.0 (30.2)	5.5 (41.9)	10.8 (51.4)	15.5 (59.9)	17.6 (63.7)	16.1 (61.0)	11.0 (51.8)	4.5 (40.1)	−2.2 (28.0)	−9.0 (15.8)	4.2 (39.5)
Record low °C (°F)	−27.3 (−17.1)	−22.7 (−8.9)	−19.0 (−2.2)	−9.9 (14.2)	−3.6 (25.5)	2.5 (36.5)	7.2 (45.0)	4.7 (40.5)	−5.0 (23.0)	−10.8 (12.6)	−19.3 (−2.7)	−26.5 (−15.7)	−27.3 (−17.1)
Average precipitation mm (inches)	2.4 (0.09)	3.6 (0.14)	9.5 (0.37)	24.0 (0.94)	37.9 (1.49)	48.0 (1.89)	84.3 (3.32)	93.6 (3.69)	59.7 (2.35)	28.7 (1.13)	10.7 (0.42)	2.3 (0.09)	404.7 (15.92)
Average precipitation days (≥ 0.1 mm)	2.8	2.7	3.7	5.0	6.4	9.1	11.2	11.0	9.1	7.0	3.9	1.9	73.8
Average snowy days	4.1	4.1	2.9	0.9	0	0	0	0	0	1.0	2.6	2.9	18.5
Average relative humidity (%)	48	45	40	38	42	48	61	67	67	59	51	47	51
Mean monthly sunshine hours	202.8	193.2	230.6	248.8	271.5	261.4	251.2	232.9	204.9	215.1	204.5	204.3	2,721.2
Percentage possible sunshine	66	63	62	63	62	59	56	56	56	63	68	69	62
Source: China Meteorological Administration

== Transportation ==
- G20 Qingdao–Yinchuan Expressway
- G65 Baotou–Maoming Expressway
- Taiyuan-Zhongwei-Yinchuan Railway
