= Hengshan District, Yulin =

Hengshan 横山区
- District
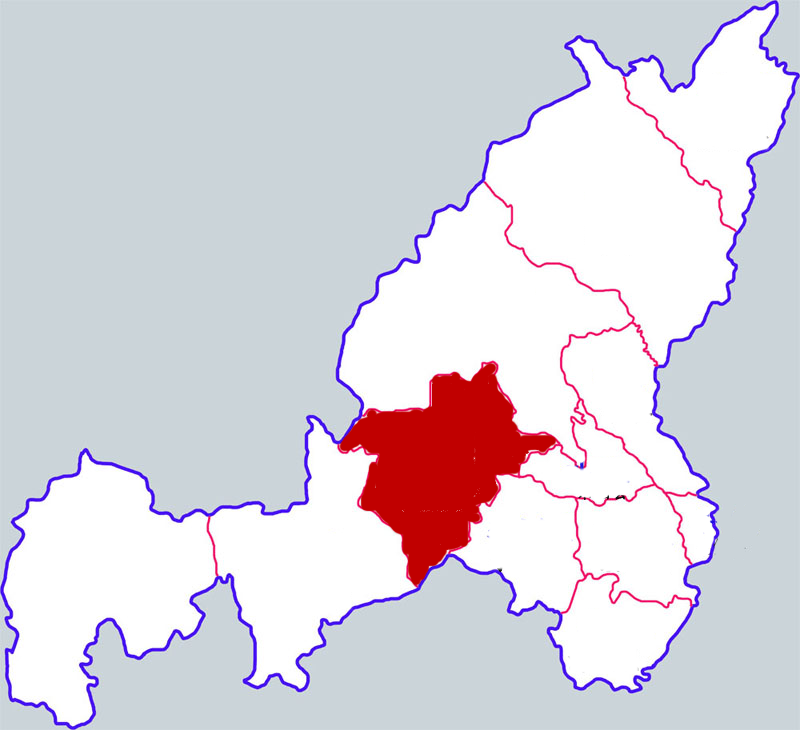
- Hengshan in Yulin

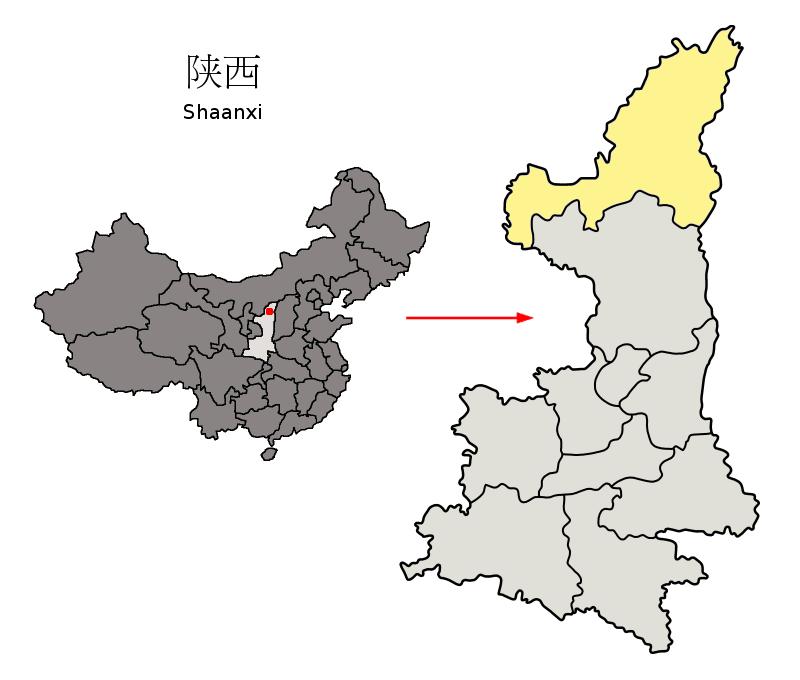
- Yulin in Shaanxi
- Coordinates: 37°57′43″N 109°17′38″E
- Country: People's Republic of China
- Province: Shaanxi
- Prefecture-level city: Yulin

Area
  - Total: 4,333 km^{2} (1,673 sq mi)

Population (2019)
  - Total: 383,558
  - Density: 88.52/km^{2} (229.3/sq mi)
- Time zone: UTC+8 (China standard time)
- Postal code: 719199
- Licence plates: 陕K

Hengshan District (simplified Chinese: 横山区; traditional Chinese: 橫山區; pinyin: Héngshān Qū) is a district of the city of Yulin, Shaanxi province, China, bordering Inner Mongolia to the northwest.

== Administrative divisions ==
As of 2019, Hengshan District is divided to 5 subdistricts and 13 towns.

Subdistricts

- Chengguan Subdistrict (城关街道)
- Huaiyuan Subdistrict (怀远街道)
- Xiazhou Subdistrict (夏州街道)
- Huairenlu Subdistrict (怀仁路街道)
- Chongdelu Subdistrict (崇德路街道)

Towns

- Shiwan (石湾镇)
- Gao (高镇)
- Wu (武镇)
- Dangcha (党岔镇)
- Xiangshui (响水镇)
- Boluo (波罗镇)
- Dianshi (殿市镇)
- Tawan (塔湾镇)
- Zhaoshipan (赵石畔镇)
- Weijialou (魏家楼镇)
- Hancha (韩岔镇)
- Baijie (白界镇)
- Leilongwan (雷龙湾镇)

== Climate ==
Climate data for Hengshan District, elevation 1,111 m (3,645 ft), (1991–2020 normals, extremes 1981–2010)
| Month | Jan | Feb | Mar | Apr | May | Jun | Jul | Aug | Sep | Oct | Nov | Dec | Year |
|---|---|---|---|---|---|---|---|---|---|---|---|---|---|
| Record high °C (°F) | 13.7 (56.7) | 20.0 (68.0) | 29.5 (85.1) | 35.3 (95.5) | 36.3 (97.3) | 40.4 (104.7) | 39.9 (103.8) | 36.0 (96.8) | 36.4 (97.5) | 29.7 (85.5) | 24.0 (75.2) | 15.2 (59.4) | 40.4 (104.7) |
| Mean daily maximum °C (°F) | 0.0 (32.0) | 5.1 (41.2) | 12.1 (53.8) | 19.7 (67.5) | 25.1 (77.2) | 29.4 (84.9) | 30.7 (87.3) | 28.2 (82.8) | 23.3 (73.9) | 17.0 (62.6) | 9.2 (48.6) | 1.7 (35.1) | 16.8 (62.2) |
| Daily mean °C (°F) | −7.8 (18.0) | −2.8 (27.0) | 4.3 (39.7) | 11.9 (53.4) | 17.7 (63.9) | 22.2 (72.0) | 24.0 (75.2) | 21.8 (71.2) | 16.5 (61.7) | 9.6 (49.3) | 1.7 (35.1) | −5.7 (21.7) | 9.5 (49.0) |
| Mean daily minimum °C (°F) | −13.9 (7.0) | −9.1 (15.6) | −2.3 (27.9) | 4.6 (40.3) | 10.3 (50.5) | 15.2 (59.4) | 18.1 (64.6) | 16.5 (61.7) | 10.9 (51.6) | 3.6 (38.5) | −3.9 (25.0) | −11.3 (11.7) | 3.2 (37.8) |
| Record low °C (°F) | −26.6 (−15.9) | −24.3 (−11.7) | −17.9 (−0.2) | −7.6 (18.3) | −1.1 (30.0) | 5.5 (41.9) | 10.7 (51.3) | 6.9 (44.4) | −0.8 (30.6) | −9.2 (15.4) | −17.8 (0.0) | −27.7 (−17.9) | −27.7 (−17.9) |
| Average precipitation mm (inches) | 2.8 (0.11) | 3.9 (0.15) | 9.5 (0.37) | 19.9 (0.78) | 29.7 (1.17) | 48.9 (1.93) | 77.6 (3.06) | 90.3 (3.56) | 58.0 (2.28) | 22.4 (0.88) | 12.4 (0.49) | 2.1 (0.08) | 377.5 (14.86) |
| Average precipitation days (≥ 0.1 mm) | 2.4 | 2.5 | 3.6 | 4.2 | 5.8 | 8.4 | 10.3 | 10.2 | 9.0 | 5.8 | 3.2 | 1.7 | 67.1 |
| Average snowy days | 3.3 | 3.0 | 1.9 | 0.7 | 0 | 0 | 0 | 0 | 0 | 0.4 | 1.8 | 2.4 | 13.5 |
| Average relative humidity (%) | 52 | 46 | 41 | 37 | 40 | 47 | 59 | 66 | 66 | 60 | 55 | 52 | 52 |
| Mean monthly sunshine hours | 206.6 | 196.7 | 235.0 | 249.8 | 276.4 | 262.6 | 242.5 | 224.8 | 204.5 | 213.1 | 203.7 | 202.9 | 2,718.6 |
| Percentage possible sunshine | 67 | 64 | 63 | 63 | 63 | 59 | 55 | 54 | 56 | 62 | 68 | 69 | 62 |
Source: China Meteorological Administration

== Transport ==
- Shenmu–Yan'an Railway
