= Mizhi County =

Coordinates: 37°45′22″N 110°10′41″E

Mizhi County 米脂县 Micheh
- County
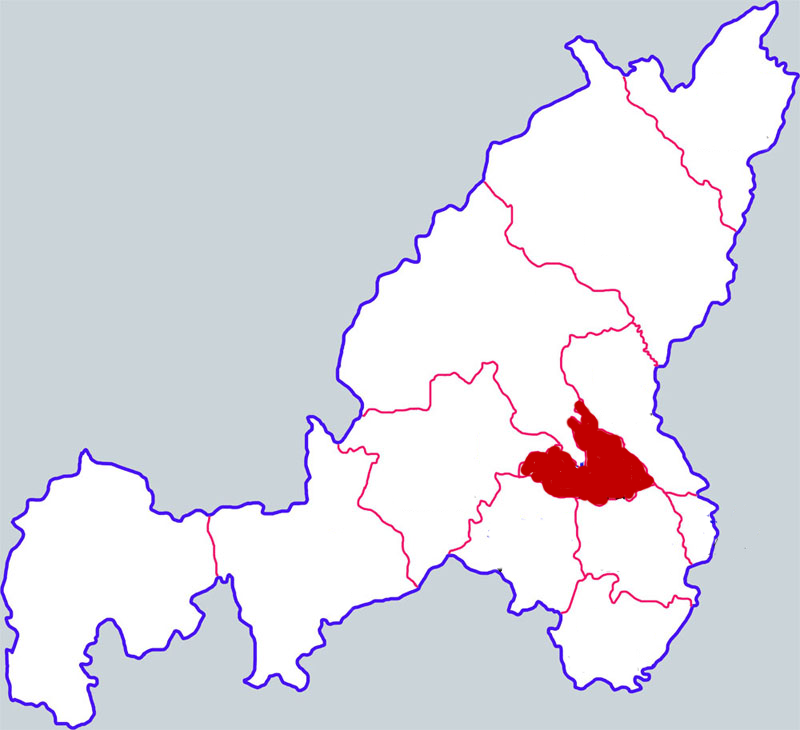
- Mizhi in Yulin

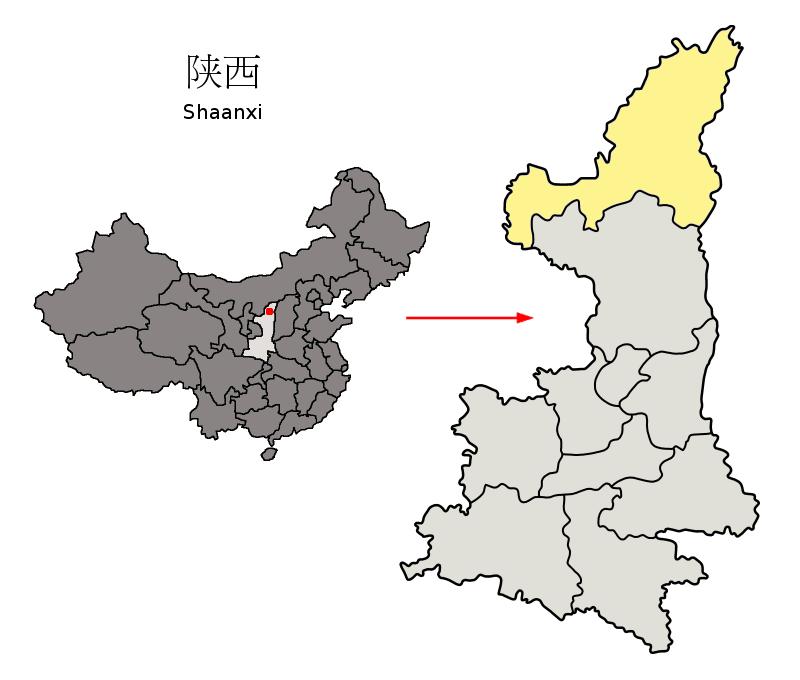
- Yulin in Shaanxi
- Country: People's Republic of China
- Province: Shaanxi
- Prefecture-level city: Yulin

Area
  - Total: 1,212 km^{2} (468 sq mi)

Population (2018)
  - Total: 221,847
  - Density: 183.0/km^{2} (474.1/sq mi)
- Time zone: UTC+8 (China standard time)
- Postal code: 718100
- Licence plates: 陕K

Mizhi County (Chinese: 米脂县; pinyin: Mǐzhī Xiàn) is a county of Yulin, Shaanxi, China. Mizhi is situated in the Loess Plateau on the banks of Wuding River.

The county is established in 1226, named after Mizhizhai (Chinese: 米脂寨; pinyin: Mǐzhī zhài, Mizhi Stockade). It was renamed Tianbao in about 1643 by Li Zicheng, but was restored as Mizhi soon thereafter. Li had additionally built his temporary palace in the county. During the second Sino-Japanese war, it was administered by the Shaanxi-Gansu-Ningxia Border Region government.

== Administrative divisions ==
As of 2019, Mizhi County is divided to 1 subdistricts and 7 towns.

Subdistricts

- Yinzhou Subdistrict (银州街道)

Towns

- Tao (桃镇)
- Long (龙镇)
- Yangjiagou (杨家沟镇)
- Dujiashigou (杜家石沟镇)
- Shajiadian (沙家店镇)
- Yindou (印斗镇)
- Guoxingzhuang (郭兴庄镇)
- Chengjiao (城郊镇)

== Climate ==
Climate data for Mizhi, elevation 931 m (3,054 ft), (1991–2020 normals, extremes 1981–2010)
Month	Jan	Feb	Mar	Apr	May	Jun	Jul	Aug	Sep	Oct	Nov	Dec	Year
Record high °C (°F)	12.5 (54.5)	19.7 (67.5)	28.8 (83.8)	37.0 (98.6)	38.0 (100.4)	40.5 (104.9)	39.8 (103.6)	36.5 (97.7)	36.7 (98.1)	29.0 (84.2)	22.3 (72.1)	13.7 (56.7)	40.5 (104.9)
Mean daily maximum °C (°F)	0.6 (33.1)	6.0 (42.8)	13.2 (55.8)	21.0 (69.8)	26.4 (79.5)	30.3 (86.5)	31.1 (88.0)	28.9 (84.0)	23.9 (75.0)	17.6 (63.7)	9.6 (49.3)	2.2 (36.0)	17.6 (63.6)
Daily mean °C (°F)	−7.4 (18.7)	−2.2 (28.0)	5.1 (41.2)	12.8 (55.0)	18.6 (65.5)	23.0 (73.4)	24.5 (76.1)	22.4 (72.3)	16.9 (62.4)	9.8 (49.6)	1.9 (35.4)	−5.4 (22.3)	10.0 (50.0)
Mean daily minimum °C (°F)	−13.3 (8.1)	−8.3 (17.1)	−1.6 (29.1)	5.3 (41.5)	10.9 (51.6)	15.9 (60.6)	18.9 (66.0)	17.4 (63.3)	11.6 (52.9)	4.1 (39.4)	−3.4 (25.9)	−10.7 (12.7)	3.9 (39.0)
Record low °C (°F)	−26.8 (−16.2)	−22.3 (−8.1)	−17.0 (1.4)	−5.9 (21.4)	−1.7 (28.9)	5.6 (42.1)	9.9 (49.8)	6.5 (43.7)	−2.7 (27.1)	−9.5 (14.9)	−20.0 (−4.0)	−25.5 (−13.9)	−26.8 (−16.2)
Average precipitation mm (inches)	3.2 (0.13)	5.1 (0.20)	10.8 (0.43)	24.9 (0.98)	31.6 (1.24)	51.2 (2.02)	104.1 (4.10)	106.7 (4.20)	64.7 (2.55)	31.4 (1.24)	16.6 (0.65)	2.6 (0.10)	452.9 (17.84)
Average precipitation days (≥ 0.1 mm)	2.4	2.9	3.9	5.1	6.3	8.9	11.5	11.6	9.3	7.0	4.0	1.9	74.8
Average snowy days	3.1	2.9	1.7	0.4	0	0	0	0	0	0.1	1.6	2.5	12.3
Average relative humidity (%)	58	52	47	44	46	53	67	74	75	71	65	59	59
Mean monthly sunshine hours	217.3	208.4	252.2	271.5	300.8	289.6	270.0	256.9	222.1	223.9	207.3	213.0	2,933
Percentage possible sunshine	71	68	68	68	68	66	61	62	60	65	69	72	67
Source: China Meteorological Administration

== Transportation ==
- China National Highway 210
