= Xi'an–Yan'an railway =

Railway line in Shaanxi, China

The Xi'an–Yan'an railway or Xiyan railway (simplified Chinese: 西延铁路; traditional Chinese: 西延鐵路; pinyin: xīyán tiělù), is a railroad in Shaanxi Province of China between Xi'an, the provincial capital, and Yan'an. The line is 334 km (208 mi) long and was built in 1997 and partially double-tracked in 2007. Major cities and counties along route include Xi'an, Ganquan, Fu County, Huangling, Yijun, Baishui County, Pucheng County and Yan'an.

The line will be paralleled by the Xi'an–Yan'an high-speed railway.

== Rail connections ==
- Xi'an: Longhai railway, Houma–Xi'an railway, Nanjing–Xi'an railway, Xi'an–Ankang railway
- Yan'an: Shenmu–Yan'an railway

== See also ==
- List of railways in China
