= Taiyuan–Zhongwei–Yinchuan railway =

Railway line in China

Taiyuan–Zhongwei–Yinchuan railway 太中银铁路
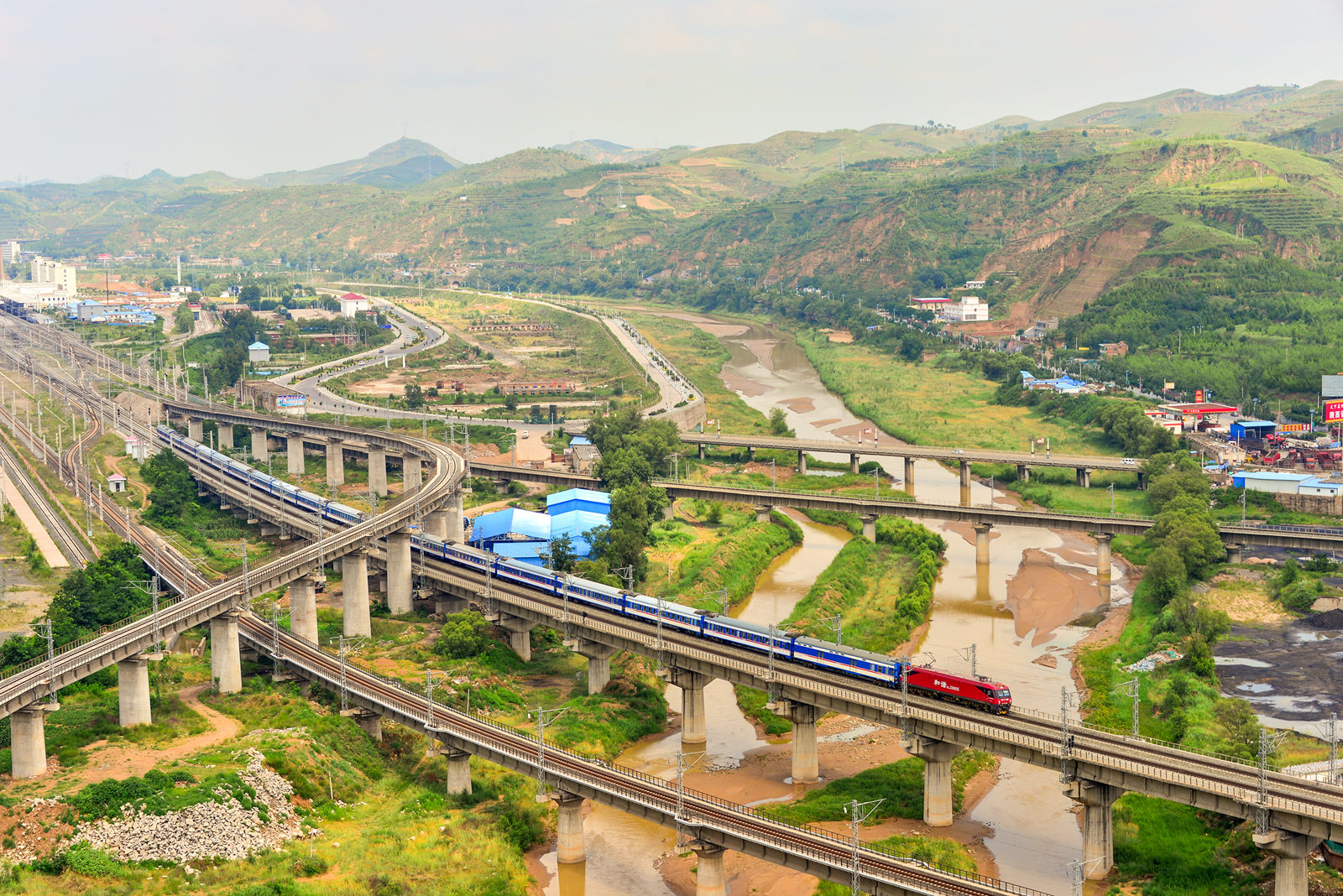
- A T70 passenger train from Beijing West to Urumqi North on the Taiyuan–Zhongwei–Yinchuan railway over the Wuding River in Suide, Shaanxi Province near the intersection with the Shenmu–Yan'an railway (Photo taken in 2014).

Overview
- Owner: China Railway
- Locale: Shanxi and Ningxia
- Termini: Taiyuan South; Zhongwei
- Stations: 37

Service
- Type: Class 1 main line
- Operator(s): China Railway: Taiyuan Group, Xi'an Group, Lanzhou Group

History
- Opened: January 11, 2011

Technical
- Line length: 945 km (587 mi)
- Track gauge: 1,435 mm (4 ft 8 1/2 in)
- Electrification: 50 Hz, 25,000 V
- Operating speed: 160 km/h (99 mph)

The Taiyuan–Zhongwei–Yinchuan railway (Chinese: 太中银铁路) is a railway line in northern China, connecting Taiyuan, the capital of Shanxi Province, with Zhongwei and Yinchuan in Ningxia Hui Autonomous Region. It is a double-track electric railway, opened in 2011.

== Routing ==
The main line of the railway runs in the general east-west direction from Taiyuan to Zhongwei via Lüliang and Dingbian, serving a number of communities in western Shanxi, northern Shaanxi and Ningxia, many of which previously did not have rail service at all. The Dingbian-Yinchuan branch runs from Dingbian northwest, to Ningxia's capital city Yinchuan.

The railway also has a short dead-end branch from Lüliang to Lin County (Linxian) in the northwestern Shanxi.

In some areas (a section of the main line east of Dingbian, and the Dingbian-Yinchuan branch), the railway route roughly parallels the Great Wall of China.

== Service ==
Together with the Shijiazhuang–Taiyuan high-speed railway, the Taiyuan–Zhongwei–Yinchuan railway provides a more direct route between Beijing and Ningxia than those that were available before. Together with the Zhongwei-Wuwei line in Ningxia and Gansu, it offers a shorter route between Beijing and Xinjiang than the more standard route via Zhengzhou and Lanzhou.

== History ==
Construction started in May 2006. The railway was opened on January 11, 2011. It includes the 20 km (12 mi) long Lüliangshan Tunnel near Lüliang City in western Shanxi.

== Rail junctions ==
- Taiyuan: Shijiazhuang–Taiyuan railway, Taiyuan–Jiaozuo railway, Shitai passenger railway
- Liulin:Shanxi–Henan–Shandong railway
- Suide:Shenmu–Yan'an railway
- Zhongwei:Baotou–Lanzhou railway
- Yichuan:Baotou–Lanzhou railway
