= Dingbian County =

Coordinates: 37°26′59″N 107°49′44″E

Dingbian County 定边县 Tingpien
- County
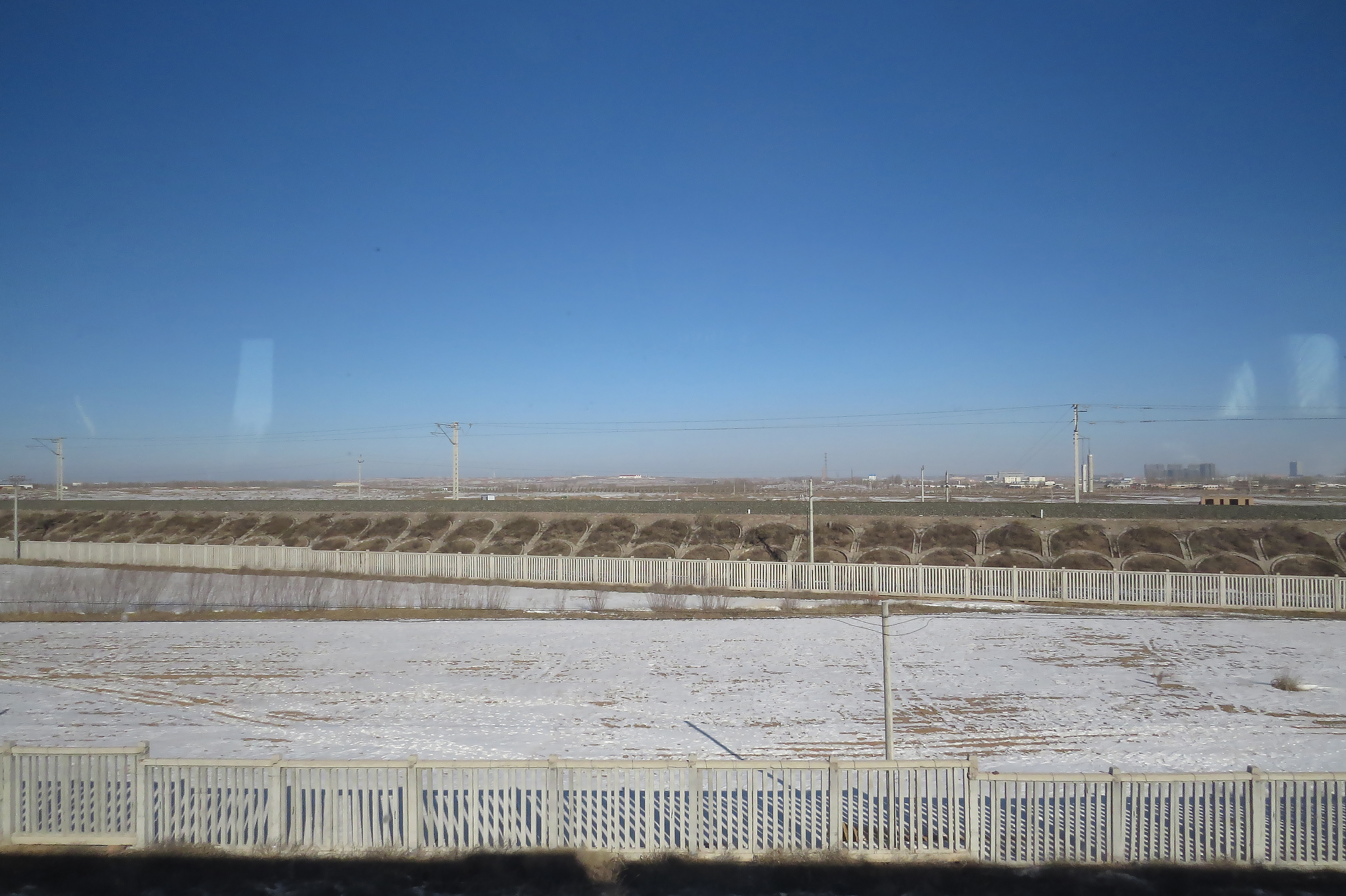
- View of the seat of Dingbian from the Dingbian branch line of the Taiyuan–Zhongwei–Yinchuan railway

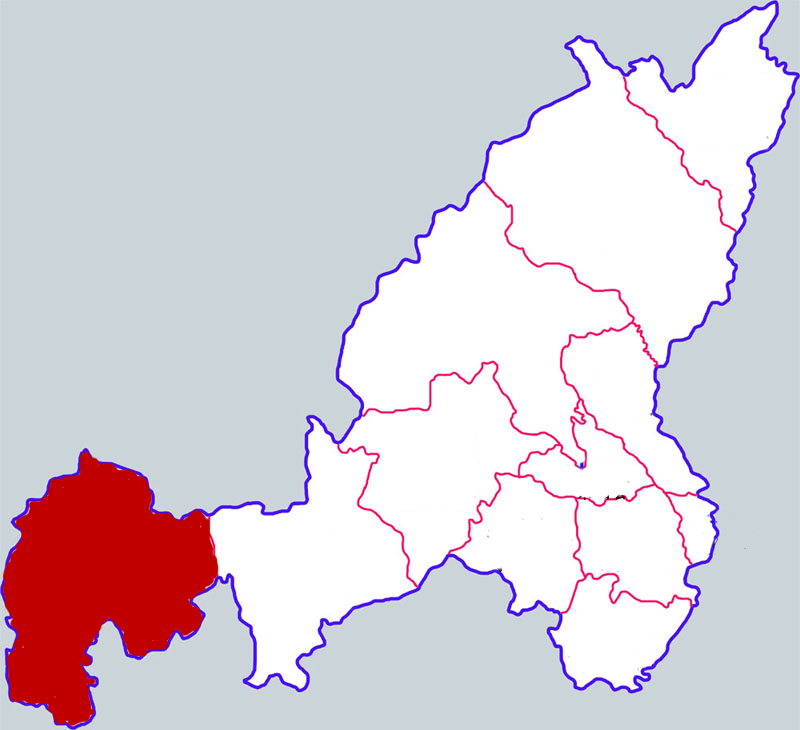
- Dingbian in Yulin

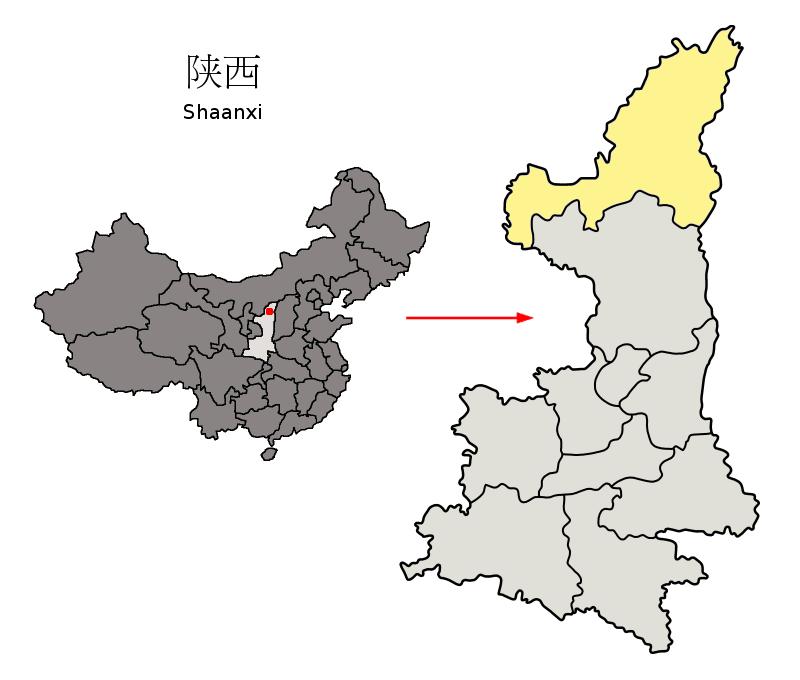
- Yulin in Shaanxi
- Country: People's Republic of China
- Province: Shaanxi
- Prefecture-level city: Yulin
- Established: 1731

Area
  - Total: 6,920 km^{2} (2,670 sq mi)

Population
  - Total: 344,900
  - Density: 49.8/km^{2} (129/sq mi)
- Time zone: UTC+8 (China standard time)
- Postal Code: 718699
- Area code: (0)912
- Licence plates: 陕K
- Website: dingbian.gov.cn

Dingbian County (simplified Chinese: 定边县; traditional Chinese: 定邊縣; pinyin: Dìngbiān Xiàn) is a county in the northwest of Shaanxi province, China, bordering the Ningxia Hui Autonomous Region to the west and Inner Mongolia to the north. It is the westernmost county-level division under the administration of Yulin City.

== Administrative divisions ==
As of 2020, Dingbian County is divided to 1 subdistrict, 16 towns, and 2 townships.

Subdistricts

- Dingbian Subdistrict (定边街道)

Towns

- Hequan (贺圈镇)
- Hongliugou (红柳沟镇)
- Zhuanjing (砖井镇)
- Bainijing (白泥井镇)
- Anbian (安边镇)
- Duiziliang (堆子梁镇)
- Baiwanzi (白湾子镇)
- Jiyuan (姬塬镇)
- Yangjing (杨井镇)
- Xin'anbian (新安边镇)
- Zhangyaoxian (张崾先镇)
- Fanxue (樊学镇)
- Yanchangbao (盐场堡镇)
- Haotan (郝滩镇)
- Shidonggou (石洞沟镇)
- Fengdikeng (冯地坑镇)

Townships

- Youfangzhuang Township (油房庄乡)
- Xuezhuang Township (学庄乡)

== Climate ==
Climate data for Dingbian, elevation 1,360 m (4,460 ft), (1991–2020 normals, extremes 1981–2010)
| Month | Jan | Feb | Mar | Apr | May | Jun | Jul | Aug | Sep | Oct | Nov | Dec | Year |
|---|---|---|---|---|---|---|---|---|---|---|---|---|---|
| Record high °C (°F) | 15.6 (60.1) | 19.1 (66.4) | 27.4 (81.3) | 33.3 (91.9) | 35.5 (95.9) | 36.6 (97.9) | 37.7 (99.9) | 36.2 (97.2) | 34.9 (94.8) | 27.7 (81.9) | 23.1 (73.6) | 17.2 (63.0) | 37.7 (99.9) |
| Mean daily maximum °C (°F) | 0.4 (32.7) | 4.8 (40.6) | 11.4 (52.5) | 18.7 (65.7) | 23.9 (75.0) | 28.3 (82.9) | 29.7 (85.5) | 27.5 (81.5) | 22.4 (72.3) | 16.4 (61.5) | 9.1 (48.4) | 2.1 (35.8) | 16.2 (61.2) |
| Daily mean °C (°F) | −6.9 (19.6) | −2.6 (27.3) | 4.2 (39.6) | 11.4 (52.5) | 17.1 (62.8) | 21.6 (70.9) | 23.3 (73.9) | 21.2 (70.2) | 16.1 (61.0) | 9.4 (48.9) | 2.0 (35.6) | −4.9 (23.2) | 9.3 (48.8) |
| Mean daily minimum °C (°F) | −13.1 (8.4) | −9.0 (15.8) | −2.2 (28.0) | 4.4 (39.9) | 10.0 (50.0) | 14.7 (58.5) | 17.3 (63.1) | 15.6 (60.1) | 10.5 (50.9) | 3.5 (38.3) | −3.8 (25.2) | −10.8 (12.6) | 3.1 (37.6) |
| Record low °C (°F) | −27.7 (−17.9) | −26.8 (−16.2) | −21.7 (−7.1) | −9.7 (14.5) | −3.9 (25.0) | 3.6 (38.5) | 7.4 (45.3) | 5.7 (42.3) | −2.7 (27.1) | −11.5 (11.3) | −20.8 (−5.4) | −29.1 (−20.4) | −29.1 (−20.4) |
| Average precipitation mm (inches) | 2.8 (0.11) | 3.4 (0.13) | 6.9 (0.27) | 17.8 (0.70) | 32.5 (1.28) | 45.5 (1.79) | 71.3 (2.81) | 79.7 (3.14) | 53.3 (2.10) | 21.6 (0.85) | 10.1 (0.40) | 2.0 (0.08) | 346.9 (13.66) |
| Average precipitation days (≥ 0.1 mm) | 2.8 | 2.1 | 3.1 | 4.6 | 5.8 | 7.3 | 9.6 | 10.0 | 8.9 | 5.7 | 3.5 | 1.6 | 65 |
| Average snowy days | 4.2 | 3.6 | 3.0 | 1.0 | 0 | 0 | 0 | 0 | 0 | 0.9 | 2.9 | 3.0 | 18.6 |
| Average relative humidity (%) | 50 | 46 | 41 | 38 | 40 | 46 | 57 | 64 | 65 | 57 | 52 | 49 | 50 |
| Mean monthly sunshine hours | 207.3 | 199.4 | 227.2 | 238.7 | 266.3 | 262.6 | 249.2 | 232.7 | 201.8 | 221.3 | 209.3 | 202.5 | 2,718.3 |
| Percentage possible sunshine | 67 | 65 | 61 | 60 | 60 | 60 | 56 | 56 | 55 | 65 | 70 | 68 | 62 |
Source: China Meteorological Administration

== Transportation ==
- China National Highway 307
- G20 Qingdao–Yinchuan Expressway
- Taiyuan-Zhongwei-Yinchuan Railway; at Dingbian, the Dingbian-Yinchuan branch joins the main Taiyuan-Zhongwei line.
