= China National Highway 210 =

Road in China

National Highway 210
- 210国道

Route information
- Length: 3,097 km (1,924 mi)

Major junctions
- From: Mandula (Baotou), Inner Mongolia
- To: Fangchenggang, Guangxi

Location
- Country: China

Highway system
- National Trunk Highway System; Primary; Auxiliary
← G209	→ G211

China National Highway 210 (G210) runs from Mandula in Baotou, Inner Mongolia to Fangchenggang, Guangxi. It is 3,097 kilometres in length and runs south from Baotou and passes through the province-level divisions of Shaanxi, Sichuan, Chongqing, Guizhou, and ends in Guangxi.

== Route and distance ==
Route and distance

City	Distance (km)
Baotou, Inner Mongolia	0
Dalad Qi, Inner Mongolia	44
Dongsheng, Inner Mongolia	136
Ejin Horo Qi, Inner Mongolia	176
Yulin, Shaanxi	347
Mizhi, Shaanxi	429
Suide, Shaanxi	460
Qingjian, Shaanxi	523
Zichang, Shaanxi	570
Yan'an, Shaanxi	663
Ganquan, Shaanxi	703
Luochuan, Shaanxi	787
Huangling, Shaanxi	829
Yijun, Shaanxi	861
Tongchuan, Shaanxi	910
Yaoxian, Shaanxi	930
Sanyuan, Shaanxi	979
Xi'an, Shaanxi	1017
Ningshan County, Shaanxi	1201
Shiquan, Shaanxi	1278
Zhenba, Shaanxi	1424
Wanyuan, Sichuan	1513
Dazhou, Sichuan	1664
Dazhu, Sichuan	1739
Linshui, Sichuan	1804
Yubei, Chongqing	1897
Chongqing	1923
Banan, Chongqing	1954
Qijiang, Chongqing	2014
Tongzi, Guizhou	2191
Zunyi, Guizhou	2253
Xifeng, Guizhou	2344
Guiyang, Guizhou	2418
Longli, Guizhou	2455
Guiding, Guizhou	2478
Duyun, Guizhou	2574
Dushan, Guizhou	2641
Nandan, Guangxi	2765
Du'an, Guangxi	2938
Mashan, Guangxi	2967
Wuming, Guangxi	3052
Nanning, Guangxi	3097

== See also ==
- China National Highways
