= Wuding River =

Coordinates: 37.0450°N 110.4361°E

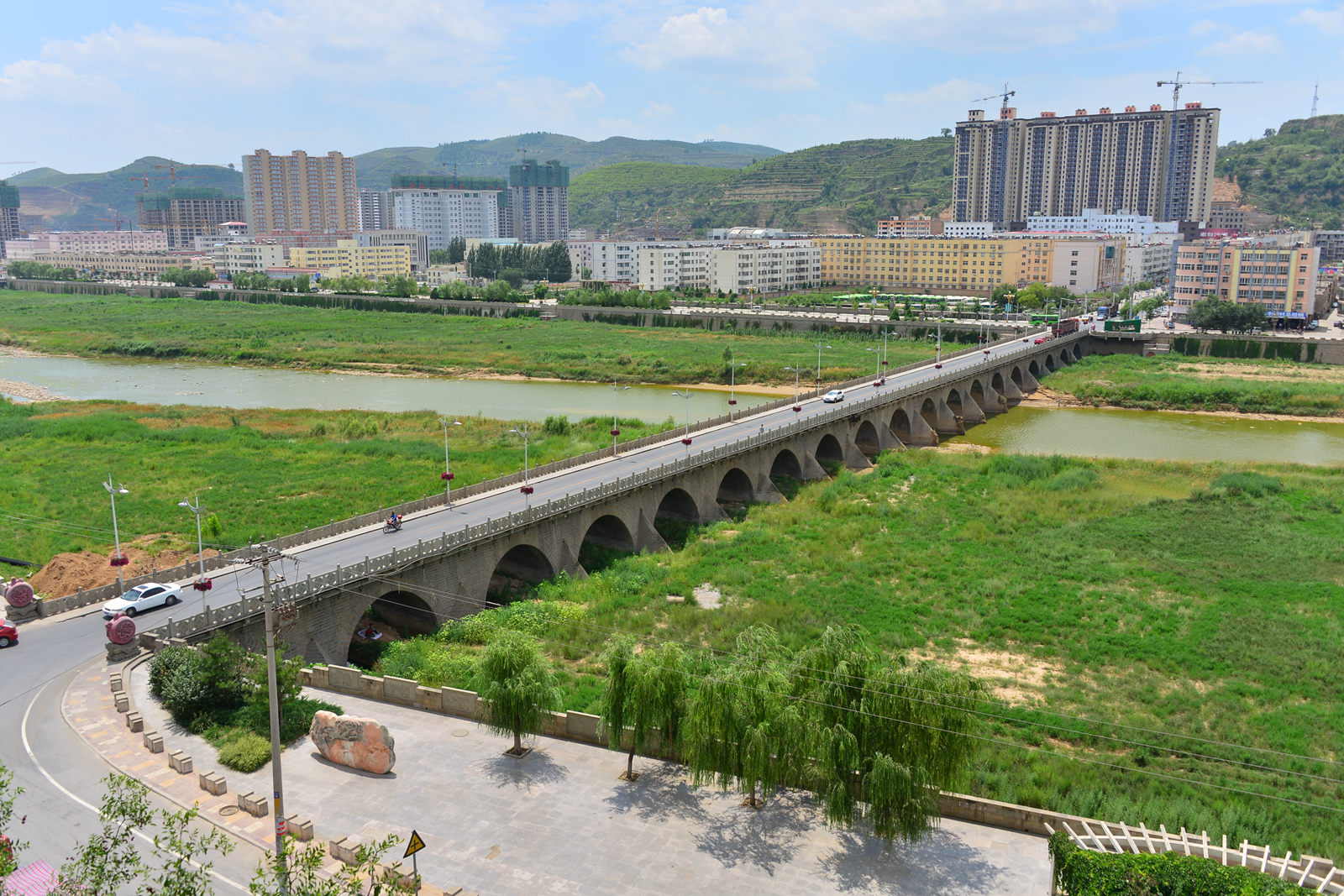
- The Wuding River in Suide, Shaanxi Province traversed by the Taiyuan–Zhongwei–Yinchuan Railway

Location
- Countries: China

The Wuding River (Chinese: 无定河) begins in the Ordos Desert in Shaanxi Province, Inner Mongolia and flows south into loess canyons and farmland. After around 160 kilometres (100 mi) it flows into the great Yellow River. The Wuding has its own tributaries, such as the Dali River, Hailiutu River, Hanjiang River, and the Danjiang River. The course of the river roughly parallels the northern route of the ancient Silk Road, now the National Highway 210.

== History ==
The river's name means "winding" or "unstable" or "capricious" or "without a fixed course". This relates to its shifting course during classical times. The river area was much contested in classical times, and many battles were fought along and around it. On its early northern reaches stood the 'White City' of Tongwancheng, the main Hun capital on the non-Chinese side of the Great Wall of China. The river served as a military boundary into the warlord period of Chinese history, when opium replaced cotton as the crop on the river's fertile loess farmland, and into the modern communist period.

The river currently carries very high levels of silt due to the arid climate in its loess canyons and gulleys, and over the last 30 years extensive effort has been put into preventing erosion on the upper reaches of the river, so as to prevent coarse sediment from entering the Yellow River. Terraces, re-forestation, planting and control dams have all been tried, with considerable success.

== Cultural references ==
An ancient 9th century battle poem is set on the banks of the river - Chen Tao's Journey to Longxi describes a warrior dying on the riverbank, whereafter his lover only sees him in her dreams...

"Have pity on the white skeletons of the Wuding River, for they are men now only in the dreams of young women."

The river and its culture gave rise to the bardic folk song tradition of daoqing. By the late 19th and 20th centuries, this had taken the form of large troupes of blind storytellers and musicians. For more on this tradition see: "Blind Bards of The Wuding", in China Pictorial Nov 2006.
