= Tongwancheng =

Ruined city in China

Coordinates: 37.997515°N 108.862839°E

- Traditional Chinese: 統萬城
- Simplified Chinese: 统万城
- Literal meaning: "City to Govern Myriads"
Transcriptions
Standard Mandarin
- Hanyu Pinyin: Tǒngwànchéng
- Bopomofo: ㄊㄨㄥˇ ㄨㄢˋ ㄔㄥˊ
- Wade–Giles: T‘ung^{3}-wan^{4}-chêng^{2}
- IPA: [tʰʊ̀ŋ.wân.ʈʂʰə̌ŋ]
Yue: Cantonese
- Yale Romanization: Túngmaahnsìhng
- Jyutping: tung2 maan6 sing4
- IPA: [tʰʊŋ˧˥.man˨.sɪŋ˩]

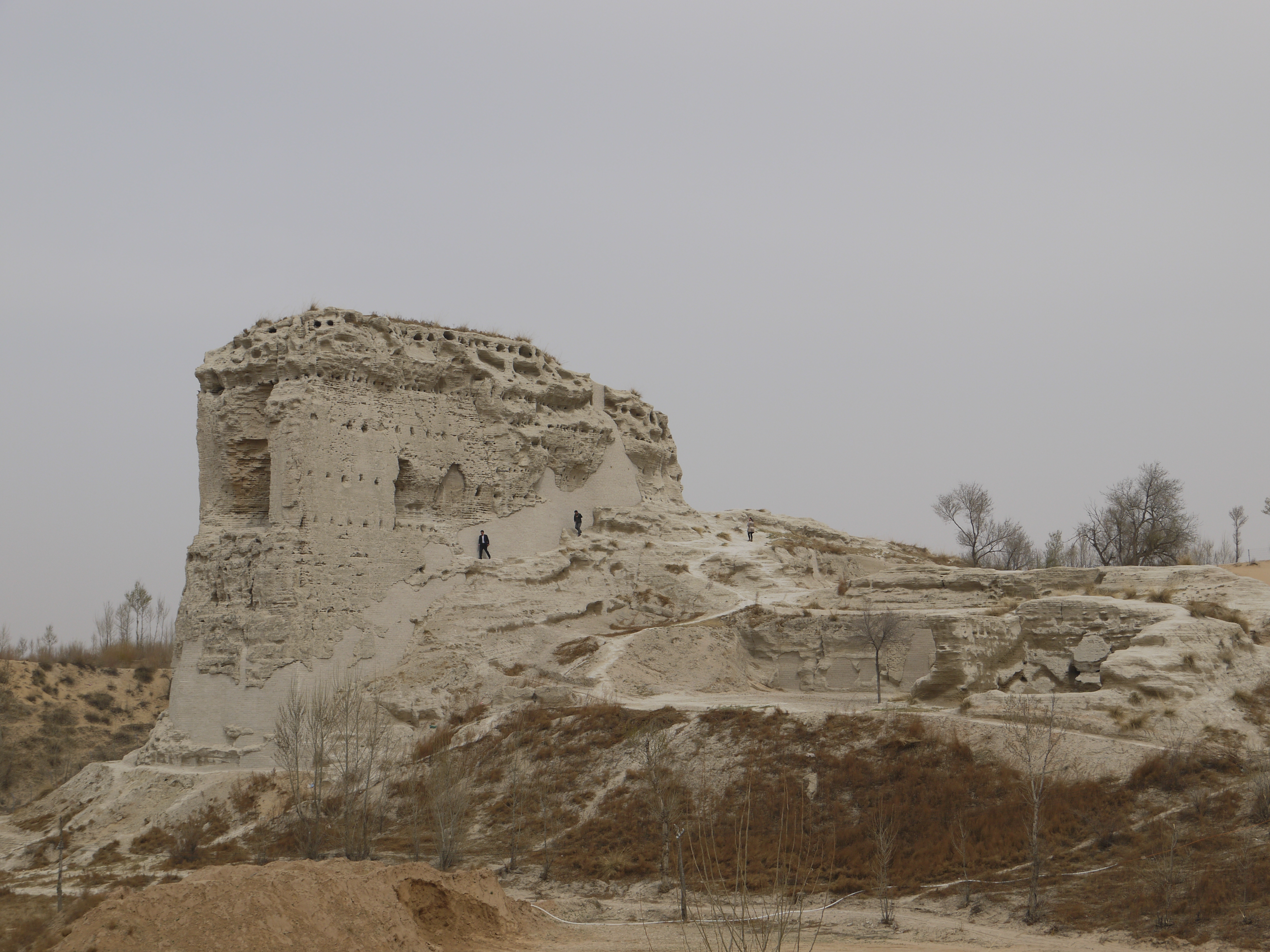
Remains in 2013, with human figures giving scale

Tongwancheng (Chinese: 統萬城; pinyin: Tǒngwànchéng; Wade–Giles: T‘ung^{3}-wan^{4}-chêng^{2}) was the capital of the Xiongnu-led Hu Xia dynasty in northern China during the Sixteen Kingdoms period in the early 5th century. The city is at the southern edge of the Maowusu Sands of the Ordos Desert, on what was formerly a strategic site in the center of the Ordos Plateau. Tongwancheng, which means the "city ruling ten thousand", is the largest urban center of the Southern Xiongnu that has ever been found. The city's ruins are well preserved and located in Jingbian County, Shaanxi Province, near the border with Inner Mongolia. The city has been surveyed and has had some elements restored, but not yet fully excavated.

Due to the worsening desertification around the city and other factors, in 994 the Emperor Taizong ordered the destruction of the city and the relocation of its residents. Tongwancheng gradually fell into ruin and was completely abandoned by the early Ming dynasty. In 1845, the ruins of Tongwancheng were rediscovered, and they were formally identified in 1956. In 1996, Tongwancheng was listed as a Major Historical and Cultural Site Protected at the National Level.

== History ==
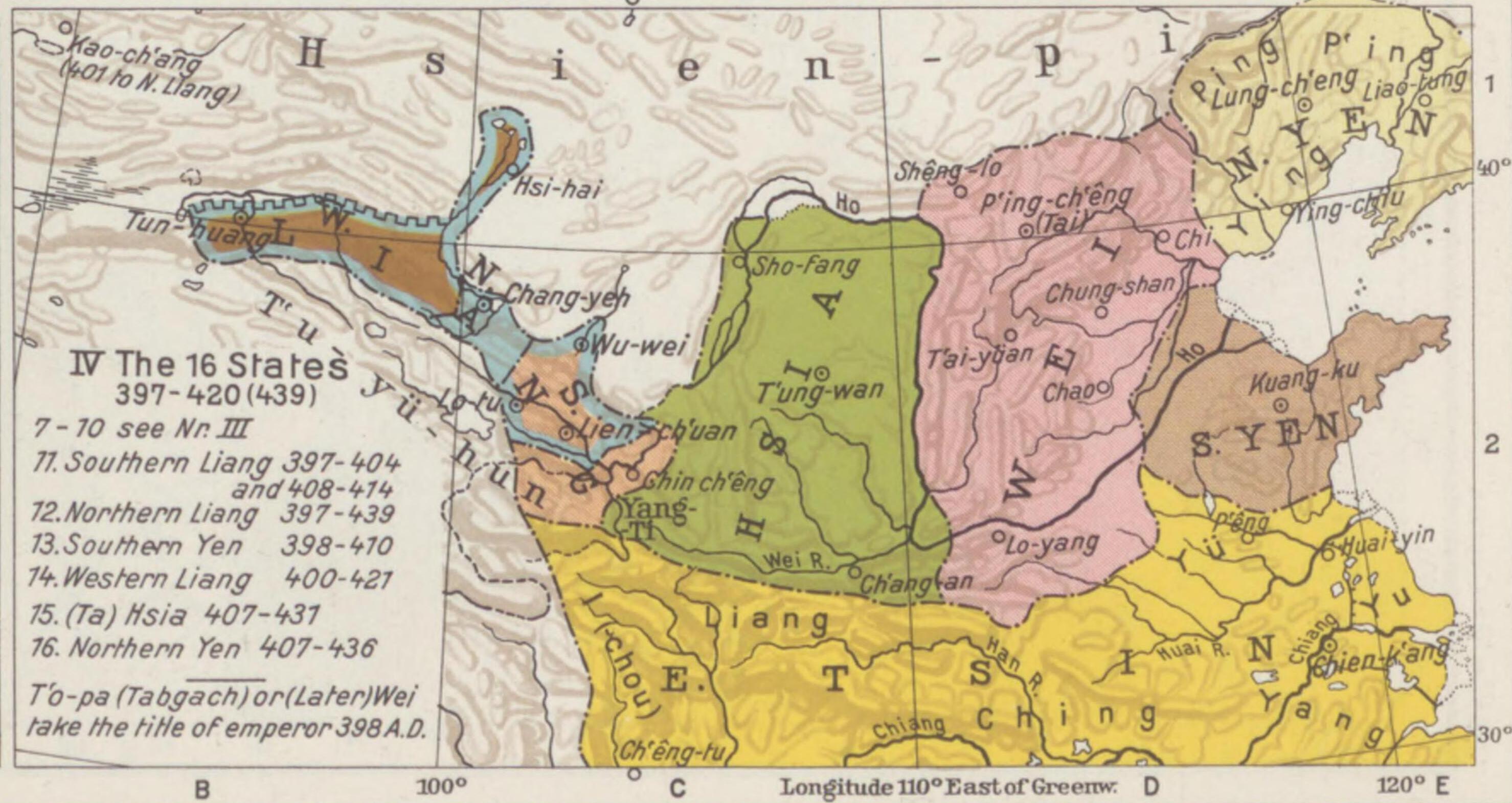
The State of Xia (Hsia) established by Helian Bobo

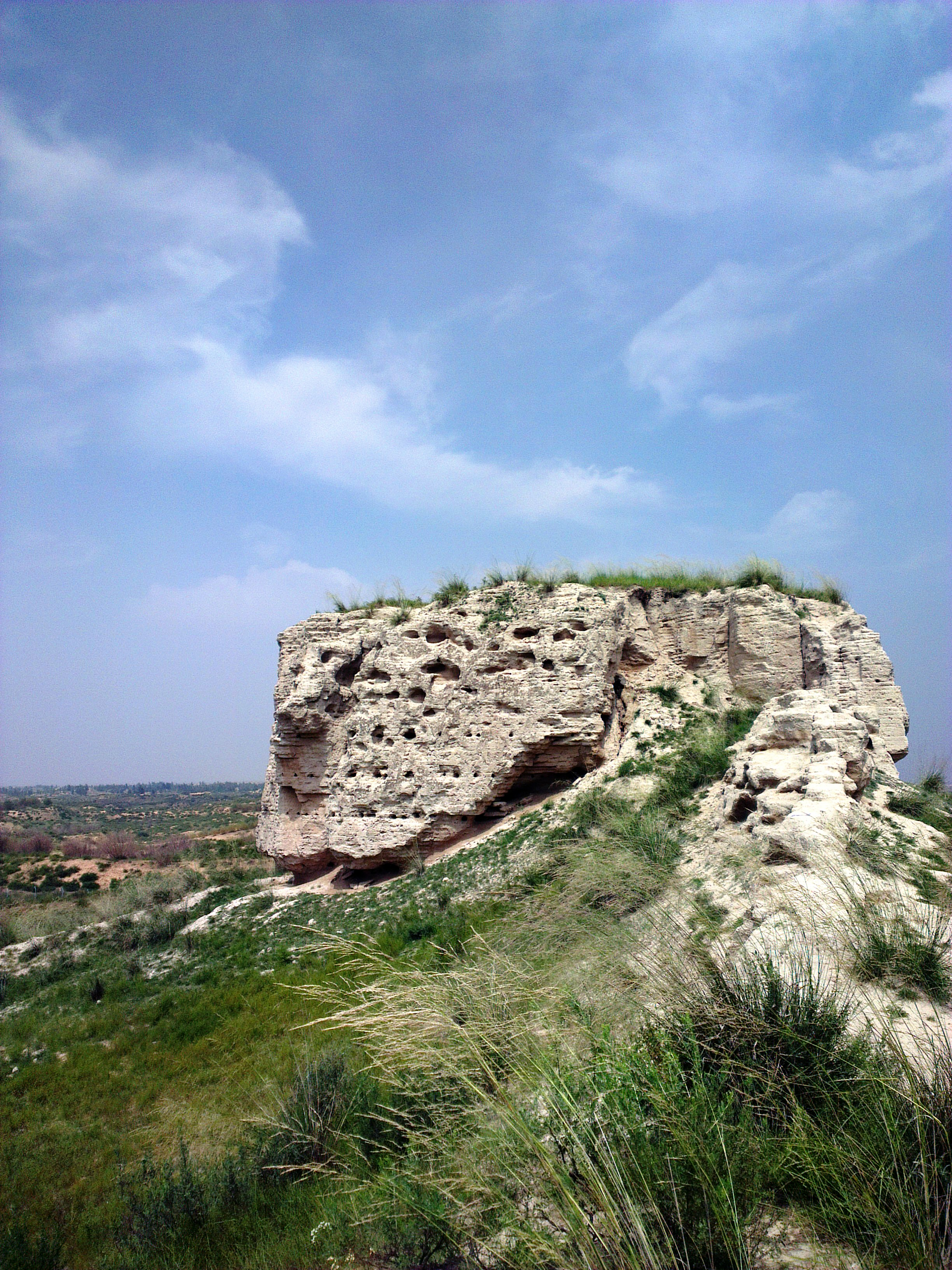
Remains in 2013

The city was built by around 100,000 Xiongnu of the Hu Xia dynasty under the command of Helian Bobo (Emperor Wulie) in 419. Helian Bobo, also known by his sinified surname as Liu Bobo, was a descendant of the Xiongnu chanyu who founded their steppe empire in the 3rd century BC. Helian Bobo died in 425 AD, and his son Helian Chang succeeded him as emperor of the city.

Helian Bobo had intended that the city be absolutely impenetrable, so he commissioned his cruel general Chigan Ali (叱干阿利) as the architect and set extremely strict rules for construction. Chigan ordered that the soil used in constructing the wall be steamed, so that it would be hardened and difficult to attack, and he often tested the walls during its construction; if an iron wedge were able to insert even one inch deep into the wall, the workmen who were in charge of that section of wall would be executed.

The Great Wall of China was built to contain the Xiongnu threat, and Tongwancheng was the main Xiongnu capital that stood on other side of that wall. The city was largely of wood construction and had very thick outer walls which were colored white with white clay earth and powdered rice. From a distance the white city was said to have had the appearance of a giant ship. At its center the city had a lake. The Book of Jin gives us a contemporary eyewitness description of the city:

"The hill is beautiful, in front of it the plain is wide, and around this there is a lake of pure water. I have wandered in many places, but I have not seen a land whose beauty can compare with that of this place".

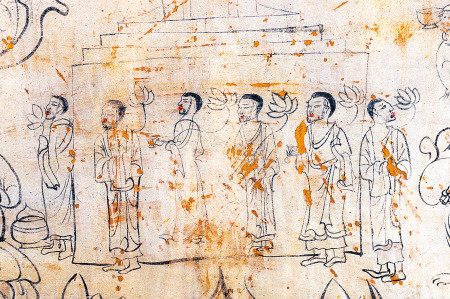
Fresco depicting Central Asians in a religious procession, probably a Buddhist ritual, in an ancient tomb at Tongwancheng.

At its height the population was around 10,000, likely to have been greatly supplemented by an encircling encampment of nomadic kin groups at certain times of the year. White cities were generally ceremonial and status centers built following conquest, rather than outright military positions, white being a holy color for the Xiongnu. Yet the thickness of the walls was certainly required since the city was originally built at a time of perpetual warfare. Both internal and external threats existed - for instance, Helian Bobo was attacked with an army by his deputy Helian Gui in 424 following a dynastic dispute.

In 426, the Emperor Taiwu of Northern Wei made a surprise attack on Tongwancheng. Although a brief incursion into the city succeeded only in burning the main temple, the surrounding hinterland was devastated. The city's site was on the fertile upper reaches of the Wuding River, but the river and lake died up, possibly due to deforestation that might be traced back to Taiwu's devastation. The city was then gradually buried by the sands of the desert. This 'wandering' (Wuding) gave the river its current name.

The Xiongnu continued to live in the region until the 7th or 8th century. In 786 the city was besieged by Tibetan forces, and it was invaded by Jurchen soldiers in 1206. There is no record of the site in Chinese records after the early 15th century.

The city was only properly surveyed by the Chinese in the 2000s. The city's Yong'an Platform, a military forces inspection platform for dignitaries, has been restored.

The city is also referred to in the literature variously as Tong Wan Cheng, Tongwan-cheng, Tongwan, Xia Zhou, Baichengzi (Chinese: 白城子; Wade–Giles: Pai-cheng-tzu), or Bai Cheng (白城; 'White City').

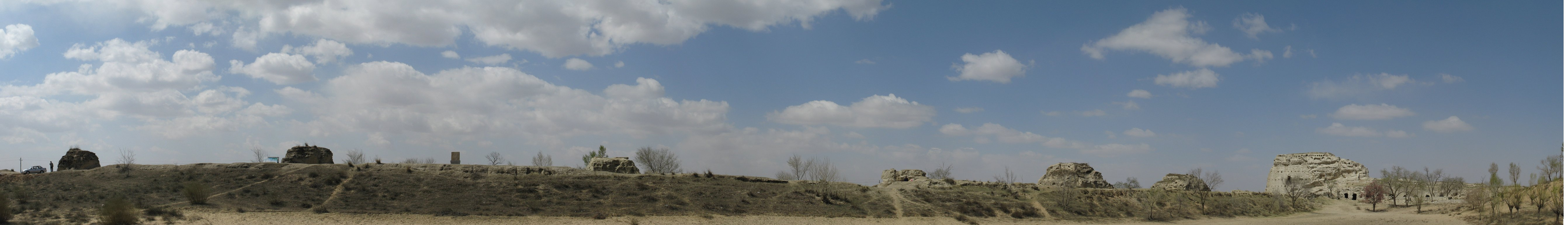
Tongwancheng in 2010.
