= Qikou, Huanghua =

Village in Hebei, China

Coordinates: 38°36′06″N 117°34′00″E

Qikou (Chinese: 歧口村; pinyin: Qíkǒu Cūn) is a village of Nanpaihe town, Huanghua, in the southeast of Hebei Province in North China. Lying on the coast of the Bohai Gulf, it is close to the Hebei–Tianjin border.

== Transport ==
- China National Highway 307
- Hebei Provincial Highway 364
- Jinqi Highway
