= Zizhou County =

Coordinates: 37°34′44″N 109°49′03″E

Zizhou County 子洲县
- County
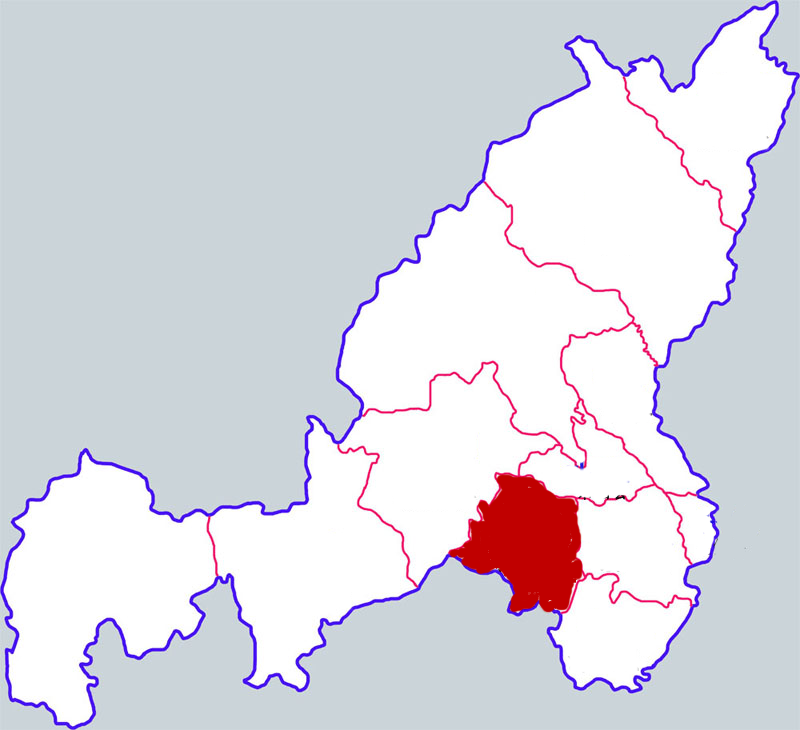
- Zizhou in Yulin

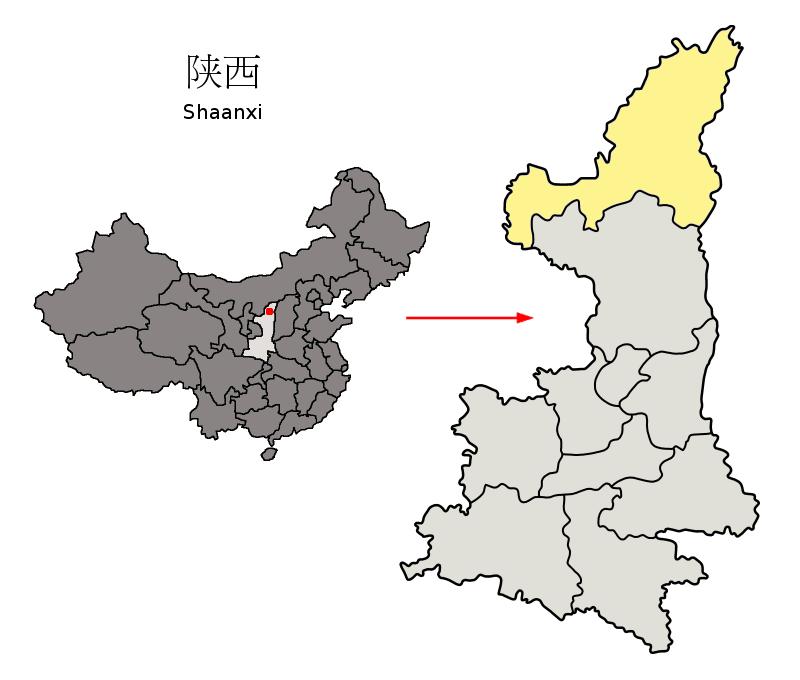
- Yulin in Shaanxi
- Country: People's Republic of China
- Province: Shaanxi
- Prefecture-level city: Yulin

Area
  - Total: 2,042 km^{2} (788 sq mi)

Population (2017)
  - Total: 303,900
  - Density: 148.8/km^{2} (385.5/sq mi)
- Time zone: UTC+8 (China standard time)
- Postal code: 718499
- Licence plates: 陕K

Zizhou County (Chinese: 子洲县; pinyin: Zǐzhōu Xiàn) is a county of Yulin, Shaanxi, China.

== Administrative divisions ==
As of 2019, Zizhou County is divided to 11 subdistricts, 5 towns and 1 township.

Subdistricts

- Binhexinqu Subdistrict (双湖峪街道)

Towns

- Hejiaji (何家集镇)
- Laojundian (老君殿镇)
- Peijiawan (裴家湾镇)
- Miaojiaping (苗家坪镇)
- Sanchuankou (三川口镇)
- Matigou (马蹄沟镇)
- Zhoujiadao (周家硷镇)
- Dianshi (电市镇)
- Zhuanmiao (砖庙镇)
- Huainingwan (淮宁湾镇)
- Macha (马岔镇)

Townships

- Tuoerxiang Township(驼耳巷乡)

== Climate ==
Climate data for Zizhou, elevation 895 m (2,936 ft), (1991–2020 normals, extremes 1981–2010)
Month	Jan	Feb	Mar	Apr	May	Jun	Jul	Aug	Sep	Oct	Nov	Dec	Year
Record high °C (°F)	13.0 (55.4)	23.7 (74.7)	29.0 (84.2)	37.5 (99.5)	38.0 (100.4)	41.1 (106.0)	40.2 (104.4)	36.7 (98.1)	36.9 (98.4)	29.8 (85.6)	22.6 (72.7)	15.9 (60.6)	41.1 (106.0)
Mean daily maximum °C (°F)	1.3 (34.3)	6.2 (43.2)	13.4 (56.1)	21.2 (70.2)	26.5 (79.7)	30.4 (86.7)	31.4 (88.5)	29.1 (84.4)	24.0 (75.2)	17.9 (64.2)	10.1 (50.2)	2.9 (37.2)	17.9 (64.2)
Daily mean °C (°F)	−7.3 (18.9)	−2.3 (27.9)	4.9 (40.8)	12.7 (54.9)	18.5 (65.3)	23.0 (73.4)	24.7 (76.5)	22.4 (72.3)	16.8 (62.2)	9.7 (49.5)	1.9 (35.4)	−5.1 (22.8)	10.0 (50.0)
Mean daily minimum °C (°F)	−13.1 (8.4)	−8.3 (17.1)	−1.7 (28.9)	5.1 (41.2)	10.7 (51.3)	15.6 (60.1)	18.8 (65.8)	17.4 (63.3)	11.7 (53.1)	4.2 (39.6)	−3.3 (26.1)	−10.3 (13.5)	3.9 (39.0)
Record low °C (°F)	−25.7 (−14.3)	−22.0 (−7.6)	−16.1 (3.0)	−6.3 (20.7)	−0.9 (30.4)	6.2 (43.2)	10.3 (50.5)	6.6 (43.9)	−2.0 (28.4)	−10.1 (13.8)	−20.2 (−4.4)	−25.2 (−13.4)	−25.7 (−14.3)
Average precipitation mm (inches)	2.8 (0.11)	4.4 (0.17)	10.9 (0.43)	23.2 (0.91)	35.2 (1.39)	51.8 (2.04)	112.9 (4.44)	110.0 (4.33)	72.7 (2.86)	31.7 (1.25)	15.3 (0.60)	2.5 (0.10)	473.4 (18.63)
Average precipitation days (≥ 0.1 mm)	2.2	2.8	3.6	5.0	6.8	9.0	11.7	11.0	9.3	6.6	3.9	1.7	73.6
Average snowy days	3.1	3.3	1.6	0.3	0	0	0	0	0	0.1	1.7	2.4	12.5
Average relative humidity (%)	55	51	46	42	44	51	64	71	74	71	65	58	58
Mean monthly sunshine hours	197.7	188.4	223.6	239.6	268.9	259.2	241.8	229.4	191.0	198.3	191.0	191.5	2,620.4
Percentage possible sunshine	64	61	60	60	61	59	54	55	52	58	64	65	59
Source: China Meteorological Administration

== Transport ==
- Shenmu–Yan'an Railway
