= Suide County =

Suide County 绥德县 Suiteh
- County
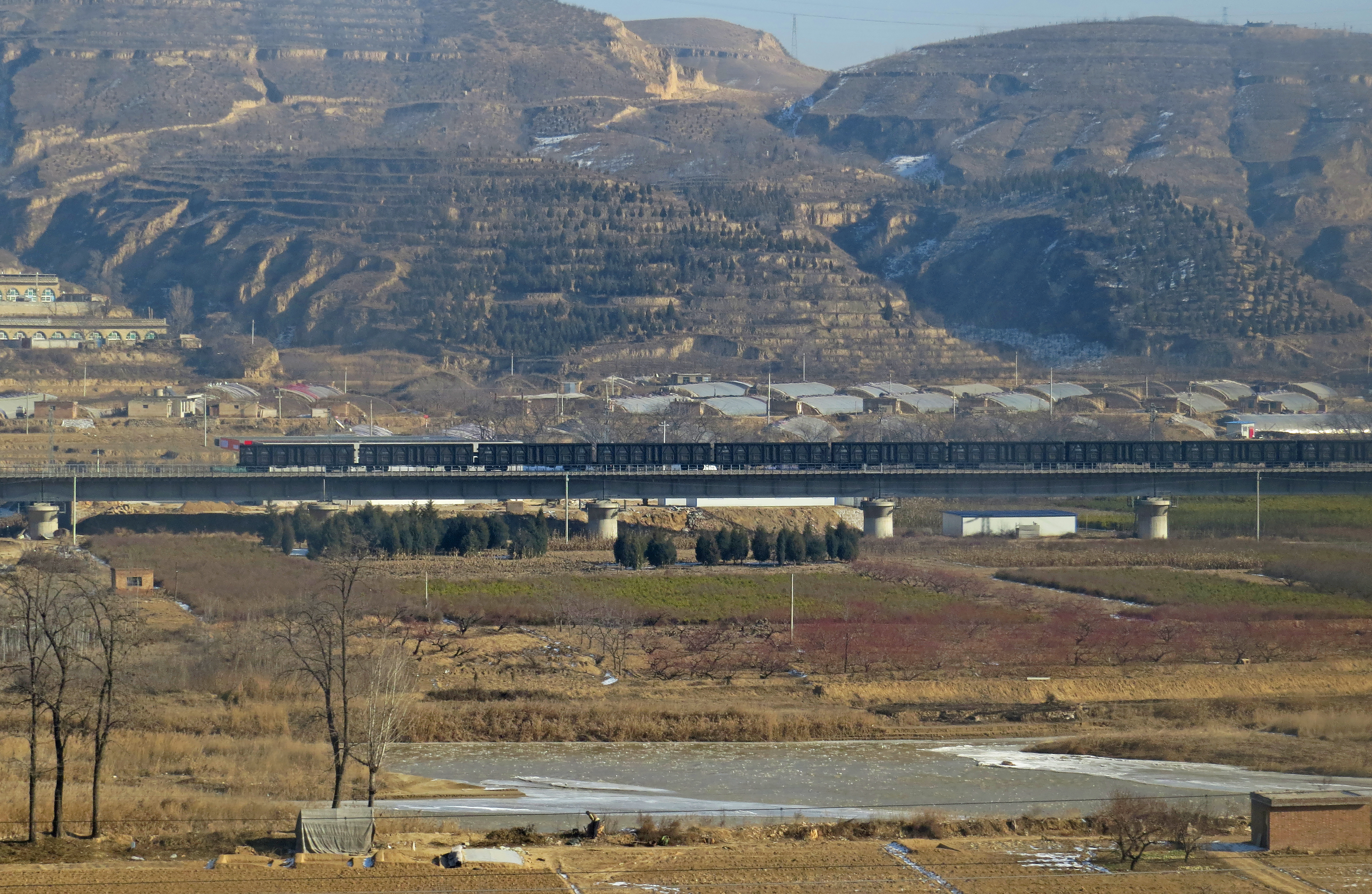
- Baotou–Xi'an Railway at Suide

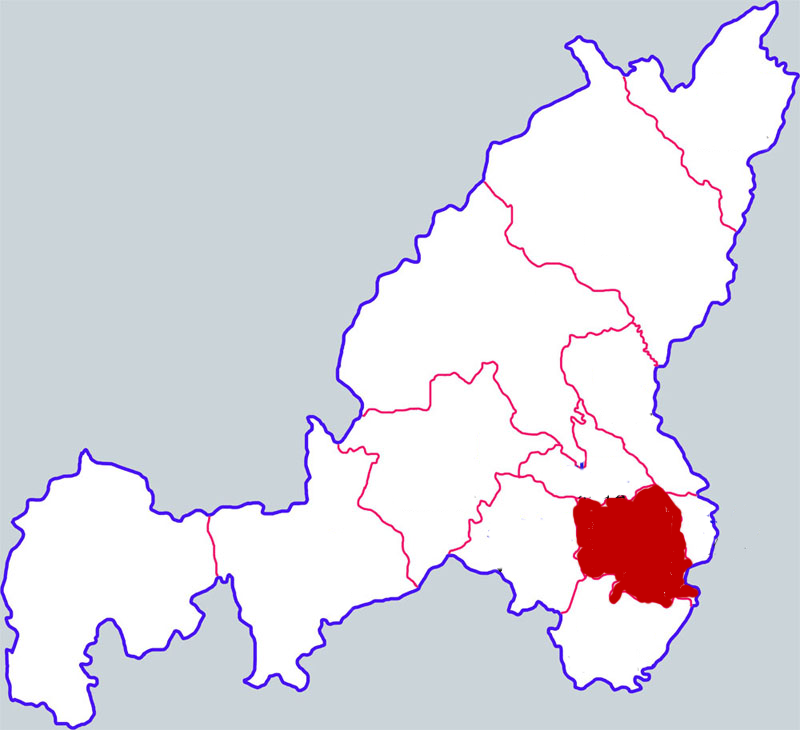
- Suide in Yulin

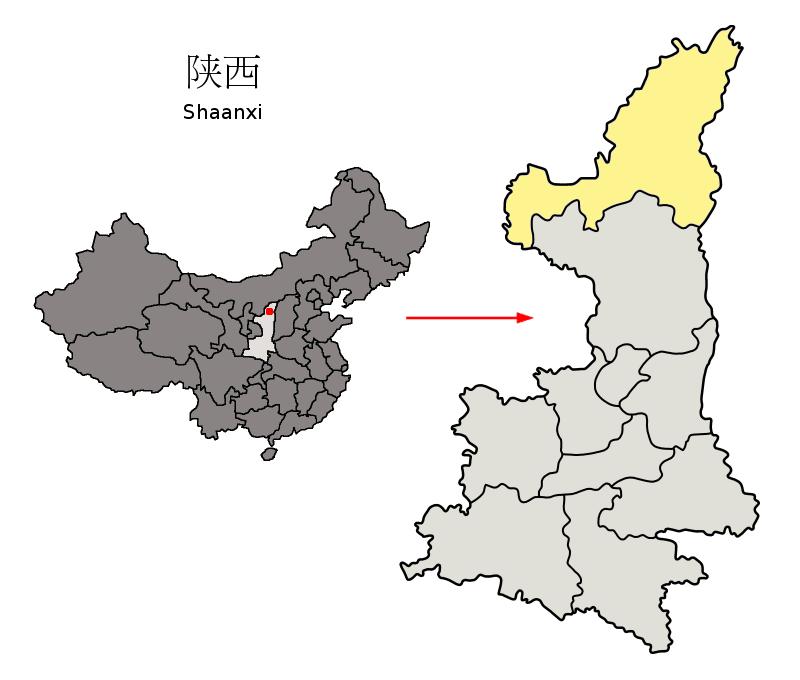
- Yulin in Shaanxi
- Coordinates: 37°30′11″N 110°15′47″E
- Country: People's Republic of China
- Province: Shaanxi
- Prefecture-level city: Yulin

Area
  - Total: 1,853 km^{2} (715 sq mi)

Population (2019)
  - Total: 352,579
  - Density: 190.3/km^{2} (492.8/sq mi)
- Time zone: UTC+8 (China standard time)
- Postal code: 718000
- Licence plates: 陕K

Suide County (simplified Chinese: 绥德县; traditional Chinese: 綏德縣; pinyin: Suídé Xiàn) is a county of Yulin, Shaanxi, China, bordering Shanxi province across the Yellow River to the southeast.

== Administrative divisions ==
As of 2019, Suide County is divided to 15 towns.

Towns

- Mingzhou (名州镇)
- Xuejiamao (薛家峁镇)
- Cuijiawan (崔家湾镇)
- Dingxianchi (定仙墕镇)
- Zaolinping (枣林坪镇)
- Yihe (义合镇)
- Ji (吉镇)
- Xuejiahe (薛家河镇)
- Sishilipu (四十里铺镇)
- Shijiawan (石家湾镇)
- Tianzhuang (田庄镇)
- Zhongjiao (中角镇)
- Mantangchuan (满堂川镇)
- Zhangjiayun (张家砭镇)
- Baijianai (白家硷镇)

== Climate ==
Climate data for Suide, elevation 930 m (3,050 ft), (1991–2020 normals, extremes 1981–2010)
Month	Jan	Feb	Mar	Apr	May	Jun	Jul	Aug	Sep	Oct	Nov	Dec	Year
Record high °C (°F)	12.4 (54.3)	17.9 (64.2)	28.2 (82.8)	36.3 (97.3)	37.0 (98.6)	40.5 (104.9)	39.3 (102.7)	36.7 (98.1)	36.7 (98.1)	29.0 (84.2)	21.4 (70.5)	13.9 (57.0)	40.5 (104.9)
Mean daily maximum °C (°F)	0.1 (32.2)	5.5 (41.9)	12.8 (55.0)	20.6 (69.1)	26.0 (78.8)	30.1 (86.2)	30.8 (87.4)	28.4 (83.1)	23.3 (73.9)	17.0 (62.6)	9.0 (48.2)	1.6 (34.9)	17.1 (62.8)
Daily mean °C (°F)	−6.7 (19.9)	−1.6 (29.1)	5.6 (42.1)	13.1 (55.6)	18.8 (65.8)	23.1 (73.6)	24.6 (76.3)	22.5 (72.5)	17.1 (62.8)	10.2 (50.4)	2.4 (36.3)	−4.8 (23.4)	10.4 (50.7)
Mean daily minimum °C (°F)	−12.1 (10.2)	−7.3 (18.9)	−0.7 (30.7)	6.2 (43.2)	11.8 (53.2)	16.6 (61.9)	19.2 (66.6)	17.7 (63.9)	12.3 (54.1)	5.0 (41.0)	−2.7 (27.1)	−9.8 (14.4)	4.7 (40.4)
Record low °C (°F)	−24.1 (−11.4)	−21.0 (−5.8)	−15.4 (4.3)	−5.4 (22.3)	0.2 (32.4)	8.2 (46.8)	12.7 (54.9)	9.1 (48.4)	−0.6 (30.9)	−8.2 (17.2)	−20.0 (−4.0)	−23.9 (−11.0)	−24.1 (−11.4)
Average precipitation mm (inches)	3.4 (0.13)	5.1 (0.20)	10.6 (0.42)	22.3 (0.88)	31.6 (1.24)	42.4 (1.67)	104.2 (4.10)	100.5 (3.96)	72.0 (2.83)	30.9 (1.22)	15.3 (0.60)	2.4 (0.09)	440.7 (17.34)
Average precipitation days (≥ 0.1 mm)	2.3	2.5	3.7	5.1	6.5	8.5	11.2	10.7	8.8	6.9	3.8	1.6	71.6
Average snowy days	3.3	3.1	1.8	0.4	0	0	0	0	0	0.2	1.8	2.9	13.5
Average relative humidity (%)	54	49	43	41	43	50	64	70	72	67	61	55	56
Mean monthly sunshine hours	199.4	193.2	232.3	252.4	279.6	267.2	246.4	227.2	194.4	201.1	189.7	199.4	2,682.3
Percentage possible sunshine	65	63	62	64	63	61	55	55	53	59	63	67	61
Source: China Meteorological Administration

== Transportation ==
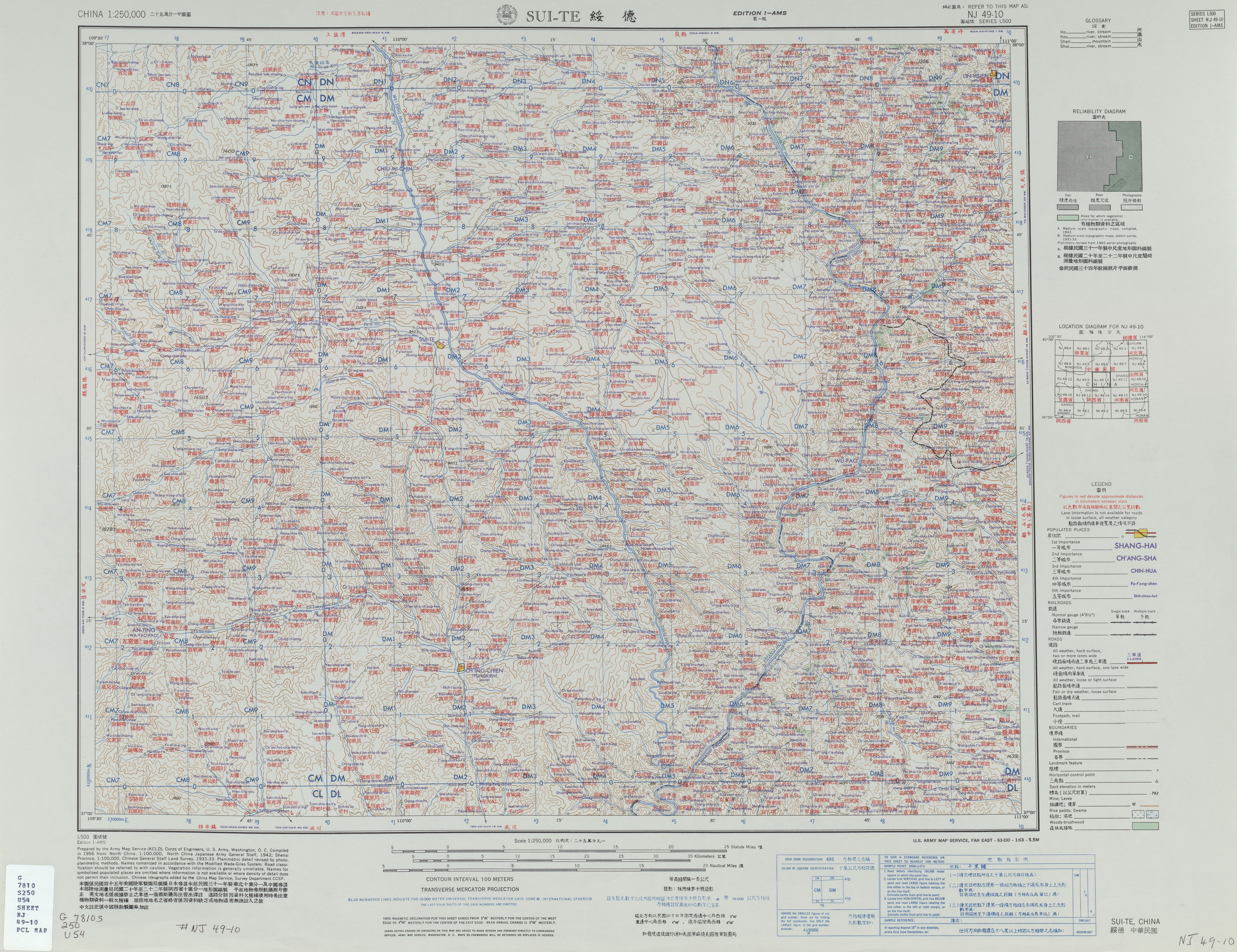
Map including Suide (labeled as SUI-TE (walled) 綏德) (AMS, 1956)

- China National Highway 210
- China National Highway 307
- Wuding Expressway
- Taizhongyin Railway
- Shenyan Railway
