= G6512 Xiushan–Congjiang Expressway =

Road in China

Xiushan–Congjiang Expressway
- 秀山－从江高速公路
- Xiucong Expressway 秀从高速公路

Route information
- Auxiliary route of G65
- Length: 395.84 km (245.96 mi)

Major junctions
- North end: G65 in Xiushan Tujia and Miao Autonomous County, Chongqing
- South end: G76 / G242 / S202 in Congjiang County, Qiandongnan Miao and Dong Autonomous Prefecture, Guizhou

Location
- Country: China

Highway system
- National Trunk Highway System; Primary; Auxiliary; National Highways; Transport in China
← G6511	→ G6517

The G6512 Xiushan–Congjiang Expressway (Chinese: 秀山—从江高速公路), also referred to as the Xiucong Expressway (Chinese: 秀从高速公路), is an expressway in China that connects Xiushan, Chongqing to Congjiang, Guizhou.

== Route ==
=== Chongqing ===
The S21 Xiusong Expressway, formerly numbered S63, is an expressway in Chongqing that is part of the Xiucong Expressway. It starts at the Xiushan East Hub and ends at the border between Chongqing and Guizhou. It is 30.6 km (19.0 mi) long and was opened to traffic on 23 December 2016.

=== Guizhou (north section) ===
The S15 Songtong Expressway starts at the Chongqing-Guizhou provincial boundary, passes through Songtao Miao Autonomous County, and connects with the G56 Hangzhou–Ruili Expressway in Daxing Subdistrict. It then runs concurrently with the G56 to Tongren. Construction began on 28 November 2013, and it was officially opened to traffic on 26 December 2014. It is 50.38 km (31.30 mi) long, with a total investment of approximately ¥5.73 billion RMB.

The S15 Tongda Expressway starts in Bijiang District and connects to the G60 Shanghai–Kunming Expressway in Yuping Dong Autonomous County, with a total length of 56 km (35 mi). Construction began on 29 December 2009, and it was completed and opened to traffic on 28 October 2012.

=== Hunan ===
The route in Hunan is currently under planning with an estimated cost of ¥3.8 billion RMB for the 36 km (22 mi) section. Construction is scheduled to start in June 2025 and take three years to complete.

=== Guizhou (south section) ===
The S15 Sanli Expressway is 138.07 km (85.79 mi) and connects Tianzhu County to Liping County. Construction started on 28 November 2010 and was officially opened to traffic on 23 January 2015 with a total cost of about ¥10.2 billion RMB.

The S15 Liluo Expressway starts in Liping County, and Congjiang County, where it connects with the G76 Xiamen–Chengdu Expressway. Construction began on 21 September 2009 and it was officially opened to traffic on 16 August 2012. The entire route is 50.4 km (31.3 mi) long, with a total investment of approximately ¥4 billion RMB.
