= G2211 Changzhi–Yan'an Expressway =

Road in China

Changzhi–Yan'an Expressway
- 长治－延安高速公路
- Changyan Expressway 长延高速公路

Route information
- Auxiliary route of G22

Major junctions
- West end: G65 / G6522 in Ansai District, Yan'an, Shaanxi
- East end: G22 in Licheng County, Changzhi, Shanxi

Location
- Country: China

Highway system
- National Trunk Highway System; Primary; Auxiliary; National Highways; Transport in China
← G2201	→ G25

The G2211 Changzhi–Yan'an Expressway (Chinese: 长治至延安高速公路), also referred to as the Changyan Expressway (Chinese: 长延高速公路), is an expressway in China that connects the cities of Changzhi, Shanxi and Yan'an, Shaanxi.

== Route ==
The expressway begins in Licheng County, Changzhi, and passes through Huozhou, Yonghe County, Yanchuan County, and ends in Ansai District, Yan'an. The route passes through the provinces of Shanxi and Shaanxi.
