= Tongren (disambiguation) =

Tongren (铜仁市) is a prefecture-level city in Guizhou province, China.

Tongren may also refer to:

- Tongren, Qinghai (同仁市), a county-level city of Huangnan Tibetan Autonomous Prefecture
- Bijiang District, formerly the county-level Tongren City, now a district of Tongren, Guizhou

Tong Ren may refer to:

- Hexagram 13 (同人; tóng rén) of the I Ching

== See also ==
- Doujin
- Tong Ren Tang, Chinese pharmaceutical company founded in 1669
- Tongeren, Belgium
