= G6521 Yulin–Lantian Expressway =

Expressway in China

Yulin–Lantian Expressway
- 榆林－蓝田高速公路
- Yulan Expressway

Route information
- Existed: July 4, 2021–present

Major junctions
- From: Suide County
- To: Yushan, Lantian County

Location
- Country: China
- Province: Shaanxi
- Counties: Suide County, Yanchuan County, Yanchang County, Yichuan County, Huanglong County, Baishui County, Pucheng County, Lantian County

Highway system
- National Trunk Highway System; Primary; Auxiliary; National Highways; Transport in China
← G6517	→ G6522

The G6521 Yulan Expressway (Chinese: 榆蓝高速公路; pinyin: Yú lán gāosù gōnglù), also known as the Yulin-Lantian Expressway (Chinese: 榆林蓝田高速公路; pinyin: Yúlín Lántián gāosù gōnglù), is an expressway travelling from Yulin to Lantian County in Xi'an. It runs parallel to the G65 Baotou-Maoming Expressway.

The Yulan Expressway runs south from Suide County in Yulin through Yanchuan County, Yanchang County, Yichuan County, Huanglong County, Baishui County, and Pucheng County, before terminating in Yushan, Lantian County.

== History ==
On September 29, 2012, the first portion of the expressway, in Suide County, was opened to traffic. On January 19, 2020, the portion between Baishui County and Pucheng County in Weinan was opened to traffic. The Yulan Expressway was fully completed on July 4, 2021, when the section from Yanchang County to Huanglong County was completed, reducing travel time from the two counties from 4 hours to 2 hours.
