= G6522 Yan'an–Xi'an Expressway =

Expressway in Shaanxi, China

Yan'an–Xi'an Expressway
- 延安－西安高速公路
- Yanxi Expressway 延西高速公路

Route information
- Auxiliary route of G65

Major junctions
- North end: G65 / G2211 in Ansai District, Yan'an, Shaanxi
- South end: G3002 in Weiyang District, Xi'an, Shaanxi

Location
- Country: China

Highway system
- National Trunk Highway System; Primary; Auxiliary; National Highways; Transport in China
← G6521	→ G69

The G6522 Yan'an–Xi'an Expressway (Chinese: 延安至西安高速公路), also referred to as the Yanxi Expressway (Chinese: 延西高速公路), is an expressway in Shaanxi, China that connects the cities of Yan'an and Xi'an.

== Route ==
The expressway starts in Ansai District, Yan'an and passes through Fuxian, Luochuan, Yijun, Tongchuan, and the end point is in Weiyang District, Xi'an.

=== Xi'an to Tongchuan ===
The Xitong Expressway starts from the Luxiaozhai Interchange of the Xi'an Ring Expressway, passes through Weiyang District, Gaoling District, Jingyang County, Sanyuan County to Tongchuan New District, with a total length of 62.8 kilometers. Construction started in January 2009 and was officially opened to traffic on 8 December 2011.

=== Tongchuan to Huangling ===
Referred to as the Tonghuang Expressway, it starts from Tongchuan New District, passes through Yaozhou District, Wangyi District, Yintai District, and Yijun County of Tongchuan, and ends in Huangling County, Yan'an, with a total length of 102.2 kilometers. Construction started in April 2010 and opened to traffic on 17 October 2015.

=== Huangling to Yan'an ===
The Huangyan Expressway starts from Yatou Village, Yijun County, Tongchuan, passes through Huangling County, Fu County, and Ganquan County, Yan'an, and ends at the south side of Yanhewan Town, Ansai County, Yan'an, with a total length of 153.9 kilometers. It was completed and opened to traffic on 12 September 2016.
