= Spelaeus =

Scientific classification
- Kingdom: Animalia
- Phylum: Arthropoda
- Subphylum: Chelicerata
- Class: Arachnida
- Order: Araneae
- Infraorder: Araneomorphae
- Family: Linyphiidae
- Genus: Spelaeus; Irfan, Zhang & Peng, 2025
- Species: S. cicatrix

Binomial name
- Spelaeus cicatrix Irfan, Zhang & Peng, 2025

Species of spider

Spelaeus is a monotypic genus of spiders in the family Linyphiidae containing the single species, Spelaeus cicatrix.

== Distribution ==
Spelaeus cicatrix has only been recorded from Niujiao Cave near Tongren City, Guizhou Province, China.

== Etymology ==
The genus name is from Latin spelaeum "cave", as the species was found in Niujiao Cave.

The specific name means "scar" in Latin, referring to scars found at the anterior half of the female epigyne. These scars were found in the majority of females. The authors suggest that these might be a result of the mating process.
