= G6517 Wuzhou–Liuzhou Expressway =

Road in China

Wuzhou–Liuzhou Expressway
- 梧州－柳州高速公路
- Wuliu Expressway 梧柳高速公路

Route information
- Auxiliary route of G65
- Length: 212.55 km (132.07 mi)

Major junctions
- West end: G72 / Guangxi S3101 in Yufeng District, Liuzhou, Guangxi
- East end: G65 / Guangxi S4001 in Changzhou District, Wuzhou, Guangxi

Location
- Country: China

Highway system
- National Trunk Highway System; Primary; Auxiliary; National Highways; Transport in China
← G6512	→ G6521

The G6517 Wuzhou–Liuzhou Expressway (Chinese: 梧州—柳州高速公路), also referred to as the Wuliu Expressway (Chinese: 梧柳高速公路), is an expressway in Guangxi, China that connects Wuzhou to Liuzhou. Construction of the expressway started on 29 December 2011, and it was fully opened to traffic on 22 December 2017.

== Route ==
The expressway starts in Changzhou, before passing through Cangwu, Teng, Pingnan, Jinxiu, Xiangzhou and Luzhai, before terminating in Yufeng. The total length is 212.55 km (132.07 mi) with a design speed of 100–120 km/h (62–75 mph).
