= G6023 Nanchang–Fenghuang Expressway =

Road in China

Nanchang–Fenghuang Expressway
- 南昌－凤凰高速公路
- Nanfeng Expressway 南凤高速公路

Route information
- Auxiliary route of G60

Major junctions
- West end: G65 in Fenghuang County, Xiangxi Tujia and Miao Autonomous Prefecture, Hunan
- East end: G0401 / Hunan S41 in Xinjian District, Nanchang, Jiangxi

Location
- Country: China

Highway system
- National Trunk Highway System; Primary; Auxiliary; National Highways; Transport in China
← G6022	→ G6025

The G6023 Nanchang–Fenghuang Expressway (Chinese: 南昌—凤凰高速公路), also referred to as the Nanfeng Expressway (Chinese: 南凤高速公路), is an expressway in China that connects Nanchang, Jiangxi to Fenghuang, Hunan.

== Route ==
The expressway starts in Nanchang, passes through Gao'an, Wanzai, Changsha, Loudi, Xupu, and ends in Fenghuang. The route runs parallel to the G60 Shanghai–Kunming Expressway and it travels through the provinces of Hunan and Jiangxi.
