= Huanglong walnut =

Variety of tree

- Genus: Juglans
- Species: Juglans regia

The Huanglong walnut (Chinese: 黄龙核桃) is a Chinese variety of walnut tree native to Huanglong County, Yan'an City, Shaanxi Province. This species has been cultivated in China for over 2000 years. It is a deciduous tree, up to 35 meters tall, flowering in March to April and fruiting in August to September in the Northern Hemisphere.
