= G2201 Lanzhou Ring Expressway =

Expressway in Lanzhou, China

Lanzhou Ring Expressway
- 兰州绕城高速公路

Route information
- Length: 58.743 km (36.501 mi)
- Existed: 2018–present

Major junctions
- G22 Yuzhong County; G309 in Heping, Yuzhong; G75 in Xiguoyuan, Qilihe District; Nanshan Road in Xigu District; G6 in Xigu District

Location
- Country: China

Highway system
- National Trunk Highway System; Primary; Auxiliary; National Highways; Transport in China
← G2012	→ G2211

The Lanzhou South Ring Expressway (Chinese: 兰州南绕城高速; pinyin: Lánzhōu Nán Ràochéng Gāosù), designated G2201, is a 58.743-kilometre-long expressway (36.501 mi) that bypasses the built-up area of Lanzhou on the south side, the capital of Gansu Province. The design speed of the road is 80 kilometres per hour (50 mph). Construction started in 2014 and the Expressway was opened on 29 December 2018. The construction cost was budgeted at 11.8 billion yuan.

Together with the northern bypass formed by G6 Beijing–Lhasa Expressway and G30 Lianyungang–Khorgas Expressway, it forms a full Expressway Ring Road around Lanzhou. The Lanzhou North Ring Road forms an inner ring road, although it is not built to Expressway standards. Before opening of the Expressway, all traffic from the directions of Linxia and Lintao County over G75 Lanzhou–Haikou Expressway terminated in the built up area of Lanzhou with few grade-separated junctions. The terminus of G75 is at a toll station on a long downward slop, with many hundreds of incidents involving brake failure of heavy trucks taking place. Heavy trucks are since required to use the Ring Expressway, avoiding the hazardous situation.

Lanzhou South Service Area is the largest service area in Gansu province.

== Engineering works ==
External image
- Xigu Yellow River Bridge

The expressway runs through mountainous loess landscape. The road runs over 20 bridges, and through 17 tunnels, 58.4% of the length is made up by bridges and tunnels. By far the largest bridge is Xigu Yellow River Bridge, a 1,003 metres (3,291 ft) long dual-tower cable-stayed bridge crossing the Yellow River at 70 metres (230 ft) above the water.

== Exit list ==
Location	km	mi	Exit	Name	Destinations	Notes
Yuzhong County, Lanzhou			C1	Dingyuan Interchange	G22	
Yuzhong County, Lanzhou			7	Heping South	G309	
Qilihe District, Lanzhou	Lanzhou South Service Area					
Qilihe District, Lanzhou			24	Xiguoyuan	G75	HGV may only exit southbound
Xigu District, Lanzhou			37	Xigu Nanshan Road		
Xigu District, Lanzhou			56	Huangyanggou Interchange	G6	
Closed/former; Concurrency terminus; HOV only; Incomplete access; Tolled; Route transition; Unopened
