= Zichang =

Zichang 子长市 Tzechang
- County-level city
- Zichang in Yan'an

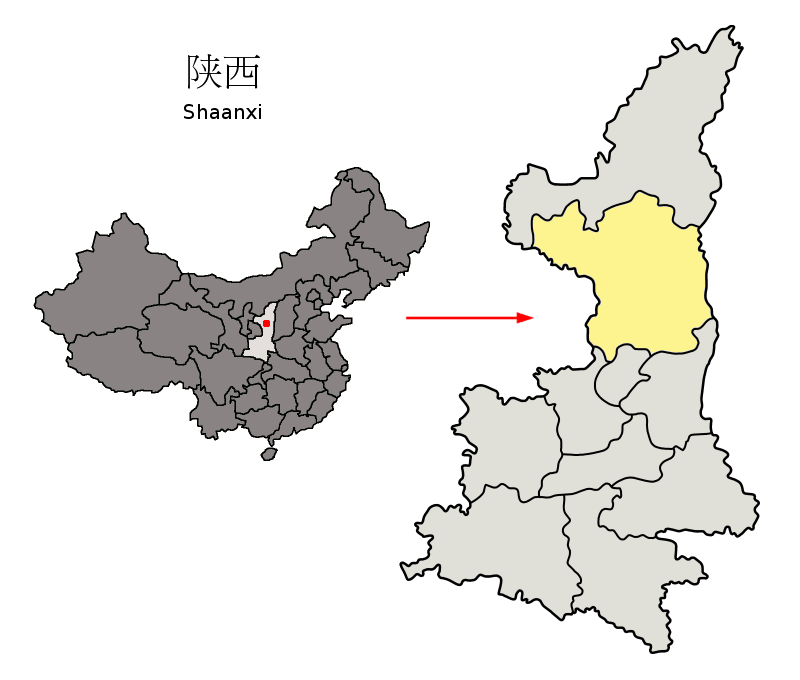
- Yan'an in Shaanxi
- Coordinates (Zichang municipal government): 37°08′34″N 109°40′31″E
- Country: People's Republic of China
- Province: Shaanxi
- Prefecture-level city: Yan'an

Area
  - Total: 2,393.4 km^{2} (924.1 sq mi)

Population (2017)
  - Total: 273,000
  - Density: 114/km^{2} (295/sq mi)
- Time zone: UTC+8 (China standard time)

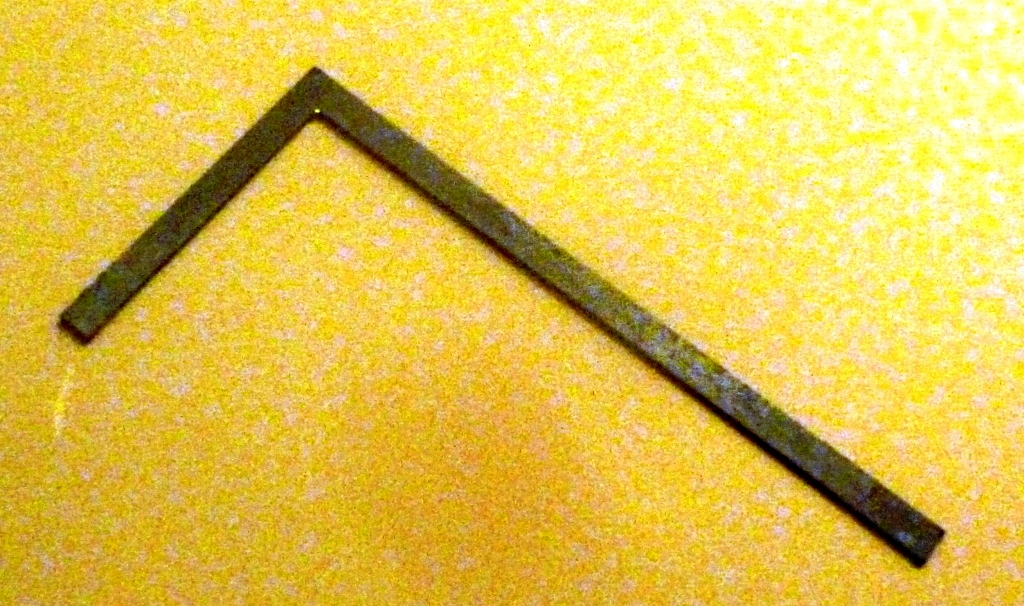
Bronze ruler. Han dynasty, 206 BCE to CE 220. Excavated in Zichang City.

Zichang (simplified Chinese: 子长市; traditional Chinese: 子長市; pinyin: Zǐcháng Shì) is a city in the north of Shaanxi province (Shaanbei), China. It is the northernmost county-level division of the prefecture-level city of Yan'an. Zichang had a population of 273,000 as of 2017, of which, 115,000 lived in urban areas.

== Administrative divisions ==
Zichang is divided into 1 subdistrict and 8 towns.

=== Wayaobu Subdistrict ===
The city's sole subdistrict is Wayaobu Subdistrict (瓦窑堡街道; Wǎyáobǔ Jiēdào). The subdistrict is the seat of the city's administrative offices.

=== Towns ===
Zichang's eight towns are as follows:

- Yangjiayuanze (杨家园则镇; Yángjiāyuánzé Zhèn)
- Yujiawan (玉家湾镇; Yùjiāwān Zhèn)
- Anding (安定镇; Āndìng Zhèn)
- Majiabian (马家砭镇; Mǎjiābiān Zhèn)
- Nangoucha (南沟岔镇; Nángōuchà Zhèn)
- Jianyucha (涧峪岔镇; Jiànyùchà Zhèn)
- Lijiacha (李家岔镇; Lǐjiāchà Zhèn)
- Yujiaping (余家坪镇; Yújiāpíng Zhèn)

== Climate ==
Climate data for Zichang, elevation 1,063 m (3,488 ft), (1991–2020 normals, extremes 1981–2010)
Month	Jan	Feb	Mar	Apr	May	Jun	Jul	Aug	Sep	Oct	Nov	Dec	Year
Record high °C (°F)	16.4 (61.5)	23.7 (74.7)	28.1 (82.6)	35.9 (96.6)	36.3 (97.3)	39.0 (102.2)	38.0 (100.4)	35.5 (95.9)	36.6 (97.9)	29.9 (85.8)	24.5 (76.1)	16.4 (61.5)	39.0 (102.2)
Mean daily maximum °C (°F)	1.8 (35.2)	6.3 (43.3)	12.8 (55.0)	20.2 (68.4)	25.2 (77.4)	29.1 (84.4)	29.9 (85.8)	27.8 (82.0)	23.0 (73.4)	17.2 (63.0)	10.2 (50.4)	3.4 (38.1)	17.2 (63.0)
Daily mean °C (°F)	−6.0 (21.2)	−1.6 (29.1)	5.0 (41.0)	12.3 (54.1)	17.7 (63.9)	21.9 (71.4)	23.5 (74.3)	21.6 (70.9)	16.2 (61.2)	9.5 (49.1)	2.4 (36.3)	−4.2 (24.4)	9.9 (49.7)
Mean daily minimum °C (°F)	−11.6 (11.1)	−7.4 (18.7)	−1.3 (29.7)	5.1 (41.2)	10.4 (50.7)	15.0 (59.0)	18.0 (64.4)	16.7 (62.1)	11.4 (52.5)	4.3 (39.7)	−2.8 (27.0)	−9.4 (15.1)	4.0 (39.3)
Record low °C (°F)	−23.6 (−10.5)	−19.5 (−3.1)	−16.1 (3.0)	−6.5 (20.3)	−0.9 (30.4)	6.4 (43.5)	11.1 (52.0)	8.0 (46.4)	−0.5 (31.1)	−8.1 (17.4)	−20.5 (−4.9)	−24.1 (−11.4)	−24.1 (−11.4)
Average precipitation mm (inches)	3.4 (0.13)	5.1 (0.20)	10.4 (0.41)	24.8 (0.98)	36.7 (1.44)	56.9 (2.24)	122.1 (4.81)	115.8 (4.56)	75.7 (2.98)	33.1 (1.30)	14.1 (0.56)	2.2 (0.09)	500.3 (19.7)
Average precipitation days (≥ 0.1 mm)	2.3	2.8	3.9	5.5	7.0	9.3	12.6	11.2	9.6	7.3	3.7	1.6	76.8
Average snowy days	3.8	3.7	2.2	0.5	0	0	0	0	0	0.3	2.0	2.9	15.4
Average relative humidity (%)	53	50	47	44	48	55	68	74	75	70	62	54	58
Mean monthly sunshine hours	189.8	181.6	212.6	229.2	252.8	238.6	219.8	209.9	179.0	192.1	184.2	188.0	2,477.6
Percentage possible sunshine	62	59	57	58	57	54	50	50	49	56	61	63	56
Source: China Meteorological Administration

== History ==
Formerly called Anding County (安定县; Āndìng Xiàn), it was renamed in 1942 to Zichang County (子长县; Zǐcháng Xiàn) to commemorate the Communist martyr Xie Zichang. On July 25, 2019, the province re-organized the county as a county-level city.

== Economy ==
In 2017, the city's GDP was valued at 9.719 billion yuan.

=== Agriculture ===
The city's agricultural sector had an output of 1.288 billion yuan in 2017. Major crops include millet, wheat, corn, beans, and potatoes. The city's "mountain apples" and potatoes have been recognized for being of outstanding quality.

=== Industry ===
Zichang's industry is largely dependent on natural resources such as coal and petroleum. In 2017, the city produced 11.52 million tons of raw coal and 745,000 tons of crude oil.

== Transportation ==
The city is served by a number of road and rail links. Key roads which pass through the city include Shaanxi Provincial Road 205, and the G6511 Ansai–Qingjian Expressway. The city's railway station, Zichang railway station, is served by the Baotou–Xi'an railway.
