= Yichuan County, Shaanxi =

Yichuan 宜川县 Ichwan
- County
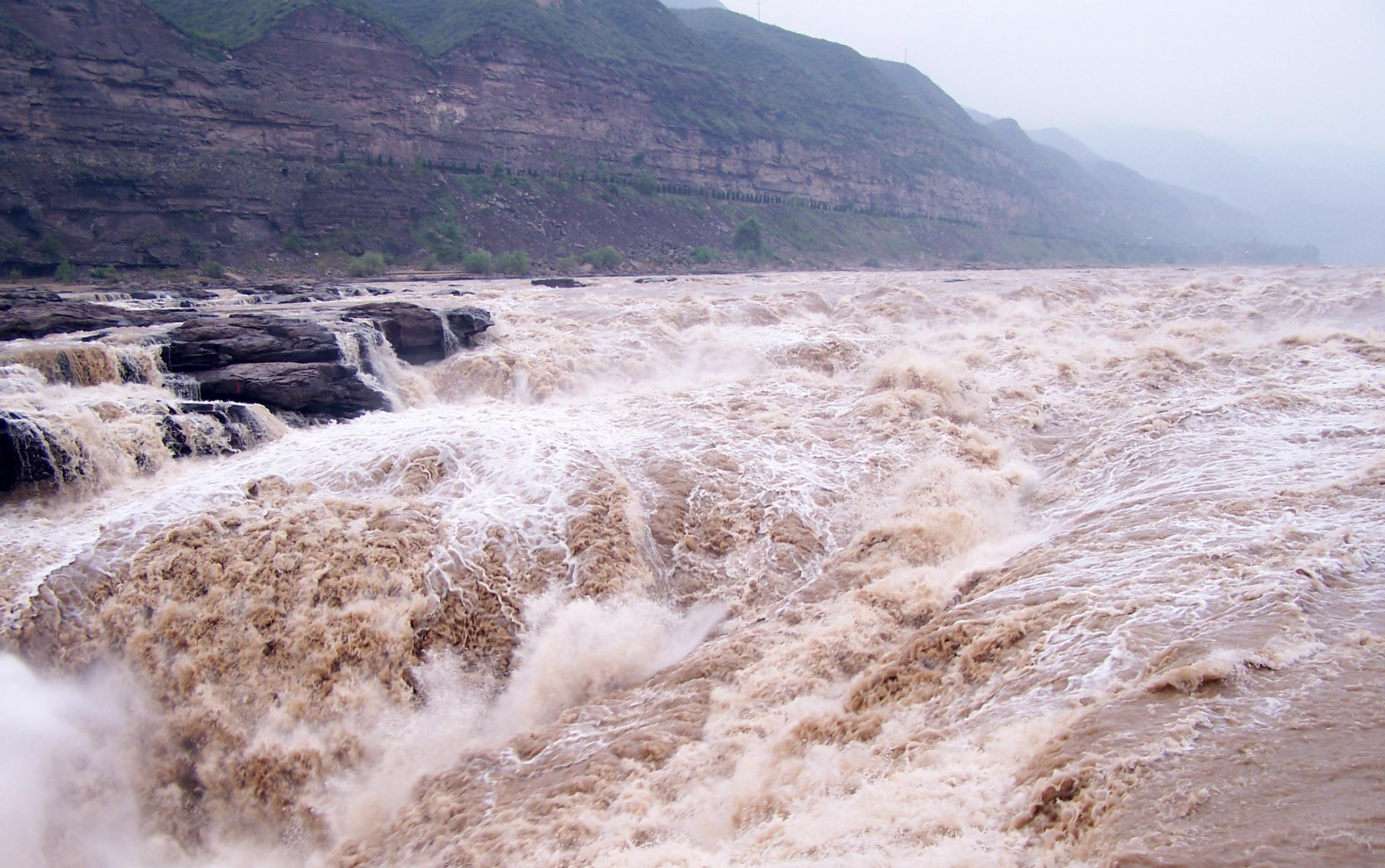
- Hukou Waterfall

- Yichuan in Yan'an

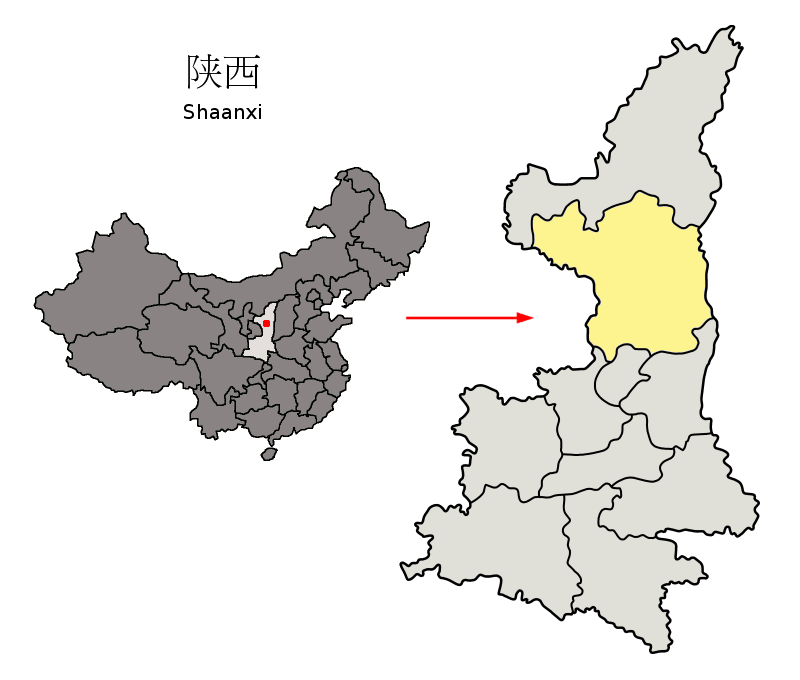
- Yan'an in Shaanxi
- Coordinates: 36°03′01″N 110°10′08″E
- Country: People's Republic of China
- Province: Shaanxi
- Prefecture-level city: Yan'an

Area
  - Total: 2,937.2 km^{2} (1,134.1 sq mi)

Population (2012)
  - Total: 117,900
  - Density: 40.14/km^{2} (104.0/sq mi)
- Time zone: UTC+8 (China standard time)
- Postal code: 716200
- Licence plates: 陕J

Yichuan County (simplified Chinese: 宜川县; traditional Chinese: 宜川縣; pinyin: Yíchuān Xiàn) is a county in northern Shaanxi Province, China, bordering Shanxi province to the east across the Yellow River. It is under the administration of the prefecture-level city of Yan'an. The county spans an area of 2,937.2 square kilometres (1,134.1 mi^{2}), and has a population of 117,900 as of 2012.

== Administrative divisions ==
Yichuan County is divided into one subdistrict, four towns, and two townships. The county's sole subdistrict, Danzhou Subdistrict, is the site of the county government. The county's four towns are Qiulin, Yunyan, Jiyi, and Hukou. The county has two townships: Yingwang Township and Jiaoli Township.

== Geography ==
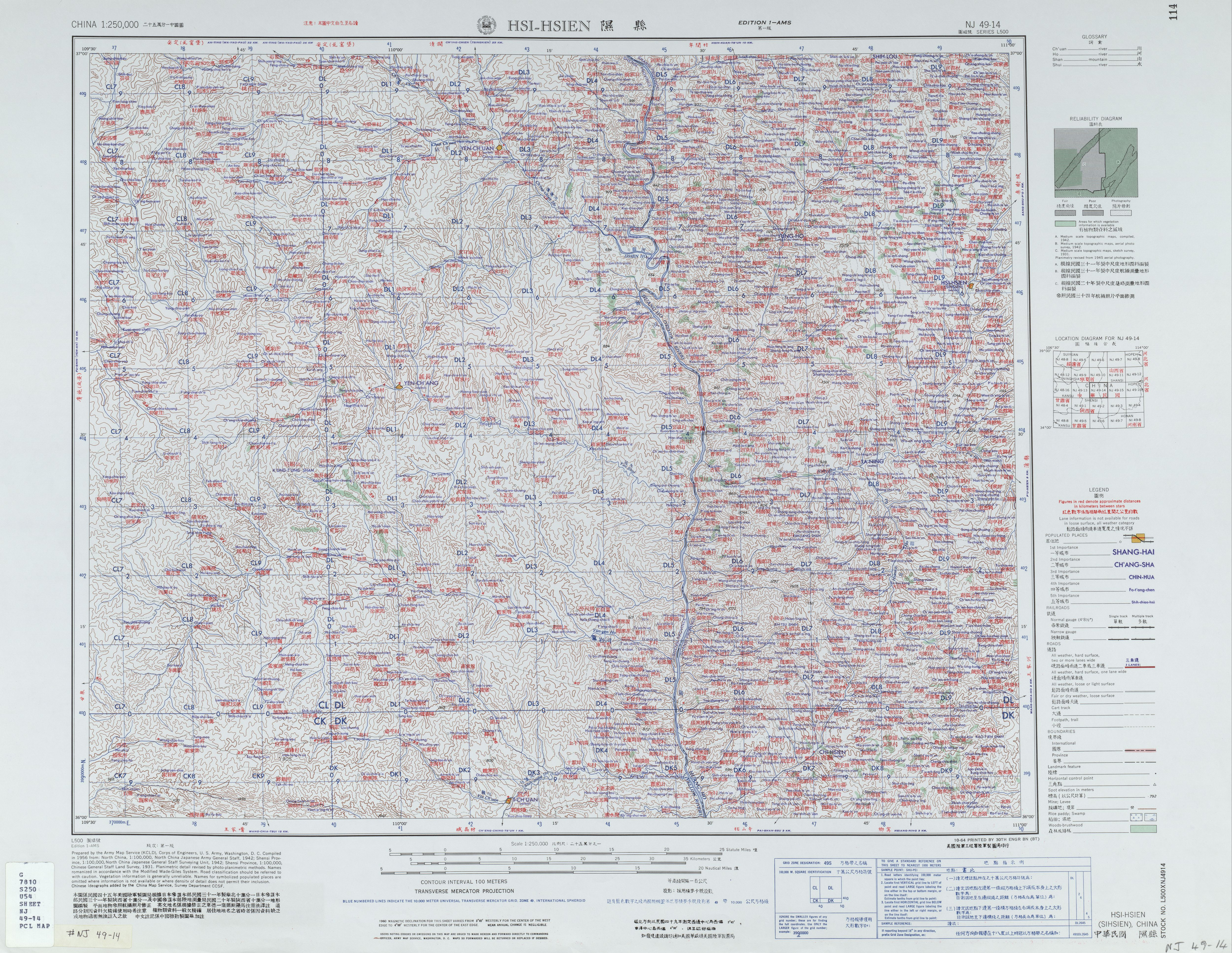
Map including Yichuan (labeled as I-CH'UAN (walled) 宜川) (AMS, 1956)

The county is located in northern Shaanxi, southeast of Yan'an's urban core. Yichuan County is part of the larger Loess Plateau. The Hukou Waterfall is located on the eastern border of the county.

=== Climate ===
The county has an average annual precipitation of 577.8 millimetres (22.75 in), and an average annual temperature of 10 °C (50 °F).

Climate data for Yichuan, elevation 840 m (2,760 ft), (1991–2020 normals, extremes 1981–2010)
Month	Jan	Feb	Mar	Apr	May	Jun	Jul	Aug	Sep	Oct	Nov	Dec	Year
Record high °C (°F)	16.2 (61.2)	22.2 (72.0)	29.3 (84.7)	37.4 (99.3)	37.9 (100.2)	39.7 (103.5)	40.0 (104.0)	37.1 (98.8)	38.3 (100.9)	31.1 (88.0)	24.7 (76.5)	19.8 (67.6)	40.0 (104.0)
Mean daily maximum °C (°F)	3.1 (37.6)	7.7 (45.9)	14.4 (57.9)	21.6 (70.9)	26.2 (79.2)	30.1 (86.2)	30.9 (87.6)	29.0 (84.2)	24.2 (75.6)	18.3 (64.9)	11.4 (52.5)	4.7 (40.5)	18.5 (65.3)
Daily mean °C (°F)	−4.7 (23.5)	−0.4 (31.3)	6.1 (43.0)	13.0 (55.4)	17.9 (64.2)	22.0 (71.6)	23.8 (74.8)	22.2 (72.0)	17.1 (62.8)	10.6 (51.1)	3.5 (38.3)	−3.0 (26.6)	10.7 (51.2)
Mean daily minimum °C (°F)	−10.1 (13.8)	−6.2 (20.8)	−0.4 (31.3)	5.7 (42.3)	10.5 (50.9)	15.1 (59.2)	18.3 (64.9)	17.3 (63.1)	12.2 (54.0)	5.3 (41.5)	−1.6 (29.1)	−8.2 (17.2)	4.8 (40.7)
Record low °C (°F)	−22.2 (−8.0)	−19.3 (−2.7)	−15.7 (3.7)	−6.3 (20.7)	−1.5 (29.3)	6.2 (43.2)	10.5 (50.9)	8.4 (47.1)	−0.6 (30.9)	−8.4 (16.9)	−18.0 (−0.4)	−23.3 (−9.9)	−23.3 (−9.9)
Average precipitation mm (inches)	4.3 (0.17)	6.3 (0.25)	12.7 (0.50)	30.7 (1.21)	47.5 (1.87)	61.8 (2.43)	120.8 (4.76)	97.6 (3.84)	73.9 (2.91)	42.8 (1.69)	16.1 (0.63)	2.8 (0.11)	517.3 (20.37)
Average precipitation days (≥ 0.1 mm)	2.9	3.2	4.5	6.6	8.5	9.0	12.5	11.4	10.4	8.2	5.0	2.1	84.3
Average snowy days	4.3	4.1	2.3	0.3	0	0	0	0	0	0.2	2.3	3.2	16.7
Average relative humidity (%)	54	53	49	49	53	59	70	75	74	70	62	55	60
Mean monthly sunshine hours	193.3	181.6	214.6	232.3	249.4	234.9	216.1	199.9	170.8	177.7	179.2	187.6	2,437.4
Percentage possible sunshine	62	59	57	59	57	54	49	48	47	52	59	63	56
Source: China Meteorological Administration

== History ==
In 1948, Peng Dehuai lead Communist Party forces to battle against the Kuomintang in the Battle of Yiwa, which took place in present-day Yingwang Township.

== Economy ==
The county has been recognized by the Chinese Ministry of Agriculture as being a significant site for Zanthoxylum.

== Culture ==
The county has been recognized by the Chinese Ministry of Culture for its unique chest-drums.

== Transportation ==
Key highways which pass through the county include the G22 Qingdao-Lanzhou Expressway, China National Highway 309, Shaanxi Provincial Road 201, Shaanxi Provincial Road 204, and Shaanxi Provincial Road 303. The total length of highways in the county totals 1,557.5 kilometers. The Haoji Railway also passes through Yichuan County.

== See also ==
- Hukou Waterfall
- Loess Plateau
- Northern Shaanxi
