= Fangzhai =

Fangzhai 房寨镇
- Town
- Fángzhài Zhèn
- Location in Hebei Location in China
- Coordinates: 36°31′12″N 115°11′48″E
- Country: People's Republic of China
- Province: Hebei
- Prefecture-level city: Handan
- County: Guantao

Area
  - Total: 43.87 km^{2} (16.94 sq mi)

Population (2010)
  - Total: 25,437
  - Density: 579.9/km^{2} (1,502/sq mi)
- Time zone: UTC+8 (China Standard)

Fangzhai (Chinese: 房寨镇; pinyin: Fángzhài Zhèn) is a town located in Guantao County, Handan, Hebei, China. According to the 2010 census, Fangzhai had a population of 25,437, including 12,397 males and 13,040 females. The population was distributed as follows: 5,810 people aged under 14, 17,426 people aged between 15 and 64, and 2,201 people aged over 65.

== See also ==
- List of township-level divisions of Hebei
