= Huanglong County =

Huanglong 黄龙县
- County
- Huanglong in Yan'an

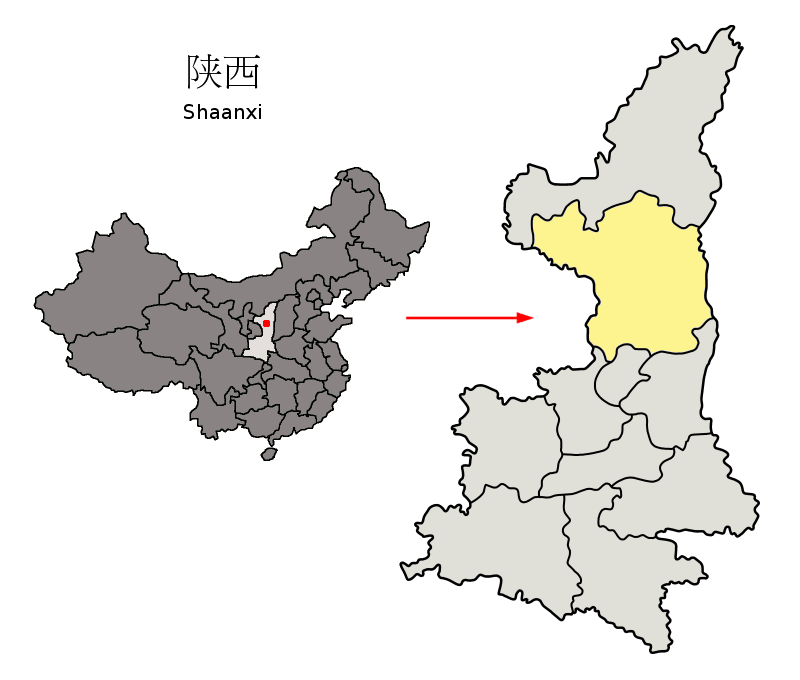
- Yan'an in Shaanxi
- Coordinates (Huanglong County People's Government): 35°35′05″N 109°50′25″E
- Country: People's Republic of China
- Province: Shaanxi
- Prefecture-level city: Yan'an

Area
  - Total: 2,751 km^{2} (1,062 sq mi)

Population (2012)
  - Total: 49,500
  - Density: 18.0/km^{2} (46.6/sq mi)
- Time zone: UTC+8 (China standard time)
- Postal code: 715700

Huanglong County (simplified Chinese: 黄龙县; traditional Chinese: 黃龍縣; pinyin: Huánglóng Xiàn; lit. 'yellow dragon') is a county of Yan'an, Shaanxi Province, China. Located in Northern Shaanxi, bordering Shanxi province to the east across the Yellow River, Huanglong County has an area of 2,751 square kilometres (1,062 mi^{2}), and a permanent population of 49,500 as of 2012.

== Administrative divisions ==
The county is divided into 5 towns and 2 townships. Huanglong County's five towns are Shibao, Baimatan, Wazijie, Jietoumiao, and Sancha. Huanglong County's two townships are Getai Township and Yaoxian Township. The county's government offices are located in Shibao Town.

== Geography ==
Huanglong County is located approximately 221 kilometres (137 mi) from Yan'an's urban core, and 226 kilometres (140 mi) from Xi'an's urban core. Located in the Loess Plateau, Huanglong County is hilly in elevation, ranging from 643.7 metres (2,112 ft) to 1,738 metres (5,702 ft) in height. A number of minor rivers run through the county. 87% of Huanglong County is forested, and the county is home to 1,012 species of plants and 225 species of animals.

=== Climate ===
The area experiences an average annual rainfall of 602.7 millimetres (23.73 in), and an average annual temperature of 8.6 °C (47.5 °F).

Climate data for Huanglong, elevation 1,091 m (3,579 ft), (1991–2020 normals, extremes 1981–2010)
Month	Jan	Feb	Mar	Apr	May	Jun	Jul	Aug	Sep	Oct	Nov	Dec	Year
Record high °C (°F)	17.7 (63.9)	22.8 (73.0)	27.7 (81.9)	34.1 (93.4)	34.7 (94.5)	36.5 (97.7)	36.9 (98.4)	34.6 (94.3)	34.6 (94.3)	28.9 (84.0)	25.2 (77.4)	17.5 (63.5)	36.9 (98.4)
Mean daily maximum °C (°F)	3.8 (38.8)	7.2 (45.0)	12.9 (55.2)	19.5 (67.1)	23.8 (74.8)	27.5 (81.5)	28.4 (83.1)	26.9 (80.4)	22.4 (72.3)	17.3 (63.1)	11.3 (52.3)	5.3 (41.5)	17.2 (62.9)
Daily mean °C (°F)	−4.6 (23.7)	−1.0 (30.2)	4.6 (40.3)	11.0 (51.8)	15.6 (60.1)	19.9 (67.8)	22.0 (71.6)	20.6 (69.1)	15.6 (60.1)	9.5 (49.1)	2.9 (37.2)	−3.1 (26.4)	9.4 (49.0)
Mean daily minimum °C (°F)	−10.2 (13.6)	−6.7 (19.9)	−1.5 (29.3)	4.0 (39.2)	8.4 (47.1)	13.1 (55.6)	16.7 (62.1)	15.9 (60.6)	10.9 (51.6)	4.3 (39.7)	−2.4 (27.7)	−8.5 (16.7)	3.7 (38.6)
Record low °C (°F)	−22.6 (−8.7)	−18.8 (−1.8)	−18.7 (−1.7)	−8.9 (16.0)	−4.4 (24.1)	3.0 (37.4)	7.9 (46.2)	7.1 (44.8)	−2.0 (28.4)	−11.2 (11.8)	−19.1 (−2.4)	−25.1 (−13.2)	−25.1 (−13.2)
Average precipitation mm (inches)	4.6 (0.18)	8.4 (0.33)	14.7 (0.58)	29.5 (1.16)	48.4 (1.91)	71.6 (2.82)	120.3 (4.74)	122.4 (4.82)	78.1 (3.07)	44.9 (1.77)	15.3 (0.60)	3.2 (0.13)	561.4 (22.11)
Average precipitation days (≥ 0.1 mm)	3.1	4.1	5.2	7.0	9.3	9.8	12.9	12.9	11.4	9.1	5.0	2.8	92.6
Average snowy days	4.9	5.4	3.6	0.7	0	0	0	0	0	0.5	3.1	4.2	22.4
Average relative humidity (%)	53	55	53	53	59	64	75	77	76	70	62	55	63
Mean monthly sunshine hours	193.8	179.6	211.3	230.4	244.8	239.0	229.9	208.3	173.1	187.4	182.4	194.0	2,474
Percentage possible sunshine	62	58	57	58	56	55	52	50	47	54	60	64	56
Source: China Meteorological Administration

== History ==
A human skull fossil dating 50,000 years old was uncovered in the county. Other major archaeological digs include a number of Yangshao relics, dating back to the Neolithic Age. A number of preserved historic sites dot the county, such as stone carvings and grottoes from the Tang and Song Dynasties, ancient tombs from the Qin, Han, Ming, and Qing Dynasties, as well as a number of sites relevant to the Chinese Civil War.

== Demographics ==
Population census
Year	Pop.	±% p.a.
1947	34,587	—
1977	55,700	+1.60%
1990	45,664	−1.52%
2000	49,990	+0.91%
2003	46,996	−2.04%
2012	49,500	+0.58%

Huanglong County's population demonstrated consistent growth from the 1940s through the 1970s, but has since been somewhat stable due to sizable migration towards more urban areas. The county is almost entirely Han Chinese in ethnicity, but is home to 11 minority groups. As of 2000, its second largest ethnic group is the Hui People, with 76 people; the county's third largest ethnic group is the Mongol People, with 67 people.

== Economy ==
Well-known products from Huanglong County include its walnuts, honey, and Chinese mitten crabs. The county has a walnut growing area 280,000 mu (19,000 hectares or 47,000 acres), yielding an annual output of 11,000 tons of walnuts. The county has an apple growing area of 144,000 mu (9,600 ha or 24,000 acres), producing 65,000 tons of apples annually. There are 88,000 beehives in the county, producing 1,300 tons of honey annually. The county also has 430 mu (29 ha or 72 acres) of crab farms.

== Transportation ==
The G22 Qingdao-Lanzhou Expressway passes through the county, as well as the Yulan expressway, and another highway to neighboring Hancheng City.
