= G6511 Ansai–Qingjian Expressway =

Road in Shaanxi, China

G6511 Ansai-Qingjian Expressway
- 安塞－清涧高速公路
- Ansai-Qingjian Expressway, An-Qing Expressway, Shaanxi Provincial Expressway S14

Route information
- Auxiliary route of G65
- Length: 30.1 km (18.7 mi)
- Existed: 11 December 2020–present

Major junctions
- From: Ansai District
- To: Qingjian County

Location
- Country: China

Highway system
- National Trunk Highway System; Primary; Auxiliary; National Highways; Transport in China
← G65	→ G6512

The G6511 Ansai-Qingjian Expressway (Chinese: G6511安塞清澗高速公路; pinyin: G liùwǔyīyī Ānsāi-Qīngjiàn gāosù gōnglù), also known as the Anqing Expressway (Chinese: 安清高速公路; pinyin: Ān Qīng gāosù gōnglù), or Shaanxi Provincial Expressway S14 (Chinese: 陝高速S14; pinyin: Shǎn gāosù S shí sì), is an under construction expressway in Shaanxi, China. A segment connecting Qingjian County, in Yulin to neighboring Zichang, in Yan'an, was opened in 2020. Once completed, the expressway will extend to Ansai District, in Yan'an.

== History ==
Construction began on the 30.1 kilometres (18.7 mi) section connecting Zichang and Qingjian County in August 2017. Construction was completed in late 2019. This section was opened to traffic on December 11, 2020.

The Shaanxi provincial government submitted a request for proposal for the remaining 59.97 kilometres (37.26 mi) section connecting the existing highway to Ansai District in October 2022. The bidding process closed in November 2022.

== Design ==
The completed section of the highway from Zichang to Qingjian County has four lanes, a speed limit of 80 kilometres per hour (50 mph), and a roadbed width of 25.25 metres (82.8 ft). The length of this section totals 30.1 kilometres (18.7 mi). The total construction cost of this section totaled 2.58 billion renminbi (RMB).

== Route ==
G6511 Ansai-Qingjian Expressway Route (east to west)
Location	County-level division	Status
Xihejiagou Village (Chinese: 西贺家沟村)	Qingjian County	Completed
Zhejiaping (Chinese: 折家坪镇)	Qingjian County	Completed
Majiabian (Chinese: 马家砭镇)	Zichang	Completed
Yangjiayuanze (Chinese: 杨家园则镇)	Zichang	Completed
Tuojiagou Village (Chinese: 拓家沟村)	Zichang	Completed
Wujiazhaizi Village (Chinese: 吴家寨子村)	Zichang	Completed
	Ansai District	Incomplete
