= Tongren No. 1 Middle School =

School in Tongren, Guizhou, China

- Simplified Chinese: 贵州省铜仁第一中学
- Traditional Chinese: 貴州省銅仁第一中學
Transcriptions
Standard Mandarin
- Hanyu Pinyin: Guìzhōushěng Tóngrén Dìyī Zhōngxué

Alternative Chinese name
- Simplified Chinese: 铜仁一中
- Traditional Chinese: 銅仁一中
Transcriptions
Standard Mandarin
- Hanyu Pinyin: Tóngrén Yīzhōng

Tongren No.1 Middle School of Guizhou (Chinese: 贵州省铜仁第一中学) is a secondary school in Chuandong Education Zone (川硐教育园区 Chuāndòng Jiàoyù Yuánqū), Bijiang District, Tongren, Guizhou.

It was established in 1938 as the Guizhou National Secondary School (国立贵州中学) and later renamed to No. 3 National Secondary School (国立第三中学). After the Second Sino-Japanese War/World War II ended, it became a provincial school, Guizhou Provincial Tongren Secondary School (贵州省立铜仁中学). After the conclusion of the Chinese Civil War in 1949, it became Guizhou Province Tongren Secondary School (贵州省铜仁中学). It adopted its current name in 1973.
