= Fourth series of the renminbi =

1987 banknote issue by the People's Bank of China

The fourth series of the renminbi was introduced between 1987 and 1997 by the People's Bank of China. The theme of this series was that under the governance of the Chinese Communist Party, the various peoples of China would be united in building a Chinese-style social democracy.

To present this theme, the ¥100 note features four people important to the founding of the People's Republic of China: Mao Zedong, Zhou Enlai, Liu Shaoqi, and Zhu De. The ¥50 note features an intellectual, a farmer, and an industrial worker, characteristic Chinese communist images. The other banknotes show portraits of people from 14 different ethnic groups found in China, especially ethnic minorities.

Banknotes were introduced in denominations of 0.1, 0.2, 0.5 (1, 2, 5 jiao), 1, 2, 5, 10, 50 and 100 yuan. Coins were introduced in denominations of 0.1, 0.5 and 1 yuan. The banknotes were dated 1980, 1990, or 1996 to indicate different editions. Unlike the second and the third series, they are still legal tender although only the smaller denominations (smaller than ¥1) remain in widespread circulation.

On March 22, 2018, the People's Bank of China announced the Fourth series of the renminbi (excluding ¥0.1 and ¥0.5 banknotes and ¥0.5 and ¥1 coins) would be recalled on April 30. After that date, notes of the Fourth series of the renminbi can be exchanged at any bank branch until April 30, 2019.

== Date of issue ==
- April 27, 1987: ¥50 (1980 edition) and ¥0.5.
- May 10, 1988: ¥100 (1980 edition), ¥2 (1980 edition), ¥1 (1980 edition) and ¥0.2 banknotes.
- September 22, 1988: ¥10, ¥5 and ¥0.1 banknotes.
- June 1, 1992: ¥1, ¥0.5 and ¥0.1 coins.
- August 20, 1992: ¥50 (1990 edition) and ¥100 (1990 edition) banknotes.
- March 1, 1995: ¥1 (1990 edition) banknote.
- April 10, 1996: ¥2 (1990 edition) banknote.
- April 1, 1997: ¥1 (1996 edition) banknote.

== Coins ==
Minted from 1991 to 1999 except that ¥0.5 was last minted in 2001. Coins carry the Emblem of the People's Republic of China, the full title of the state in Chinese and pinyin on the obverse side, and the denomination and an image of a flower on the reverse side.

Obverse	Reverse	Value	Technical parameters		Description			Date of		
Obverse	Reverse	Value	Diameter	Composition	Edge	Obverse	Reverse	year	issue	withdrawal
		¥0.1	22.5 mm	Aluminium	Plain	Chrysanthemum; value	Emblem of the People's Republic of China and year of minting	1991–1999	June 1, 1992	April 30, 2018
		¥0.5	20.5 mm	Brass	Segmented (Plain and Reeded edges)	Plum blossom (Prunus mune); value	Emblem of the People's Republic of China and year of minting	1991–2001	June 1, 1992	Current
		¥1	25 mm	Nickel-plated steel	Plain	Peony blossom (Paeonia); value	Emblem of the People's Republic of China and year of minting	1991–1999	June 1, 1992	Current
For table standards, see the coin specification table.

== Banknotes ==
Image	Value	Obverse	Reverse	Year	Date of issue	Date of withdrawal	Completely recalled
	¥0.1	Miao and Manchu men	Emblem of the People's Republic of China	1980	September 22, 1988	Current	
	¥0.2	Buyei and Korean women	Emblem of the People's Republic of China	1980	May 10, 1988	April 30, 2018	April 30, 2019
	¥0.5	Miao and Zhuang women	Emblem of the People's Republic of China	1980	April 27, 1987	Current	
	¥1	Dong and Yao women	Great Wall of China	1980	May 10, 1988	April 30, 2018	April 30, 2019
	¥1	Dong and Yao women	Great Wall of China	1990	March 1, 1995	April 30, 2018	April 30, 2019
	¥1	Dong and Yao women	Great Wall of China	1996	April 1, 1997	April 30, 2018	April 30, 2019
	¥2	Uyghur and Yi (Nuosu) women	Southern Heaven Rock	1980	May 10, 1988	April 30, 2018	April 30, 2019
	¥2	Uyghur and Yi (Nuosu) women	Southern Heaven Rock	1990	April 10, 1996	April 30, 2018	April 30, 2019
	¥5	Tibetan woman and Hui elder	Wu Gorge on the Yangtze river	1980	September 22, 1988	April 30, 2018	April 30, 2019
	¥10	Han and Mongol men	Mount Everest	1980	September 22, 1988	April 30, 2018	April 30, 2019
	¥50	An intellectual, a farmer, and an industrial worker	Hukou Waterfall along the Yellow River	1980	April 27, 1987	April 30, 2018	April 30, 2019
	¥50	An intellectual, a farmer, and an industrial worker	Hukou Waterfall along the Yellow River	1990	August 20, 1992	April 30, 2018	April 30, 2019
	¥100	Mao Zedong, Zhou Enlai, Liu Shaoqi, and Zhu De.	Jinggang Mountains	1980	May 10, 1988	April 30, 2018	April 30, 2019
	¥100	Mao Zedong, Zhou Enlai, Liu Shaoqi, and Zhu De.	Jinggang Mountains	1990	August 20, 1992	April 30, 2018	April 30, 2019
