= G6025 Dongkou–Sansui Expressway =

Road in China

Dongkou–Sansui Expressway
- 洞口－三穗高速公路
- Dongsan Expressway 洞三高速公路

Route information
- Auxiliary route of G60

Major junctions
- West end: G60 / Guizhou S84 in Sansui County, Qiandongnan Miao and Dong Autonomous Prefecture, Guizhou
- East end: G60 in Dongkou County, Shaoyang, Hunan

Location
- Country: China

Highway system
- National Trunk Highway System; Primary; Auxiliary; National Highways; Transport in China
← G6023	→ G65

The G6025 Dongkou–Sansui Expressway (Chinese: 洞口—三穗高速公路), also referred to as the Dongsan Expressway (Chinese: 洞三高速公路), is an under construction expressway in China that will connect Dongkou, Hunan to Sansui, Guizhou via Huitong and Tianzhu.
