= Daxing Subdistrict, Songtao County =

Daxing Subdistrict 大兴街道
- Subdistrict
- Location in China
- Coordinates: 27°52′44″N 109°17′30″E
- Country: People's Republic of China
- Province: Guizhou
- Prefecture-level city: Tongren
- Autonomous county: Songtao Miao Autonomous County
- Time zone: UTC+8 (China Standard)

Daxing Subdistrict (simplified Chinese: 大兴街道; traditional Chinese: 大興街道; pinyin: Dàxīng Jiēdào) is a subdistrict in Songtao Miao Autonomous County, Guizhou, China. As of 2018, it has 3 residential communities and 7 villages under its administration.

== See also ==
- List of township-level divisions of Guizhou
