= G6022 Liling–Loudi Expressway =

Road in China

Liling–Loudi Expressway
- 醴陵－娄底高速公路
- Lilou Expressway 醴娄高速公路

Route information
- Auxiliary route of G60
- Length: 154.27 km (95.86 mi)

Major junctions
- West end: G60 / Hunan S70 / Hunan S71 in Louxing District, Loudi, Hunan
- East end: G60 in Liling, Zhuzhou, Hunan

Location
- Country: China

Highway system
- National Trunk Highway System; Primary; Auxiliary; National Highways; Transport in China
← G6021	→ G6023

The G6022 Liling–Loudi Expressway (Chinese: 醴陵—娄底高速公路), also referred to as the Lilou Expressway (Chinese: 醴娄高速公路), is an expressway in Hunan, China that connects Liling to Loudi.

== History ==
Construction started on 31 August 2020 and is expected to open to traffic in 2025.
