= Guantao County =

Guantao County 馆陶县 Kwantao
- County
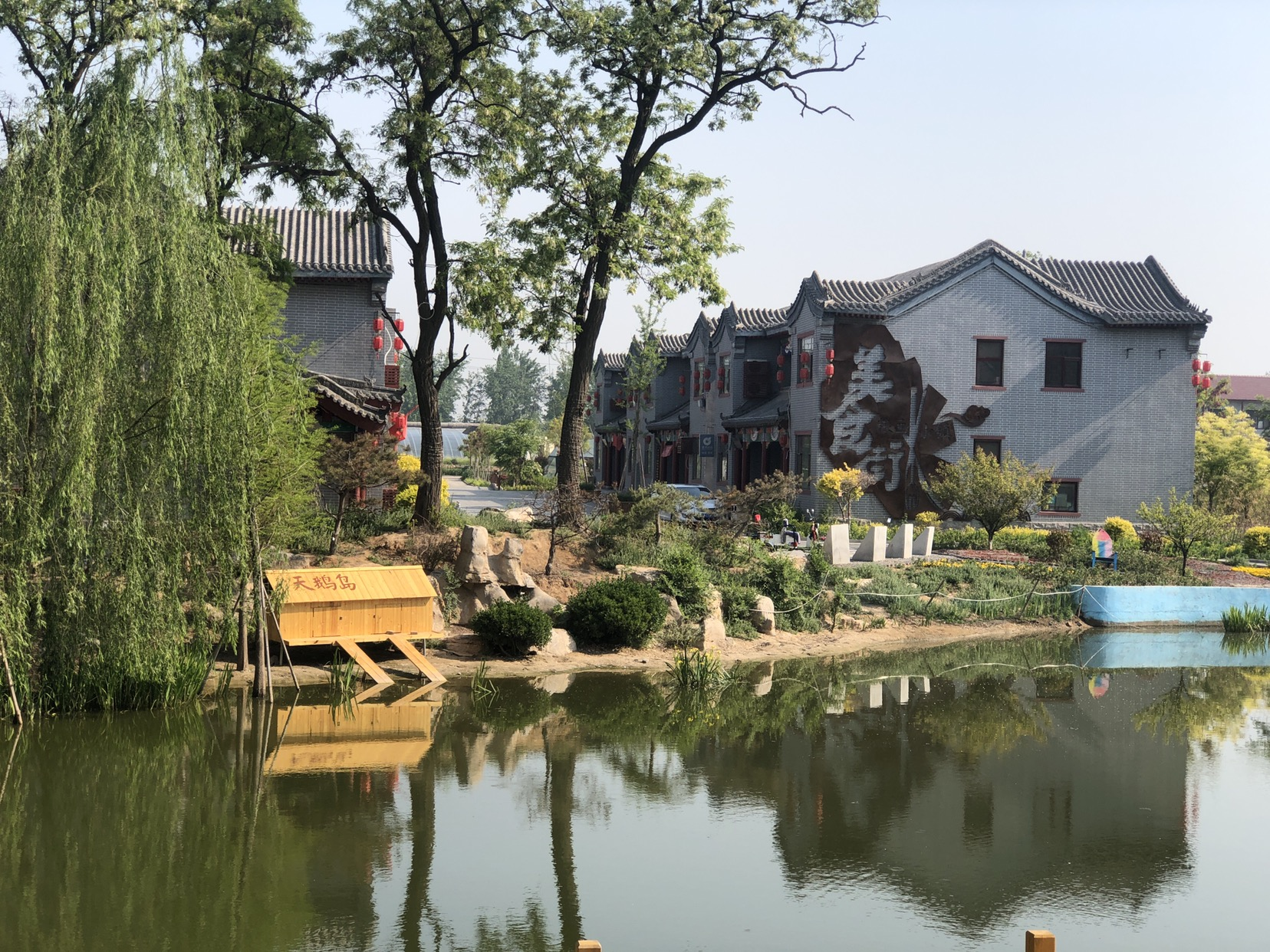

- Location in Hebei
- Coordinates: 36°32′N 115°18′E
- Country: People's Republic of China
- Province: Hebei
- Prefecture-level city: Handan
- County seat: Guantao Town (馆陶镇)

Area
  - Total: 456 km^{2} (176 sq mi)
- Elevation: 44 m (144 ft)

Population
  - Total: 320,000
  - Density: 700/km^{2} (1,800/sq mi)
- Time zone: UTC+8 (China Standard)
- Postal code: 057750

Guantao County (simplified Chinese: 馆陶县; traditional Chinese: 館陶縣; pinyin: Guǎntáo Xiàn) is a county of southern Hebei province, China, bordering Shandong's Guan County and Linqing to the east across the Wei Canal (卫运河). It is under the administration of Handan City, and has a population of 320,000 residing in an area of 456 km^{2} (176 sq mi). Jinan lies 160 kilometres (99 mi) to the east, Handan 75 km (47 mi) to the west, and Beijing 420 km (260 mi) to the north, and the county is served by G22 Qingdao–Lanzhou Expressway and China National Highways 106 and 309. The area was formerly part of Shandong Province.

== Administrative divisions ==
There are 4 towns and 4 townships under the county's administration.

Towns:

- Guantao (馆陶镇), Weisengzhai (魏僧寨镇), Fangzhai (房寨镇), Zibao (柴堡镇)

Townships:

- Nanxucun Township (南徐村乡), Luqiao Township (路桥乡), Wangqiao Township (王桥乡), Shoushansi Township (寿山寺乡)

== Climate ==
Climate data for Guantao, elevation 41 m (135 ft), (1991–2020 normals, extremes 1981–present)
Month	Jan	Feb	Mar	Apr	May	Jun	Jul	Aug	Sep	Oct	Nov	Dec	Year
Record high °C (°F)	18.5 (65.3)	24.3 (75.7)	28.7 (83.7)	34.6 (94.3)	39.4 (102.9)	41.9 (107.4)	41.0 (105.8)	36.3 (97.3)	38.0 (100.4)	34.2 (93.6)	28.3 (82.9)	22.3 (72.1)	41.9 (107.4)
Mean daily maximum °C (°F)	3.9 (39.0)	8.3 (46.9)	14.9 (58.8)	21.5 (70.7)	27.1 (80.8)	32.0 (89.6)	32.1 (89.8)	30.4 (86.7)	27.1 (80.8)	21.3 (70.3)	12.6 (54.7)	5.6 (42.1)	19.7 (67.5)
Daily mean °C (°F)	−1.7 (28.9)	2.2 (36.0)	8.6 (47.5)	15.2 (59.4)	21.0 (69.8)	25.9 (78.6)	27.2 (81.0)	25.5 (77.9)	21.0 (69.8)	14.8 (58.6)	6.6 (43.9)	0.1 (32.2)	13.9 (57.0)
Mean daily minimum °C (°F)	−6.2 (20.8)	−2.6 (27.3)	3.2 (37.8)	9.5 (49.1)	15.2 (59.4)	20.4 (68.7)	23.1 (73.6)	21.7 (71.1)	16.3 (61.3)	9.7 (49.5)	1.9 (35.4)	−4.1 (24.6)	9.0 (48.2)
Record low °C (°F)	−19.3 (−2.7)	−15.5 (4.1)	−9.3 (15.3)	−2.3 (27.9)	4.3 (39.7)	9.7 (49.5)	16.7 (62.1)	13.0 (55.4)	4.5 (40.1)	−2.2 (28.0)	−17.1 (1.2)	−18.8 (−1.8)	−19.3 (−2.7)
Average precipitation mm (inches)	3.1 (0.12)	8.2 (0.32)	9.0 (0.35)	28.8 (1.13)	43.7 (1.72)	66.9 (2.63)	151.2 (5.95)	116.4 (4.58)	47.3 (1.86)	31.0 (1.22)	18.1 (0.71)	4.5 (0.18)	528.2 (20.77)
Average precipitation days (≥ 0.1 mm)	1.8	3.2	2.7	4.7	6.1	8.1	10.9	9.1	6.3	5.0	3.9	2.4	64.2
Average snowy days	2.5	2.7	0.8	0.2	0	0	0	0	0	0	0.9	2.1	9.2
Average relative humidity (%)	63	58	54	61	64	62	78	83	76	69	69	66	67
Mean monthly sunshine hours	144.0	149.4	205.7	224.5	249.5	227.1	194.6	196.8	183.4	178.8	150.9	141.7	2,246.4
Percentage possible sunshine	47	48	55	57	57	52	44	47	50	52	50	47	51
Source: China Meteorological Administration all-time January high
