= Songtao Miao Autonomous County =

Songtao County 松桃县 Sungtao, Sung-t'ao
- Autonomous county
- 松桃苗族自治县; Songtao Miao Autonomous County
- Location of the seat in Guizhou Songtao (Southwest China)
- Coordinates (Songtao County government): 28°09′14″N 109°12′11″E
- Country: China
- Province: Guizhou
- Prefecture-level city: Tongren
- County seat: Liaogao Subdistrict

Area
  - Total: 3,400 km^{2} (1,300 sq mi)
- Elevation: 411 m (1,348 ft)

Population (2020 census)
  - Total: 487,737
  - Density: 140/km^{2} (370/sq mi)
- Time zone: UTC+8 (China Standard)
- Postal code: 558200
- Area code: 0856
- Website: www.songtao.gov.cn

Songtao Miao Autonomous County (simplified Chinese: 松桃苗族自治县; traditional Chinese: 松桃苗族自治縣; pinyin: Sōngtáo Miáozú Zìzhìxiàn) is an autonomous county in the northeast of Guizhou province, China, bordering Chongqing to the north and Hunan province to the east. It is under the administration of the prefecture-level city of Tongren.

== Administrative divisions ==
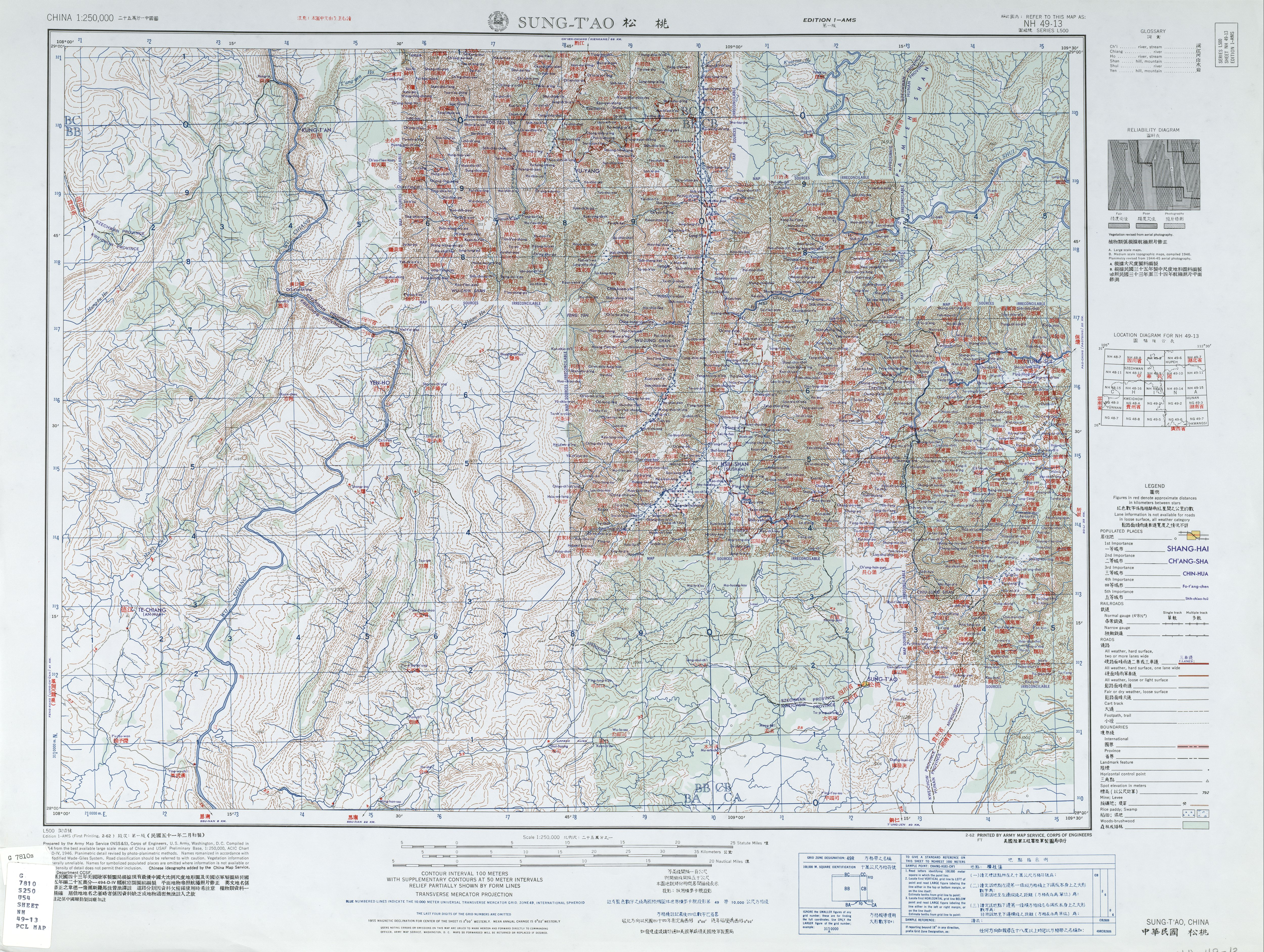
Map including Songtao (labeled as SUNG-T'AO 松桃) (AMS, 1954)

Songtao is divided into 5 subdistricts, 17 towns and 6 townships:

- Daxing Subdistrict (大兴街道)
- Liaogao Subdistrict (蓼皋街道)
- Shichang Subdistrict (世昌街道)
- Taipingying Subdistrict (太平营街道)
- Jiujiang Subdistrict (九江街道)
- Panshi Town (盘石镇)
- Panxin Town (盘信镇)
- Dapingchang Town (大坪场镇)
- Pujue Town (普觉镇)
- Zhaiying Town (寨英镇)
- Mengxi Town (孟溪镇)
- Wuluo Town (乌罗镇)
- Ganlong Town (甘龙镇)
- Changxingbao Town (长兴堡镇)
- Yajia Town (迓驾镇)
- Niulang Town (牛郎镇)
- Dalu Town (大路镇)
- Mushu Town (木树镇)
- Lengshuixi Town (冷水溪镇)
- Huangban Town (黄板镇)
- Zhengda Town (正大镇)
- Pingtou Town (平头镇)
- Changping Township (长坪乡)
- Miao'ai Township (妙隘乡)
- Shiliang Township (石梁乡)
- Waxi Township (瓦溪乡)
- Yong'an Township (永安乡)
- Shabahe Township (沙坝河乡)

== Climate ==
Climate data for Songtao, elevation 406 m (1,332 ft), (1991–2020 normals, extremes 1981–present)
Month	Jan	Feb	Mar	Apr	May	Jun	Jul	Aug	Sep	Oct	Nov	Dec	Year
Record high °C (°F)	24.6 (76.3)	30.4 (86.7)	34.2 (93.6)	34.8 (94.6)	35.9 (96.6)	36.8 (98.2)	39.6 (103.3)	39.3 (102.7)	38.2 (100.8)	34.8 (94.6)	30.1 (86.2)	23.6 (74.5)	39.6 (103.3)
Mean daily maximum °C (°F)	8.7 (47.7)	11.4 (52.5)	16.0 (60.8)	22.1 (71.8)	26.1 (79.0)	28.9 (84.0)	32.1 (89.8)	32.2 (90.0)	28.0 (82.4)	21.9 (71.4)	17.0 (62.6)	11.3 (52.3)	21.3 (70.4)
Daily mean °C (°F)	5.0 (41.0)	7.3 (45.1)	11.2 (52.2)	16.8 (62.2)	20.9 (69.6)	24.2 (75.6)	27.0 (80.6)	26.5 (79.7)	22.6 (72.7)	17.2 (63.0)	12.2 (54.0)	7.1 (44.8)	16.5 (61.7)
Mean daily minimum °C (°F)	2.6 (36.7)	4.5 (40.1)	8.0 (46.4)	13.1 (55.6)	17.2 (63.0)	20.9 (69.6)	23.1 (73.6)	22.6 (72.7)	19.0 (66.2)	14.2 (57.6)	9.2 (48.6)	4.3 (39.7)	13.2 (55.8)
Record low °C (°F)	−5.5 (22.1)	−5.3 (22.5)	−2.6 (27.3)	2.3 (36.1)	8.0 (46.4)	12.6 (54.7)	16.3 (61.3)	15.5 (59.9)	11.3 (52.3)	4.2 (39.6)	−1.9 (28.6)	−5.1 (22.8)	−5.5 (22.1)
Average precipitation mm (inches)	39.8 (1.57)	42.6 (1.68)	71.8 (2.83)	120.8 (4.76)	195.7 (7.70)	218.8 (8.61)	211.9 (8.34)	139.1 (5.48)	100.4 (3.95)	101.7 (4.00)	59.9 (2.36)	30.4 (1.20)	1,332.9 (52.48)
Average precipitation days (≥ 0.1 mm)	12.6	13.1	15.8	17.3	17.9	17.1	13.6	12.0	11.2	14.4	11.6	10.9	167.5
Average snowy days	3.9	2.1	0.7	0	0	0	0	0	0	0	0.1	1.5	8.3
Average relative humidity (%)	79	79	79	79	81	83	79	79	79	82	81	78	80
Mean monthly sunshine hours	33.7	37.3	57.2	74.0	92.2	85.5	150.7	153.4	104.9	74.1	64.9	51.3	979.2
Percentage possible sunshine	10	12	15	19	22	21	36	38	29	21	20	16	22
Source: China Meteorological Administration
