= Yijun County =

Yijun County 宜君县 Ichun
- County
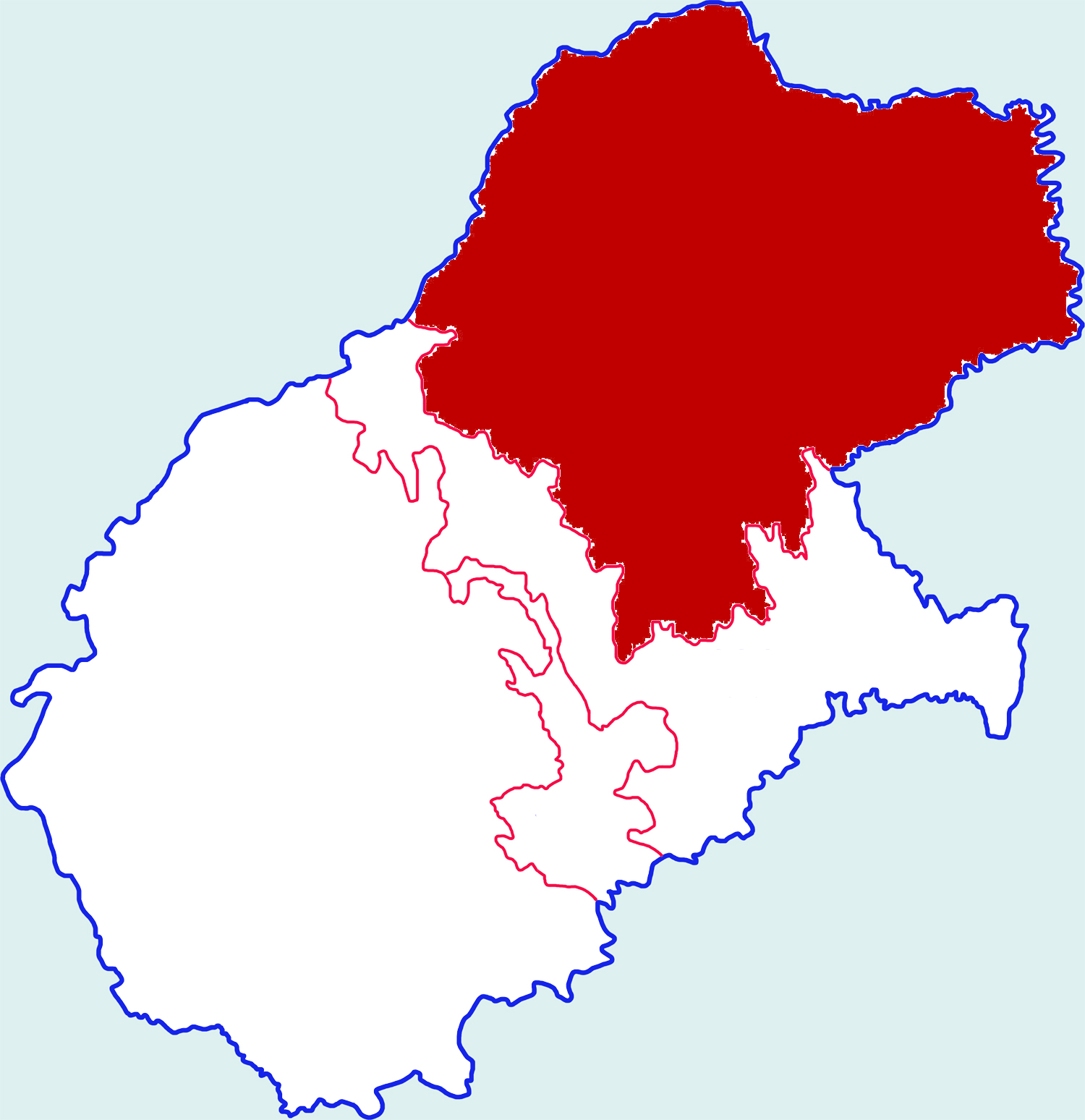
- Yijun in Tongchuan

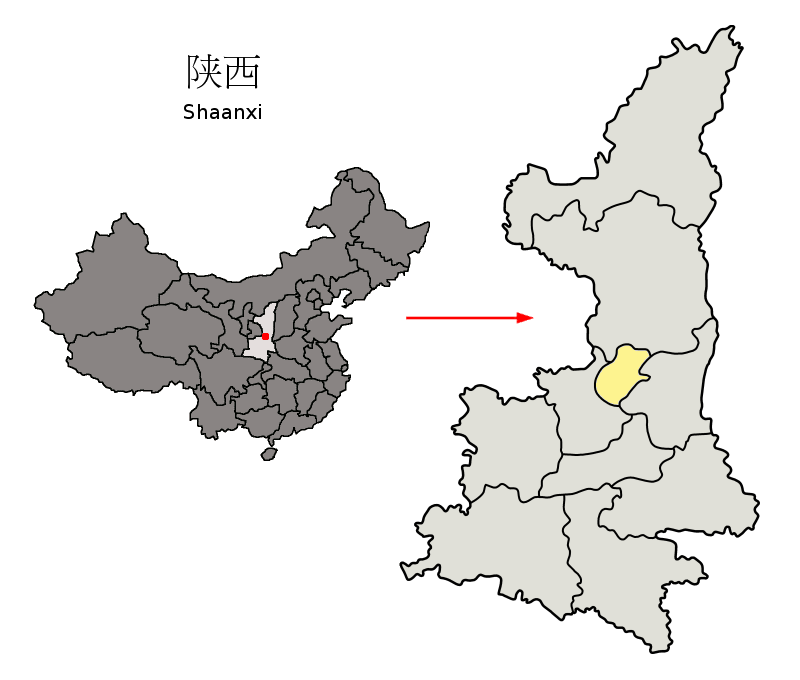
- Tongchuan in Shaanxi
- Coordinates: 35°23′55″N 109°07′01″E
- Country: People's Republic of China
- Province: Shaanxi
- Prefecture-level city: Tongchuan

Area
  - Total: 1,531 km^{2} (591 sq mi)

Population (2012)
  - Total: 92,100
  - Density: 60.2/km^{2} (156/sq mi)
- Time zone: UTC+8 (China standard time)
- Postal code: 727200
- Licence plates: 陕B

Yijun County (Chinese: 宜君县; pinyin: Yíjūn Xiàn) is a county in the central part of Shaanxi province, China. It is the northernmost county-level division of the prefecture-level city of Tongchuan, and is located to the north of Guanzhong and at the southern edge of the Loess Plateau.

== Administrative divisions ==
As of 2020, Yijun County is divided to 1 subdistrict, 6 towns and 1 township.

Subdistricts

- Yiyang Subdistrict (宜阳街道)

Towns

- Peng (彭镇)
- Wuli (五里镇)
- Tai'an (太安镇)
- Qipan (棋盘镇)
- Yaosheng (尧生镇)
- Kuquan (哭泉镇)

Townships

- Yunmeng Township (云梦乡)

== Climate ==
Climate data for Yijun, elevation 1,395 m (4,577 ft), (1991–2020 normals, extremes 1981–2010)
Month	Jan	Feb	Mar	Apr	May	Jun	Jul	Aug	Sep	Oct	Nov	Dec	Year
Record high °C (°F)	16.4 (61.5)	21.0 (69.8)	26.0 (78.8)	33.2 (91.8)	32.0 (89.6)	34.6 (94.3)	32.8 (91.0)	32.2 (90.0)	32.8 (91.0)	25.7 (78.3)	22.6 (72.7)	17.0 (62.6)	34.6 (94.3)
Mean daily maximum °C (°F)	1.1 (34.0)	4.7 (40.5)	10.5 (50.9)	17.2 (63.0)	21.3 (70.3)	24.9 (76.8)	25.8 (78.4)	24.2 (75.6)	19.7 (67.5)	14.7 (58.5)	8.9 (48.0)	2.8 (37.0)	14.7 (58.4)
Daily mean °C (°F)	−3.3 (26.1)	0.0 (32.0)	5.3 (41.5)	11.7 (53.1)	16.2 (61.2)	20.1 (68.2)	21.5 (70.7)	20.0 (68.0)	15.6 (60.1)	10.3 (50.5)	4.4 (39.9)	−1.4 (29.5)	10.0 (50.1)
Mean daily minimum °C (°F)	−6.4 (20.5)	−3.4 (25.9)	1.7 (35.1)	7.6 (45.7)	12.2 (54.0)	16.2 (61.2)	18.1 (64.6)	16.8 (62.2)	12.6 (54.7)	7.2 (45.0)	1.3 (34.3)	−4.5 (23.9)	6.6 (43.9)
Record low °C (°F)	−19.7 (−3.5)	−15.7 (3.7)	−12.1 (10.2)	−6.1 (21.0)	0.7 (33.3)	6.9 (44.4)	11.0 (51.8)	8.5 (47.3)	1.9 (35.4)	−6.7 (19.9)	−16.1 (3.0)	−19.5 (−3.1)	−19.7 (−3.5)
Average precipitation mm (inches)	9.1 (0.36)	12.3 (0.48)	23.0 (0.91)	41.0 (1.61)	57.3 (2.26)	86.8 (3.42)	138.2 (5.44)	123.8 (4.87)	105.8 (4.17)	55.9 (2.20)	20.6 (0.81)	5.1 (0.20)	678.9 (26.73)
Average precipitation days (≥ 0.1 mm)	4.3	4.8	6.2	7.4	9.3	10.0	13.1	12.5	11.7	9.8	5.7	3.6	98.4
Average snowy days	5.7	6.4	5.0	1.1	0	0	0	0	0	0.7	3.5	4.5	26.9
Average relative humidity (%)	49	51	50	49	54	60	73	77	74	65	54	48	59
Mean monthly sunshine hours	198.3	180.5	209.3	230.7	245.9	232.8	219.0	197.4	161.4	172.8	184.8	198.9	2,431.8
Percentage possible sunshine	63	58	56	58	56	54	50	48	44	50	60	66	55
Source: China Meteorological Administration

== Transportation ==
- China National Highway 210
- Xi'an–Yan'an Railway
