= Hukou Waterfalls =

Waterfall on the Yellow River in China

Coordinates: 36°07′53″N 110°27′03″E

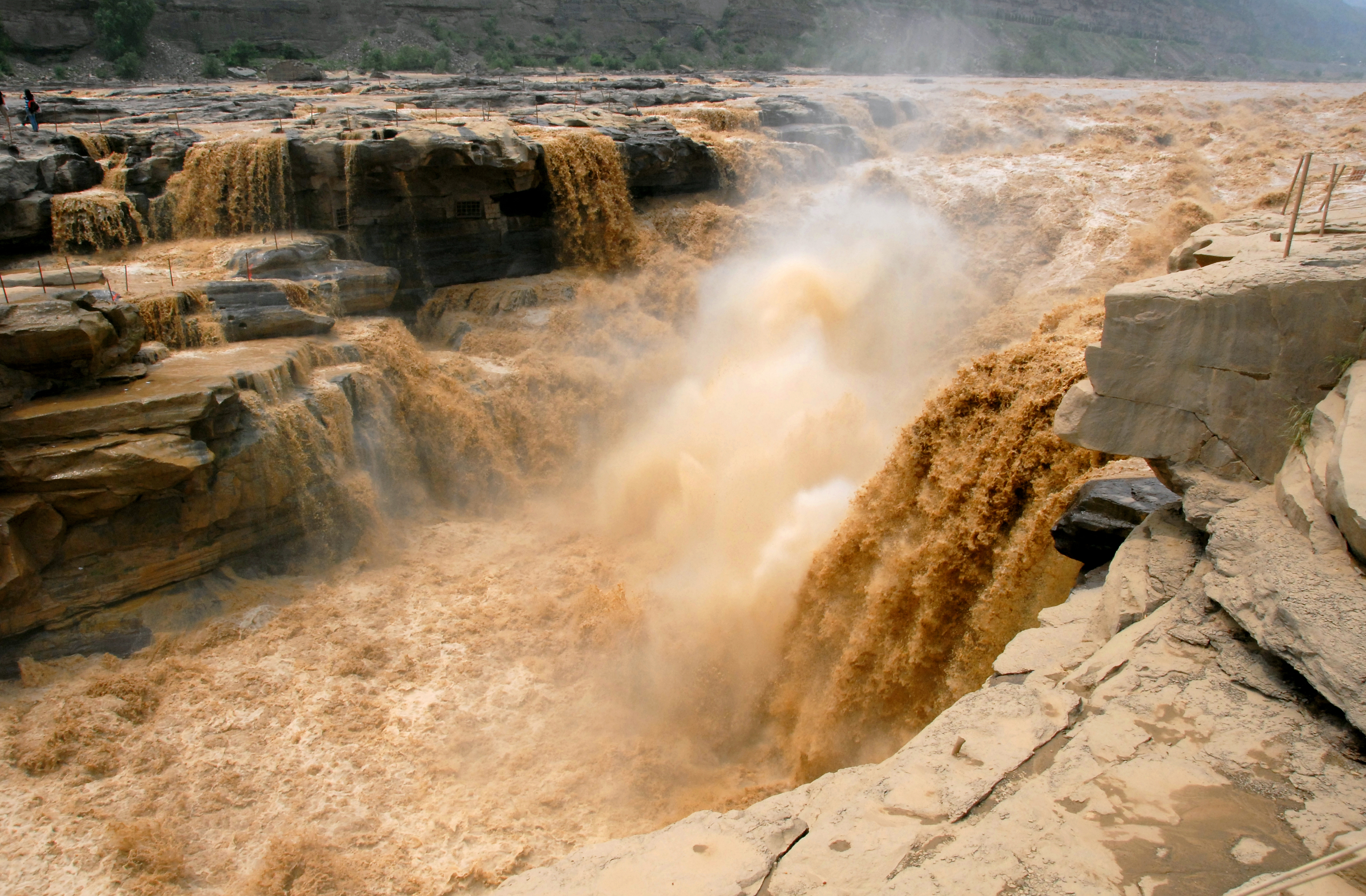
The Hukou Waterfalls in 2008

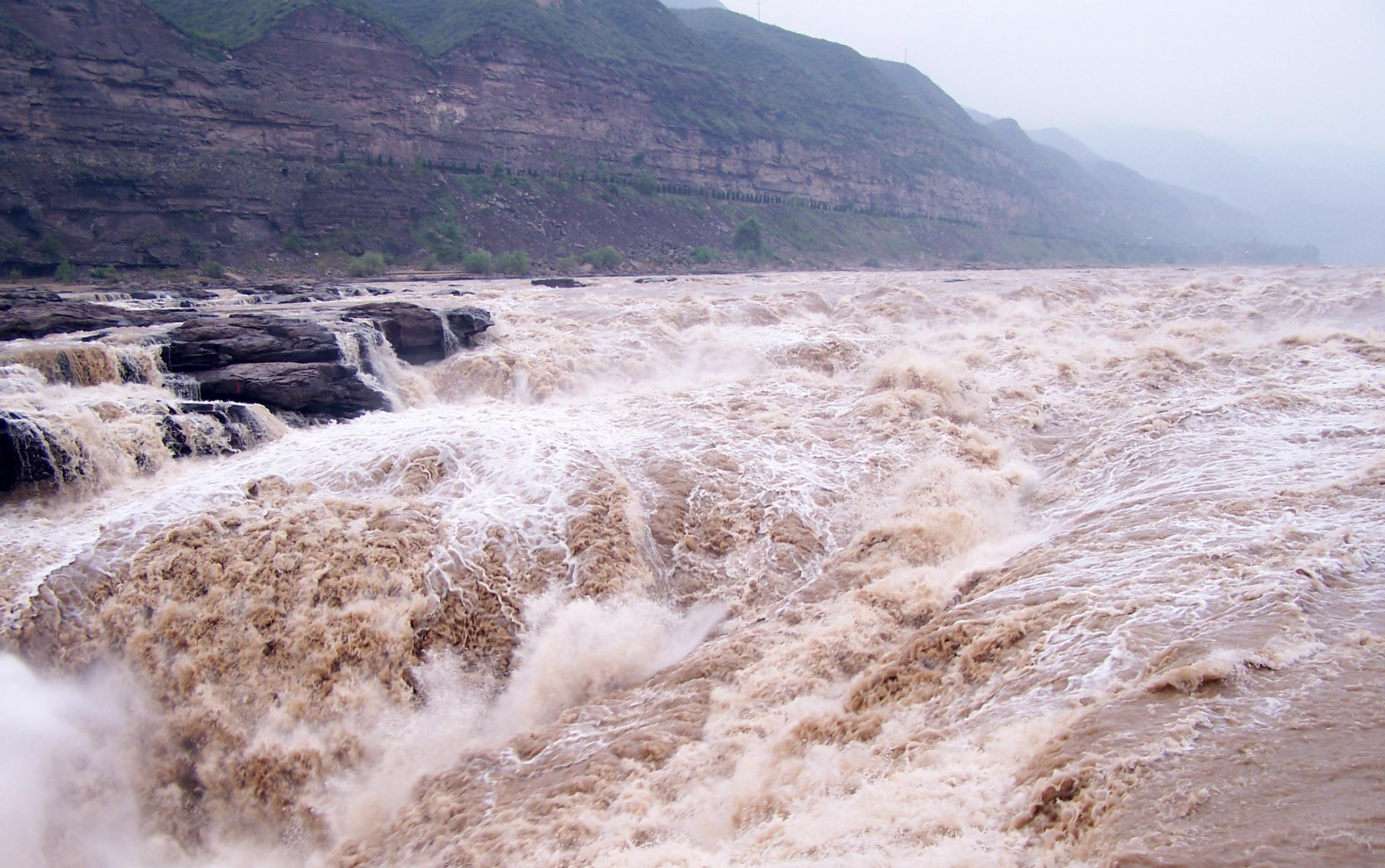
The Hukou Waterfalls in 2005

The Hukou Waterfalls (simplified Chinese: 壶口瀑布; traditional Chinese: 壺口瀑布; pinyin: Húkǒu Pùbù) is the largest waterfall on the Yellow River, the second largest waterfall in China (after the Huangguoshu Waterfall in Guizhou), and the world's largest yellow waterfall. It is located at the intersection of the provinces of Shanxi and Shaanxi, 165 km (103 mi) to the west of Fenxi County, and 50 km (31 mi) to the east of Yichuan County where the middle reaches of the Yellow River flow through Jinxia Grand Canyon. The width of the waterfall changes with the season, usually 30 metres (98 ft) wide but increasing to 50 m (164 ft) during flood season. It has a height of over 20 m (66 ft). When the Yellow River approaches the Hukou Mountain, blocked by mountains on both sides, its width is abruptly narrowed down to 20–30 m (66–98 ft). The water's velocity increases, and then plunges over a narrow opening on a cliff, forming a waterfall 15 m (49 ft) high and 20 m (66 ft) wide, as if water were pouring down from a huge teapot. Hence it gets the nickname Hukou (literally, "flask mouth") Waterfall.

Just below the waterfall, there is a shining stone called guǐshí (鬼石). What makes the stone mysterious is that it moves up and down according to the water level. No matter how large the water volume, it is still at least partly visible.

In the middle of the river, about 3,000 m (9,843 ft) from the Hukou Waterfalls, an enormous rock catches the attention of visitors. When the Yellow River flows to this point, divides into two, rolling and roaring on and on from both sides of the rock before reconverging.

Beneath the waterfall is the Qilangwo Bridge which connects the two provinces of Shanxi and Shaanxi. In the sunshine, the mist is refracted by sunlight to create a rainbow spanning the water like a colorful bridge. In 1991, Hukou Waterfalls was named one of the "40 Best" national scenic spots.

Due to its awkward location in the Loess Plateau hinterlands, Hukou was once very difficult to access. After the local government improved transport and tourist facilities, the number of tourists rose from 20,000 in 1994 to 47,000 in 1995. The figure for 1996 reached 100,000 tourists. Today, it is one of the top 100 tourist sites in China with well developed tourist infrastructure. At peak season, there are more than 40,000 tourists daily

An image of the Hukou Waterfalls can be seen on the older fourth series of the renminbi 50 RMB banknote.

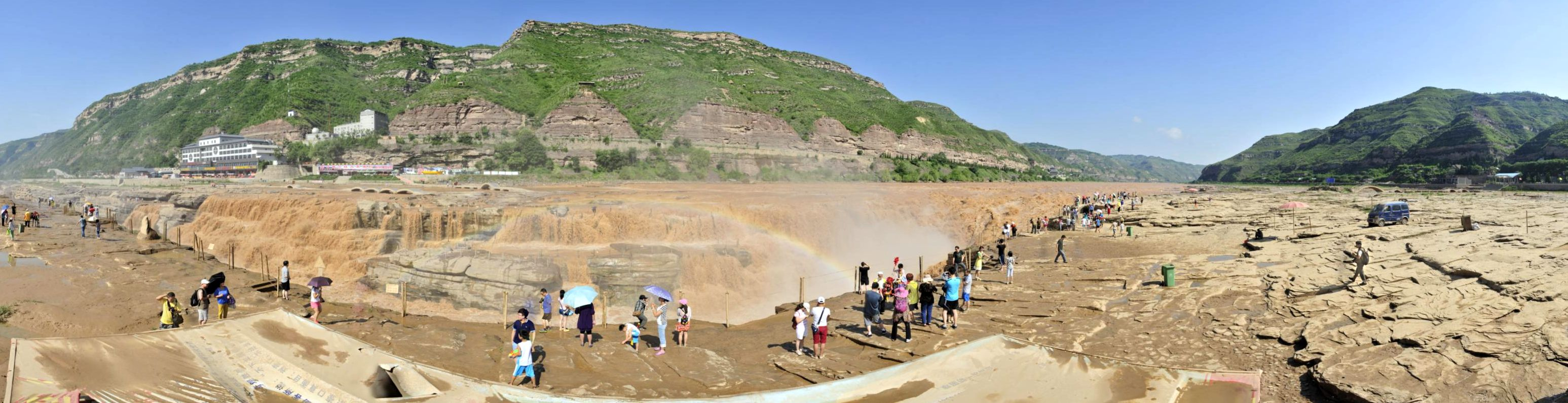
Hukou Waterfalls panorama, July 2014

== See also ==
- List of waterfalls
