= Tongren Polytechnic College =

Coordinates: 27.7356°N 109.2000°E

Tongren Polytechnic College (TRPTC; Chinese: 铜仁职业技术学院) is a tertiary-level institution in Chuandong Education Park (川硐教育园区), Bijiang, Tongren, Guizhou, China.

It formed in June 2002 as a merger of multiple tertiary institutions in Tongren; the Advanced Vocational and Technical School, the Agricultural School, the Commercial School, the Financial School, and the Medical School. The school has a 116-hectare (290-acre) campus.
