= Tongren =

Tongren 铜仁市 Tungjen
- Prefecture-level city
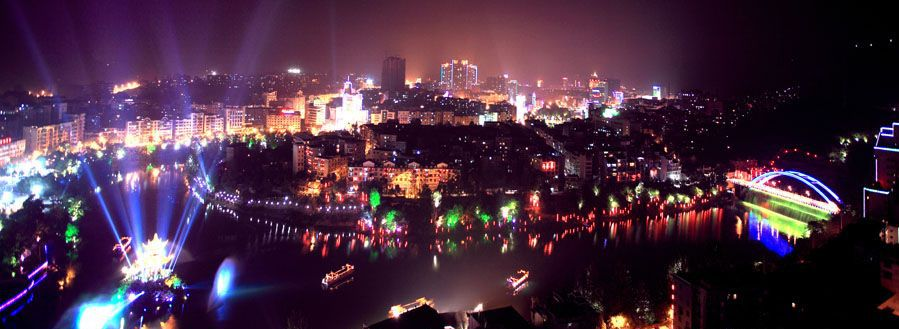

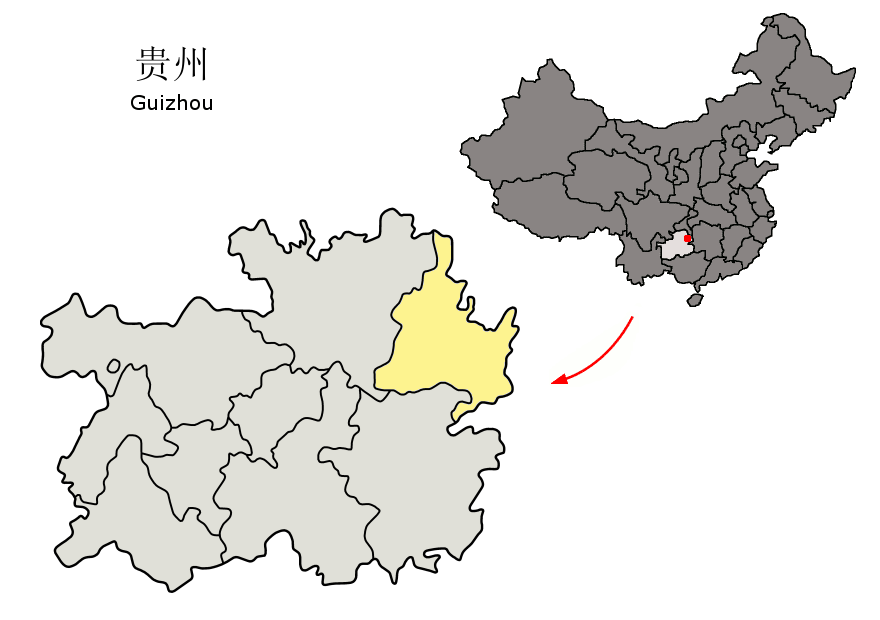
- Location of Tongren City jurisdiction in Guizhou
- Coordinates (Tongren municipal government): 27°43′54″N 109°11′22″E
- Country: People's Republic of China
- Province: Guizhou
- Municipal seat: Bijiang District

Area
  - Total: 18,014 km^{2} (6,955 sq mi)

Population (2020)
  - Total: 3,298,468

GDP
  - Total: CN¥ 132.8 billion US$ 19.3 billion
  - Per capita: CN¥ 40,269; US$ 5,838
- Time zone: UTC+8 (China Standard)
- Area code: 856
- ISO 3166 code: CN-GZ-06
- Website: www.tongren.gov.cn

Tongren (simplified Chinese: 铜仁; traditional Chinese: 銅仁; pinyin: Tóngrén) is a prefecture-level city in eastern Guizhou province, People's Republic of China, located within a tobacco planting and crop agricultural area. Tongren was known as Tongren Prefecture (铜仁地区) until November 2011, when it was converted into a prefecture-level city. By the end of 2024 and the beginning of 2025, Tongren City had a permanent population of 3.1615 million and a registered population of 4.494 million.

Tongren City borders Hunan to the east and Chongqing to the north, and is known as the "Gateway to Eastern Guizhou". The city covers an area of 18,000 square kilometers, and has jurisdiction over 2 districts, 8 counties, 8 provincial economic development zones, 2 provincial high-tech industrial development zones, and 1 provincial health and medicine industry demonstration zone.

Tongren is the location of Fanjingshan (Mount Fanjing), a mountain of significance in Buddhism and the highest peak of the Wuling Mountains, which was designated a UNESCO World Heritage Site in 2018. The surrounding national nature reserve is the only natural habitat of the endangered Guizhou snub-nosed monkey. Additionally, the city's Wanshan District was historically known as the "Cinnabar Capital of China" due to its mercury and cinnabar mining.

== History ==
In the Qin dynasty, the area belonged to Qianzhong County, and in the Han dynasty, it was changed to Wuling County. A formal county seat was established during the Shu Han period. During the Yongle period (1403–1424) of the Ming dynasty (1368–1644), two local governments known as "Sizhou Xuanweisi" (思州宣慰司) and "Sinan Xuanweisi" (思南宣慰司) resisted full subjugation. The Yongle Emperor sent troops to pacify the rebellion and set up a provincial administrative region known as "Guizhou Buzhengshisi" (贵州布政使司). Since then, their administrators were appointed by the central government.

== Administrative divisions ==
Tongren comprises 2 districts, 4 counties, and 4 autonomous counties.

- Districts:
  - Bijiang District (碧江区)
  - Wanshan District (万山区)
- Counties:
  - Dejiang County (德江县)
  - Jiangkou County (江口县)
  - Sinan County (思南县)
  - Shiqian County (石阡县)
- Autonomous counties:
  - Yuping Dong Autonomous County (玉屏侗族自治县)
  - Songtao Miao Autonomous County (松桃苗族自治县)
  - Yinjiang Tujia and Miao Autonomous County (印江土家族苗族自治县)
  - Yanhe Tujia Autonomous County (沿河土家族自治县)

Map
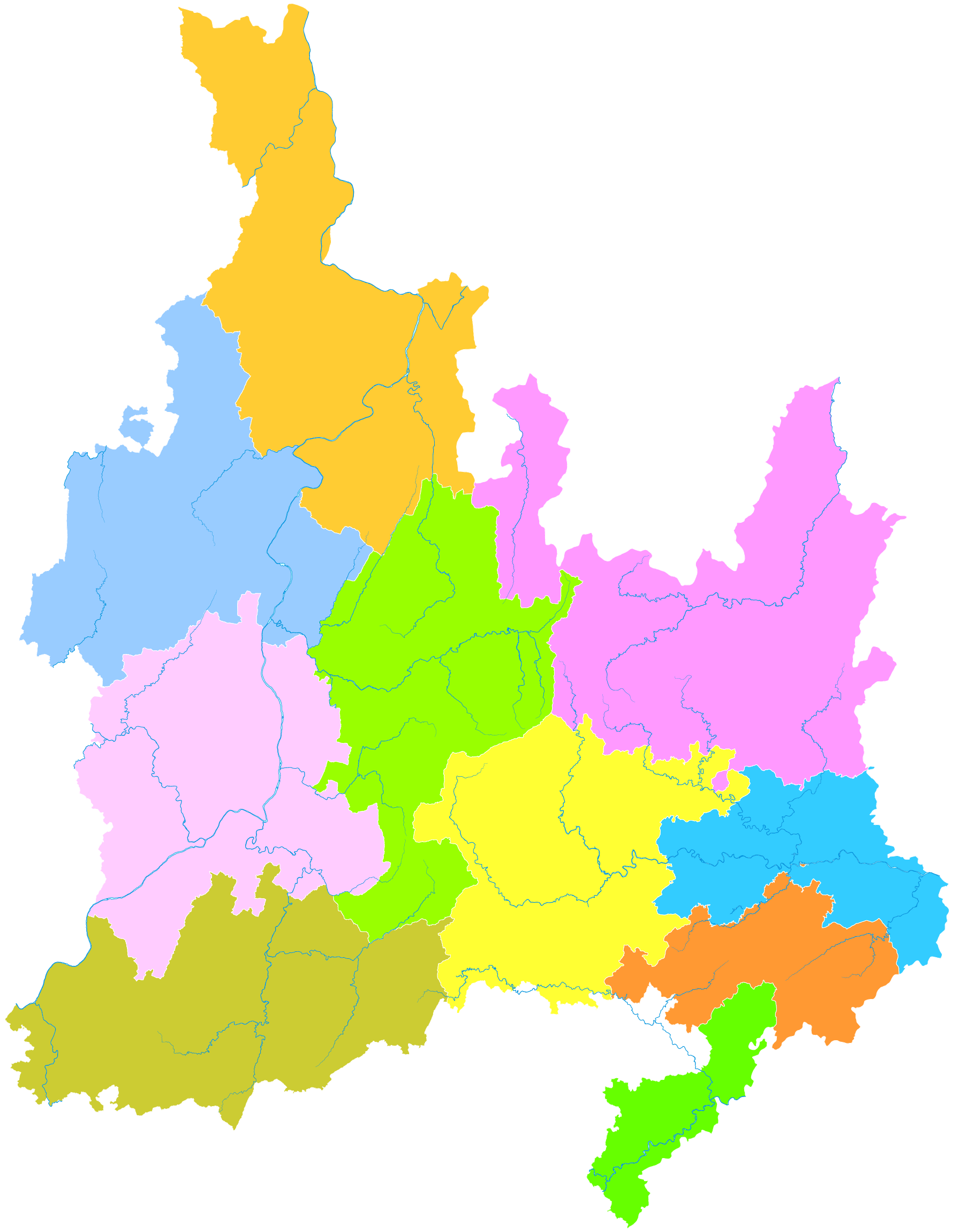

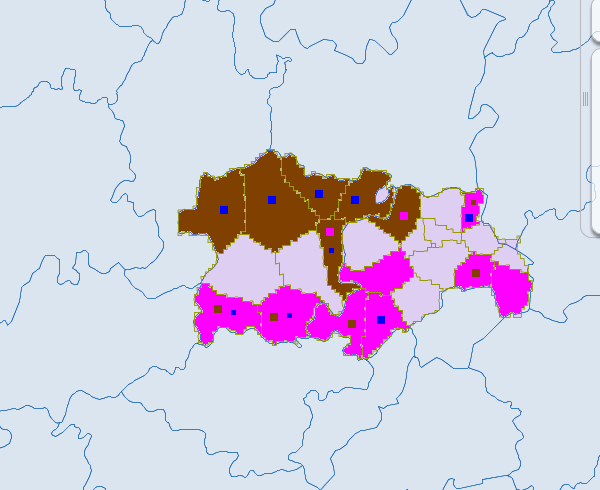
Blue - miao. Brown- tujia. red - dong

== Climate ==
Tongren is located inland with a mid-subtropical monsoon humid climate. Spring temperatures are variable with frequent drizzle, and summers are hot and sunny. Autumn brings rapid temperature drops with cloudy and rainy weather, while winter is relatively mild with a long frost-free period. The annual average temperature is around 18 degrees Celsius. The coldest month is January, with an average temperature of 2 to 6 degrees Celsius, and the hottest month is July, with an average temperature of 24 to 28 degrees Celsius.

Climate data for Tongren, elevation 353 m (1,158 ft), (1991–2020 normals, extremes 1981–2010)
Month	Jan	Feb	Mar	Apr	May	Jun	Jul	Aug	Sep	Oct	Nov	Dec	Year
Record high °C (°F)	25.2 (77.4)	32.0 (89.6)	36.5 (97.7)	35.4 (95.7)	37.3 (99.1)	38.3 (100.9)	40.5 (104.9)	39.5 (103.1)	39.7 (103.5)	36.7 (98.1)	32.6 (90.7)	23.9 (75.0)	40.5 (104.9)
Mean daily maximum °C (°F)	9.1 (48.4)	12.0 (53.6)	16.7 (62.1)	22.9 (73.2)	27.0 (80.6)	29.8 (85.6)	32.9 (91.2)	32.9 (91.2)	28.9 (84.0)	22.8 (73.0)	17.6 (63.7)	11.9 (53.4)	22.0 (71.7)
Daily mean °C (°F)	5.8 (42.4)	8.0 (46.4)	12.1 (53.8)	17.7 (63.9)	21.8 (71.2)	25.2 (77.4)	27.9 (82.2)	27.5 (81.5)	23.7 (74.7)	18.2 (64.8)	13.1 (55.6)	8.0 (46.4)	17.4 (63.4)
Mean daily minimum °C (°F)	3.5 (38.3)	5.4 (41.7)	9.0 (48.2)	14.1 (57.4)	18.2 (64.8)	21.9 (71.4)	24.2 (75.6)	23.8 (74.8)	20.2 (68.4)	15.2 (59.4)	10.2 (50.4)	5.4 (41.7)	14.3 (57.7)
Record low °C (°F)	−3.6 (25.5)	−3.7 (25.3)	−2.0 (28.4)	4.2 (39.6)	8.5 (47.3)	14.2 (57.6)	16.7 (62.1)	17.1 (62.8)	12.8 (55.0)	5.0 (41.0)	−0.4 (31.3)	−3.0 (26.6)	−3.7 (25.3)
Average precipitation mm (inches)	41.2 (1.62)	46.3 (1.82)	73.8 (2.91)	122.6 (4.83)	188.1 (7.41)	222.4 (8.76)	209.8 (8.26)	129.5 (5.10)	83.7 (3.30)	86.7 (3.41)	56.3 (2.22)	31.8 (1.25)	1,292.2 (50.89)
Average precipitation days (≥ 0.1 mm)	12.0	12.5	15.6	16.5	16.9	15.5	12.3	11.0	9.1	12.0	9.9	10.0	153.3
Average snowy days	3.9	2.4	0.8	0	0	0	0	0	0	0	0	1.5	8.6
Average relative humidity (%)	75	75	76	77	78	81	77	75	76	78	77	74	77
Mean monthly sunshine hours	34.1	40.8	59.6	81.1	96.7	93.2	164.1	176.6	113.3	80.8	64.0	52.0	1,056.3
Percentage possible sunshine	10	13	16	21	23	23	39	44	31	23	20	16	23
Source: China Meteorological Administration

== Economy ==
In July 2018, the Tongren Transportation & Tourism Investment Group announced a joint venture with Hyperloop Transportation Technologies to construct a Hyperloop track in Tongren, along with an industrial research park.

== Transportation ==
The city is served by Tongren Fenghuang Airport which is located 21 kilometers from it.

== Education ==
- Tongren Polytechnic College-Tongren Vocational and Technical College is a public full-time general higher vocational college established in June 2002 with the approval of the Guizhou Provincial People's Government.
- Tongren No. 1 Middle School (Bijiang District) Tongren No. 1 Middle School in Guizhou Province was founded on April 20, 1938. The school currently has 50 classes and more than 3,000 students.
- Tongren University - The school originated from Mingde School founded in 1920 and was upgraded to a general undergraduate college in 2006.
