= G22 Qingdao–Lanzhou Expressway =

Road in China

Qingdao–Lanzhou Expressway
- 青岛－兰州高速公路
- Qinglan Expressway 青兰高速公路

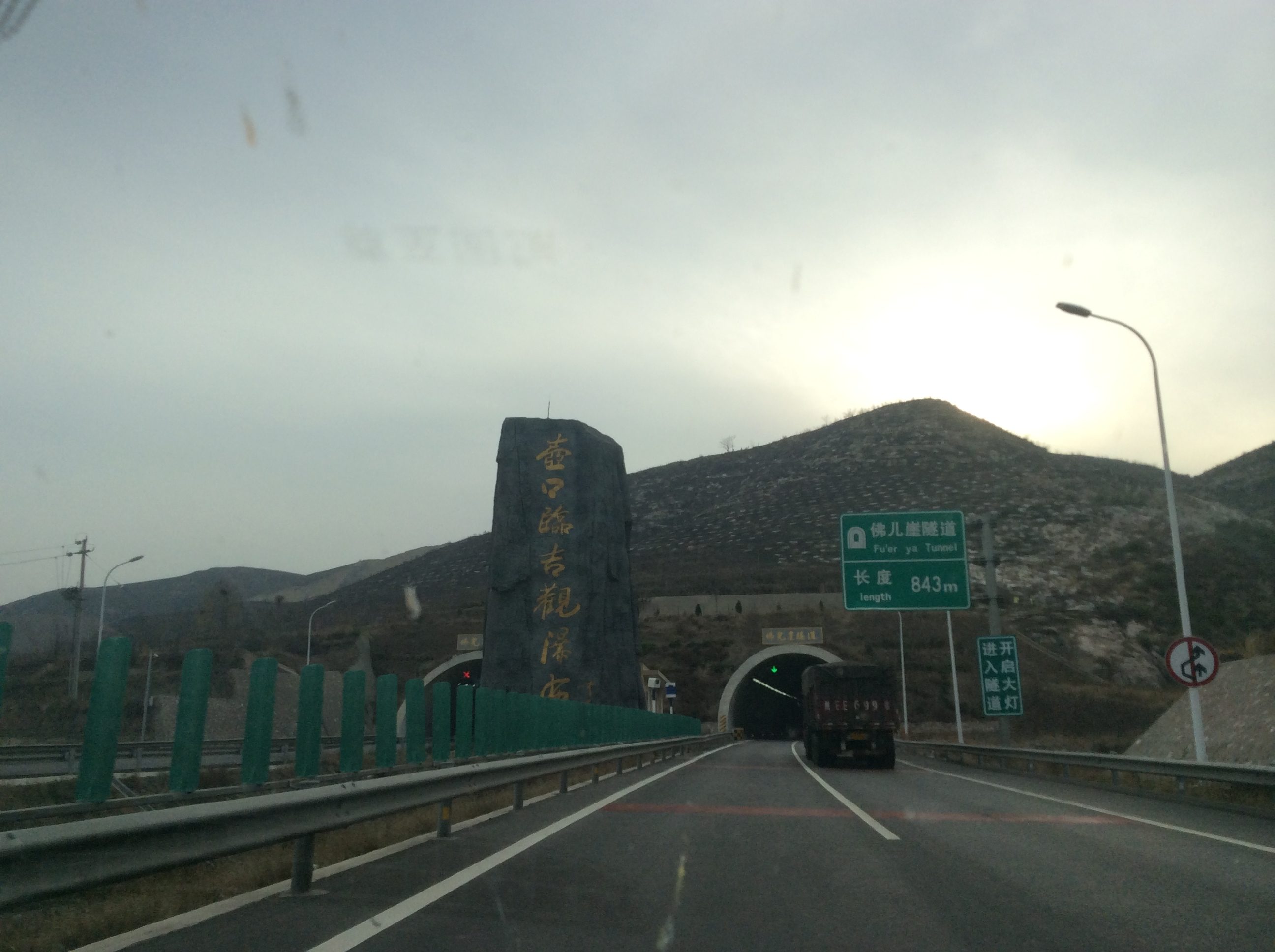
- The Fo'erkou Tunnel on the G22 Expressway, westbound from Linfen to Hukou Waterfall, Shanxi

Route information
- Length: 1,795 km (1,115 mi) Length when complete.

Major junctions
- East end: Huanwan Road in Qingdao, Shandong
- West end: G312 in Lanzhou, Gansu

Location
- Country: China

Highway system
- National Trunk Highway System; Primary; Auxiliary; National Highways; Transport in China
← G2012	→ G2201

The Qingdao–Lanzhou Expressway (Chinese: 青岛—兰州高速公路), designated as G22 and commonly referred to as the Qinglan Expressway (Chinese: 青兰高速公路) is an expressway that connects the cities of Qingdao, Shandong, China, and Lanzhou, Gansu. It is 1,795 km (1,115 mi) in length.

This expressway is sometimes called QingHong expressway (an example can be seen on a building at Handan North exit saying "QingHong expressway administration committee"). Some sources claim the "Hong" is referring to Khunjerab Pass (Hóngqílāfǔ shānkŏu), although the route west of Lanzhou is unknown.

The route of G22 between S2201 Handan Ring Expressway and Liaocheng is not clear. The northern route via Guantao County is marked G22 west of Shandong Provincial Highway 260 (in Guanxian) and Shandong Provicinal Expressway S1 (Jinan-Liaocheng) east of this point. The southern route via Daming County is marked G22 east of Shandong Provincial Highway 324 (in Dong'e) and Handan-Daming Expressway (without numbering) west of this point. Thus the sections marked G22 is not connected with each other even if there are two continuous expressways between Handan and Liaocheng.
