= Bijiang, Tongren =

Bijiang 碧江区
- District
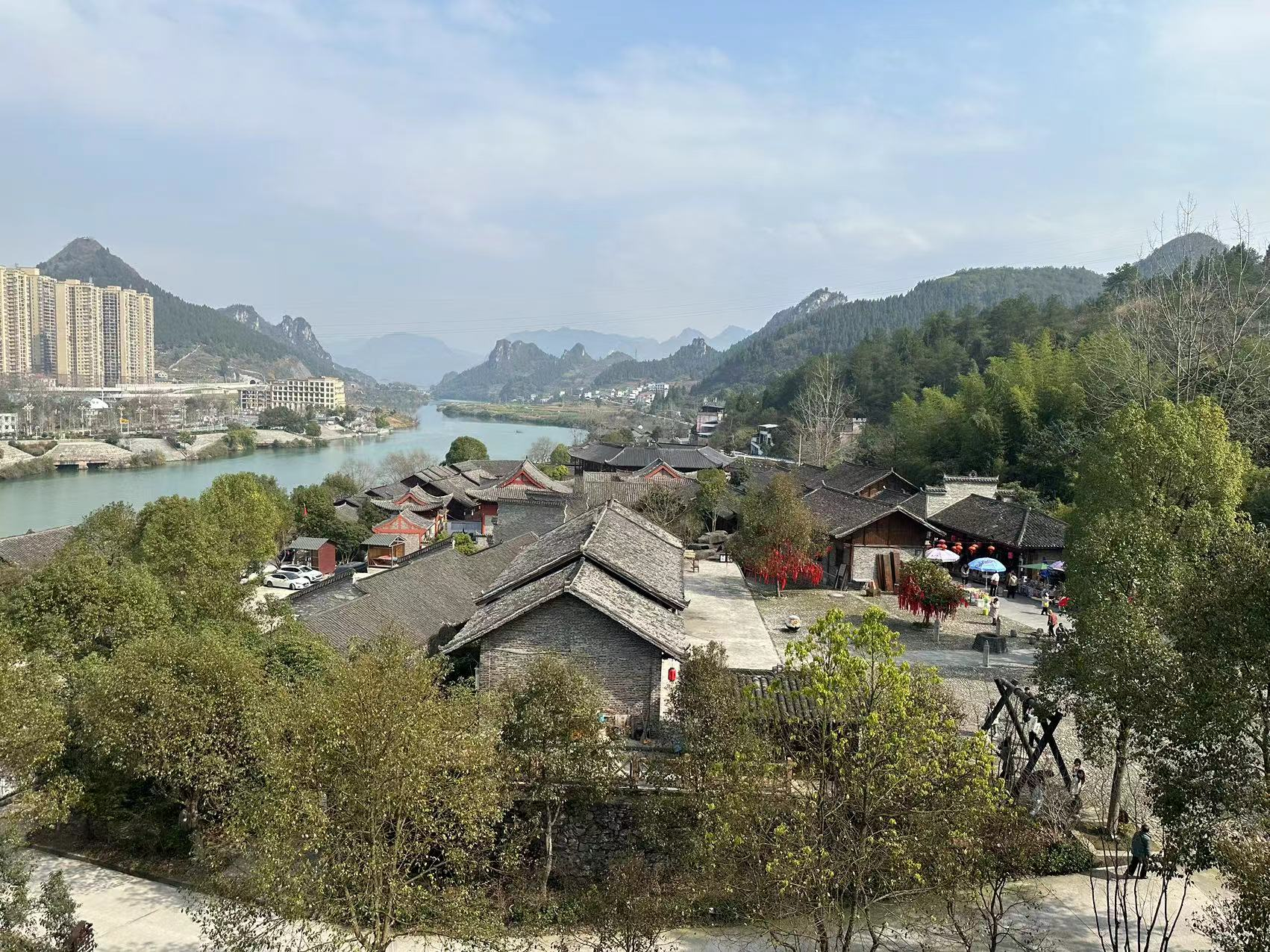

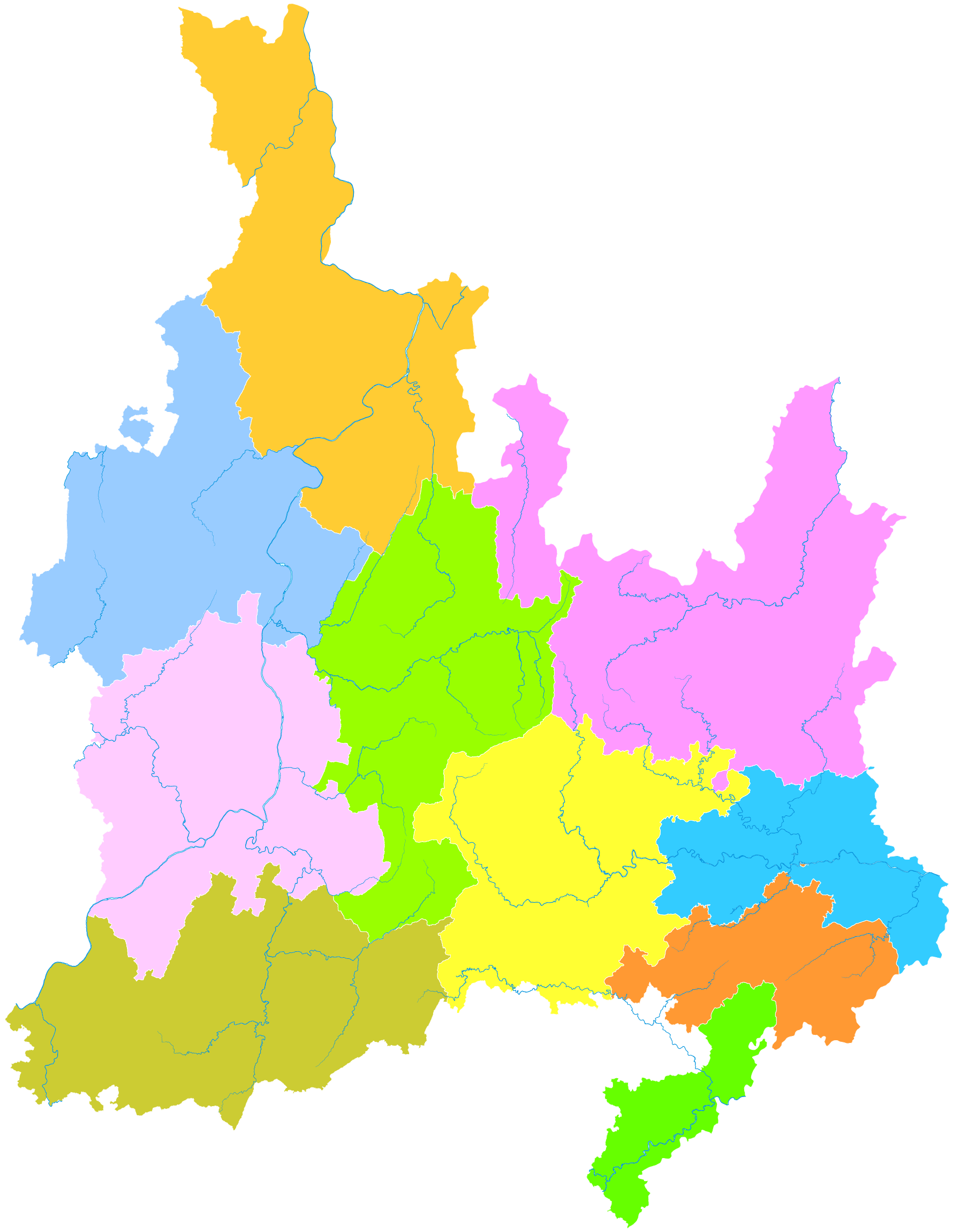
- Bijiang is the easternmost division on this map of Tongren

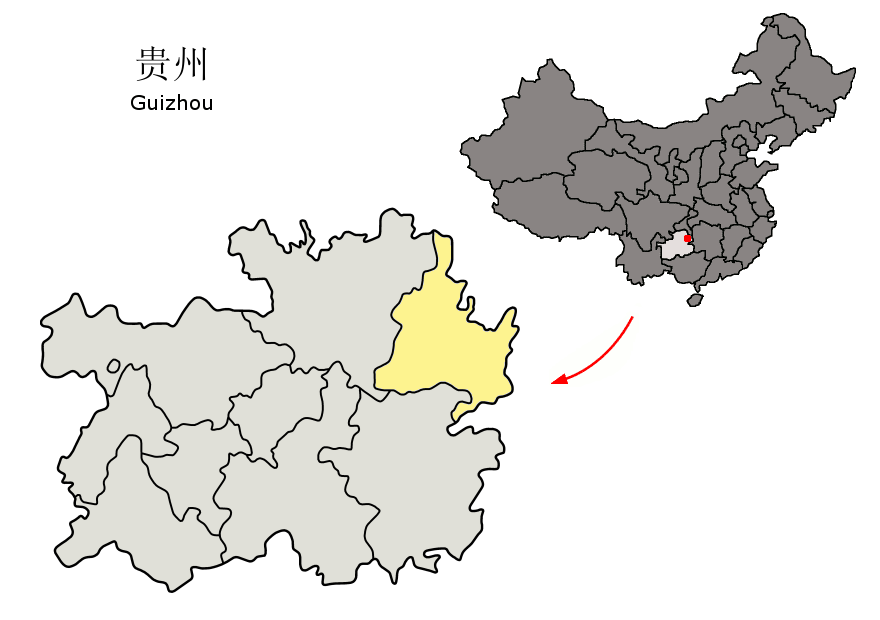
- Tongren in Guizhou

- Location within Guizhou Location within Southwest China
- Coordinates (Tongren municipal government): 27°43′54″N 109°11′22″E
- Country: China
- Province: Guizhou
- Prefecture-level city: Tongren
- District seat: Shizhong Subdistrict

Area
  - Total: 1,514 km^{2} (585 sq mi)

Population (2020 census)
  - Total: 442,076
  - Density: 292.0/km^{2} (756.3/sq mi)
- Time zone: UTC+8 (China Standard)
- Website: www.bjq.gov.cn

Bijiang District (simplified Chinese: 碧江区; traditional Chinese: 碧江區; pinyin: Bìjiāng Qū) is the seat of the city of Tongren, Guizhou province, China. The area was known as the county-level city of Tongren (铜仁市; 銅仁市; Tóngrén Shì) until November 2011, when it was renamed Bijiang District, and Tongren Prefecture converted to the prefecture-level city of Tongren. The district has an area of 1,514 square kilometres (585 sq mi).

== Administration ==
Bijiang District is divided into 7 subdistricts, 3 towns and 5 ethnic townships:

- Shizhong Subdistrict (市中街道)
- Huanbei Subdistrict (环北街道)
- Hexi Subdistrict (河西街道)
- Dengta Subdistrict (灯塔街道)
- Chuandong Subdistrict (川硐街道)
- Tongxing Subdistrict (铜兴街道)
- Zhengguang Subdistrict (正光街道)
- Bahuang Town (坝黄镇)
- Yunchangping Town (云场坪镇)
- Yangtou Town (漾头镇)
- Tongmu Dong Ethnic Township (桐木坪侗族乡)
- Huashi Dong, Miao and Tujia Ethnic Township (滑石侗族苗族土家族乡)
- Heping Tujia and Dong Ethnic Township (和平土家族侗族乡)
- Wawu Dong Ethnic Township (瓦屋侗族乡)
- Liulongshan Dong and Tujia Ethnic Township (六龙山侗族土家族乡)

== Education ==
Institutions in Chuandong Education Park (川硐教育园区), Bijiang District include:

- Tongren Polytechnic College
- Tongren No.1 Middle School
