= G65 Baotou–Maoming Expressway =

Expressway in China

Baotou–Maoming Expressway
- 包头－茂名高速公路
- Baomao Expressway 包茂高速公路

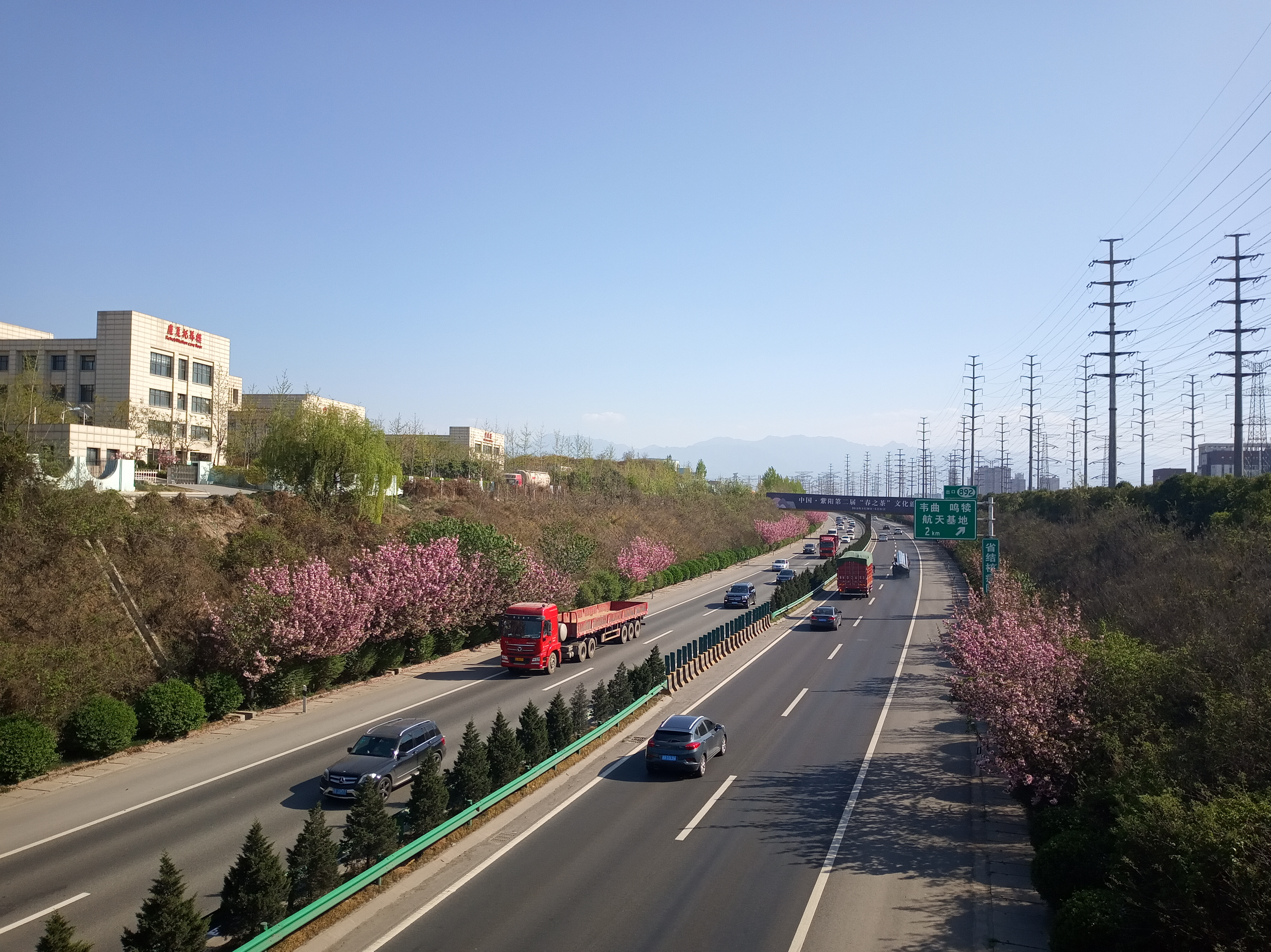
- G65 in Xi'an

Route information
- Length: 3,017 km (1,875 mi) Length when complete.

Major junctions
- North end: G6 Beijing–Lhasa Expressway and S211 Baobai Highway, Baotou, Inner Mongolia
- South end: Dianbai District, Guangdong

Location
- Country: China

Highway system
- National Trunk Highway System; Primary; Auxiliary; National Highways; Transport in China
← G6025	→ G6511

The Baotou–Maoming Expressway (Chinese: 包頭－茂名高速公路), designated as G65 and commonly referred to as the Baomao Expressway (Chinese: 包茂高速公路) is an expressway that connects the Chinese cities of Baotou, Inner Mongolia, and Maoming, Guangdong. When fully complete, it will be 3,017 km (1,875 mi) in length.

Many sections of the expressway are still under construction. The sections of the expressways that are complete are:

- From Baotou to the Shaanxi border in Inner Mongolia
- From the Inner Mongolia border to Ankang in Shaanxi
- From Dazhou in Sichuan to Chongqing
- From Guilin to Cenxi in Guangxi

== Route ==
The route passes through the following cities:

Baotou, Ordos, Yulin, Yan'an, Tongchuan, Xi'an, Ankang, Dazhou, Chongqing, Qianjiang, Jishou, Huaihua, Guilin, Wuzhou, Maoming

Due to the challenging terrain the expressway includes numerous tunnels and bridges including the Aizhai Bridge which spans over 1 km.

== Gallery ==
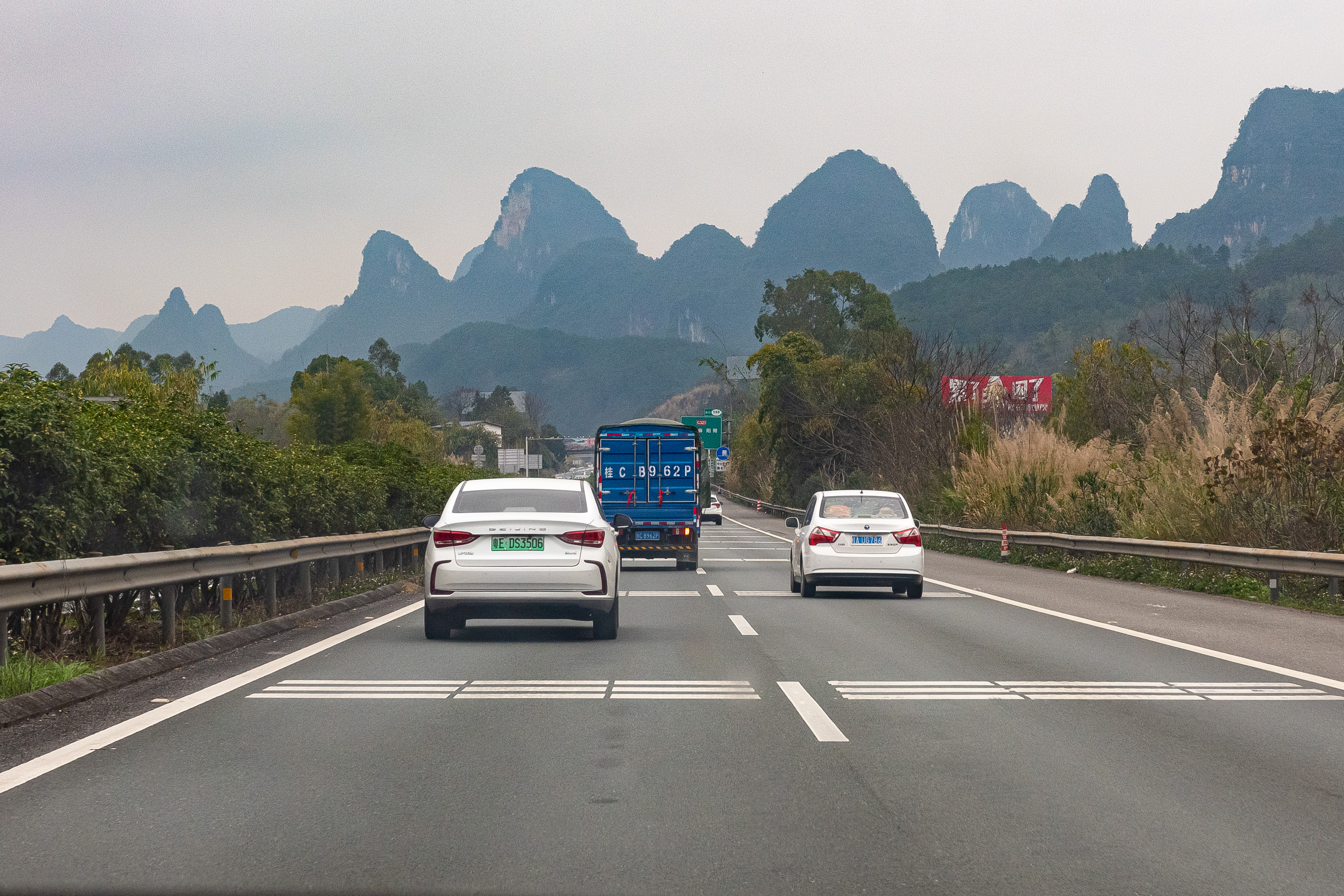
G65 in Yangshuo County, Guangxi

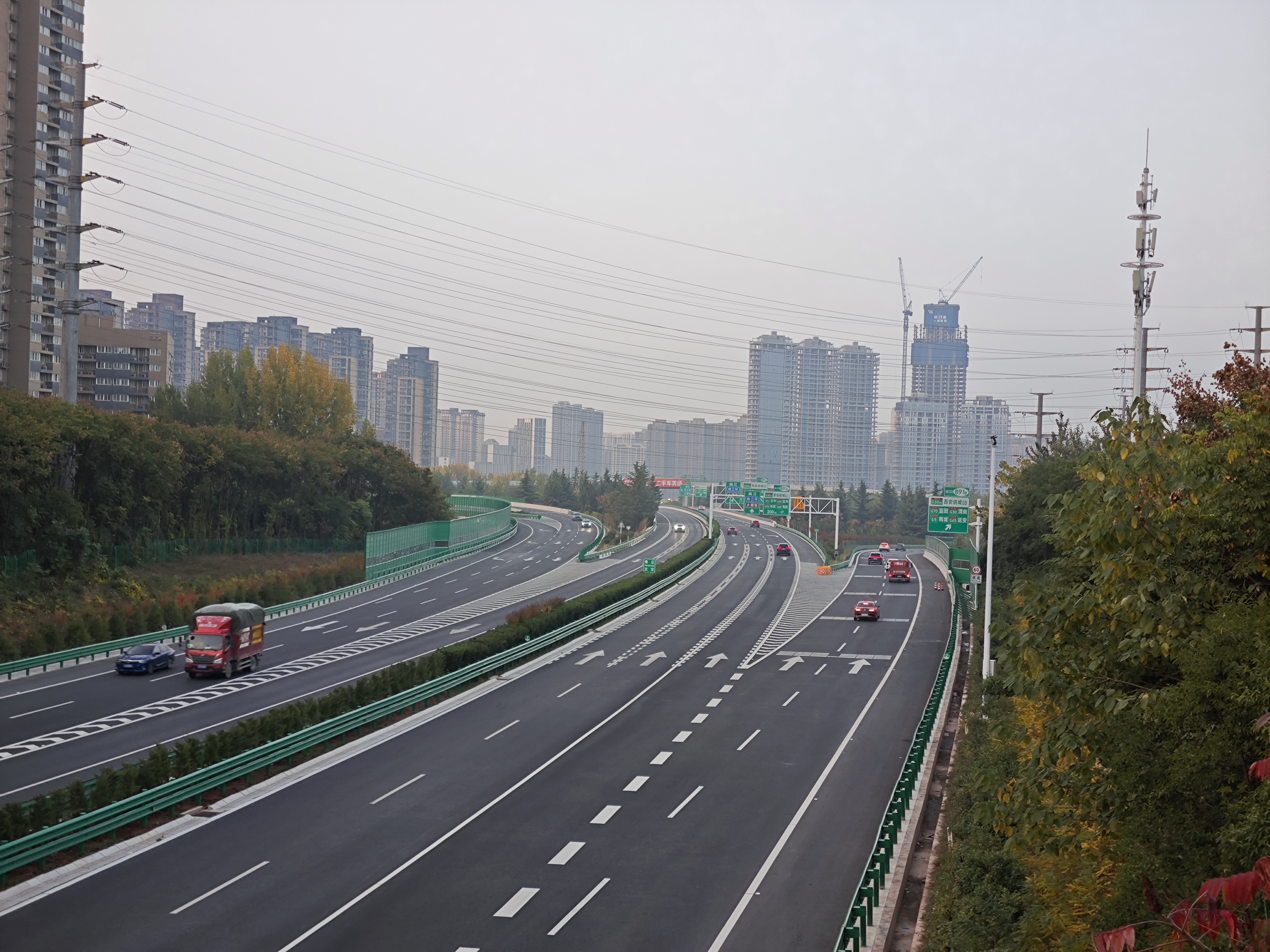
G65 in Xi'an

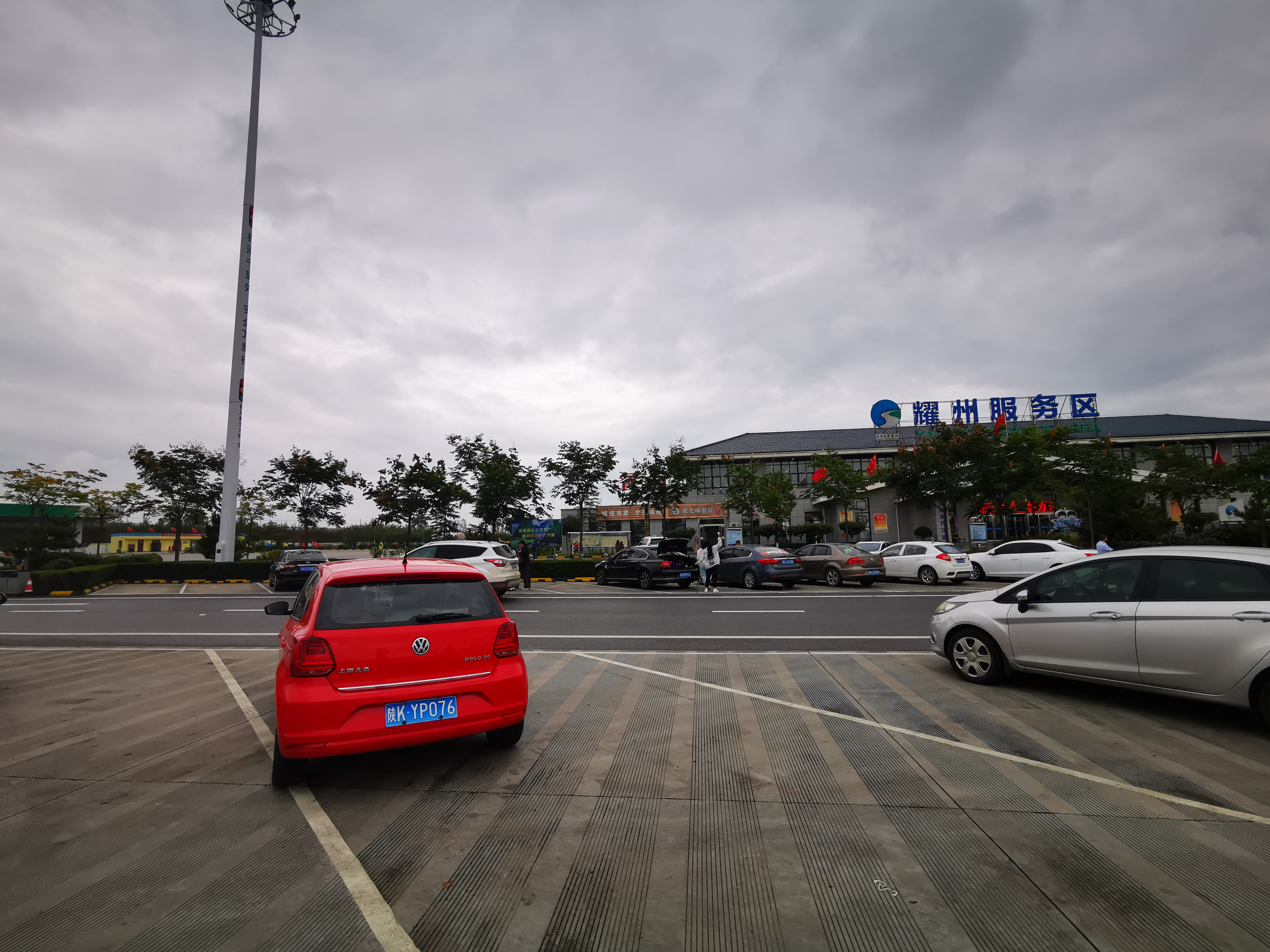
A service area in Tongchuan, Shaanxi

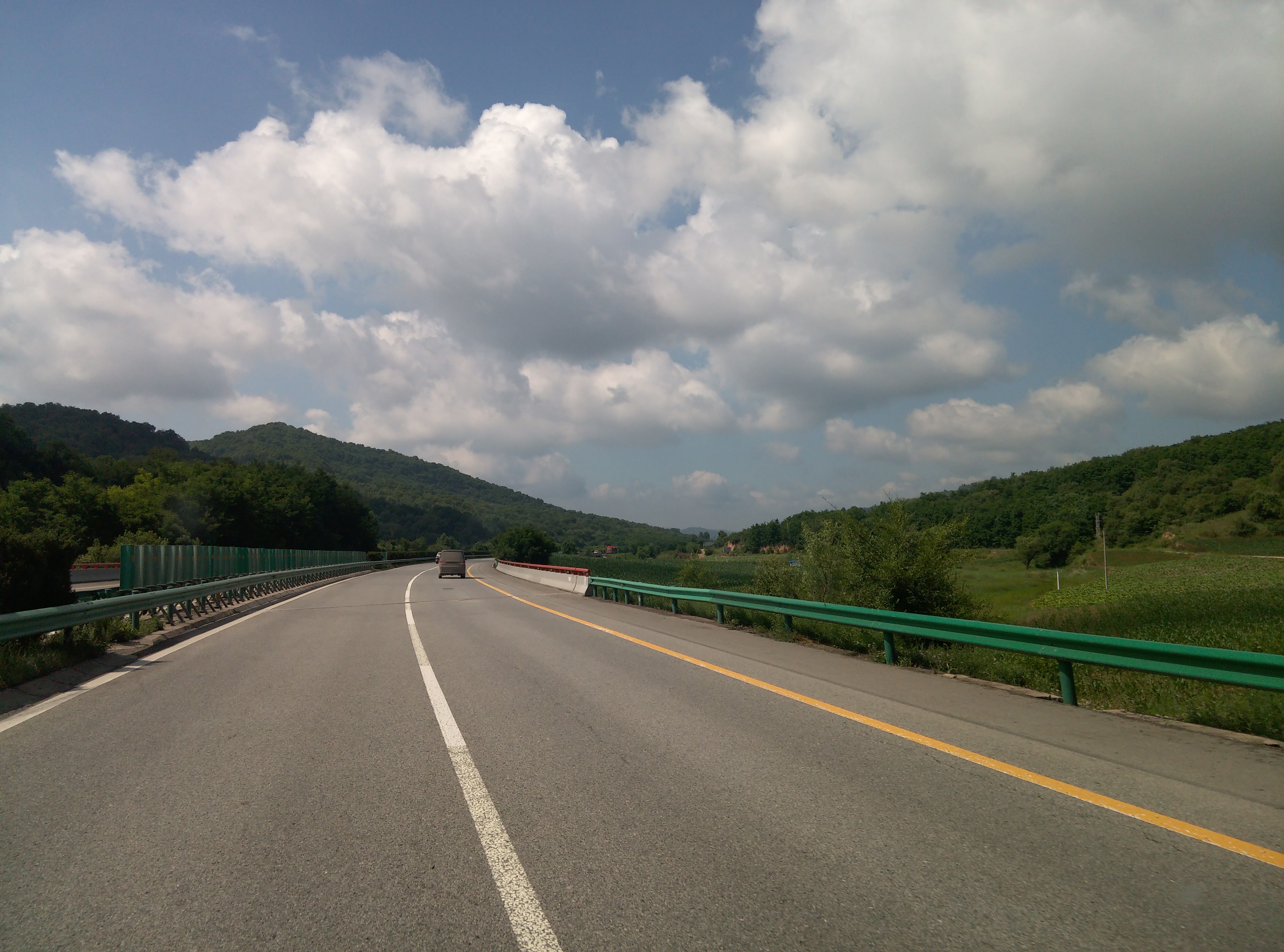
A section in Fu County, Shaanxi
