= Yanchuan County =

Yanchuan 延川县 Yenchwan
- County
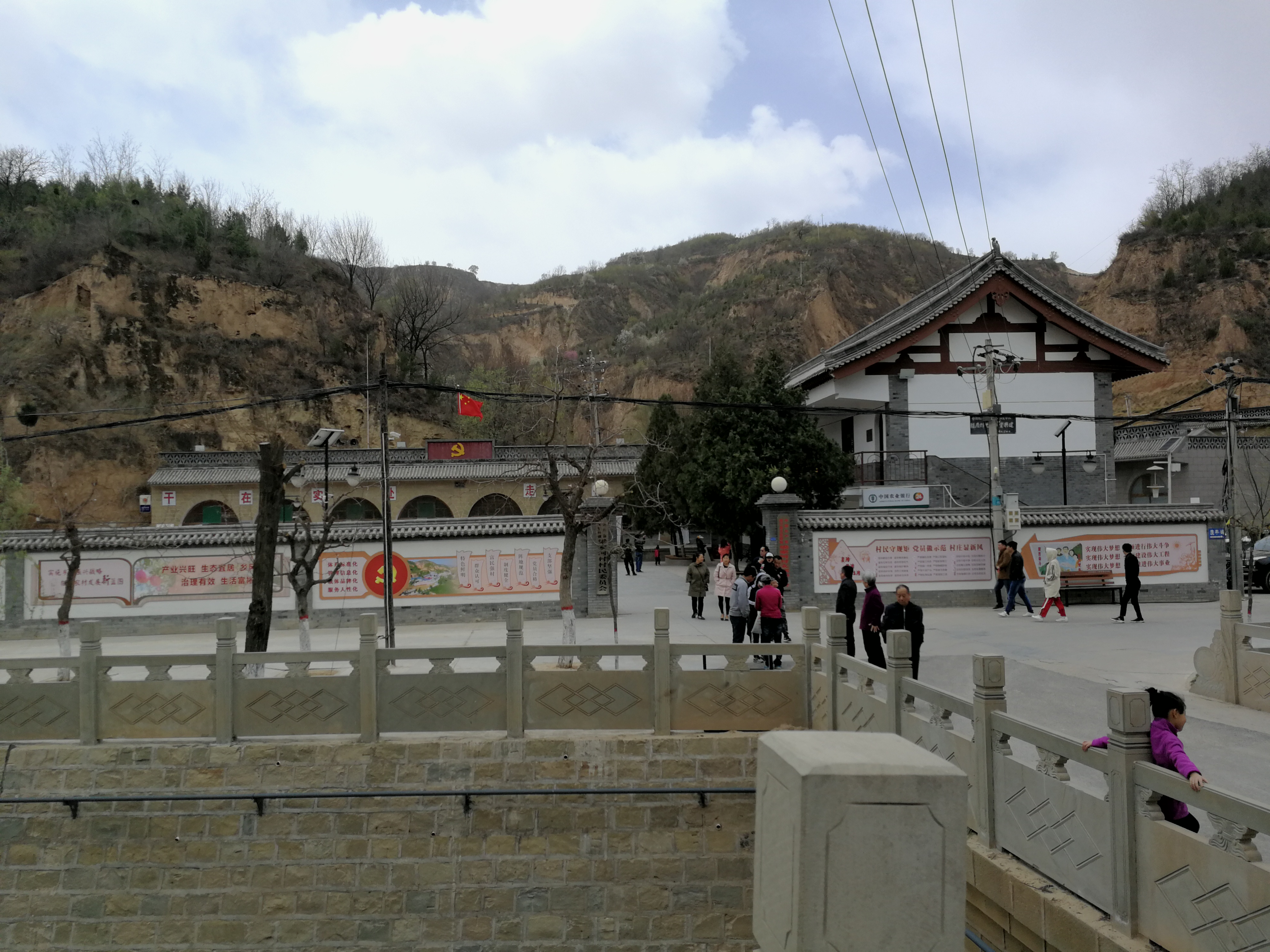
- Liangjiahe Village

- Yanchuan in Yan'an

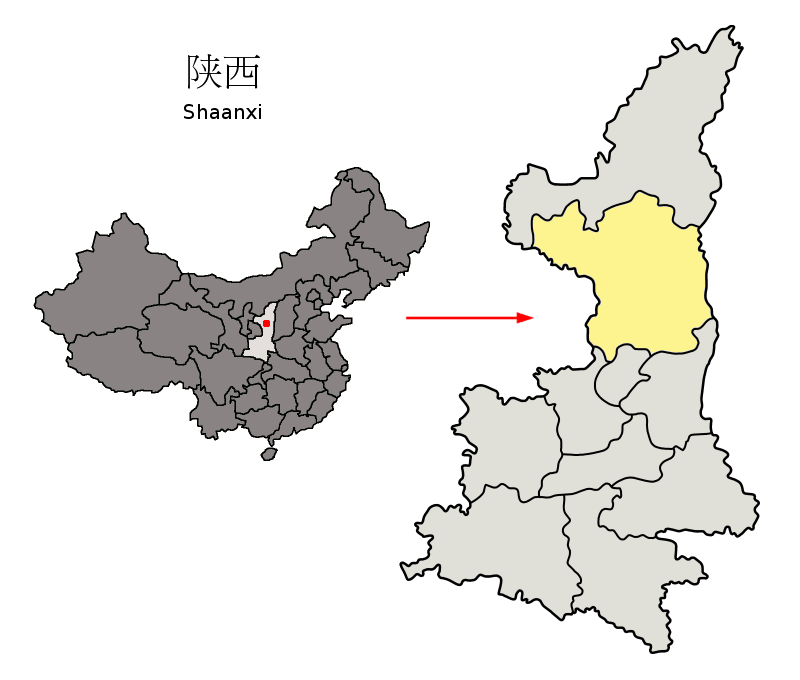
- Yan'an in Shaanxi
- Coordinates (Yanchuan County government): 36°52′41″N 110°11′37″E
- Country: People's Republic of China
- Province: Shaanxi
- Prefecture-level city: Yan'an

Area
  - Total: 1,985 km^{2} (766 sq mi)

Population (2019)
  - Total: 170,100
  - Density: 85.69/km^{2} (221.9/sq mi)
- Time zone: UTC+8 (China Standard)
- Postal code: 717200

Yanchuan County (simplified Chinese: 延川县; traditional Chinese: 延川縣; pinyin: Yánchuān Xiàn) is a county under the administration of the prefecture-level city of Yan'an, in the northeast of Shaanxi Province, bordering Shanxi Province across the Yellow River to the east. The county spans 1,985 square kilometres (766 mi^{2}) in area, and has a permanent population of 170,100 people as of 2019. In 1969, Xi Jinping was sent to work in Liangjiahe Village, Wen'anyi, Yanchuan County, as part of Mao Zedong's Down to the Countryside Movement. This has launched the county into the national spotlight, making the area a tourist site for many.

== History ==
Archeological artefacts dating back to the 22nd century BCE, which include knives, axes, adzes, sickles, pots, bowls, and various examples of clay and brick pottery, have been found within the county.

The area of present-day Yanchuan County once belonged to the Beidi state of Zhai. King Wen of Zhou attempted to attack the Zhai in the 17th year of Di Yi's reign (circa 1084 BCE). A number of settlements from the late Shang dynasty era have been discovered in what is now the town of Yongping. Other settlements from the slightly later Western Zhou era have been found in Wanjiahe Village (Chinese: 王家河村), Yanshuiguan.

In 635 BCE, Duke Wen of Jin, ruler of the state of Jin, seized the area of present-day Yanchuan County from the Zhai.

In 403 BCE, the Jin split into the Han, the Zhao, and the Wei, with the Wei inheriting the area, and incorporating it as the Shang Commandery. Nearly a century later, in 328 BCE, the Qin state (not to be confused with the later Qin dynasty), took the area from the Wei.

During the Qin dynasty, the northwest portion of present-day Yanchuan County was administered as Yangzhou County (Chinese: 阳周县), whereas the southeast portion was administered as Gaonu County.

In December 206 CE, Xiang Yu appointed Dong Yi to rule the area under a newly organized Zhai state. However, it quickly fell under control of the Han dynasty, which resumed administering the area as Gaonu County in the Shang Commandery in August of the following year.

In 158 BCE, an army of 30,000 Xiongnu warriors briefly invaded the area.

In 120 BCE, Emperor Wu of Han ordered 700,000 disaster victims to move to northern lands, including the Shang Commandery.

In 9 CE, under the shortly lived Xin dynasty, Emperor Wang Mang renamed Gaonu County to Pingli County (Chinese: 平利县), a change which was subsequently reverted when the Han dynasty reassumed control of the area.

The Xiongnu invaded the area again in 140 CE, this time proving more successful, and established prolonged control of the region.

In 319 CE, Shi Le established the Later Zhao, and took control of the area. However, the Later Zhao's control proved to be short lived, and the Former Qin, led by Fu Hong, conquered the area in 350 CE. This too proved to be transitory, with Yao Chang of the Later Qin taking the area in 384 CE. In 407 CE, just 23 years later, Helian Bobo, the Xiongnu leader of the Great Xia, assumed control of the area. Around this time, Linhe County (Chinese: 临河县) was established in present-day Wangjiaqu Village (Chinese: 王家渠村) in Yanshuiguan. In 431 CE, Emperor Taiwu conquered the Great Xia, and incorporated it into the Xianbei state of the Northern Wei. The Northern Wei maintained control of the area for about a century, and even reorganized the area's administrative divisions in 513 CE, incorporating the western portion of present-day Yanchuan County as Guangwu County (Chinese: 广武县), and the eastern portion as Shuofang County (Chinese: 朔方县). Following the collapse of the Northern Wei, the Western Wei reorganized the area in 537 CE under the Wen'an Commandery. The Wen'an Commandery administered three counties: Wen'an County (Chinese: 文安县), Yixiang County (Chinese: 义乡县), and Guang'an County (Chinese: 广安县). The administrative center of the Wen'an Commandery was located in present-day Wen'anyi. In 552, under Emperor Fei, former Linhe County was reorganized as Anmin County (Chinese: 安民县), under the jurisdiction of the Anning Commandery.

In 583 CE, the Sui dynasty abolished Wen'an Commandery, and replaced Wen'an County with Yanchuan County (same name as the present-day county), after Tuyanshui (Chinese: 吐延水), the former name of Qingjian River. The county fell under the jurisdiction of the zhou of Yanzhou, and the administrative center of the county is located in the same area as the contemporary urban core of Yanchuan County. Anmin County was replaced with Jiwan County (simplified Chinese: 吉万县; traditional Chinese: 吉萬縣), which was abolished in 607 CE. Yanzhou was also abolished in 607 CE, and was replaced with the Yan'an Commandery. In 617 CE, Liang Shidu, the leader of a peasant rebellion which proclaimed themselves to be the state of Liang (Chinese: 梁国), took control of Yanchuan County, and briefly reorganized the county as Wenzhou (Chinese: 文州).

In 619 CE, shortly after the establishment of the Tang dynasty, Tang general Duan Decao conquered Wenzhou. He then split Wenzhou into a number of different zhou: Jizhou (Chinese: 基州) was formed from the southwest portion, Xihezhou (Chinese: 西和州) was formed from the southeast portion, and Nanpingzhou (Chinese: 南平州) was formed from the northeast portion. Xihezhou would administer three counties: a new iteration of Anmin County (same name as the previous one), Xiuwen County (Chinese: 修文县), and Sangyuan County (Chinese: 桑园县). Nanpingzhou would administer Yimen County (simplified Chinese: 义门县; traditional Chinese: 義門縣) and Chengping County (Chinese: 城平县). However, just two years later, Nanpingzhou was abolished and merged into Jizhou, which was renamed Beijizhou (Chinese: 北基州) in the subsequent year. Suizhou was established in the center of present-day Yanchuan County in 623 CE, but had its administrative center moved the following year. In 628 CE, Xihezhou was abolished, and both Xiuwen County and Sangyuan County were merged into Anmin County, which was renamed Anren County (Chinese: 安人县) and transferred to Beijizhou. The same year, Chengping County was transferred from Beijizhou to Suizhou. In 634 CE, Beijizhou was abolished, and reorganized as Yanchuan County (same name as the present-day county) and Anren County, both of which were placed under the resurrected Anzhou (same name as the previous iteration). In 648 CE, Anren County was renamed to Hongfeng County (Chinese: 弘风县).

In 660, Bai Tieyu, a Jihu Buddhist from Yanchuan County, proclaimed himself Holy Emperor of the Guangming (Chinese: 光明圣皇帝; pinyin: Guāngmíng Shèng Huángdì), and started a local rebellion. Bai experienced moderate military success, and his supported also occupied nearby Chengping County in Suizhou in April 683 CE.

Hongfeng County was renamed to Yanshui County (Chinese: 延水县) in 705 CE.

During one span in 895 CE, the area experienced 60 days of consecutive rain.

After the Tang dynasty, the area belonged to the Later Tang, which employed the Zhangwu Army to rule the area. Subsequently, the area was incorporated into the Northern Song.

On May 14, 962 CE, a severe episode of frost killed the region's crops.

In 976 CE, both Yanchuan County and Yanshui County were placed under the jurisdiction of Yan'an Fu again.

A village known as Chengping (Chinese: 承平寨) was established in contemporary Yongping in 1038, which was attacked by the Western Xia the following year. However, this attack failed, and the Western Xia forces retreated. The Western Xia laid siege to the city of Yanzhou (in present-day Baota District) on January 18, 1040, and leaders from Chengping sent a large army of over 1,000 to aid in the city's defense. Conflicts between the Western Xia and local Northern Song leaders continued through the late 1090s.

In 1075, Yanshui County was abolished and merged into Yanchuan County as a town. During this time, Yanchuan County included areas belonging to present-day Zichang and Zizhou County.

Around 1078, a large portion of the Yellow River's banks in Yanshuiguan collapsed, revealing large amounts of ancient plant fossils. Scientist Shen Kuo travelled to this site in 1080 and 1081 to examine the fossils and petroleum, which he documented in his book Dream Pool Essays.

Yanzhou, the zhou which had been governing the counties of the area, was abolished in 1089, and replaced with Yan'an Fu under the new system of Fu. Yan'an Fu remained largely intact from 1089 up until 1913, when it was replaced with Yulin Circuit as part of the Republic of China's short-lived system of circuits.

In 1128, Jin dynasty armies occupied Yanchuan County, although they left the existing administrative structure intact.

In 1252, the town of Anding was split off of Yanchuan as its own county, which would later become Zichang.

A plague of locusts destroyed the area's crops in May 1404. The county's food supply was again thrown into jeopardy in the autumn of 1428, when a severe episode of frost destroyed the autumn harvest.

In 1466, the county magistrate built two bridges outside the county center's southern gates: the Tongji Bridge (Chinese: 通济桥) and the Huimin Bridge (Chinese: 惠民桥).

A severe drought struck the area from January to June 1521. Another severe drought struck the area in 1528, which was followed by intense floods and waterlogging. The following year, the county magistrate built a grain warehouse to try to prevent famine.

Around 1546 and 1547, the county magistrate built two forts to protect the area from invasion: one in Yongping, and the other in Wen'anyi. Two castles were also built in the county in 1551.

A severe episode of hail struck the county on July 23, 1549. The hail damaged buildings in the county, and injured many farm animals and humans. A drought and subsequent famine afflicted in the region in 1572, resulting in incidents of cannibalism. Furthermore, a major earthquake shook the area in 1591, and another one occurred in 1621.

From April to June 1628, severe drought afflicted the region, causing great economic harm and famine. That year, a peasant rebellion led by Hun Tianwang and Wang Ziyong broke out in the county. Hun and Wang conquered Yanchuan County, as well as Yanzhou, Qingjian County, and Mizhi County by the following year. At that point, Ming general Du Wenhuan was sent to crush the rebellion. In June 1630, the government of Yan'an Fu sent military leaders Zhang Nian and Dusi Aimu (Chinese: 都司艾穆) to put down the rebellion. However, the government response further plunged the area into instability. By the summer of 1630, a famine broke out in the region, and on December 22, 1630, Du Wenhuan led a massacre of 199 civilians in Yanchuan. The combined effects of the military conflict and famine resulted in Yanchuan's population declining by two-thirds. In November 1631, a 14-day long snowstorm hit Yanchuan County, killing a large number of farm animals and humans. By July 1632, Ming armies finally encircled Hun Tianwang's army in present-day Yanshuiguan. The resulting battle in Yanshuiguan killed approximately 620 soldiers. By the summer of 1633, Grand Coordinator Chen Qiyu led Ming armies to crush the remaining rebels in Yongning, resulting in a battle which killed over 1,600 soldiers, and, upon victory, saw the capture of about 550 rebel soldiers. That same year, locust swarms afflicted the region.

=== Qing dynasty ===
Another famine afflicted the region greatly in 1640.

During the early days of the Qing dynasty, rebel leader Wang Yongqiang led a local unsuccessful rebellion against the nascent dynasty. In March 1649, his forces occupied the center of Yanchuan County.

Severe flooding destroyed much of Yanchuan's center in 1660, destroying the city's north gate and eastern wall.

The county witnessed a solar eclipse on the morning of April 1, 1688.

A locust plague destroyed much of the region's crops in 1691.

An earthquake struck the county on April 6, 1695.

On June 4, 1701, a large flood destroyed much of the county's main city, including the north gate.

Another drought in the region took place in 1721, resulting in widespread famine and mass emigration from the area. The following year, voles ate and destroyed much of the region's crops, resulting in more famine and emigration.

Drought once again struck the region in 1759, resulting in more famine.

An academy was built by the county magistrate in 1786 called the Dengfeng Academy (Chinese: 登峰书院).

In December 1787, the Yellow River, which is nearly perpetually a dark murky color due to high amounts of loess sediment in the river, underwent a brief period of being unusually clear.

A severe famine struck the region in 1790.

Major flooding on August 29, 1800, once again destroyed the county city's north gate, and submerged the village of Guaimao (Chinese: 拐峁村).

On August 4, 1811, the northwestern portion of the county suffered severe damage from a hail storm.

Unusually cold weather afflicted the county in September 1836, leading to widespread frost and partial crop failures.

Dungan rebels captured the county on September 15, 1867. The following day, Dungan rebels continued their advances to the north, while Nian rebels moved west into the area. Simultaneously, an outbreak of dysentery spread through the region, killing many. Heavy rains and hail during July 1869 killed many of the county's crops, and resulted in a partial failure of the county's autumn harvest. Around that time, an epidemic spread through the area, killing many. Over the next two years, a number of wolves killed and ate a number of people, and bandits proliferated. Severe famine struck the region in 1877, killing most of the local population, and leading to widespread cannibalism.

Yi Academy (Chinese: 义学院) was established in Wen'anyi Village (Chinese: 文安驿村) in 1904.

Throughout the summer and autumn of 1909, constant rain and hail leads to widespread flooding.

In the early years of the 20th century, many institutions in Yanchuan County began undergoing widespread westernization. In 1904, Christianity was introduced to Yanchuan County, with churches being constructed in the county center, Yongping, and Yanshuiguan. In 1908, the county magistrate established a western-styled school on the site of the former Dengfeng Academy. Perhaps in response to the introduction of western-styled education, a new sishu, a traditional type of Chinese school which emphasized classical Chinese literature and Confucian studies, was established in present-day Jiajiaping in 1911. A western-style post office was established in the county center in 1910.

Despite these reforms, or perhaps because of them, the county soon found itself engaged in a prolonged period of warlordism. On September 12, 1911, peasant rebels from nearby Yichuan County occupied Wen'anyi, and soon took control of the county center. Ten days later, the Shaanxi Revolutionary Party (Chinese: 陕西革命党) declared the establishment of the Shaanxi Military Government (Chinese: 陕西军政府) in Xi'an. The group soon established control in Yanchuan County.

=== Republic of China ===
Upon the establishment of the Republic of China in 1912, the new government ordered local officials to rid themselves of the queue hairstyle required by the Qing dynasty and encourage common folk to follow. This proved particularly effective in Yanchuan County, where few kept their queues.

Yan'an Fu was abolished in 1913, resulting in Yanchuan County falling under the jurisdiction of the newly formed Yulin Circuit.

A geological survey was conducted in Yongping in 1914, with the hopes of discovering petroleum reserves.

Yanchuan County remained highly prone to banditry and warlords throughout the early years of the Republican government. In Yanchuan County alone, more than 700 people were killed by bandits from 1912 to 1920. On February 16, 1916, bandit leader Gao Huozi (Chinese: 高豁子) set off from Wayaobu to the county, and passed through Yongping, where he robbed locals partaking in a traditional yangge dance. Two days later, he arrived at the county center, where he occupied the county government and slaughtered more than 20 people. That evening, he moved on to Wen'anyi, before fleeing south the following day. In February 1917, a military party led by local warlord Guo Jian passed through the region en route to Yulin, and briefly resided in the center of Yanchuan County. On February 14, 1918, government general Dang Zhongzhao (Chinese: 党仲昭) led an operation to hunt down a large group of bandits in the region. By February 21, he had chased the group of bandits to Dangjiagou (Chinese: 党家沟), an area within Yanchuan County, where he engaged them in battle. Dang succeeded, causing the remaining bandits to flee. In 1918, the county government organized a defense team to combat local bandits.

In June 1918, flooding hit the county, destroying two stone bridges: Guaimao Bridge (Chinese: 拐峁桥) and Heilongguan Bridge (Chinese: 黑龙关桥).

An earthquake hit the county on the night of December 16, 1920. The earthquake cut off many sources, and the days following the earthquake were unusually hot.

In 1924, a handful of students from the county who went to secondary school in larger cities throughout Shaanxi returned to Yanchuan County and began spreading ideology from the May Fourth Movement and New Culture Movement. The following year, three students who went to secondary school in nearby Suide County became the first residents of Yanchuan to join the Chinese Communist Party. In July 1926, the Chinese Communist party established a branch in Yanchuan County. In November that same year, the Kuomintang established a county branch.

Westernization reforms continued during this time, with a county magistrate campaign to prevent foot binding and a primary school for women both being established in 1926. In 1927, schools were established in Wen'anyi and Yongping. However, resistance to perceived cultural imperialism continued throughout the county, with a demonstration against a Protestant church in March 1927 attracting more than 50 protestors. The Communist Party, which helped organize the demonstration against the church, also began protesting in schools, organizing peasant associations (Chinese: 农民协会; pinyin: nóngmín xiéhuì), and forming another branch of the party in Yangjiagetai later that year. On October 13, 1927, Communist guerilla fighters partaking in the nearby Qingjian Uprising camped out in the county, before moving on to nearby Yanchang County. Despite increasing crackdowns on Communist Party agitators, the party's strength grew in the following years, with party members organizing a student strike at a school in May 1929, and organizing nearly 1,000 peasants to lay siege to the county center for four consecutive days in July 1929 to protest food insecurity.

Yulin Circuit was abolished in 1928, and the area then fell under direct provincial administration.

In March 1930, the county government began construction of the Zhongshan Bridge (Chinese: 中山大桥) over the Wen'anyi River (Chinese: 文安驿河).

Severe hail afflicted the county in 1930.

A battle between Communist guerrillas and Nationalist soldiers took place in Yongping on October 8, 1931, killing three. Another skirmish between the two forces took place in Chakou Village (Chinese: 岔口村) two days later, killing at least one. Guerrilla activity in the county continued the following year, with Communist forces capturing Yongping on April 18, 1932. Following the capture of the town, the local guerilla forces held a meeting where they proclaimed themselves to be part of the Chinese Red Army. On May 20, a Red Army Commander was killed by a member of a local Gelaohui, a secret society association first started in opposition to the Qing dynasty. Deadly conflicts between the two sides continued throughout 1933 and 1934, although they continued to be a smaller scale. Two units of Red Army troops defeated two units of Mintuan, local pro-Nationalist militias, in the village of Gaojiagetai (Chinese: 高家圪台村) on October 1, 1934.

January 1935 proved to be a successful month for the Communist Party, which began building organizations in numerous villages throughout the county. On January 20, nine units of the Red Army defeated a detachment of nine Mintuan units, and seized their commander and ammunition.

In February 1935, Chiguang County (Chinese: 赤光县) was merged into Yanchuan County.

Early in April 1935, a group of Red Army troops ambushed a Nationalist troop company in the village of Hejiawan (Chinese: 贺家湾村).

In early May, Nationalist troops abandoned the town of Yongping, and the Communist Party began organizing governing bodies in the town. On May 27, a large Red Army contingency headed by Liu Zhidan arrived in the village of Tuojiachuan (Chinese: 拓家川村), where they began preparations to take the county center. They began by luring local Mintuan forces out to the village of Ruzeyao (Chinese: 茹则崾) in Yanshui County, thereby leaving Yanchuan County's center susceptible to an attack. By June 2, the Red Army established firm control of the county center, beating back nationalist troops who were sent in from nearby Qingjian County to try to wrest back control. Following this victory, Communist Party organs moved once again to the county center. Later in June, the Communist Party declared the establishment of the Yanshui County Soviet Government (Chinese: 延水县苏维埃政府) and the Yanchuan County Soviet Government (Chinese: 延川县苏维埃政府), parts of the Chinese Soviet Republic.

With firm control established in the counties, the Red Army used the area as a springboard to expand into other nearby regions. On September 2, 1935, Red Army troops launched from Wen'anyi went to attack Hengshan County (currently known as Hengshan District). In mid-September, numerous military divisions exiled from Southern China as part of the Long March arrived in the area, marking the end of their journey.

Communist forces in the area began their civil reforms during the latter half of 1935, including constructing a textile factory, establishing a hospital, and prosecuting former landlords in trials. The issue of land reforms was of particular importance, and the regional Communist government sent officials to Yanchuan and Yanshui Counties to investigate the process of land reforms there.

At the end of 1935, Communist leader Zhou Enlai organized a meeting of four nearby county governments in Yanchuan to prepare for the Eastern Expedition, a failed military campaign against the Nationalist Army. Red Army forces partaking the Eastern Expedition, led by Mao Zedong, passed through Yanchuan County in January and February 1936. County officials launched a large-scale operation involving well over 1,000 people to help the troops cross the Yellow River, which forms the county's eastern border. Beginning in late March, forces led by Zhou Enlai retreated, passing through Yanchuan County again. Troops led by Mao Zedong followed, passing through the county from May 1 to May 3.

Following the failure of the Eastern Expedition, Mao began discussing the possibility of presenting an anti-Japanese united front, penning a treatise on the topic in Yangjiagetai on May 5, and began organizing an anti-Japanese "headquarters" in the village of Taixiangsi (Chinese: 太相寺村) in present-day Guanzhuang on May 10. From May 14 to May 18, Mao, Zhou, and Peng Dehuai began organizing Red Army troops for a western expedition into Gansu and Ningxia. The troops launched from Taixiangsi and Jiajiaping Village (Chinese: 贾家坪村) in Yanchuan County on the 19th. However, less than a month later, Mao and the Zhou had to return, facing a Nationalist attack from Wayaobu, to the northwest of the county. A number of Communist organs in Wayaobu were moved to Yanchuan County. In June, Yanchuan itself faced heavy attacks from Nationalist forces, and were forced to abolish the Yanchuan County government and revert to guerilla warfare. By July, Nationalist troops occupied the county center, and in August, they launched an attack on Yongping. On September 19, a battle took place in Liumajiageta Village (Chinese: 刘马家圪塔村). The Communist Party re-established the county government in December. In April 1937, the Kuomintang and the Communist Party agreed that, for the purpose of opposing the Japanese invasion, the Kuomintang would also be allowed to established a county government in Yanchuan. A large public rally against the Japanese took place in the county on September 18, 1937.

In September 1937, Yanshui County was merged into Yanchuan County, giving the new Yanchuan County jurisdiction over 7 districts and 53 townships, with a total population of 64,797.

By October 1937, the Japanese army successfully invaded much of neighboring Shanxi, and began attempts at invading the Shaan-Gan-Ning Border Region. From October through December, the Communist government of the county launched a large series of operations targeting bandits in possession of military-grade weapons.

In December 1937, a 40 kilometres (25 mi) road connecting the village of Wangjiatun (Chinese: 王家屯村) in Yanchuan to the town of Yaodian in Yan'an's urban center (present-day Baota District) was completed. This road was the first in Yanchuan meant for usage by automobiles.

In April 1938, some of the Red Army's security forces in the county were merged into the Eighth Route Army. The following month, county security forces arrested two people in the county who were allegedly spying for the Japanese army through a local Gelaohui organization. In July, two districts in the county were harassed by bandits, causing localized famine. Following this, various groups throughout the county, including guerilla fighters and security officers, collaborated to arrest 39 of the bandits supposedly responsible for the episode.

While various organizations and members of the public had been donating food and equipment to United Front forces from 1937 onwards, the county had yet to see any military conflict with the Japanese army. However, in April 1939, Japanese forces in neighboring Shanxi approached the Yellow River, the border between Yanchuan County and the neighboring province. In response, the county mobilized more than 2,500 workers to build defenses bordering the river. In September, Kuomintang forces stationed to the north of the county passed south, through Yanchuan. Locals erected three donation stations throughout the county, and supplied the passing troops with grain, salt, firewood, and other goods. The same month, the county was afflicted by flooding. In March 1940, Japanese troops attacked Yanchang County, directly to Yanchuan's south, but were repelled by local forces.

Local cooperation between the Communist Party and the Kuomintang ended in April 1940, and Kuomintang officials were expelled to Yichuan County. On May 20, 5 Japanese bomber planes performed 3 bombing raids on Yanchuan County, dropping a total of 23 bombs. This proved to be the first and last battle in Yanchuan County involving the Japanese. More of the county's security forces were incorporated into the Eighth Route Army in September. In October, Zhu De and Wang Zhen arrived in the county to inspect troops, and rally the public. More river defenses were erected in November and December.

In Spring of 1941, the county established a public health organization, which had a second branch in Yongping. A textile factory was built in late June, a girl's primary school was opened in August, and a government committee to improve salt transportation was established in December. 1941 was the first year compulsory education was introduced in the county, resulting in more than 4,000 students attending school in the county by the end of the year.

On May 10, 1942, the county government established an armed forces committee. The county government established a treasury in September 1942.

In the latter half May 1942, the county government established a rectification study committee (Chinese: 整风学习委员会; pinyin: zhěngfēng xuéxí wěiyuánhuì) as part of the wider Yan'an Rectification Movement. The county's rectification study committee received praise personally from Mao Zedong in late 1943.

The county built two textile factories in 1944.

With the surrender of Japan in September 1945, Yanchuan County sent a number of relief workers, including medical workers, to neighboring Yonghe County in Shanxi.

With the resumption of the Chinese Civil War following the defeat of Japan, a number of prominent Communist Party figures visited Yanchuan County, and fighting resumed in the area. In early December 1946, Hu Jingduo, a Nationalist general who defected with his troops and joined the Communists, passed through Yanchuan County after rebelling in Hengshan County. In early March 1947, Xie Juezai and Xu Teli spent time in Yanchuan County en route to Qingjian County. Communist forces led by Wang Zhen were briefly stationed in Yanchuan County later in March to try to prevent Nationalist forces led by Hu Zongnan from invading Yan'an's urban core. On the morning of March 19, Mao Zedong and Zhou Enlai hid in the village of Liujiaqu (Chinese: 刘家渠村) in Yanchuan County as part of their escape from advanced Nationalist forces which now occupied Yan'an's center. That afternoon, two Nationalist planes fired upon the village, but Mao and Zhou successfully shielded themselves from the fire by hiding in a nearby valley. Nationalist troops, led by Hu Zongnan, successfully captured Yanchuan County's center at 2 pm on March 29, forcing the Communist Party government to flee. The Communist military, reorganized as the People's Liberation Army (PLA), engaged in a sizable battle Nationalist troops in Yongping on April 6, where they inflicted fatalities on 600 Nationalist soldiers, and captured 900. However, later in the month, Communist forces were relegated to fighting a guerrilla war in the county. In May, PLA guerrillas ambushed a small team of Nationalist soldiers in the village of Zhangjiawan (Chinese: 张家湾村). PLA guerrillas also successfully ambushed a small unit of Nationalist fighters in the village of Majiayuan (Chinese: 马家原村) the following month. Similar raids took place throughout the county from July through September, before the PLA retook the county on October 1.

Upon their re-establishment of control, the Communist Party punished soldiers they viewed as not having fought adequately, as well as those they believed to be spies. They also launched an investigation into potential atrocities committed by Hu Zongnan's army, concluding that his army killed 57 civilians, thousands of heads of livestock, burned nearly 800 houses, destroyed nearly 3,000 doors and windows, and raped over 1,000 women. They also resumed civil activities, such as continuing land reforms and organizing peasant associations. However, county remained largely devastated by the conflict, with food insecurity afflicting over 10,000 people in the county in January 1948. Furthermore, military activities continued nearby, with Peng Dehuai leading PLA armies through the county in late January to go to the front lines just south of the county, and again in February. That spring, epidemics of dysentary, malaria, and typhoid afflicted the county. About 790 children died from illnesses in the county that spring.

In February 1949, Yanchuan County's Communist government reorganized into six districts: Yanshui District (Chinese: 延水区), Yongyuan District (Chinese: 永远区), Chengshi District (Chinese: 城市区), Yongsheng District (Chinese: 永胜区), Yuju District (Chinese: 禹居区), and Yongping District (Chinese: 永平区).

=== People's Republic of China ===
In May 1950, Yanchuan County was placed under the jurisdiction of Suide District (simplified Chinese: 绥德分区; traditional Chinese: 綏德分區). The county itself also underwent a number of internal reorganizations, with its six districts being renamed to simply be ordinal numbers, and the number of townships they governed was reduced from 39 to 30. The decision to renamed the six districts, however, was quickly undone later in 1950.

In July 1950, a county health center was established. Departments for personnel and transportation were established in January 1951. A ban on smoking was implemented on June 16, 1951.

Beginning on April 6, 1951, the county began organizing efforts to aid Chinese troops fighting in the Korean War.

In late October 1952, an epidemic of measles hit Yanchuan County. infecting 1,136 people, and killing 105.

Two village agricultural cooperatives were established in December 1952, and the following spring, a number of mutual aid groups were established throughout the county.

Five different hailstorms hit the county from May 18 to June 4, 1953.

The 1953 Chinese census took place in Yanchuan County on June 30, counting 58,866 people.

Phone lines connected Yanchuan County to Yan'an's center in October 1953.

The county was hit by a flood on September 3, 1954, affecting three of the county's six districts, and killing two people. From September 24 to 28, the county was hit by four hailstorms.The county was afflicted by drought throughout the spring and summer of the following year, and on October 1, 1955, the county began rationing food and oil.

Construction began on Yongping Bridge (Chinese: 永平大桥), a new bridge, in February 1956. The bridge was completed and opened to traffic in October later that year.

On March 1, 1956, the county reorganized its internal divisions, resulting in 4 districts and 3 townships subordinate to the county government, and 22 townships subordinate to the county's four districts.

On September 30, 1956, the county was moved to the jurisdiction of Yan'an Prefecture (simplified Chinese: 延安专区; traditional Chinese: 延安專區).

In December 1956, the county declared the "completion" of the transition of its agriculture to a socialist system, with 95.22% of the county's rural households belonging to agricultural cooperatives.

Chengguan Kindergarten (Chinese: 城关幼儿园; pinyin: Chéngguān Yòu'éryuán), the county's first public kindergarten was opened in March 1957.

In November 1957, construction workers repairing a road in the county accidentally created a landslide which killed four people and injured one more.

The county's political rectification and "anti-rightist" campaigns seriously intensified throughout 1957 and 1958, resulting in 907 people being criticized, 205 people faced formal punishment, and 97 people were arrested.

On March 26, 1958, a broadcasting station and a weather station were both established in the county. A power plant was built in the county in June 1958.

On August 28, 1958, the county underwent another round of administrative reorganizing, changing its system of districts and townships to one simply comprising 12 townships. Yet another round took place merely a few days later, with the 12 townships being replaced by 7 people's communes. Finally, Yanchuan County itself was abolished and merged into Yanchang County on December 24, 1958.

Yongping was hit by a riot on the evening of June 20, 1960, where banks and warehouses were looted, an oil well was burnt, government offices were trashed, various Communist Party and government officials were killed. Government authorities blamed the riots on a rebel group who tried to overthrow the local government, and arrested the riot's alleged mastermind on July 9.

Yanchuan County was re-established on September 1, 1961.

Agricultural production was severely harmed by a series of natural disasters in 1961, including drought, frost, floods, hail, and windstorms.

On October 30, 1962, the county government declared that its urban core was too populated, and moved 653 people to rural areas.

Beginning in March 1963, Yanchuan County's government began implementing a number of political education policies, such as the Socialist Education Movement, the Five-anti Campaign, and the Learn from Comrade Lei Feng campaign.

Drought afflicted Yanchuan County in the spring of 1963.

On July 1, 1964, the county conducted the 1964 Chinese census, counting 85,048 people.

Heavy rainfall led to flooding on July 5, 1964, destroying an oil well in Yongping, and the Guaimao Bridge (Chinese: 拐峁大桥).

On April 2, 1965, the Yanchuan County government introduced agricultural reforms inspired by the Learn from Dazhai in agriculture movement.

In 1965, a family planning committee was established in the county.

On May 14, 1966, the county government established an office to implement the Cultural Revolution. Later in the month, 1,000 people partook in a rally to condemn the Three Family Village. Beginning in June, organizations were set up in the county's schools to train teachers in the policies of the Cultural Revolution. Dazibao were posted throughout the county beginning in July. During the following months, 70 school faculty were criticized, some of whom were fired, or sent to perform labor. In January 1937, the Red Guards, a Maoist paramilitary organization, began organizing in Yanchuan County. By early March, the Red Guards gained enough strength in the county to effectively paralyze the existing county government, preventing it from carrying out much of its functions. The Red Guards carried out a campaign of vandalizing and destroying a number of Confucian temples throughout the county in August 1937.

In the wake of this power struggle between the county government, and the Red Guards, a number of new groups emerged, and began fighting each other. While performing a play at a high school auditorium in the county on November 3, 1937, two groups, the Hongzongsi (Chinese: 红总司) and the Hongsiye (Chinese: 红四野) began quarreling. The following day, members of the Hongsiye organized between 500 and 600 peasants to march on the county's center, and attack members of the Hongzongsi. Later in November, a separate group known as the Yanzongsi (Chinese: 延总司) began robbing weapons in Yongping, seizing 13 rifles with 160 rounds of ammunition. The Hongsiye, with aid from another group, stole four machine guns from an army garrison in the county on December 4. At 5:30 am on March 14, 1968, the Yanzongsi teamed up with oil workers in the county, as well as militants from nearby Qingjian County to seize the center of Yanchuan County, killing three members of the Hongsiye, and injuring one more. On April 17, Hongsiye and Yanzongsi fought again in the village of Baijiayuan (Chinese: 白家塬村), resulting in the deaths and injuries of eight people. On May 17, the Hongsiye tried seizing Yongping, but were met with resistance by the Honggongzong (Chinese: 红工总), a paramilitary group set up by oil workers in the town, who repelled them and killed four of the Hongsiye's members. However, armed conflict in the county was ended in July 1968, following the July Third Notice and the July Twenty-fourth Notice, notices issued by the Central Committee of the Chinese Communist Party meant to stop conflicts nationwide.

In 1968, a new iteration of Yan'an Prefecture was created.

During the Cultural Revolution, a number of young people associated with the urban bourgeois elites of the Communist Party were sent to Yanchuan County and other rural regions as part of the Down to the Countryside Movement. On January 23, the first batch of youths, a group from Beijing comprising more than 1,300 people, arrived in Yanchuan County. Sometime in 1969, current General Secretary of the Chinese Communist Party Xi Jinping was sent to Yanchuan County as part of the movement, where he performed manual labor for seven years. Xi helped construct the first marsh gas reservoir in the county in April 1974.

In October 1969, the Guaimao Bridge (Chinese: 拐峁大桥) was rebuilt and opened to traffic.

By the end of 1969, all villages in the county were covered by broadcasting signals.

Construction began on a cement plant in the county in January 1970, which opened in January 1971.

An epidemic prevention station was opened in Yanchuan County on December 17, 1971.

In 1972, the county embarked on a number of major construction projects. Construction on the Hanshashi Reservoir (Chinese: 寒砂石水库) began in September 1972, and was completed in October 1973. Work at the Hongwei Coal Mine (Chinese: 红卫煤矿) also began in 1972. By the end of 1972, all 32 kilometres (20 mi) of the Xibao Highway (Chinese: 西包公路), which connected Xi'an with Baotou, that passed through Yanchuan County was paved with asphalt.

In December 1972, the county government abolished all bureaus, committees, and other organizations devoted to implementing the Cultural Revolution.

Torrential downpours hit the county on July 7 and July 8, 1973, flooding reservoirs and dams, destroying crops, and killing seven people.

On February 1, 1974, construction began on paving the Yongping-Yanchuan Highway (Chinese: 永平—延川公路) with asphalt. By September 23, all 42 kilometres (26 mi) were paved.

Construction began on a county theater in April 1974, and it was completed in October of the following year.

While digging a canal in the county on December 30, 1974, workers accidentally dislodged the top of a mountain in Yuju, triggering a landslide which killed 12.

The first television set arrived in the county in March 1975.

A waterworks was built in the county on March 21, 1975.

The county's first television station, Majiayashan (Chinese: 马家崖山), was inaugurated on September 15, 1976.

An FM broadcasting station was built in Yanchuan County on December 23, 1977.

At 6 pm on April 1, 1978, a truck fell off a road in Yanshuiguan Village (Chinese: 延水关村), in the people's commune of Yanshuiguan. The truck fell into a deep valley, killing 12 and injuring 2 more.

An electricity bureau was established for the county in April 1978.

In late May 1978, the county government formally rehabilitated 15 people in the county who were denounced as rightists in 1957. On May 15, 1979, the county govern rehabilitated 138 households of landlords and wealthy peasants.

The county's first department store opened in October 1978.

From June through October 1979, 7 hailstorms hit the county, severely damaging the county's crops.

On July 1, 1979, the Heilongguan Bridge (Chinese: 黑龙关大桥) was completed and opened to traffic. Construction began on another bridge, the Yanchuan Bridge (Chinese: 延川大桥), on October 1, 1979, and the bridge was completed on November 28, 1980.

The Yanchuan County Traditional Medicine Hospital (Chinese: 延川县中医院), the county's first formal clinic dealing in Traditional Chinese medicine, was opened on May 10, 1980.

In December 1980, the county government began reverting the system of people's communes back to towns.

Color television broadcasting began in Yanchuan County on May 1, 1981.

Heavy rails afflicted the county on July 7, 1981, where 50 millimetres (2.0 in) fell in just 15 minutes, flooding fields and destroying crops.

In December 1981, police captured, arrested, and executed a serial killer named Li Tailiang (Chinese: 李太亮), who they believed to be responsible for four homicides.

The county completed the 1982 Chinese census on July 1, 1982, recording a population of 124,741 people.

Kim Il Sung was invited to a dinner in Shaanxi in September 1982, where he took a liking to jujubes grown in Yanchuan County, and formally requested a batch of jujube seeds be sent to North Korea. In March 1983, the Chinese government selected a batch of 300 seedlings from Zhuangtou Village (Chinese: 庄头村) in the county to send to North Korea.

A small typhoid epidemic hit the village of Suyahe (Chinese: 苏亚河村) in the county during later December 1982. The epidemic infected 65 people from 48 different households, ultimately killing 1 person.

A building at Yongping's oil drilling site collapsed in October 1983, killing 13 people and injuring many others.

In August and September 1984, Yanchuan County converted the remaining five people's communes in the county to towns and townships.

A wharf in Yanshuiguan was completed and opened in October 1984.

From August 28 to September 17, 1985, heavy rains afflicted the county, resulting the destruction of 505 yaodong, killing one and injuring three others. That same year, various types of rodents were found in unusual numbers throughout the county, damaging approximately 400,000 mu of cropland. A hailstorm struck the county at 1:30 pm on June 11, 1986, damaging crops and killing one person.

On December 12, 1986, the county government declared recent elections in the town of Yanchuan (Chinese: 延川镇), Heilongguan Township (Chinese: 黑龙关乡), and Fengjiaping Township to be invalid, and instructed the three areas to re-conduct elections.

From April through August 1987, a series of hailstorms and floods hit Yanchuan County, destroying large amounts of crops.

On January 26, 1988, Chinese journalist Wan Wuyi published a report showing that Yanchuan County officials had falsified statistics on the county's income levels in a 1985 report. Three days later, the county admitted that they had lied in the report, and the Yan'an prefectural government issued new income figures on February 3.

Throughout 1989, Yanchuan County was hit by severe rain, destroying 42 houses and killing 4 people.

The county conducted the 1990 Chinese census on July 1, 1990, recording a population of 148,437 people.

The torch for the 1990 Asian Games passed through Yanchuan County on September 10, 1990.

The county's oil industry greatly boomed in 1990, with 38 wells being drilled that year, producing 3,759 tons of crude petroleum. By 1995, annual production surpassed 20,000 tons.

To commemorate Lu Yao's novel Ordinary World winning the Mao Dun Literature Prize in 1991, Lu Yao was invited to a ceremony held by the county government on September 26, 1991, where he led a talk on literature.

In 1992, the county received a loan from the World Bank totaling 720,000 United States dollars. In November 1995, the county received another World Bank loan for a project to improve child healthcare.

A minor earthquake afflicted the county at 11:35 am on May 3, 1996.

Yan'an Prefecture was upgraded to the prefecture-level city of Yan'an in 1996.

==== 21st century ====
During the 21st century, Yanchuan County's internal borders were reorganized on three separate occasions: in 2001, in 2011, and in 2015.

In 2001, Heilongguan Township was merged into the town of Yanchuan, Shaodaohe Township (Chinese: 稍道河乡) was merged into Yangjiagetai, and Nanhe Township (Chinese: 南河乡) was merged into Majiahe Township.

In 2011, Fengjiaping Township and Gaojiatun Township were merged into the town of Yongping, and both Hejiawan Township and Yanchasi Township were merged into the town of Yanchuan.

In 2015, the county again underwent its most recent internal reorganization: the town of Yanchuan was reorganized as Dayu Subdistrict; the town of Yuju was merged into the town of Wen'anyi; Majiahe Township was split between Wen'anyi, Yangjiagetai, Yanshuiguan, and Dayu Subdistrict; Tugang Township (Chinese: 土岗乡) was reorganized as Qiankunwan; portions of Yangjiagetai were transferred to Qiankunwan.

Following the ascent of Xi Jinping to the General Secretary of the Chinese Communist Party, the most powerful position in China, Liangjiahe Village in Wen'anyi, where Xi lived and worked for seven years, became a prominent red tourism site, attracting thousands of visitors daily. Yanchuan County has seen a large boom to tourism because of this, hosting 3.05 million tourists who spent over 2 billion Yuan in 2017 alone.

On August 21, 2023, an explosion in a coal mine in the town of Yongping killed 11 people.

== Geography ==
Yanchuan County is located in Northern Shaanxi, approximately 80 kilometres (50 mi) northeast of Yan'an's urban area. Located in the central Loess Plateau, the terrain is largely hilly, which is characteristic of the broader region. Elevation in Yanchuan County ranges from 493 metres (1,617 ft) to 1,367 metres (4,485 ft) above sea level. Yanchuan County's hills and mountains are relatively steep, with 48.25% of its territorial slope having an incline of more than 15°, and 11.46% having an incline of more than 25°. The Yellow River runs through the east of the county, and the Qingjian River also runs through the county. Much of the county is grassland.

=== Climate ===
The county has an annual average temperature is 13.8 °C (56.8 °F), an average of 1,878 sunshine hours per year, and received approximately 1,222.5 millimetres (48.13 in) of rain per year.

Climate data for Yanchuan, elevation 805 m (2,641 ft), (1991–2020 normals, extremes 1951–present)
Month	Jan	Feb	Mar	Apr	May	Jun	Jul	Aug	Sep	Oct	Nov	Dec	Year
Record high °C (°F)	17.1 (62.8)	21.3 (70.3)	30.0 (86.0)	36.9 (98.4)	37.8 (100.0)	41.5 (106.7)	40.1 (104.2)	37.9 (100.2)	38.3 (100.9)	31.2 (88.2)	26.5 (79.7)	19.9 (67.8)	41.5 (106.7)
Mean daily maximum °C (°F)	5.1 (41.2)	6.4 (43.5)	10.4 (50.7)	16.8 (62.2)	22.6 (72.7)	27.8 (82.0)	30.7 (87.3)	29.7 (85.5)	25.6 (78.1)	19.4 (66.9)	13.3 (55.9)	7.9 (46.2)	18.0 (64.4)
Daily mean °C (°F)	1.3 (34.3)	2.4 (36.3)	6.2 (43.2)	12.0 (53.6)	17.6 (63.7)	23.0 (73.4)	26.2 (79.2)	25.4 (77.7)	21.6 (70.9)	15.3 (59.5)	9.5 (49.1)	4.4 (39.9)	13.8 (56.8)
Mean daily minimum °C (°F)	−1.9 (28.6)	−1.2 (29.8)	2.3 (36.1)	7.8 (46.0)	13.2 (55.8)	18.7 (65.7)	22.2 (72.0)	21.7 (71.1)	18.0 (64.4)	11.8 (53.2)	6.2 (43.2)	1.5 (34.7)	10.1 (50.2)
Record low °C (°F)	−20.2 (−4.4)	−18.3 (−0.9)	−14.4 (6.1)	−5.8 (21.6)	1.0 (33.8)	7.6 (45.7)	12.8 (55.0)	11.6 (52.9)	3.3 (37.9)	−2.7 (27.1)	−15.3 (4.5)	−18.4 (−1.1)	−20.2 (−4.4)
Average precipitation mm (inches)	77.5 (3.05)	69.4 (2.73)	101.8 (4.01)	90.7 (3.57)	97.9 (3.85)	192.2 (7.57)	149.2 (5.87)	156.0 (6.14)	98.5 (3.88)	70.7 (2.78)	63.0 (2.48)	50.6 (1.99)	1,217.5 (47.92)
Average precipitation days (≥ 0.1 mm)	10.3	10.2	11.4	10.8	11.6	13.9	11.0	11.8	8.6	7.5	8.8	7.8	123.7
Average snowy days	4.9	4.0	1.7	0.3	0	0	0	0	0	0.1	1.9	4.1	17
Average relative humidity (%)	73	71	69	68	69	77	71	73	76	73	71	70	72
Mean monthly sunshine hours	116.5	119.7	140.9	167.1	177.2	132.8	209.9	210.4	170.5	165.7	135.5	132.3	1,878.5
Percentage possible sunshine	36	38	38	43	42	31	49	52	46	47	43	42	42
Source: China Meteorological Administration

== Administrative divisions ==
Yanchuan County is made up of one subdistrict and seven towns, which are further divided into 4 residential communities and 346 administrative villages.

=== Subdistricts ===
The county's sole subdistrict is Dayu Subdistrict (大禹街道; Dàyǔ Jiēdào). The subdistrict houses the county's administrative offices.

=== Towns ===
The county's seven towns are as follows:

- Yongping (永坪镇; Yǒngpíng Zhèn)
- Yanshuiguan (延水关镇; Yánshuǐguān Zhèn)
- Wen'anyi (文安驿镇; Wén'ānyì Zhèn)
- Yangjiagetai (杨家圪台镇; Yángjiāgētái Zhèn)
- Jiajiaping (贾家坪镇; Jiǎjiāpíng Zhèn)
- Guanzhuang (关庄镇; Guānzhuāng Zhèn)
- Qiankunwan (乾坤湾镇; Qiánkūnwān Zhèn)

== Demographics ==
Historical population
Year	Pop.	±% p.a.
1953	58,866	—
1964	85,048	+3.40%
1982	124,741	+2.15%
1990	148,437	+2.20%
1996	164,465	+1.72%
2000	164,902	+0.07%
2010	168,375	+0.21%
2019	170,100	+0.11%

The Shaanxi Provincial Bureau of Statistics estimated Yanchuan County's permanent population to be approximately 170,100, as of 2019. This is a slight increase from the 168,375 people recorded in the 2010 Chinese census, and an estimated 168,500 people in 2011.

=== Historical population ===
In the 2000 Chinese census, Yanchuan County's recorded population stood at 164,902, and a 1996 estimate put the county's population at 164,465. The 1990 Chinese census recorded 148,437 people. The 1982 Chinese census reported 124,741 people. The 1964 Chinese census counted 85,048 people. The 1953 Chinese census recorded 58,866 people.

== Economy ==
The county had a total GDP of 8.065 billion Yuan as of 2017, a 10.6% increase from the previous year. The per capita disposable income of the county's urban population was 30,598 Yuan, and was 10,015 for the county's rural population.

=== Mineral resources ===
The county has oil reserves totaling 2.12 million tons, coal reserves totaling 30 million tons, and salt reserves of 15.3 billion tons. In 2017, Yanchuan County produced 55,600 tons of crude oil, 350,000,000 cubic metres (1.2×10^{10} ft^{3}) of natural gas, 400,000 tons of raw coal, 3.03 million tons of processed crude oil, and 188,600 tons of liquefied natural gas.

=== Agriculture ===
As of 2011, agricultural work is the most common occupation in Yanchuan County, with about 80% of its working population engaged in agricultural production. Major agricultural products in Yanchuan County include jujubes, apples, and peaches.

Beginning in 1999, China's government implemented the Grain for Green program, a program meant to reduce soil erosion caused by cropland situated on steep slopes by compensating farmers with grain to convert such farmland to grasslands or forests. From 1999 to 2011, the program resulted in a near 48% decrease in the county's cropland, and an increase on over 250% in land used for orchards.

=== Tourism ===
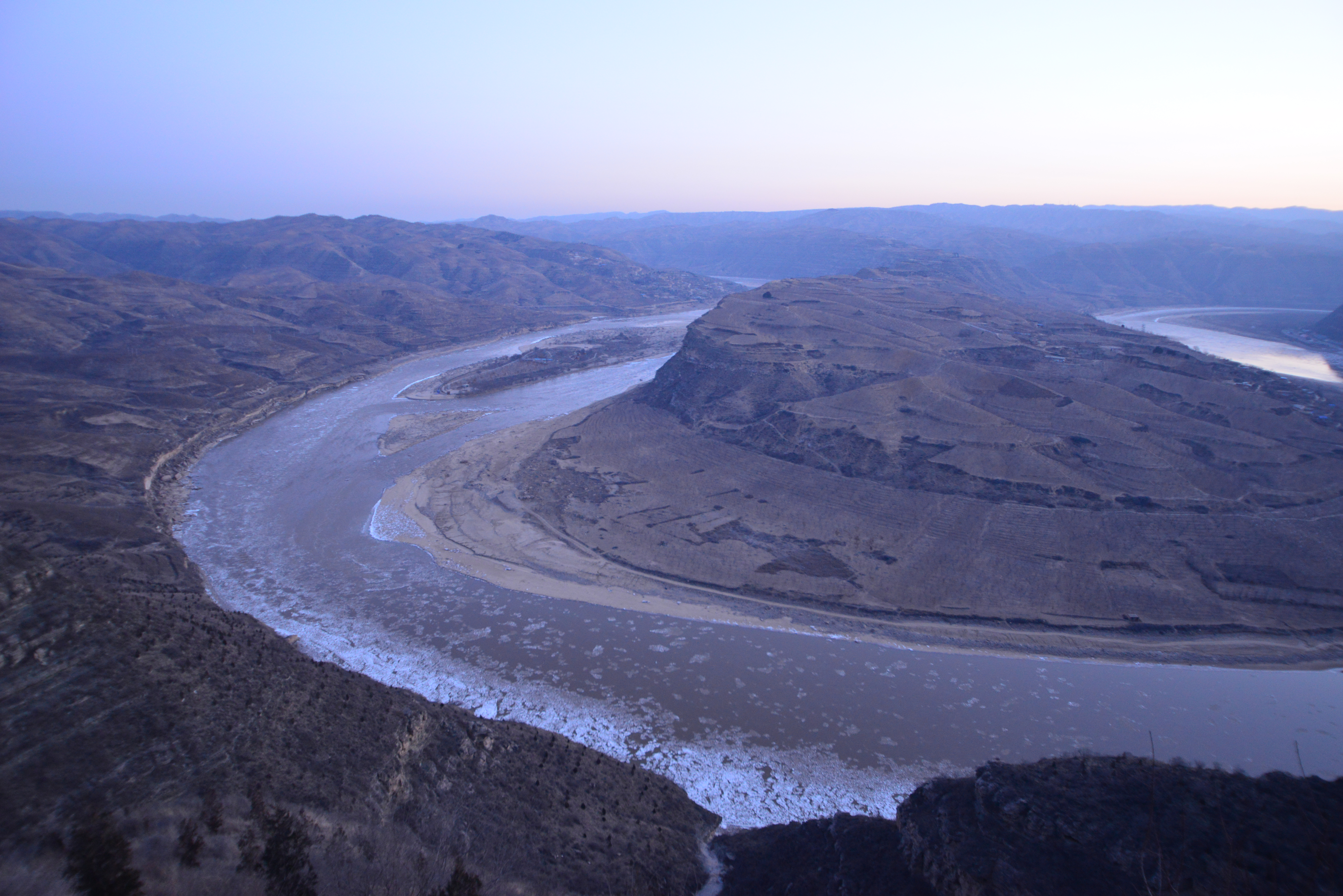
The Yellow River at Qiankunwan Scenic Area

The county attracts many tourists due to the presence of natural, historic, and red tourism sites within the county. In 2017, 3.05 million tourists visited the county, spending over 2 billion Yuan. Major sites include the Qiankunwan Scenic Area, the former home of writer Lu Yao, the Red Army Eastern Expedition Memorial Hall, and the village of Liangjiahe.

==== Xi Jinping-related tourism ====
As part of Mao Zedong's Down to the Countryside Movement, a young Xi Jinping was sent to Liangjiahe, a small village in the county. The Chinese Communist Party has now begun to develop it as a destination for domestic tourism, to promote Xi's image. According to official accounts, he was made to do intense manual labor, and live in a yaodong, a type of cave dwelling common throughout the region. Xi also began his life of public service helping the locals in Liangjiahe, once allegedly carrying over 200 lbs of wheat for over 15 miles. According to Chinese media sources, thousands are brought to the village everyday to learn about Xi Jinping's life during this time.

== Transportation ==
Yanchuan County is served by China National Highway 210, Shaanxi Provincial Highway 201, and Shaanxi Provincial Highway 205.
