= Wen'anyi =

Wen'anyi 文安驿镇
- Town
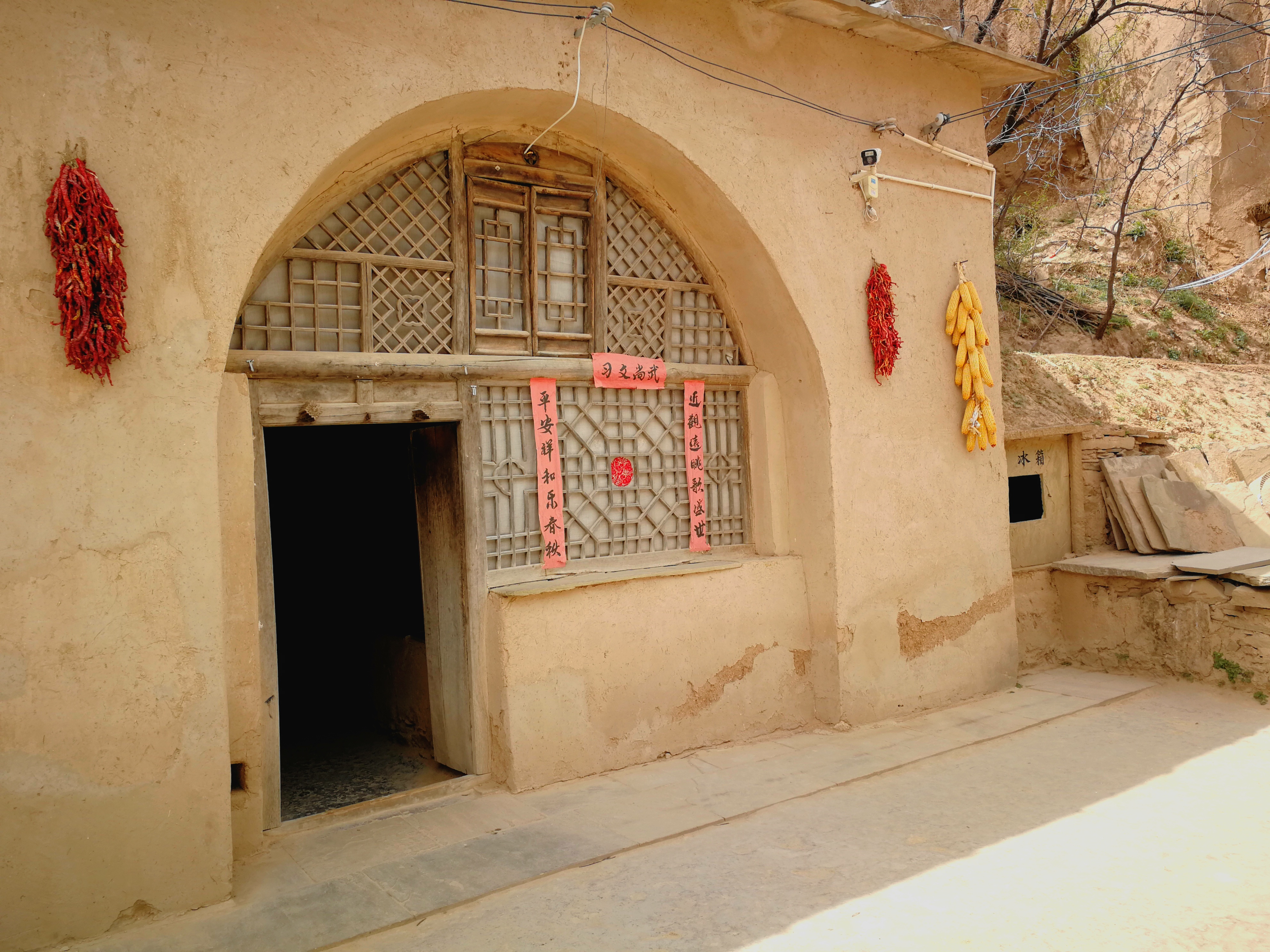
- A yaodong in Liangjiahe Village

- Location within China
- Coordinates: 36°51′57″N 110°03′19″E
- Country: China
- Province: Shaanxi
- Prefecture-level city: Yan'an
- County: Yanchuan County

Area
  - Total: 325.72 km^{2} (125.76 sq mi)

Population (2018)
  - Total: 22,098
  - Density: 67.844/km^{2} (175.71/sq mi)

Wen'anyi (simplified Chinese: 文安驿镇; traditional Chinese: 文安驛鎮; pinyin: Wén'ānyì Zhèn) is a town in Yanchuan County, Yan'an, Shaanxi, China. The town is located in central Yanchuan County, 15 kilometres (9.3 mi) from the county center of Dayu Subdistrict. The town spans an area of 325.72 square kilometres (125.76 sq mi), and has a hukou population of 22,098 as of 2018.

== History ==
In 1958, Wen'anyi was established as a people's commune. Xi Jinping was sent to Liangjiahe Village in Wen'anyi in early 1969 as part of Mao Zedong's Down to the Countryside Movement. Xi stayed in the village for seven years, performing manual labor and ascending the local political ranks. In May 1984, Wen'anyi was changed to a township, and in August, it was upgraded to a town. In 2015, the former town of Yujun was merged into Wen'anyi.

== Administrative divisions ==
Wen'anyi administers 2 residential communities and 23 administrative villages.

=== Residential Communities ===
Wen'anyi contains the following 2 residential communities:

- Wenzhou Community (Chinese: 文州社区)
- Wen'an Community (Chinese: 文安社区)

=== Villages ===
Wen'anyi contains the following 23 administrative villages:

- Shangyi Village (Chinese: 上驿村)
- Xiayi Village (Chinese: 下驿村)
- Majiagou Village (Chinese: 马家沟村)
- Yiluohe Village (Chinese: 依洛河村)
- Liangjiahe Village (Chinese: 梁家河村)
- Baijiayuan Village (Chinese: 白家塬村)
- Yujun Village (Chinese: 禹居村)
- Laozhuanghe Village (Chinese: 老庄河村)
- Tuojiacha Village (Chinese: 驮家岔村)
- Lüjiahe Village (Chinese: 吕家河村)
- Qiaojiahe Village (Chinese: 乔家河村)
- Kangjia Village (Chinese: 康家村)
- Fengjiawan Village (Chinese: 封家湾村)
- Gaojiaping Village (Chinese: 高家坪村)
- Zhangjiatun Village (Chinese: 张家屯村)
- Majiaping Village (Chinese: 马家坪村)
- Gaojiagetu Village (Chinese: 高家圪图村)
- Fanjiagou Village (Chinese: 樊家沟村)
- Haojiahe Village (Chinese: 郝家河村)
- Donggeta Village (Chinese: 东圪塔村)
- Hejiahe Village (Chinese: 贺家河村)
- Dumuyuan Village (Chinese: 杜木塬村)
- Poshihe Village (Chinese: 坡石河村)

== Demographics ==
Wen'anyi has a hukou population of 22,098 as of 2018.

Prior to the merger of Yujun into Wen'anyi, Wen'anyi's population per the 2010 Chinese Census was 4,178, down from the 5,474 recorded in the 2000 Chinese Census.

A 1996 population estimate put Wen'anyi's population at 7,000.

== Economy ==
Liangjiahe Village has become a major red tourism site, due to Xi Jinping's years living in the village. According to the People's Daily, about 2,500 people come to visit the village each year. A publication by the government of Yanchuan County reported that Wen'anyi spent 73 million renminbi in 2017 on infrastructure and beautification to further develop tourism.

== Transport ==
National Highway 210 runs through Wen'anyi.
