= I Am the Son of the Yellow Earth =

2002 essay by Xi Jinping

- Simplified Chinese: 我是黄土地的儿子
- Traditional Chinese: 我是黃土地的兒子
Transcriptions
Standard Mandarin
- Hanyu Pinyin: Wǒ shì huáng tǔdì de érzǐ

I Am the Son of the Yellow Earth is an autobiographical essay published by Xi Jinping in 2002, recalling his seven years as an sent-down youth in Liangjiahe, Yan'an, Shaanxi from 1968 to 1975 (when he was 15 to 22 years old).

== History ==
The full text of I am the Son of the Yellow Earth is about 5,000 words and was first published in the 12th issue of National New Book List magazine in 2002. At that time, Xi Jinping was the Party Secretary and Acting Governor of Zhejiang Province. Xi Jinping's father Xi Zhongxun died in May of that year. The full text was reprinted in the 9th issue of Western Development magazine in 2012.

== Overview ==
According to Xi Jinping's own account, in 1968 he was still a middle school student at the Beijing Bayi School. He had a conflict with the rebels and was sent to a "gangster" children's study class in a juvenile detention center. In December 1968, Mao Zedong called for people to go to the countryside and mountains, and Xi Jinping immediately signed up to go to Yan'an because he would be criticized every day in the city. When he arrived in northern Shaanxi, since few people in the countryside could read, he read newspapers every day to criticize Liu Shaoqi and Deng Xiaoping's agents in the northwest, "Peng, Gao, and Xi". Xi was his father Xi Zhongxun. When Xi Jinping first arrived in the countryside, he was very uncomfortable with the simple living conditions there. After a few months, he returned to Beijing and was arrested as a "returning population" and taken to the police station. He buried a sewer in the Haidian area. Xi Jinping then returned to Liangjiahe Village, Wenanyi Commune. There, he gradually adapted to local life, joined the Youth League and the Party, and was eventually recommended during the "rightist reversal of verdicts" period to become a worker-peasant-soldier student at Tsinghua University and returned to Beijing.

== Follow-up ==
On August 14, 2004, Xi Jinping accepted an interview with the Yan'an TV program "I am a Yan'an Person". During the interview, he said, "The Shaanxi-Northern Plateau gave me a belief, and it can be said that it determined the trajectory of my life. After going through this life lesson in Shaanxi-Northern Plateau, I was determined to do what I will do in the future. It taught me what to do."

== See also ==
- Xi Jinping Thought
