= Liangjiahe =

Liangjiahe 梁家河村
- Village
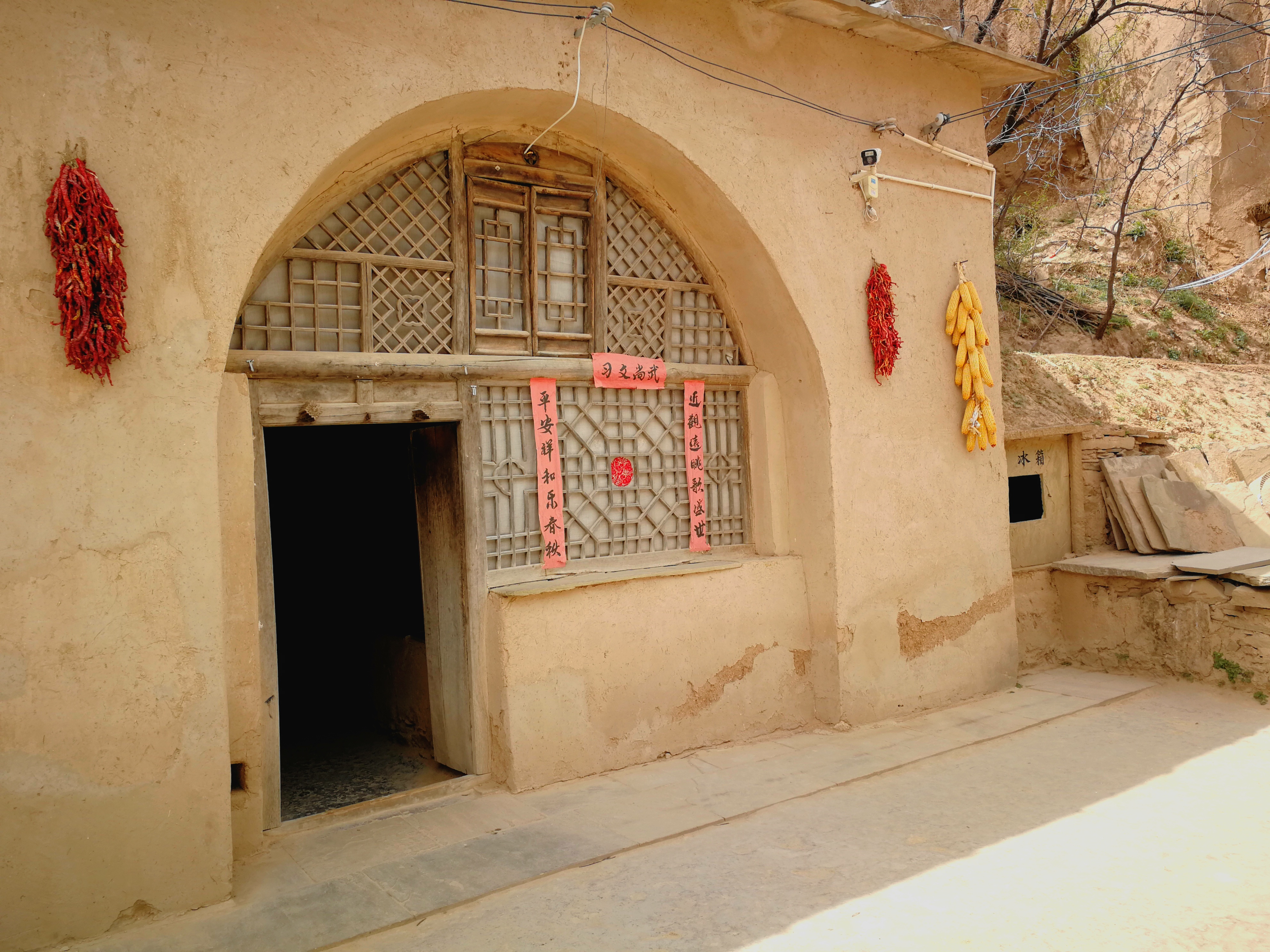
- A yaodong in Liangjiahe

- Location
- Coordinates: 36°29′37″N 110°20′06″E
- Country: People's Republic of China
- Province: Shaanxi
- Prefecture-level city: Yan'an
- County: Yanchuan
- Town: Wen'anyi
- Settled: Northern Song Dynasty
- Time zone: UTC+8 (China Standard Time)
- Area Code: 0911

Liangjiahe
- Traditional Chinese: 梁家河
- Simplified Chinese: 梁家河
Transcriptions
Standard Mandarin
- Hanyu Pinyin: Liángjiāhé

Liangjiahe is a village located in Wen'anyi Town, Yanchuan County, Yan'an City, Shaanxi Province, China. It is 5 kilometers southeast of Wenanyi Town. It was named after the Liang family who lived along the river in the Northern Song Dynasty. According to statistics in November 2015, after merging three villages, the village has 7 villager groups and 1,187 villagers. On 6 June 2019, Liangjiahe Village was included in the fifth batch of China's traditional villages by the Ministry of Housing and Urban-Rural Development. The village is known for being the place where Xi Jinping, General Secretary of the Chinese Communist Party, worked as an educated youth in the countryside during the Cultural Revolution.

== History ==
=== Relationship with Xi Jinping ===
The village is famous because Xi Jinping, General Secretary of the Chinese Communist Party since 2012, once visited the countryside in the village. Liangjiahe Village is well known for being the place where Xi worked as an educated youth in the countryside during the Cultural Revolution in the late 1960s and early 1970s and served as the Party branch secretary. In an interview in 2003, he said, “At that time, I carried 200 jin of wheat and walked ten miles on the mountain road without changing shoulders.” Because of his education, Xi Jinping later became the village Party branch secretary.

In 2007, when Xi Jinping was the Party Secretary of Shanghai, Li Xi was the Party Secretary of Yan'an. Hu Ping, Honorary Editor-in-Chief of Beijing Spring, said: "Li presided over the villagers of Liangjiahe to write letters to Xi Jinping, and Xi Jinping personally replied. Therefore, the whole Liangjiahe myth came from Li Xi. The flattery was just what Xi Jinping wanted." The villagers of Liangjiahe wrote to Xi Jinping four times in 2007, 2008, 2011 and 2014, and Xi Jinping replied every time. In 2008, Zhao Leji, then Party Secretary of Shaanxi, entrusted Li Xi to convey the greetings of Xi Jinping, then a Member of the CCP Central Secretariat, to Liangjiahe. Later, Zhao Leji and Li Xi were both promoted to the top leadership of the CCP. Both of them were members of the 20th CCP Politburo Standing Committee, ranking third and seventh in the party respectively.

After Xi Jinping became the General Secretary of the CCP Central Committee in 2012, the village was gradually developed into a tourist attraction and a party-building education base, and made certain progress in economic development indicators such as investment and business development, village appearance, per capita income, and transportation accessibility. In 2015, the village's per capita annual net income reached RMB 15,000, and it was identified as a national "one village, one product" demonstration village. The village's agricultural products of the same name are also available on the market.

When Xi Jinping, who had already become the CCP General Secretary, returned to Liangjiahe Village on February 13, 2015, he said: “Everything I learned in my first steps in life was in Liangjiahe. Don’t underestimate Liangjiahe, it is a place of great learning.” Therefore, "The Great Learning of Liangjiahe" has become a special term. In 2018, Shaanxi People's Publishing House published the documentary work "Liangjiahe" based on the experience of Xi Jinping and other educated youth participating in labor in Liangjiahe.

=== Liangjiahe Youth Educated Site and Red Tourism ===
In 2014, the "Liangjiahe Youth Educated Site" was designated as a cultural relic protection unit in Shaanxi Province by the Shaanxi Provincial Government, and a quotation plaque was erected in front of the memorial hall: "Shaanxi is the root, Yan'an is the soul, and Yanchuan is my second hometown. - Xi Jinping".

In May 2015, Liangjiahe Rural Cultural Tourism Development Co., Ltd. was officially established and began to operate red tourism. As of 2020, Liangjiahe Tourist Scenic Area has helped more than 100 poor households get out of poverty, created jobs for thousands of people, and increased the average income of poor households by more than 20,000 yuan per year. By the end of 2020, Liangjiahe Rural Cultural Tourism Development Co., Ltd. had provided 125 jobs, received 920,000 visitors per year, and promoted the development of 6 farmhouses, 23 small shops, and 3 farmhouse hotels, generating revenue of 13 million yuan.

In 2018, Wang Jianlin, a famous Chinese businessman, visited Liangjiahe to express his views.
