= Ordinary World (novel) =

1986 novel by Lu Yao

- Author: Lu Yao
- Original title: 平凡的世界
- Language: Chinese
- Genre: Drama
- Set in: China, 1975–1985
- Publication date: 1986–1988
- Publication place: China
- Media type: Print
- Awards: Third Mao Dun Literature Prize (1991)

Ordinary World (Chinese: 平凡的世界; pinyin: Píngfán de Shìjiè) is a novel by Chinese author Lu Yao. It consists of three volumes with a total of 1.1 million Chinese characters. In 1991, it was awarded the Third Mao Dun Literature Prize.

== Plot ==
=== Volume 1 ===
Written between 1982 and 1986, the narrative takes place between 1975 and 1978.

The story begins in the autumn of 1975, a year before the end of the Cultural Revolution, in Shaanxi province in China (the author's hometown). Shaoping Sun, an ordinary teenager from a village located on the Loess Plateau in northern Shaanxi, northwestern China, goes to the county of YuanXi to attend high school. His humble descent makes him shy and diffident. He falls in love with his classmate Hongmei Hao, a girl of upper-class descent. This is seen as problematic during the Cultural Revolution. Their relationship is revealed by their classmate Yuying Hou, and the abashed Hao has no choice but to end the liaison. She then quickly begins another relationship with her monitor, Yangmin Gu, a young man whose family is relatively better off than Sun's. After Sun's graduation from, he goes back home and becomes a teacher at the local village school and makes friends with Xiaoxia Tian, daughter of Fujun Tian, the vice president of the county's revolutionary committee.

Sun's elder brother, Shao'an, who has been working in the field after his graduation from primary school, falls in love with his childhood friend Runye Tian, daughter of Fujun's brother, Futang, who disdains this relationship. Shao'an's aunt arranges for him to meet Xiulian, the daughter of one of her very distant cousins. The two quickly start seeing each other and go back to Shao'an's native village to prepare for a wedding. Runye then obeys her father and marries Xiangqian Li.

=== Volume 2 ===
Written between 1982 and 1987, the narrative takes place between 1979 and 1981.

After the eleventh Chinese Communist Party (CPC) Central Committee Third Plenary Session in 1976, the CPC decides to end the Cultural Revolution established in 1966 and to modify various concepts associated with Maoism. The new governor of Shaanzi province proposes a new Household Contract Responsibility System, which contradicts the core of Maoism. Futang, a loyal Maoist, opposes the new system but fails; he is depressed by the great turning point of the nation. Shao'an then establishes a brick factory and becomes the wealthiest person in the village. Shaoping goes to a nearby city to find opportunity and finally becomes a miner in a mine. He begins seeing Xiaoxia, who becomes a journalist after her graduation from the local university. Runye's life after her marriage to Xiangqian is not happy. She bluntly rejects his advances. However, after he loses both his legs in a traffic accident, she finally warms up to him. Shaoping's younger sister, Lanxiang, manages to be enrolled in the astronomy program at the Northern University of Industry.

=== Volume 3 ===
Written between 1982 and 1988, the narrative takes place between 1981 and 1985.

Shaoping is promoted in the mine, but his girlfriend, Xiaoxia, dies while reporting a flood in the province. Shao'an's factory is ruined by a fake technician and he desperately finds himself in debt. However, with the assistance of his friends, he manages to re-establish the factory and becomes the most productive person in the whole region. However, Shaoping is later wounded and disfigured in an accident at the mine. During his recovery in the provincial capital, his sister's friend Xiu Jin expresses her feelings towards him. After careful consideration, Shaoping decides that he, a disfigured miner, should not marry Xiu, a university student who has great expectations in the future.

== Themes ==
The stories chronicled in the novel, which takes place between 1975 and 1985, reflect the drastic political and economic changes happening in China from the end of the Cultural Revolution to the early period of Reform and opening policies championed by then-Chinese leader Deng Xiaoping. The characters involved in the novel span a broad range of the socioeconomic spectrum. While the protagonists, the Suns, represent the changing life situation of common people in the underdeveloped countryside, the readers also get a personal glimpse of high-level decision-making processes and personal struggles of higher officials through the experience of Fujun, Futang's younger brother.
