= Lu Yao =

Chinese writer

- Born: Wang Weiguo; 3 December 1949; Qingjian County, Yulin, Shaanxi, China
- Died: 17 November 1992 (aged 42); Xi'an, Shaanxi, China
- Occupation: Writer
- Writing career
- Notable work: Ordinary World
- Notable awards: Mao Dun Literature Prize

Wang Weiguo (Chinese: 王卫国; 1949–1992), better known by his pen name Lu Yao (Chinese: 路遥), was a Chinese novelist.

== Biography ==
He was born on 3 December 1949 in Qingjian County, Shaanxi Province. He had six siblings and grew up in a very poor family.

== Career ==
He began writing novels when as a college student, and graduated from the Chinese Department of Yan'an University in 1973. After graduation, he became an editor of Yanhe magazine. In 1982, Lu Yao published his novella "Life", which was made into a film in 1984. It was at this time that he started to become well known across China. In 1991, Lu Yao finished his most famous work, Ordinary World, which won the Mao Dun Literature Prize. His writing was closely related to his own life and experiences, and focused mostly on young people from his native Shaanbei striving to change their lives.

== Death ==
He died on 17 November 1992.
