= Yaodong =

Form of earth shelter dwelling in northern China

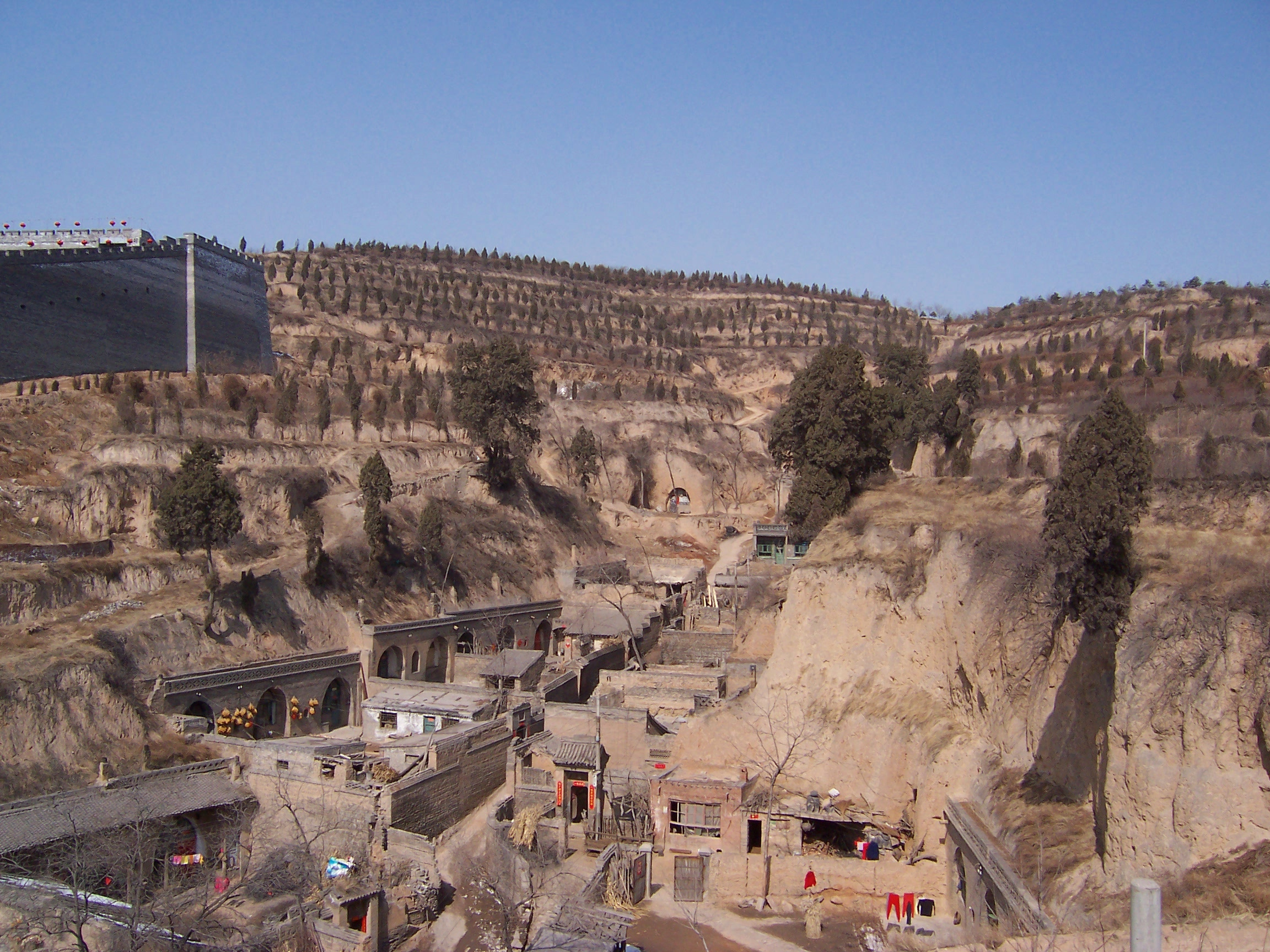
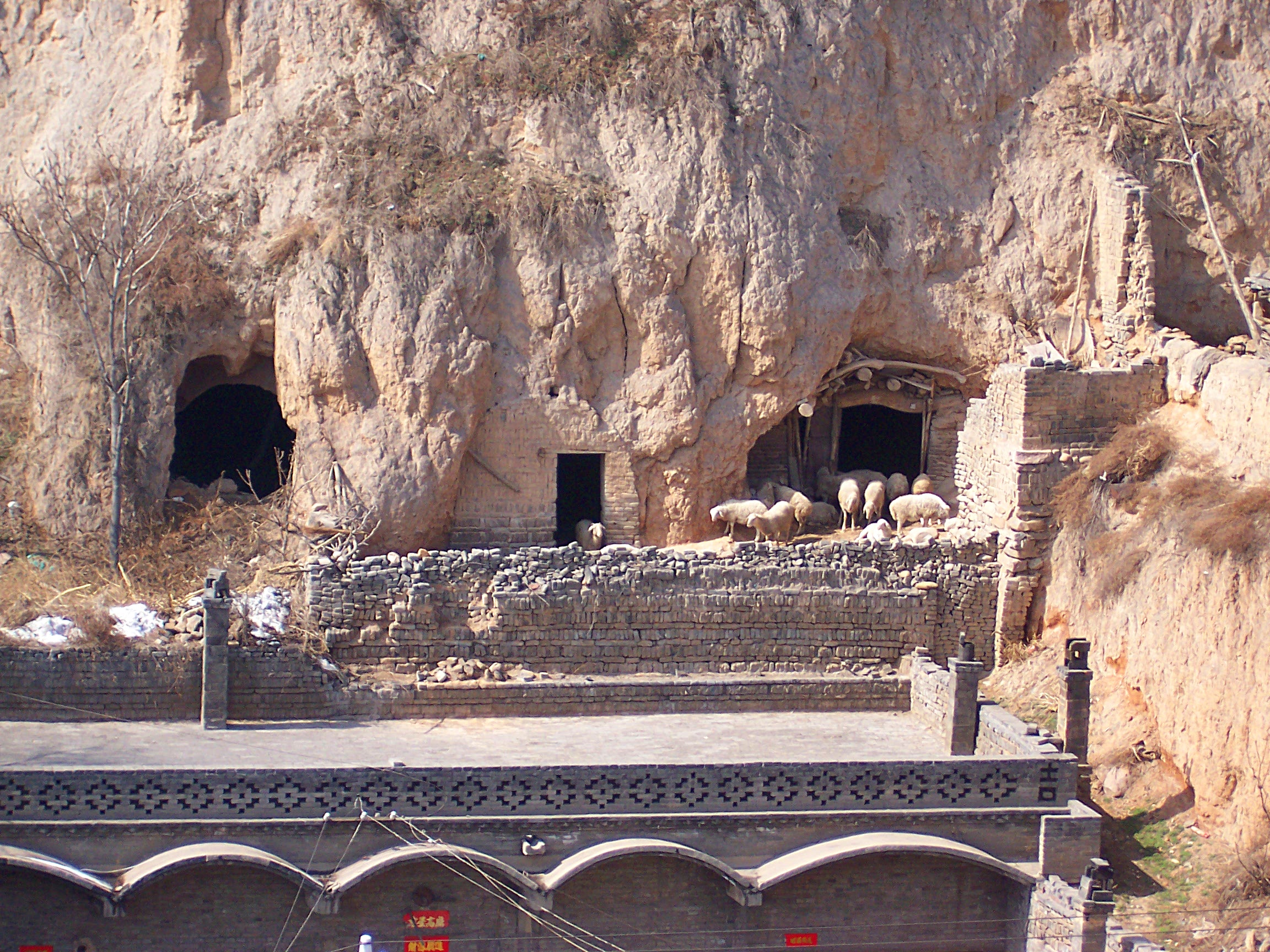
A group of yaodongs in a village in Lingshi, Shanxi, some for humans, others for livestock.

A yaodong (窰 [iɤ] in native Jin Chinese, or 窰洞 [jɑʊ tʊŋ] yáodòng in Beijing Mandarin) is a particular form of earth shelter dwelling common in the Loess Plateau in China's north. They are generally carved out of a hillside or excavated horizontally from a central "sunken courtyard".

The surrounding earth acts as a natural insulator, keeping the interior warm in winter and cool in summer. Consequently, very little heating is required in winter, and in summer, it is as cool as an air-conditioned room.

The history of yaodongs goes back centuries, and they continue to be used. However, they are unsafe in earthquakes. During the 1556 Shaanxi earthquake, some 100,000 people died, mainly because large numbers of yaodongs collapsed. As of the early 2000s, between 30 and 40 million people in northern China still lived in yaodongs, a number rapidly decreasing as millions move to more modern dwellings nearby or move away as part of urbanization in China.

== Types ==
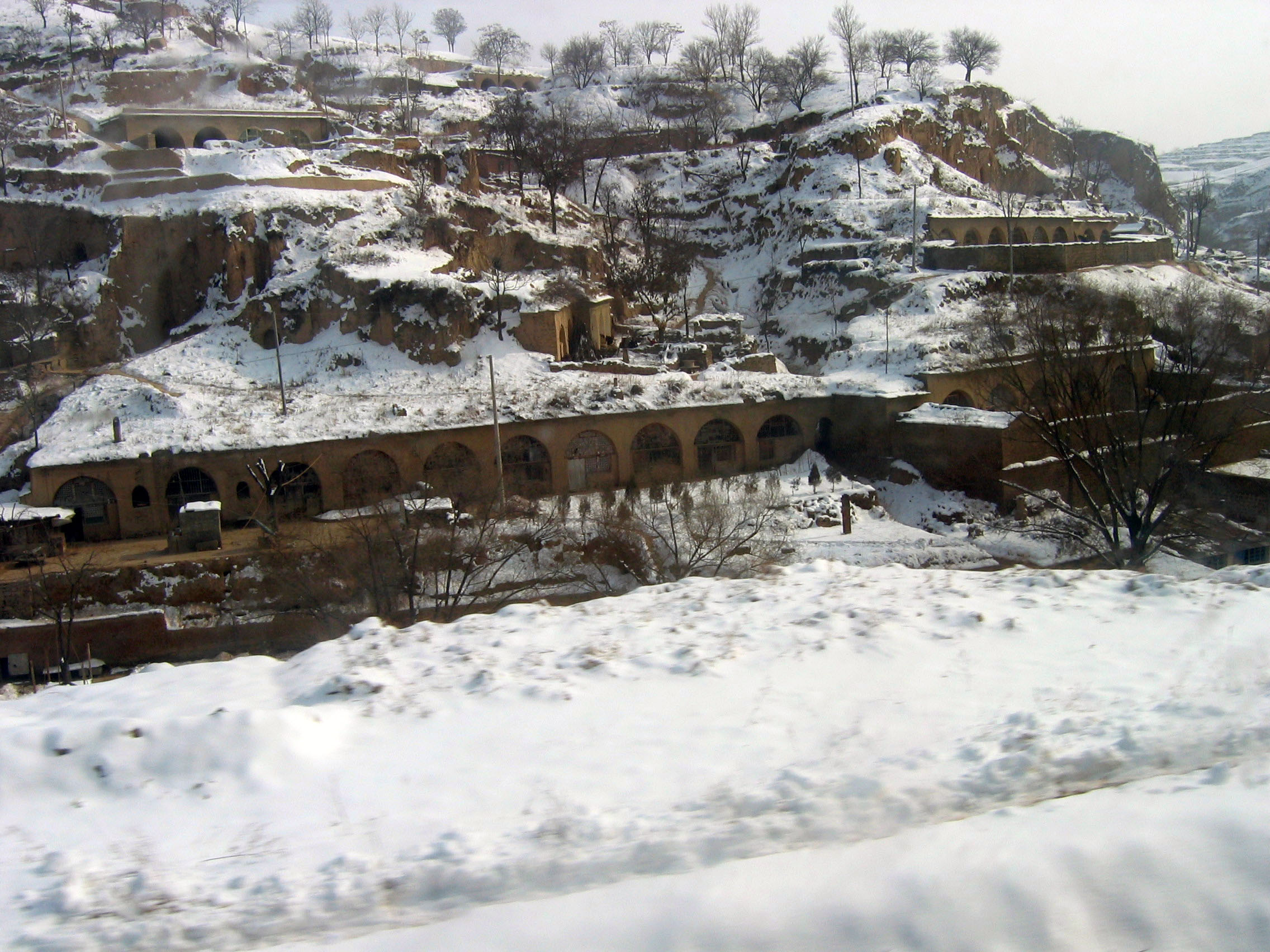
Yaodong covered in snow. Taken in Qingjian, Shaanxi.

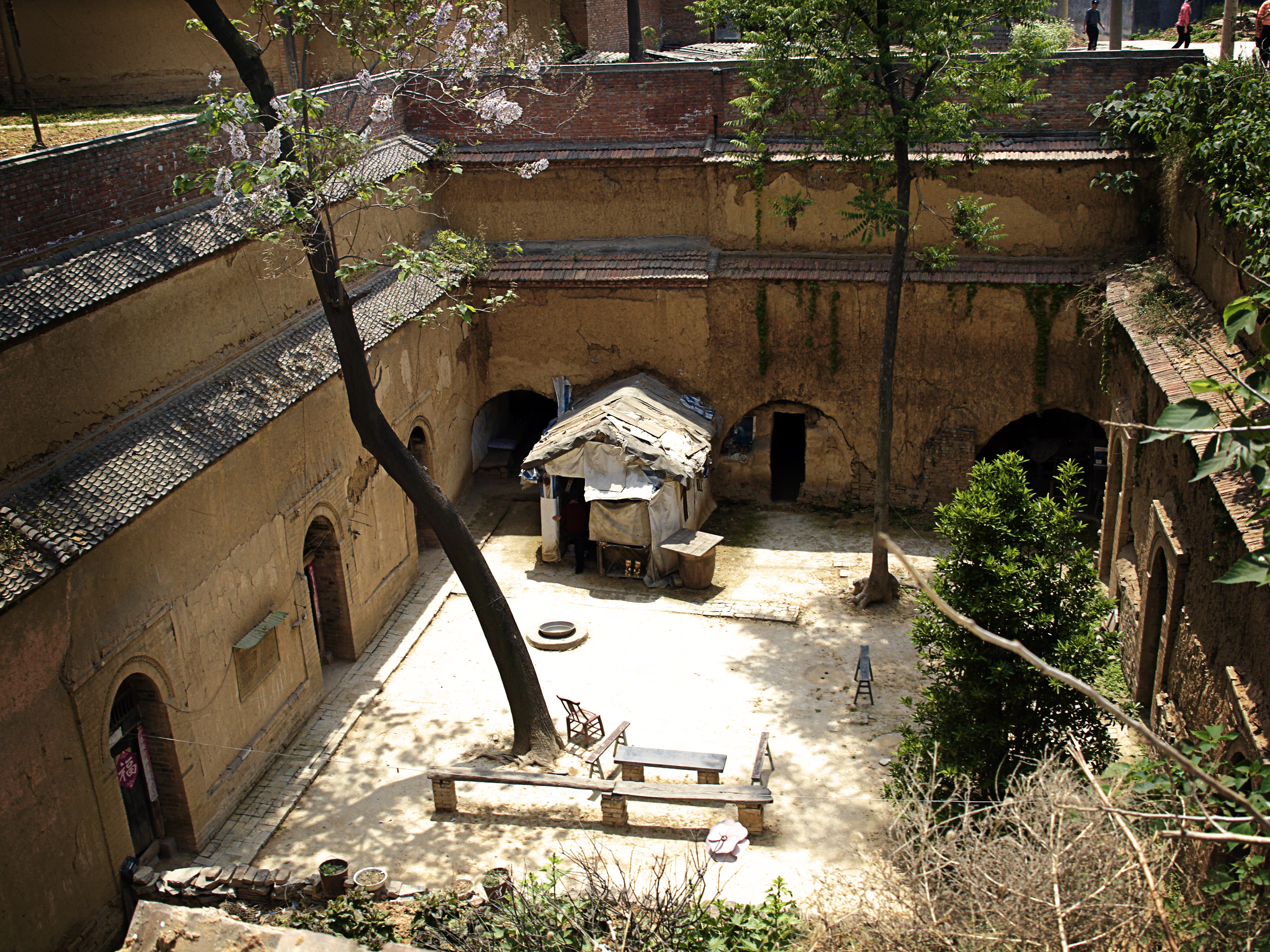
The courtyard of a cave dwelling

The landscape of the Loess Plateau terrain is very complicated, with valleys, slopes, ridges, and hillocks. In order to avoid the wind and utilize sunlight and water, most yaodongs are distributed along the sides of the cliffs and valleys to conform to the terrain – in principle, forming three types of Yaodong.

=== Cliffside Yaodong ===
Cliffside yaodongs (Chinese: 靠崖窑; pinyin: kàoyáyáo) are the most common among all types. People dig caves in the cliff on the edge of the loess slopes with the floor rectangular and the top arched. In front of the cave is an open space for lighting and ventilation, so that the user does not feel the space to be oppressive. According to the number of cave openings, the yaodongs can be further classified into the three-hole type, two-hole type, and single hole type. A typical example is the city of Yan'an.

=== Sunken Yaodong ===
Sunken yaodongs (Chinese: 地坑窑; pinyin: dìkēngyáo) are dug around an excavation conducted at the surface, serving as interior courtyard, called yaodong-well or sunken courtyard. In the Loess Plateau, without hillsides and ravines available, peasants skillfully use loess's features (wall stability) to dig a square pit on the spot, and then dig the cave horizontally on the four walls to form the underground courtyard. In most parts of western Henan, this form of cave is called the "pit yard".

Sunken yaodongs have two types, according to the form of entrance: slope-entrance and flat-entrance. Both are excavations of pits in the flat ground. First, if the yaodong is surrounded by flat ground, a slope can be used for entering and leaving the pits. This is called the "dikenyuan" or the pit courtyard (Chinese: 地坑院; pinyin: De kēng yuàn). Second, if there is a cliff or a steep slope next to the yaodong, it can be used to excavate the corridor through the cliff or slope to reach the horizontal entrance of the courtyard. This type of Sunken yaodong, which is also called the well-courtyard or the well-yaodong, is the majority in the area.

=== Hoop Yaodong ===
The Hoop yaodong (Chinese: 箍窑; pinyin: gūyáo), also called independent yaodong, is the most valuable type considering its construction techniques. In the traditional residential areas in western Henan, the Hoop Yaodongs appear in the places where there are no conditions for excavations of cave dwellings, e.g. the loess layer is thin, the slopes are gentle, the height of the soil cliffs is insufficient, or the bedrock is exposed. A hoop yaodong is usually built wholly or partially outdoors, with an arched structure inspired by the underground dwellings. This arch-shaped form not only reflects the Chinese traditional thinking of a Round sky and Square earth, but more importantly, the high arch of the cave along with high windows allows the sun to further penetrate the cave in winter, therefore making full use of solar radiation. This new vaulted home of this type is now common among farmers in the area.

== Origins ==
The first yaodongs were underground dwellings that date back to the 2nd millennium BC, China's Bronze Age, and according to Chinese tradition, the Xia dynasty. Chinese scholars generally believe that this type of habitat was developed mainly from the Han dynasty (206 BC to 220 AD) on, along with a progressive improvement of construction techniques during the Sui (581 to 618) and Tang (618 to 907) dynasties. During the dynasties Ming (1368 to 1644) and Qing (1644 to 1912), the pace of construction reached its peak.

== Geographic distribution ==
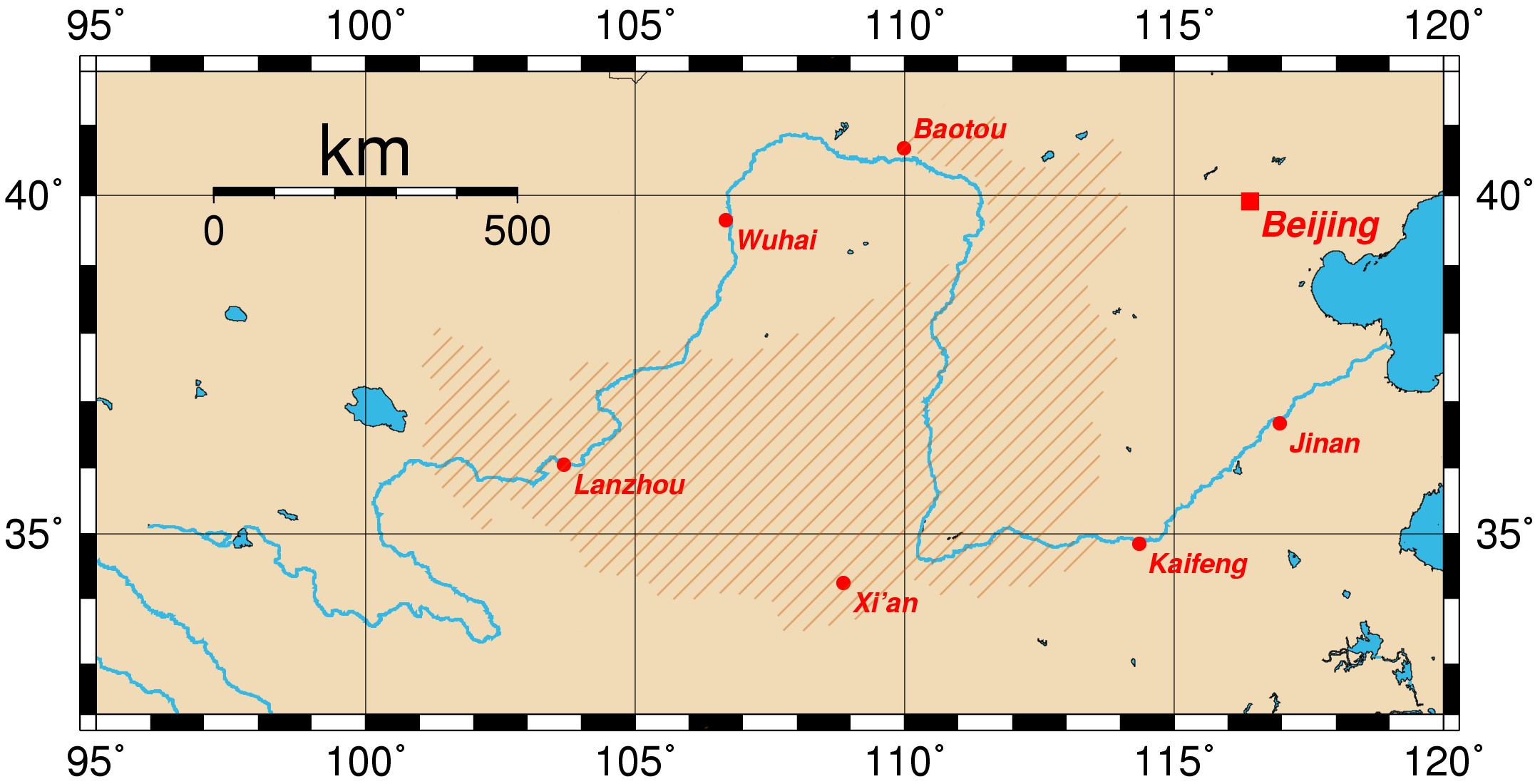
The Loess Plateau in northern China (hatched area) and the valley of the Yellow River

The yaodong homes are common on the Loess Plateau of China in the North, and are found mainly in five provinces: Gansu, Shaanxi, Shanxi, Henan, and the Hui Autonomous Region of Ningxia. In the Qingyang, Gansu region, the ratio of cave dwellers to non-cave dwellers is the highest found anywhere in China.

== Construction ==
More elaborate yaodongs may have a façade built with stones with fine patterns carved on the surface. Yaodongs can also be constructed with stones or bricks as stand-alone structures. The inside walls are usually plastered with lime to make them white. Different types of yaodong have varying construction processes.

1. For the cliffside yaodong, the main structure is the soil wall, and the interior is reinforced with wooden piles. The beams and columns bear the load, forming a structure intended to prevent the cave from collapsing. The usual method of this construction process is to use rock for the wall base, and clay as the top tile. In order to reinforce the cave and reduce costs, walls are made of clay inside and stones outside.
2. Building a hoop yaodong requires a wood frame mold. Because the wood mold can be reused, and the wood consumed is limited, the overall cost can be lower than that of most housing. Moreover, because its space volume is 1/3 smaller than that of a regular house, the hoop yaodong has a strong advantage in energy conservation.
  - The first step in the construction of a hoop yaodong is to dig the foundation, after determining the orientation. Then, the entrance position and the height and thickness of the wall is determined based on the orientation. A hoop yaodong usually has three or five caves.
  - The second step is to excavate the cave. Because a hoop yaodong is built on flat ground, the excavation uses the existing brick wall to make the arch structure, creating the basic spatial form of each cave. The yaodong is covered with at least two meters of mud to ensure the thermal insulation of the cave. The top of the cave is normally capped with a normal house structure.
  - The third step is to build the fence and install doors.

=== Earthquake resilience ===
The death toll of approximately 100,000 direct deaths from the 1556 Shaanxi earthquake is claimed to be in part because it was centered on the Loess Plateau, where many yaodongs collapsed. Though yaodongs were found to have better earthquake resistance than some other types of dwelling common in the region, such as adobe buildings, at lower earthquake intensities wooden truss buildings collapsed at lower rates than yaodong. As a result of the 1920 Haiyuan earthquake both conventional homes and yaodongs collapsed, since neither type of dwelling common to the area was particularly earthquake resilient. According to eyewitnesses, yaodongs withstood the 1976 Tangshan earthquake better than conventional homes, attributed to the soft soil of the region. In Ningxia however, yaodongs were three times more likely to collapse during an earthquake compared to conventional homes. This was attributed to harder soil and the yaodongs being mainly located at the foot of valleys, vulnerable to landslides.

== Notable examples ==
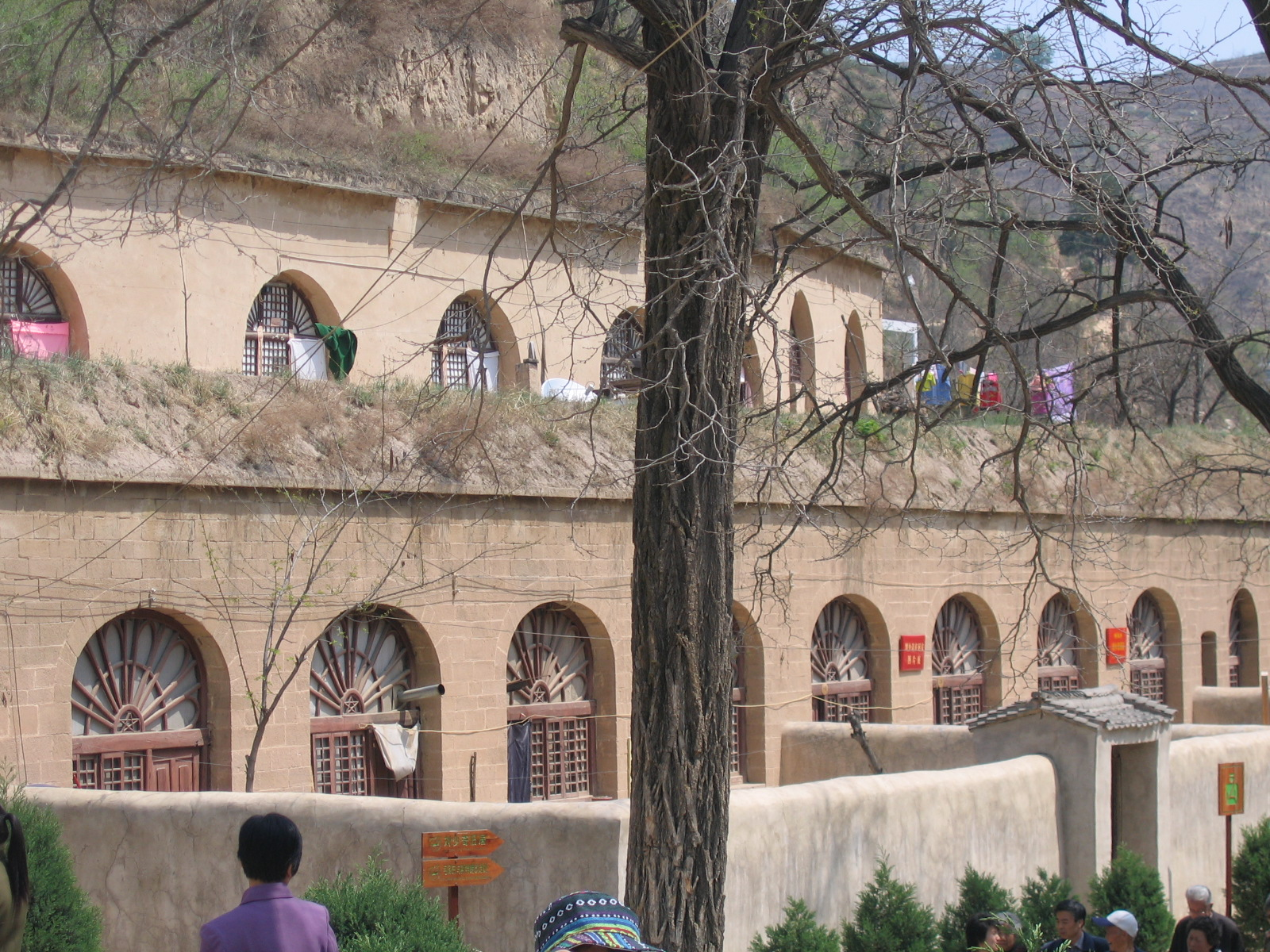
Cave city in Yan'an, Shaanxi – Mao Zedong's headquarters from 1935 to 1948

The most famous yaodongs in China are perhaps those in Yan'an. Edgar Snow visited Mao and his party in Yan'an and wrote Red Star Over China.

== See also ==
- Earth Shelter
- Earthship
- Green building
- Underground living
