= Zhang Weiying =

Chinese economist

- 张维迎
- Zhang Weiying in 2022
- Born: 1 October 1959 (age 67); Wubu County, Shaanxi, China
- Education: Northwest University (BA, MPhil); University of Oxford (DPhil)
- Occupations: Economist, professor, writer
- Years active: 1994–present
- Known for: Advocacy of free markets
- Notable work: Price, the Market and the Entrepreneurs, 30 Years of China's Reform

Zhang Weiying (Chinese: 张维迎; pinyin: Zhāng Wéiyíng; born October 1, 1959) is a Chinese economist and was head of the Guanghua School of Management, Peking University. He is known for his advocacy of free markets and his ideas have been influenced by the Austrian School of economics.

== Biography ==
Zhang Weiying was born into a peasant family. He worked as a peasant of a collective brigade in his home village for two years after graduation from high school in 1975. He passed the first post-Culture Revolution college entrance examination in 1977 and enrolled into college education in early 1978.

He graduated with a bachelor's degree in 1982, and a master's degree in 1984, from Northwest University (China).

Between 1984 and 1990, he was a research fellow of the Economic System Reform Institute of China under the State Commission of Restructuring Economic System. During this period, he was heavily involved in economic reform policy-making in China. He was the first Chinese economist who proposed the dual-track price system (in 1984) and emerged as a strong voice in arguing for it as a mechanism of price liberalization during the Moganshan Conference. Zhang was also known for his contributions to macro-control policy debating, ownership reform debating, and entrepreneurship studies.

He entered Oxford University for further studies in 1990. He received his M. Phil. in economics in 1992 and D. Phil. in economics from Oxford University. His D. Phil. supervisors were James Mirrlees (1996 Nobel Laureate) and Donald Hay.

After he graduated from Oxford, he co-founded China Center for Economic Research (CCER), Peking University in 1994, and worked with the Center first as an associate professor and then as a professor until August 1997. He then moved to Peking University's Guanghua School of Management in September 1997. He was appointed first as the First Associate Dean in 1999 and then as Dean of the Guanghua School of Management from 2006 to 2010. Under his leadership, Guanghua School of Management went through a fundamental change and became world-wide known. From 2002 to 2012, he also served as the Assistant President of Peking University. He was the major architecture of the University’s faculty system reform in 2003, which introduced US university-like system into China

Weiying Zhang moved back to the National School of Development (NSD for short, formerly named China Center for Economic Research) at Peking University in 2014.

He has been working with NSD since then. The university identified him as Boya Distinguished Professor of Economics and Senior Professor of Economics at Peking University's National School of Development.

In 2021, Weiying Zhang co-founded the New Village Academy for Entrepreneurship in his home village in northern Shaanxi in partnership with Chinese entrepreneur Huang Nubo. Zhang serves as the academy's chief academic supervisor.

In 2025, Weiying Zhang was appointed as the director of the Institute for Entrepreneurship and Innovation at the Tsientang Institute for Advanced Study, at Hangzhou, Zhejiang Province.

He has been the Chief Economist of Yabuli China Entrepreneur Form since 2001.

His book The Logic of the Market was a finalist for the Hayek Prize in both 2016 and 2017. His subsequent book Re-Understanding Entrepreneurship, published in 2024, was also a finalist for the Hayek Book Prize in 2025.

== Research and scholarly work ==
Weiying Zhang's research has focused on the economics of the firm, property rights, corporate governance, entrepreneurship, market institutions, and China's economic reforms. His early work examined the relationship between ownership, incentives, managerial decision-making, and enterprise performance, including theories of the firm and the role of residual claims and decision rights in state-owned enterprise reform. His research has also addressed information economics, game theory, contracts, trust, and the institutional foundations of markets.

A recurring theme in Zhang's work is the role of entrepreneurs in the market and economic development. His publications have examined entrepreneurial decision-making, the relationship between entrepreneurship and economic growth, and the institutional conditions under which entrepreneurs operate. His books include An Entrepreneurial-Contractual Theory of the Firm (1995), The Theory of the Firm and Chinese Enterprise Reform (1999), Information, Trust and Law (2003), Price, Market and Entrepreneurship (2006), The Origin of the Capitalist Firm: An Entrepreneurial/Contractual Theory of the Firm (2018), and Re-Understanding Entrepreneurship: What It Is and Why It Matters (2024).

Zhang has also written extensively on China's transition toward a market economy. His books The Logic of the Market (2010; revised edition 2012 and 2019), The Power of Ideas (2014), the Market and Government: the Core Game in China’s Reform (2014), The Road Leading to the Market (2017), and Ideas for China's Future (2020) discuss economic reform, market institutions, competition, and the relationship between markets and government. His work has generally emphasized the importance of market mechanisms, private enterprise, property rights, and institutional arrangements in economic development.

His later scholarship has placed greater emphasis on entrepreneurship and entrepreneurial knowledge. In Re-Understanding Entrepreneurship: What It Is and Why It Matters, published in English by Cambridge University Press in 2024, Zhang examines entrepreneurial decision-making, the role of entrepreneurs in market theory, uncertainty and innovation, industrial policy, and the institutional environment for entrepreneurship. The book argues for understanding markets not only as mechanisms for allocating resources but also as processes of discovery and creation, and proposes a shift from a price-centered to an entrepreneur-centered approach to analyzing markets.

Zhang has described entrepreneurship as a longstanding theme of his research, noting that his first article on the subject appeared in 1984. His later work distinguishes entrepreneurial decision-making from forms of decision-making based primarily on scientific prediction, emphasizing the role of imagination, judgment, and discovery in entrepreneurial activity.

His research has also addressed innovation and economic institutions. In a chapter published in The Oxford Handbook of China Innovation, Zhang examined the relationship between institutional reform, competition, and innovation in China. Other work has considered the future roles of private and state-owned enterprises, property rights, corporate governance, and the institutional environment for economic activity.

Zhang is a strong opponent of industrial policy. He argues that proponents of industrial policy totally misunderstand the market and entrepreneurs. His debate on industrial policy with Justin YF Lin in late 2016 attracted a world-wide attention on this issue.

== Awards and honors ==
- World Bank Scholarship (1990-1993)
- Nuffield Scholarship, Oxford (1992-1994)
- The George Webb Medley Prize for the best thesis, Oxford University (1992)
- Lionel Robbins Memorial Scholarship (1992-1994), LSE
- CCTV's Chinese Economy Person of the Year, 2002.
- Reform Star, China Reform, 2003.
- Presidential Award of the Academy of International Business, 2006.
- China Economic Theory Innovation Award, 2011.
- Most Influential Economist of the Year, NetEase Finance, 2013.
- Hayek Prize finalist for The Logic of the Market, 2016 and 2017.
- Fellow of the Chinese Academy of Management, 2023.
- Honorary Doctor of Social Science, Hang Seng University of Hong Kong, 2025.
- Fellow of the UK/European Chinese Economic Association, 2025.
- Hayek Prize finalist for Re-Understanding Entrepreneurship, 2025.

== Works ==
- Zhang Weiying. (1995). The Entrepreneurial/Contractual Theory of the Firm (《企业的企业家-契约理论》）. Shanghai Renmin Press.
- Zhang Weiying. (1996). Game Theory and Information Economics (《博弈论与信息经济学》）. Shanghai Renmin Press.
- Zhang Weiying. (1999). The Theory of the Firm and the Reform of Chinese Enterprises (《企业理论与中国企业改革》）. Peking University Press.
- Zhang Weiying. (2001). Property Rights, Government and Reputation （《产权、政府与信誉》）. SDX Joint Publishing Company.
- Zhang Weiying. (2003). Information, Trust, and the Law（《信息、信任与法律》）. SDX Joint Publishing Company.
- Zhang Weiying. (2005). Property Rights, Incentives and Corporate Governance （《产权、激励与公司治理》）. Economic Sciences Press.
- Zhang Weiying. (2006). Competitiveness and Firm Growth （《竞争力与企业成长》）. Peking University Press.
- Zhang Weiying. (2006). Price, the Market, and the Entrepreneurs （《价格、市场与企业家》）. Peking University Press.
- Zhang Weiying. (editor) (2008). 30 Years of China's Reform （《中国改革30年》）. Shanghai Renmin Press.
- Zhang Weiying. (2010). The Logic of the Market_ （《市场的逻辑》）. Shanghai Renmin Press.
- Zhang Weiying. (2012). _Changing China: The Way Forward to Reform China（《什么改变中国》）. China CITIC Press.
- Zhang, W. (2012). The road to market [《通往市场之路》]. Zhejiang University Press.
- Zhang, W. (2012). The logic of the market (updated ed.) [《市场的逻辑》]. Shanghai Renmin Publishing.
- Zhang, W. (2013). The game and society [《博弈与社会》]. Peking University Press.
- Zhang, W. (2014). Lectures on game and society [《博弈与社会讲义》]. Peking University Press.
- Zhang, W. (2014). Understanding company: Property rights, incentives and governance (2nd ed.) [《理解公司：产权、激励与治理》]. Shanghai Renmin Press.
- Zhang, W., & Sheng, B. (2014). The entrepreneurs: King of economic growth (3rd ed.) [《企业家：经济增长的国王》]. Shanghai Renmin Press.
- Zhang, W. (2014). New enlightenment for reform [《改革新启蒙》]. CITIC Press.
- Zhang, W. (2014). Market and government [《市场与政府》]. Northwest University Press.
- Zhang, W. (2014). The power of ideas [《理念的力量》]. Northwest University Press.
- Zhang, W. (2015). The logic of the market: An insider's view of Chinese economic reform. Cato Institute.
- Zhang, W. (2017). The road leading to the market. Routledge.
- Zhang, W. (2018). Game theory and society. Routledge.
- Zhang, W. (2018). The origin of the capitalist firm: An entrepreneurial/contractual theory of the firm. Springer.
- Zhang, W., & Wang, Y. (2019). Entrepreneurship and Chinese economy [《企业家精神与中国经济》]. CITIC Press.
- Zhang, W. (2020). Ideas for China's future. Palgrave Macmillan.
- Zhang, W. (2021). Information, trust and law (3rd ed.) [《信息、信任与法律》]. SDX Joint Publishing Company.
- Zhang, W. (2022). Reunderstanding entrepreneurship [《重新理解企业家精神》]. Hainan Press.
- Zhang, W. (2024). Re-understanding entrepreneurship: What it is and why it matters. Cambridge University Press.
