= 1988 price reform in China =

Chinese government economic policy

In 1988, the government of the People's Republic of China attempted to carry out a price reform. This reform aimed to solve a series of complex economic problems under the dual-track price system by raising the prices of most commodities in the short term. However, before the reform could be implemented, the news leaked and triggered a buying frenzy among the people, which led to even more severe inflation on the basis of existing inflation, and the reform was forced to be shelved.

== Background ==
From the fourth quarter of 1984, the economy developed too fast and credit was issued too aggressively. The central government tried to control credit issuance through administrative means, but it failed. In 1987, the gross national product grew by more than 10%, national income grew by more than 10%, total industrial output grew by more than 17%, agriculture grew by nearly 6%, and the commodity retail price index rose by 7.3%.

At that time, China was carrying out reform and opening up, transitioning from the original planned economy to a market economy to a certain extent. Commodity prices were subject to a dual-track price system, that is, the prices of some commodities were controlled by the state plan, while the prices of others were determined by the market. The problem brought about by the state controlling commodity prices was that, on the one hand, the state needed to invest a lot of fiscal funds in price subsidies for urban agricultural and sideline products, and on the other hand, the wages paid to workers were too low and their purchasing power was weak; while enterprises lacked the motivation to produce and could not reform according to market rules, thus failing to gain real competitiveness. This led to dissatisfaction among the state, enterprises, and the people. At the same time, some people took advantage of the dual-track system to arbitrage, hoarding products under the state plan control at low prices through various means, and then selling them at high prices in the market to make huge profits, which affected the state's control over prices and caused market instability and price fluctuations.

In early 1988, CPI growth reached a turning point. During the inflation cycle from 1986 to 1988, the monthly CPI exceeded 5% in January 1987 and reached a peak of 28.4% in February 1989, lasting for 26 months. The CPI in January 1988 increased by 9.4% year-on-year, which was the turning point of this inflation cycle. This means that on the one hand, inflation continued to worsen and prices continued to rise, which drew strong reactions from the people, while on the other hand, the situation of severe price distortion did not change significantly. The dual-track pricing system led to power-money transactions and " official profiteering," which caused great dissatisfaction among the people and was also heavily criticized in terms of policy.

At that time, the top leadership of the Central Committee of the Chinese Communist Party believed that these problems were caused by the dual-track pricing system implemented under the planned economy system, and that prices should be brought back to market regulation as soon as possible. Deng Xiaoping also proposed that we should be determined to carry out price reform, "better to get it over with sooner rather than later" and "better to have a short pain than a long one". General Secretary Zhao Ziyang believed that since the price distortion phenomenon had not been fundamentally changed and prices were rising, we should simply adjust prices in a planned and comprehensive manner within a certain period, such as two or three years, by bearing a certain price increase index, such as a price increase of 30-50%, so as to change the current situation of serious price distortion.

== History ==
=== The proposal ===
Following a conversation with Deng Xiaoping on 5 May 1988, Premier Li Peng reported to the Politburo that Deng wanted to speed up reforms to solve the problems regarding the price system. Zhao initially took this as a goal for "the next few years" instead of an immediate push. He told a Politburo Standing Committee meeting on 16 May that urban prices would rise 15–18 percent and said warned against "dragging it out again and not making a systemic decision" but said this would involve "a long-term plan" that would replace the dual-track price system "step by step" instead of full price liberalization. Yao Yilin was picked for leading the reform by Zhao. Deng, unhappy by the gradualist approach, asked Zhao why he was pursuing a gradualist approach. On 19 May, he said that "The problem of prices has remained unsolved for many years. . . . We have no choice but to carry out price reform, and we must do so despite all risks and difficulties".

Zhao's tone changed after Deng's reaction. On 30 May 1988, Zhao delivered a report entitled “Establishing a New Order of Socialist Market Economy” at an enlarged meeting of the Politburo. The report proposed to use a certain price increase index each year for five years to achieve price rationalization and solve the problem of unreasonable wages. Zhao Ziyang had shown his proposal to Deng Xiaoping beforehand and received Deng Xiaoping's approval. The meeting decided that the State Council would formulate the plan, and the specific plan was later drafted by Vice Premier Yao Yilin and others. In July, Zhao warned against notions that "a market system would appear after a price reform without reform of the public sector". He heard proposals from the eight teams of economists, though none of them promoted immediate price liberalization. Deng continued to promote rapid price liberalization. From 5 to 9 August, Premier Li Peng held a State Council meeting which endorsed a "safe and feasible" pace for price reform.

In August 1988, the reform plan was finalized. There was no obvious internal disagreement when the central government formulated the plan; although Beijing and Shanghai had concerns, they did not express their opinions clearly. From 15 to 17 August 1988, the 10th plenary meeting of the Politburo was held in Beidaihe, and adopted the "Preliminary Plan on Price and Wage Reform"; Yao Yilin presented the reform at the meeting. The meeting believed that the general direction of price reform was: "The prices of a few key commodities and services shall be managed by the state, while the prices of the vast majority of commodities shall be opened up and regulated by the market, so as to transform the price formation mechanism and gradually realize the requirement of 'the state regulates the market and the market guides enterprises'." The meeting required that the prices of most commodities be liberalized. The Politburo approved the plan on 19 August.

=== Bank runs and panic buying ===
Xinhua News Agency announced the reforms in bold language, stating "price and wage reforms are the key to the reform of the entire system". After news of the price reform was about to be implemented spread in society, the trend of a sharp rise in prices appeared ahead of schedule, and a wave of bank runs and panic buying occurred in both urban and rural areas. Various depositors rushed to withdraw their money from banks, and banks were in dire need of funds. In a county in Hubei, the bank counters were overturned by depositors because the bank had no money to pay them. Bank runs across the country led to savings withdrawals of an estimated renminbi 38.94 billion. This also alerted the government.

Major cities and cities experienced a serious buying frenzy. In the height of summer, Hangzhou residents rushed to buy sweaters and trousers; in Kunming, where the climate is mild, people rushed to buy electric fans, which are usually hard to sell; a woman in Guangzhou rushed to buy 10 boxes of laundry detergent; a resident in Nanjing rushed to buy 500 boxes of matches; and a resident in Wuhan rushed to buy 200 kilograms of salt. Amid the frenzy of buying, commodity prices continued to rise. Cheng Zhiping, then director of the State Price Bureau, said, "The price of a 1-jin bottle of Moutai liquor jumped from 20 yuan to more than 300 yuan, Fenjiu from 8 yuan to 40 yuan, Gujinggongjiu from 12 yuan to 70 yuan, and Zhonghua cigarettes from 1.8 yuan to more than 10 yuan per pack." Wang Yongzhi, president of the China Price Association, said, "People went crazy and bought whatever they saw, regardless of whether they needed it or not, and they didn't care about the quality. They would buy anything that had cold air in the refrigerator and any television that showed a picture."

A wave of competition to purchase agricultural and sideline products also occurred in rural areas. In Hechuan County, Tongliang County, Tongnan County, Wusheng County and other places in Sichuan Province, some units and individuals competed to raise prices to buy silkworm cocoons, which forced state-owned purchasing stations to raise their purchase prices. The purchase price of silkworm cocoons in Taihe District of Hechuan County reached 12.8 yuan per kilogram, which was almost double the maximum purchase price set by Sichuan Province. On 8 June 1988, some state-owned purchasing stations had to suspend the purchase of silkworm cocoons due to a lack of funds. Inflation also spiked; a survey of thirty-two large and medium-sized cities revealed a 24.7 percent price increase during the month of August.

=== Reform postponed ===
On 24 August 1988, Zhao chaired a meeting of the Central Financial and Economic Affairs Leading Group regarding the 'lack of public confidence in the price reforms". In the following days, Zhao spoke repeatedly with Yao Yilin and Li Peng about the panic buying. On 30 August, Li Peng chaired an emergency State Council meeting focused on "curbing price hikes and panic buying". On 2 September. Zhao acknowledged problems caused by the price reforms in a Politburo meeting. On 12 September, Deng held a meeting with top Party leaders where he acknowledged the need for retrenchment to improve the economic environment, but stressed that reform and opening up should continue. In late September 1988, Zhao presided over the third plenary session of the 13th Central Committee, where he said inflation had not been properly controlled and that focus would be on "managing the economic environment and rectifying economic order". Previously, Zhao had talked to Yao Yilin about postponing price reform, and Yao thought it could be postponed until the second half of 1989. Later, Zhao believed that the current economic environment was not conducive to price reform, so he decided to postpone the reform and carry out rectification and consolidation first to improve the economic environment and solve problems such as inflation. Price reform would be carried out after these problems were solved. Zhao Ziyang emphasized: "The final decision to postpone price reform and shift to rectification and consolidation was my determination."

Before Zhao decided to postpone the reform, Deng Xiaoping, who was unaware of the situation, spoke with Premier Li Peng, encouraging Zhao and Li and saying that he could take the risk if anything happened. After Zhao Ziyang made up his mind, he talked to Li Peng and Yao Yilin once. Li Peng and Yao Yilin agreed, and Zhao Ziyang then reported to Deng Xiaoping. Subsequently, a meeting of the Politburo was held, and the decision to postpone the reform was finally made.

There have been various rumors about this reform since then, especially after the 1989 Tiananmen Square protests and massacre, there have been various rumors about the relationship between Deng Xiaoping and the price reform. For example, some rumors claimed that the reform was led and promoted by Deng Xiaoping, and that the price panic was caused entirely by Deng Xiaoping's speech when he met with foreign guests in his capacity as Chairman of the Central Military Commission. Regarding the relationship between Deng Xiaoping and the price reform, Zhao Ziyang clarified:

Therefore, regarding the 1988 price reform, if we're talking about responsibility, the responsibility doesn't lie with him; it's primarily my responsibility, because I was the one who proposed all of these things. I was the one who initially proposed price reform, and I also presided over and approved the design of the reform plan and the discussions within the State Council. Finally, when difficulties arose, the decision to postpone and slow it down was also my suggestion, which he approved. As for Deng Xiaoping's view on price reform, as I mentioned earlier, he was primarily concerned about our excessive fiscal burden, including price subsidies for urban agricultural and sideline products. He frequently mentioned this issue, saying that prices were unreasonable, and that hundreds of billions of yuan of national fiscal revenue were used for price subsidies. He asked Yao Yilin several times, "How many billions of yuan in fiscal subsidies will this reform reduce? How much more will subsidies increase if we don't reform?" That was his concern. Our designed price reform focused more on making prices reasonable, and how to enable enterprises to form market conditions through fair competition, truly establishing standards for enterprise efficiency. That was our perspective.

== Aftermath ==
After three years of rectification and reform, the economic situation in mainland China has undergone new changes. The State Council adopted administrative means to control prices and basic construction, and canceled some of the reform measures that had been implemented to open up and revitalize enterprises, and took back some powers that the central government had delegated to local governments and enterprises. Soon the country experienced an economic downturn, a weak market, and stagnant production.

As for the unification of the dual-track pricing system, the price unification was eventually successful as supply caught up and prices fell. This was primarily due to the significant decrease in the proportion of "in-system" commodities. By 1989, the planned supply of means of production accounted for only about 40% of the total social supply. In addition, as the price difference between "in-system" and "out-of-system" narrowed significantly, the government took advantage of the economic downturn around 1990 to gradually narrow the price difference between the two tracks, eventually leading to the integration of planned prices into market prices. Prices controls of nearly all major categories of production materials, agricultural products, and light industrial products were eventually abolished over the course of 1992.

== Analysis ==
In the spring of 1989, Zhao Ziyang sent An Zhiwen and others to Hong Kong to invite six economists (all academicians of the Academia Sinica) including Chiang Shuo-chieh, president of the Chung-Hua Institution for Economic Research in Taiwan, to a symposium on the Chinese economy. Their views, such as that prices must be determined by the market and that solving the financial deficit must rely on bank savings interest rates being higher than the inflation rate, greatly inspired Zhao Ziyang.

The failure of the price reform greatly weakened the authority of Zhao Ziyang. Afterwards, in summarizing and reviewing this history, Zhao believed that the reason why this price reform failed was not because of inflation, but because the basic method of this reform was fundamentally wrong. He said:

As mentioned earlier, since the Third Plenary Session of the Twelfth CCP Central Committee, we have adopted a policy of combining adjustment and liberalization in price reform. Some prices are adjusted by the government from top to bottom, while others are liberalized. For the same commodity, part of the planned price is adjusted by the government, while another part can be liberalized, i.e., a dual-track pricing system is implemented. This means that the overall approach is market-oriented, gradually liberalizing prices and allowing the market to determine them. However, the proposed price reform plan does not follow this gradual liberalization and market-determined pricing; instead, the government significantly adjusts prices to achieve price rationalization. This reflects both the eagerness for quick results in price reform at the time and the attempt to use government power to change the dual-track system of planned and market prices, achieving convergence or narrowing the price difference between planned and market prices. This approach fundamentally violates the correct direction of price reform. Because it does not allow prices to be gradually determined by the market, but rather determines prices through planned adjustments, it essentially follows the old path of planned price determination. Years of experience have taught us that top-down government price adjustments cannot rationalize prices or change the severely distorted price situation. It is safe to say that without severe inflation, even if this reform plan were introduced and implemented, it would be impossible to solve the problem. If not handled properly, the price reform could risk reverting to the old ways.

He also believed that it was correct for him to propose suspending price reforms at that time, but the decision to implement rectification was unnecessary and had an adverse effect on economic development. In fact, implementing value-preserving savings at that time could have effectively alleviated inflation, and rectification was not necessary. Rectification was implemented because he overestimated the economic situation.
