= Moganshan Conference =

The Moganshan Conference, officially the Symposium for Young and Middle-aged Economic Scientists. was held in Moganshan, Deqing County, Zhejiang in September 1984, which promoted the process of China's reform and opening up.

== Background ==
At the opening ceremony of the Moganshan Conference, Wang Ruisun, editor-in-chief of the Economic Weekly, one of the organizers, mentioned the background of the conference in his speech: "This conference was held under the circumstances of the in-depth development of China's economic system reform and the very active economic scientific research." In December 1978, the third plenary session of the 11th Central Committee of the Chinese Communist Party made the decision to reform the economic system. At first, the focus of economic system reform was on rural areas, and only partial decentralization and profit-sharing pilot projects were carried out in cities. By 1984, rural reform had made great progress, but urban reform had not yet started in general, and the country faced the challenge of expanding from rural reform and partial enterprise pilot reform to comprehensive reform. Deng Xiaoping pointed out that "reform should be shifted from rural areas to cities." However, due to the influence of the planned economy system and ideological reasons (for example, in the campaign against spiritual pollution in 1983, some people in the Party criticized the theory of commodity economy as "spiritual pollution"), the reform was difficult to carry out.

During the Spring Festival of 1984, Deng Xiaoping inspected the south and delivered a speech on 24 February after returning to Beijing. The top leadership of the CCP decided to convene the third plenary session of the 12th CCP Central Committee in October 1984 to discuss and decide on several major issues concerning economic system reform.

At that time, the most prominent theoretical issue was the target model for the reform and opening up: whether to continue operating under a planned economy (or a variation thereof—"planned economy as the mainstay, market regulation as a supplement") or to move towards a socialist commodity economy. As early as the early 1980s, economists had proposed "socialist commodity economy" as the theoretical basis for the reform target model. For example, Xue Muqiao stated in his explanation of "Preliminary Opinions on Economic System Reform" that "the socialist economy we are now proposing is a commodity economy where public ownership of the means of production is dominant and multiple economic components coexist; this is a challenge to the dogma that has dominated for the past 30 years." However, this view was opposed by some within the Party. For instance, Yuan Mu, who participated in drafting the report for the 12th National Congress of the Chinese Communist Party, wrote to Hu Qiaomu, saying, "We must never summarize our economy as a commodity economy," otherwise "it will inevitably weaken the planned economy." Hu Qiaomu forwarded this letter, and thereafter the "socialist commodity economy theory" was criticized. However, by the time the "Decision on Economic System Reform" of the Third Plenary Session of the 12th Central Committee of the Chinese Communist Party was drafted in 1984, this crucial issue could not be avoided. Historical records show that “the drafting of this document began in June 1984. It took more than a month to come up with an outline, but this outline did not deviate from the original tone of ‘planned economy as the mainstay and market regulation as the supplement’. Hu Yaobang, the General Secretary of the CCP Central Committee at the time, was very dissatisfied with this, so he readjusted the drafting team of the document.”

In June 1984, the central leadership proposed: "What is needed now is bold exploration." Therefore, before the Third Plenary Session of the Twelfth CCP Central Committee made a decision on economic system reform, it was necessary for all sectors of society, including young and middle-aged economists, to "boldly explore" and offer suggestions to the central government. Since the Third Plenary Session of the Eleventh CCP Central Committee, with the development of the ideological liberation movement, a group of young and middle-aged economists have become active. At that time, there were three main teams of economic scientists: first, young teachers and graduate students in colleges and universities; second, young research teams of the Chinese Academy of Social Sciences and local academies of social sciences; and third, young researchers from relevant research institutions of the central and state ministries in Beijing, as well as research organizations affiliated with relevant ministries and having a non-governmental nature (such as the " China Rural Development Problems Research Group ", abbreviated as "Agricultural Development Group"). In addition, there were many young and middle-aged people in the private sector who were concerned about reform.

These economic scientists dared to think and speak out, and put forward many valuable insights. For example, at the end of 1979, young scholars Zhu Jiaming, Wang Qishan, Weng Yongxi, and Huang Jiangnan from Beijing were received by Premier Zhao Ziyang of the State Council to listen to their opinions on reform and opening up. This was the first "dialogue between the old and the young," and the participants also included cadres of the State Council in charge of economic work. After that, the articles published by these four young people mainly included “The difficulties, decision-making choices and short-term prospects of China’s national economy at present” (published on December 2, 1980, in the No. 12 issue of the “Briefing of the First National Academic Conference of the China Future Research Association”), “Some views on the current economic situation and the adjustment of the national economy in China” (published on January 10, 1981, in the No. 1 issue of “Internal Manuscripts” edited by the editorial office of the Red Flag Magazine (total No. 47)), “Some views on the problems of several stages of China’s economic adjustment and reform” (April 1981), “A preliminary exploration of the economic development model of Guangdong Province” (August 1981), “Some views on the problems of China’s agricultural development strategy” (November 1981 issue of “Economic Research”), and “Some views on the current problems of China’s national economy” (January 1982), etc. In November 1983, an article titled "Standing on Solid Ground: An Introduction to the Research and Exploration of Four Young Comrades" was published in the magazine under the pseudonym "Xin Han". This was the first time that the media referred to them as the "Four Gentlemen".

In addition, young economists in Shanghai, Tianjin, Guangdong, Zhejiang, Inner Mongolia, Shaanxi and other places were also very active. All of these provided the ideological and organizational foundation for the convening of the Moganshan Conference.

== Preparation ==
The Moganshan Conference was initiated by young and middle-aged economists, hosted by news organizations and local research institutions, and attended and supported by personnel from the central and state departments. The central topic was "Urban economic system reform". The name "Academic Symposium of Young and Middle-aged Economic Scientists" and the meeting place Moganshan were initially proposed in February 1984 by Zhu Jiaming of the State Council's Technical Economic Research Center, Liu Youcheng of the Zhejiang Provincial Economic Research Center, Huang Jiangnan of the Institute of Industrial Economics of the Chinese Academy of Social Sciences, and Sun Haohui in Hangzhou, Zhejiang. After returning to Beijing, Zhu Jiaming and Huang Jiangnan discussed and obtained support from Zhang Gang of the Economic Weekly and Wang Qishan of the Rural Policy Research Office of the Secretariat of the CCP Central Committee. The Rural Policy Research Office of the Secretariat of the CCP Central Committee supported the conference funding.

One day in early summer of 1984, Zhu Jiaming, Huang Jiangnan, and Zhang Gang went to the Institute of Economics of Nankai University in Tianjin for academic exchange and met with graduate students. Researchers Li Luoli, Du Xia, Jin Yanshi, Chang Xiuzhe and others from the institute came forward to talk. During the discussion, Zhu Jiaming and others hoped for a gathering of young and middle-aged people, which was agreed upon by the institute staff. Later, on the train back to Beijing from Tianjin, Zhu Jiaming and others formed a clearer idea and drafted materials on holding a "Conference of Young Economic Scientists".

At that time, it was difficult for young and middle-aged economists to organize this national academic conference. Therefore, it was organized by central news organizations and local research institutions. The Economic Daily, Economic Weekly, China National Radio, World Economic Herald, China Youth Daily, China Youth, China Village and Town Industry Information News, Economic Efficiency News, Zhejiang Academy of Social Sciences, Zhejiang Economic Research Center and other units participated as co-organizers.

The meeting established a preparatory working group. The group leader was Zhang Gang, the deputy group leaders were Xu Jingan ( State Commission for Restructuring the Economic System) and Huang Jiangnan, and the members were Lu Jian ( Office of the Central Leading Group for Financial and Economic Affairs ), Zhou Qiren ( Research Group on Rural Development Issues in China ), Gao Shangang (Economic Daily ), Cui Weide (China Youth Magazine ), Lu Weiwei (China Youth Daily), Zhu Xingqing ( World Economic Herald ), Zhou Ping (China National Radio), Liu Youcheng, Wang Xiaolu (Chinese Social Sciences Magazine), Sun Xiangjian ( State Economic Commission Finance and Trade Bureau), Hu Shiying (Self-Study Magazine), Zhou Xiaochuan ( Tsinghua University ), and Lu Mai ( Beijing Economic College ).

On June 12, 1984, the Economic Daily, under the leadership of its editor-in-chief An Gang and deputy editor-in-chief Ding Wang, published a message entitled “This newspaper and five other units will hold a symposium on economics for young and middle-aged people, and widely solicit papers and invite selected people to attend as official representatives”, stating that “a symposium on economics for young and middle-aged people will be held in Zhejiang Province in early September. The central topic of discussion is the major theoretical and practical issues in China’s economic system reform. Starting from mid-September, papers will be widely solicited from young and middle-aged economic scientists across the country. Selected papers will be invited to attend the meeting as official representatives.” This call for papers was “selecting people based on their papers”, and it was proposed that “relationships, academic qualifications, professional titles, professions, and reputations should not be considered.” From June 12 to August 15, the conference organizing committee received more than 1,300 papers from all over the country. The authors of the papers included both professional researchers and amateur researchers working at the grassroots level.

The daily work of the conference preparation group was undertaken by young and middle-aged scholars in Beijing. The heads of the paper review group were Wang Xiaolu and Zhou Qiren, and the deputy heads were Zhu Jiaming, Lu Mai, Song Tingming and Gao Liang. Among them, Wang Xiaolu was responsible for basic theory, Zhou Qiren was responsible for agricultural economics, Zhu Jiaming was responsible for industrial economics, Lu Mai was responsible for finance and commerce, and Song Tingming and Gao Liang were responsible for macroeconomic system reform. Due to the large number of manuscripts, the number of reviewers was increased, and Zhang Shaojie, Jiang Yue, Xia Xiaolin, Gao Shangang and others participated in the review of manuscripts one after another.

By mid-August, the list of participants was finalized through the "selection of participants based on papers". In addition to the representatives selected based on papers, there were also some young and middle-aged scholars who initiated, organized and prepared the conference, as well as a few young and middle-aged scholars who had already achieved certain accomplishments. The two groups totaled 124 people. In addition, representatives from relevant central departments and Zhejiang Province were invited. The specially invited relevant central departments mainly included the Rural Policy Research Office of the Secretariat of the CCP Central Committee, the Research Office of the Secretariat of the CCP Central Committee, the Youth Cadre Bureau of the Organization Department of the CCP Central Committee, the Theoretical Bureau and the Propaganda and Education Bureau of the Propaganda Department of the CCP Central Committee, and the Secretariat of the Central Committee of the Communist Youth League. The conference specially invited leaders of the CCP Zhejiang Provincial Committee and the Zhejiang Provincial People's Government and relevant responsible persons to attend. Before the conference, the members of the conference preparatory group reported the conference preparation to the leaders of the CCP Zhejiang Provincial Committee and the Zhejiang Provincial People's Government and received their support. By the end of August, all preparatory work was completed.

== The conference ==
From September 3 to 10, 1984, the "Academic Symposium for Young and Middle-aged Economic Scientists" was held in Moganshan, Deqing County, Zhejiang Province.

On September 3, 1984, the “Academic Symposium of Young and Middle-aged Economic Scientists” was held in Moganshan No. 450 (Cathedral). The attendees included 124 authors and scholars of the above-mentioned papers, 8 representatives of relevant central ministries and commissions, 19 specially invited and observers from Zhejiang Province, plus members of the conference leadership group, representatives of the press, and relevant officials from Zhejiang Province, totaling more than 180 people.

Among the attendees were some personnel from relevant central and state departments, such as Wang Qishan from the Rural Policy Research Office of the Secretariat of the CCP Central Committee, Zuo Fang from the Research Office of the Secretariat of the CCP Central Committee, Jia Chunfeng from the Theoretical Bureau of the Propaganda Department of the CCP Central Committee, Yan Huai from the Youth Cadre Bureau of the Organization Department of the CCP Central Committee, and Li Yingtang from the General Office of the CCP Central Committee. Xue Ju, Deputy Secretary of the CCP Zhejiang Provincial Committee and Governor of Zhejiang Province, Luo Dong, Member of the Standing Committee of the Provincial Committee and Minister of Propaganda, and leaders from the Zhejiang Academy of Social Sciences, the Zhejiang Economic Research Center, and Zhejiang University also attended.

At the opening ceremony, representatives from the organizers, including Wang Ruisun, editor-in-chief of the Economic Weekly, and Jia Chunfeng, deputy director of the Theoretical Bureau of the Central Propaganda Department of the CCP Central Committee, delivered speeches. After the opening ceremony, all the conference delegates took a group photo.

During the meeting, a leading group was set up, which was composed of leaders of the initiating units. The leading group consisted of 11 people: An Gang, editor-in-chief of Economic Daily, Ding Wang, deputy editor-in-chief, Feng Lanrui, president of Economic Weekly, Wang Ruisun, editor-in-chief, Zhang Xuelian, deputy director of the Theoretical Department of the Central People's Broadcasting Station, Liu Yuren, head of Economic Efficiency News, Wang Wenqi, deputy editor-in-chief of China Youth, Bai Ruobing, editor-in-chief of China Rural and Township Industry Information News, Zhang Qi, director, Fang Minsheng, director of the Institute of Economics of Zhejiang Academy of Social Sciences, etc. Zhang Gang served as secretary-general, Liu Youcheng, Xu Jingan and Huang Jiangnan served as deputy secretaries-general, and Zhu Jiaming, Zhou Qiren and Wang Xiaolu were the main members.

Following the opening ceremony, the conference moved into a thematic discussion focusing on the central theme of urban economic system reform. During the preparatory phase in Beijing, the initial plan was to divide the participants into five groups (basic theory group, macroeconomic system reform group, industrial economy group, agricultural economy group, and fiscal, financial, and commercial economy group). Upon arrival in Moganshan, considering the larger number of attendees and the comprehensive and urgent nature of the reform, the number of thematic discussion groups was increased to seven, and their order was adjusted.

- The first group mainly discusses the strategic issue of price reform, a key aspect of economic system reform.
- The second group mainly discussed issues related to industrial management systems and enterprise vitality.
- The third group mainly discussed issues related to opening up the economy to the outside world;
- The fourth group mainly discussed the issue of leveraging the multifunctionality of central cities;
- The fifth group mainly discussed issues related to financial system reform;
- The sixth group mainly discussed the changes in rural industrial structure and the interface between rural economic system reform and urban economic system reform.
- The seventh group mainly discusses some basic theoretical issues related to economic system reform, such as commodity economy, ownership issues, government economic functions, etc.

At the meeting, no papers were read out, no empty talk was made, but rather each person expressed their views on the topic. The meeting also created new forms such as "discussion with plaques". During the meeting, the conference affairs group printed "Conference Situation" to exchange information among the groups. On September 8, 1984, the conference leadership group, the conveners of each group, and the conference secretariat held a meeting to summarize the previous stage of the meeting. Ding Wang, Feng Lanrui, Wang Ruisun, Zhang Qi, Fang Minsheng, Wang Wenqi, Zhang Xuelian of the conference leadership group, and Li Yingtang of the General Office of the CCP Central Committee spoke one after another.

=== Issues ===
==== The proposal of "combining deregulation and regulation" in price reform ====
There was no price group designed during the preparatory stage in Beijing. On September 9, 1984, Premier Zhao Ziyang of the State Council put forward three issues on economic system reform in his report to the Standing Committee of the Political Bureau of the CCP Central Committee, among which price reform was the top priority. This idea should have been brewing for a long time before the Moganshan Conference. The Moganshan Conference therefore faced the "decision-making needs" of price reform. The conference reached a consensus that "the price system must be reformed". At the conference, regarding the target model of price reform and its theoretical basis, one proposition was "taking planned prices as the main body" while "liberalizing some prices", and another proposition focused on emphasizing "introducing market mechanisms". The conference discussed the path of price reform in the most in-depth and heated debate, forming three opinions: one was "adjustment as the main body" (represented by Tian Yuan of the Price Research Center of the State Council ), the second was "liberalization as the main body" (represented by Zhang Weiying, a graduate student of the Department of Economics of Northwest University ), and the third was "adjustment and reform combined" (represented by Hua Sheng, He Jiacheng, and other graduate students of the Graduate School of the Chinese Academy of Social Sciences ). After the meeting, Xu Jing'an, deputy secretary-general of the meeting, wrote a report entitled "Two Approaches to Price Reform", pointing out that "the above two approaches have different focuses, but they are not mutually exclusive or contradictory. In the reform, 'adjustment' and 'liberalization' can be combined. What can be liberated should be liberated first, and what can be adjusted should be adjusted first. They can promote each other and complement each other." The meeting promoted the proposal of the dual-track price system reform approach in China.

==== Further expanding opening up to the outside world ====
This was the topic of the third group (Opening Up to the Outside World Group), held at Pastor's Villa No. 329. The first issue of the conference's "Conference Report" was a summary of the discussions in the third group (Opening Up to the Outside World Group), entitled "Promoting the Comprehensive Reform of China's Economic System by Taking the Coastal Open Zones as a Pioneer." The group leader was Zhu Jiaming, and members included Chen Shengshen, Chen Ping, and Cai Naizhong from Shanghai; Du Xia, Li Luoli, Jin Yanshi, Chang Xiuzhe, Hao Yisheng, and Yang Haitan from Tianjin; Zhang Xiangrong from Guangzhou; and Liang Xian from the Shekou Industrial Zone of China Merchants Group in Hong Kong. (Besides coastal cities, representatives from inland areas, such as Guo Fansheng from the Research Office of the CCP Inner Mongolia Autonomous Region Committee and Zhang Baotong from Shaanxi, also participated in the group discussions.) The focus of the discussion was how to further implement the strategy of expanding opening up, a response to Deng Xiaoping's proposal on further opening up during the Spring Festival of 1984. One key issue was the opening-up strategy for the coastal areas, with participants proposing suggestions to create an organic structure and system in the coastal areas that combines division of labor with interconnectedness. Second, the reform of coastal open cities. The participants unanimously agreed that as the forefront of China's strategic development, coastal open cities need to establish a new economic system. The reform of coastal open cities may become the breakthrough point of national reform. It is necessary to explore new reform paths in "overall regional reform" and "overall partial reform". Third, the issue of coordinated development between the opening up of coastal areas and the inland areas. Chen Shengshen and others in Shanghai emphasized the role of coastal areas in attracting foreign investment. Guo Fansheng challenged the "gradient shift" theory of the economic community. Based on the above discussions, Zhu Jiaming wrote a special report stating that coastal areas should open up to the outside world, and the inland areas should also open up to the outside world. The state needs to take overall consideration.

==== State-owned enterprise reform ====
When selecting topics, the organizers believed that price reform and opening up to the outside world required a micro-foundation, and state-owned enterprises (later called state-owned enterprises) must become market entities that "bear their own profits and losses". The discussion focused on three aspects: first, the basic direction and starting point of state-owned enterprise reform; second, the two reform methods of "profit retention" and "shareholding system"; and third, the issue of state-owned enterprise bankruptcy.

==== Financial system reform ====
The group included a number of financial experts, including Cai Chongzhi, Liu Yu, and Qi Yonggui from the Financial Research Institute of the People's Bank of China, Xiao Fan from the Department of Economics of Wuhan University, and Shen Shuigen from Shenzhen International Trust and Investment Company. On September 4, the group discussed the "basic path of China's economic system reform" from a macro perspective. On September 5, Cai Chongzhi presided over a discussion on "what are the most urgent requirements of China's economic system reform and commodity production for finance", "what kind of financial system should China establish", and "what are the main aspects of current financial reform". On September 6, Shen Shuigen presided over a discussion on "regional financial centers" and "opening up financial markets". On September 7, Xiao Fan presided over a discussion on "shareholding economy" caused by opening up financial markets (capital markets). The participants were very enthusiastic about financial system reform, especially banking system reform and stock issuance. This was one of the most sensitive topics touched upon at the meeting.

==== Rural reform and development ====
The China Rural Development Research Group and the Rural Policy Research Office of the Secretariat of the CCP Central Committee were the main forces, with representatives including Wang Qishan, Chen Yizi, Zhou Qiren, Pei Changhong, Bai Nansheng, and Zuo Fang participating. First, they judged the overall situation of rural reform and development, believing that the reforms over the past few years had, on the one hand, put forward new tasks of deepening the reform of the rural economic system and comprehensively reorganizing the rural industrial structure, and on the other hand, prepared the conditions for completing the task. They needed to put forward ideas and solutions that could be used as a reference for decision-making based on systematic investigation and research (the group raised the issue of "decision-making reference" from the beginning). Second, the reform of the purchase and sale system of agricultural products (first of all, grain). Third, the transformation of the rural industrial structure. The results of the discussion were written by Wang Qishan and Zhou Qiren into a report entitled "Reform of Grain Purchase and Sale System and Rural Industrial Structure", which was submitted to the Central Committee. Three months later, the No. 1 document of the Central Committee in 1985 proposed "the second step of the reform of the unified purchase and sale system of agricultural products in rural areas".

==== Other topics ====
The meeting discussed the functions of the central city, the economic functions of the government, and the basic theoretical issues of socialism discussed by the basic theory group. At the meeting, Yao Xianguo from the Department of Economics of Zhejiang University submitted a paper entitled "The Dual Nature of Socialist Labor Fund and China's Wage Reform", but no special group discussion was set up at the meeting.

== Influence ==
=== Provide reform ideas and strategies ===
Following the meeting, Xu Jing'an, Zhu Jiaming, Wang Qishan, Huang Jiangnan, Zhou Qiren, and others were responsible for drafting special reports to be presented to higher authorities. Young scholars such as Du Xia, Cai Chongzhi, Tian Yuan, Hua Sheng, Jiang Yue, and Liu Yu participated in drafting (or outline writing). By September 15, eight special reports were completed: "Two Approaches to Price Reform," "Several Issues Related to Price Reform" (with two appendices), "Suggestions on Coastal Cities Open to the Outside World," "Implementing Self-Responsibility for Profits and Losses Should Start with Small Enterprises and Collective Enterprises" (here, "small enterprises" refers to state-owned small enterprises), "Several Opinions on Financial System Reform," "Several Issues in the Development and Management of the Shareholding Economy," "Reforming the Grain Purchase and Sale System and Rural Industrial Structure," and "On the Economic Functions of the Chinese Government at the Present Stage." After the eight special reports were completed, representatives were sent to report to Zhang Jingfu, State Councilor in charge of the State Planning Commission and the State Commission for Restructuring the Economic System. On September 20, Zhang Jingfu wrote an instruction: "The 'two approaches to price reform' proposed at the discussion meeting of young and middle-aged economic workers are of great reference value." On October 10, Premier Zhao Ziyang of the State Council wrote an instruction: "'Two approaches to price reform' are very enlightening. The main topic is how to combine deregulation and regulation and apply them flexibly; to guide the situation and avoid major shocks while solving problems. Guangdong's approach of reforming the price management system, the path taken by township enterprises in Jiangsu, the decline in cooperative coal prices, and the result of large-scale over-purchase of grain, cotton and oil leading to proportional prices are all successful examples of combining deregulation and regulation."

The Third Plenary Session of the 12th CCP Central Committee held in October 1984 proposed that "the reform of the price system is the key to the success or failure of the entire economic system reform." The dual-track price system achievement of the Moganshan Conference was adopted by the state as a policy, and Hua Sheng, He Jiacheng and other representatives of the dual-track price system were rated as experts with outstanding contributions at the national level.

=== Deepening theoretical research on economic reform ===
Shortly after the conference, the *Economic Daily* published 18 theoretical papers presented in five special sections titled "Exploring Theoretical Issues in Economic Reform—Excerpts from Papers of the Academic Symposium for Young and Middle-Aged Economic Scientists." Two papers were selected for publication on September 25: Guo Zhenying 's "Self-Responsibility for Profits and Losses and Enterprise Power Expansion" and Wu Ke 's "Comprehensive Application of Various Economic Leverages in Planned Management." Four papers were selected for publication on September 28: Chang Xiuzhe 's "Inspirations from the Development of the Shekou Industrial Zone, " Guo Fansheng 's "On the Gradual Progression of Technology," Xia Yulong, Tan Dajun, Chen Ping, and Cai Naizhong 's "The Strategic Position of Coastal Open Zones," and Lu Ding and Zhang Yining 's "What is the Attraction for Foreign Investment?" Three papers were selected for publication on September 29: Zhou Xiaochuan, Lou Jiwei, and Li Jiange 's "Price Reform Does Not Need to Increase the Fiscal Burden," Zhang Weiying 's "Price System Reform is the Central Link of Reform," and Tian Yuan and Chen Dezun 's "On the Thinking of Price Reform." On October 4, three articles were selected: Zhang Baotong 's "The Contract System is Suitable for the Current Productivity Status", Zhang Taiping 's "Rural Family Economy and Its Development Trend", and Wang Changyuan 's "The Trend of County-level Economic Management System Reform". On October 11, six articles were selected: Hao Yisheng and Du Xia 's "Improving the Industrial Allocation of Coastal Open Cities", Xia Yulong et al.'s "Learning from the Special Economic Zone Model to Develop Emerging Industries", Zhu Jiaming and He Weiwen 's "Introducing Advanced Technology and Protecting National Industries", Jin Yanshi 's "Inland Resource Development and Coastal Opening-up", Shen Shuigen 's "Opening-up and the Reform of the RMB Exchange System", and Li Hong and Cai Chongzhi 's "Establishing China's Financial Center". Other newspapers and periodicals also published the conference results. These published conference results involved theoretical issues of reform and development, and after publication, they triggered research on other issues, and in the research, they began to introduce Western economic elements. Many young economists published articles, forming a wave of in-depth academic research by young and middle-aged economists in the mid-to-late 1980s, and had an impact on Chinese economic research from the 1990s to the early 21st century.

=== Promoting the growth of economists ===
A number of young and middle-aged economists emerged at the meeting and received attention from the central leaders, who held discussions with them. After the meeting, a number of young and middle-aged people entered government departments (such as Tian Yuan, who served as a member of the State Commission for Restructuring the Economic System ). The State Commission for Restructuring the Economic System also established the China Institute for Economic System Reform, which recruited participants. For example, Zhang Weiying joined the institute after graduating from Northwest University.

Local governments also attach importance to the role of young and middle-aged scholars. After the meeting, Liu Jie, secretary of the Henan Provincial Committee of the Chinese Communist Party, and He Zhukang, governor of Henan Province, went to Beijing to invite key members of the Moganshan Conference to form a Henan Consulting Group. Members included Wang Qishan, Zhu Jiaming, Huang Jiangnan, and others. In addition, as soon as the meeting ended, the Shanghai Municipal Committee of the Chinese Communist Party and the Shanghai Municipal People's Government commissioned the Economic Daily to form the "Shanghai Economic Engineering Group" to study the strategy for the revitalization and development of Shanghai. Municipalities such as Beijing and Tianjin and relevant provinces have also successively established young and middle-aged economic societies.

As agreed upon at the meeting, the journal "Young and Middle-Aged Economic Forum," founded by young and middle-aged scholars, was launched in Tianjin in April 1985, marking the establishment of an academic platform for young and middle-aged economists in China. This journal was essentially a non-governmental academic publication, centered in Beijing, Tianjin, and Shanghai, and bringing together young and middle-aged economists from across the country. The first editorial board consisted of 36 young and middle-aged scholars, with Ding Wang as editor-in-chief and Wang Xiaolu, Xing Yuanmin, Chen Shenshen, Jin Guantao, and Hao Yisheng as deputy editors -in-chief. 24 of the members were participants in the Moganshan Conference, including Ding Wang, Wang Xiaolu, Lu Jian, Tian Yuan, Liu An, Liu Youcheng, Qiao Tongfeng, Zhu Jiaming, Li Luoli, Du Xia, Yang Mu, Chen Yizi, Chen Shenshen, Chen Weishu, Zhou Tianbao, Zhou Qiren, Jin Yanshi, Jin Guantao, Zhang Gang, Hao Yisheng, Guo Fansheng, Huang Jiangnan, Chang Xiuzhe, and Cai Chongzhi. The other 12 were not participants in the Moganshan Conference, including Wang Luolin, Wang Zhan, Zuo Zhi, Xing Yuanmin, Sun Hengzhi, Liu Jinglin, Zhu Min, Wu Jixue, Luo Baoming, Yao Lin, Zhang Chaozhong, and Gao Tiesheng.

In 1986, the editorial board was adjusted, and Zhu Jiaming was appointed as the editor-in-chief. Luo Baoming and Huang Jiangnan were added as deputy editors-in-chief. In addition, 13 people were added as editorial board members, including Sun Xian, Zhu Xiaoping, Wu Xiaoying, Hua Sheng, He Ling, Yang Xiaokai, Chen Qiwei, Zhang Xiangrong, Zhang Wei, Zhang Siping, Xu Jingan, Yuan Zhongyin, and San Xiangjun. Among them, Hua Sheng, Zhang Xiangrong, and Xu Jingan were participants in the Moganshan Conference. The journal became one of the most influential economic theory journals at that time.

== The second conference ==
In 1985, the Second Academic Symposium for Young and Middle-Aged Economic Scientists was held in Tianjin. The two group leaders of the paper review panel, Chang Xiuzhe and Jin Yanshi, along with more than ten young scholars, selected 125 authors from 2,615 papers. More than 30 of these authors were participants in the Moganshan Conference. They were Ma Kai, Tian Yuan, Bei Duoguang, Lu Jian, Sun Hongwu, Liu An, Zhu Jiaming, Hua Sheng, Li Kehua, Li Luoli, Li Jiange, Li Xiaoxi, Du Xia, Shi Zhengxin, He Jiacheng, Chen Shengshen, Chen Xiaomei, Zhou Qiren, Zhang Gang, Zhang Shaojie, Zhang Xiangrong, Zhang Baotong, Zhang Weiying, Zhou Xiaochuan, Jin Yanshi, Hao Yisheng, Yang Haitian, Guo Fansheng, Gao Liang, Xia Xiaolin, Xu Jingan, Liang Zhisen, Huang Weide, Chang Xiuzhe, Jiang Yue, Lou Jiwei, and Cai Chongzhi. Other nominees who did not attend the Moganshan Conference are Ma Biao, Ma Jiantang, Wang Zhan, Feng Lun, Liu Wei, Zhu Min, Lu Zhongyuan, Song Guoqing, Li Jiangfan, Li Weisen (i.e. Wei Sen ), Shen Jiru, Wu Xiaoqiu, Zhuo Yongliang, Hong Yinxing, Chen Qiwei, Tang Jie, Guo Zhenying, Guo Shuqing, etc.

Except for a few individuals, the authors of the selected papers all participated in the "Second Academic Symposium for Young and Middle-aged Economic Scientists" held in Tianjin, and their papers were included in the collection of papers "The Idea of Takeoff".

The Moganshan Conference and the Bashan Conference put forward ideas and methods for China's economic reform. Due to the non-governmental and spontaneous nature of these two conferences, the ideas were more active and the methods were more targeted. The Moganshan Conference and the Bashan Conference can be said to have pioneered the development of modern think tanks in China.

== Commemoration ==
On June 21, 2014, in order to commemorate the 30th anniversary of the Moganshan Conference, Sohu Finance, the Humanities and Economics Society, and the National School of Development of Peking University held the “Moganshan: Innovation and Momentum of 1984 - 2014 Sohu Finance Summer Summit”.

From September 24 to 26, 2016, the Fifth Forum on Reform and Opening Up for Young and Middle-aged People (New Moganshan Conference 2016) was held at the Luhuadang Hotel in Moganshan. The organizers were the Beijing Forum on Reform and Innovation for Young and Middle-aged People, China Minsheng Bank Research Institute, Guohe Modern Capital Research Institute, Suzhou Bank, Huaxia New Supply Economics Research Institute, and China and Globalization Think Tank. The supporting unit was the International Cooperation Center of the National Development and Reform Commission.

From September 15 to 17, 2017, the “New Moganshan Conference 2017” was held in Moganshan. The guiding unit was the International Cooperation Center of the National Development and Reform Commission, and the organizers were the Beijing Young and Middle-aged Reform and Innovation Forum and the Youth Federation of the Chinese Academy of Sciences.

=== Moganshan Conference Site ===
The Moganshan Conference Site is located at No. 450 Moganshan. Built in 1923, it was originally the largest church on Moganshan, the Assembly Hall. The Moganshan Conference Site is now open to the public as a tourist attraction.

== See also ==
- Bashan Conference
