= Bashan Conference =

The Bashan Conference was an international symposium on macroeconomic management held in September 1985 aboard the ship Bashan in China. It promoted the process of China's reform and opening up.

== Background ==
After China's reform and opening up, in the economic system reform since the end of 1978, rural reform was the first to achieve great success. By the mid-1980s, the reform was shifting from rural-focused reform to comprehensive urban-focused reform. The focus of urban reform was the reform of state-owned enterprises and the revitalization of the micro-economy. This required touching the core of the planned economy, namely the physical command plan, from the relationship between the macro-economy and the micro-economy, and put forward new requirements for macro-control. However, until the mid-1980s, China's economic decision-makers (then called economic workers) and economists (then called economic theorists) were still very unfamiliar with the operation and regulation of the market economy and the way of shifting from a planned economy to a market economy.

At the end of 1978, the third plenary session of the 11th Central Committee of the Chinese Communist Party emphasized the development of commodity production and the greater role of the law of value (or market mechanism) in economic life. In the spring of 1979, a discussion meeting on the law of value was held in Wuxi, which continued to emphasize this point. However, the economic decision-makers and economists at that time did not break out of the framework of the planned economy and were still exploring how to strengthen the role of the market mechanism in the planned economy. The 12th CCP National Congress held in the autumn of 1982 insisted on "planned economy as the mainstay and market regulation as the supplement". However, in October 1984, the third plenary session of the 12th CCP Central Committee passed the "Decision of the CCP Central Committee on Economic System Reform", which put forward the reform direction of " planned commodity economy ". This was a key step taken by China in the process of transitioning from a planned economy to a market economy. Although this was different in expression from the "state regulates the market and the market guides enterprises" proposed by the 13th CCP National Congress in 1987 and the socialist market economy proposed by the 14th CCP National Congress in 1992.

The third plenary session of the 12th CCP Central Committee also proposed the goal of "doubling" the total output value of industry and agriculture by the end of the 20th century. Under these circumstances, the enthusiasm for reform and development was high throughout the country. Various places demanded to expand the scale of investment and competed with each other in raising wages and bonuses. In terms of finance, separate kitchens were implemented, and in terms of currency and credit, expansionary policies were implemented. This trend began in the second half of 1984. By the beginning of 1985, the country had seen a situation of double expansion of investment and consumption, which was mainly manifested in the increased inflationary pressure, which was not conducive to the next step of reform and development.

In his opening remarks at the Bashan Round Conference, Xue Muqiao said: “To revitalize the micro-economy, we must strengthen the control of the macro-economy. We are not yet good at strengthening macro-management, so many loopholes have emerged after the micro-economy has been loosened. From the fourth quarter of last year to the first quarter of this year, there were instances of bank credit funds and consumer funds going out of control, which has added difficulties to this year’s economic system reform… Preventing the consumer funds from going out of control, especially preventing credit from going out of control due to the excessive scale of basic construction, is a major problem in China’s current macro-control.” An article provided by Liu Guoguang, vice president of the Chinese Academy of Social Sciences, and Zhao Renwei for the Bashan Round Conference summarized the background of the economic overheating from 1984 to 1985 as follows: “(1) The economic growth rate was too fast. In 1984, the economic growth rate increased to 1412%, and in the first half of 1985…” The total industrial output value increased by 2311% year-on-year. (2) The situation of investment expansion and consumption expansion intensified. In 1984, fixed asset investment increased by 2118%, and bank cash expenditure on wages and bonuses increased by 2213%, which was much higher than the growth rate of national income of 12%. (3) Credit and money supply were excessive. In 1984, the total amount of bank loans increased by 2819%, and the money supply increased accordingly. In his summary of the Bashan Lun Conference, Lin Chonggeng also summarized the overheated economic situation at that time: "(1) Credit was excessively expanded, and there was a shortage and tension in important raw materials, energy and transportation, which led to a huge gap between the state-stipulated prices and market prices in many cases. (2) The balance of payments deteriorated sharply. (3) The spiral rise of wages and prices led to increased inflationary pressure."

== The conference ==
Against this backdrop, Lin Chonggeng (a Filipino of Chinese descent), the World Bank’s chief representative in China, and Liao Jili, a member of the State Commission for Restructuring the Economic System of China, began to discuss organizing an “International Symposium on Macroeconomic Management” to discuss the macroeconomic management of China's economy.

On 2 September 1985, the “International Symposium on Macroeconomic Management”, which lasted for six days, was held on the Bashan ship sailing on the Yangtze River. The symposium was approved by the State Council of China and jointly convened by the China Society for Economic System Reform, the Chinese Academy of Social Sciences and the World Bank. The meeting started on 2 September 1985, when the Bashan ship set sail from Chongqing, and ended on 7 September when it arrived in Wuhan, lasting six days. This was an important meeting held during the turning point of China's reform and opening up. The meeting invited more than 60 Chinese and foreign economists and officials to participate. The participants reached a lot of consensus on China's economic transition and macroeconomic management reform, which promoted the process of China's reform and opening up.

The foreign experts attending the meeting were invited by Lin Chonggeng of the World Bank. These experts included:

- Alexander Cairncross (former President of the Royal Economic Society and Honorary Chancellor of the University of Glasgow)
- Aleksander Bajt (Member of the executive committee on Economic Reforms of the Government of Yugoslavia)
- James Tobin (Professor of Economics at Yale University, winner of the 1981 Nobel Prize in Economics)
- János Kornai (Director of the Research Department, Institute of Economics, Hungarian Academy of Sciences)
- Leroy Jones (Professor at Boston University)
- Michel Albert (French insurance company)
- Otmar Emminger (Chairman of Wiesbaden Securities Mortgage Bank, West Germany)
- Włodzimierz Brus (Senior Research Fellow, Anselney College, University of Oxford, United Kingdom)
- World Bank representatives Lin Chonggeng and Adrian Wood
- Representative present: Minoru Kobayashi (Director of the Industrial Bank of Japan)

The domestic experts attending the meeting were mainly economic workers from government decision-making departments and economic theorists from research departments. They included An Zhiwen, Secretary of the Party Group of the State Commission for Restructuring the Economic System; Xue Muqiao, Director-General of the Economic Research Center of the State Council; Ma Hong, Director-General of the Technical Economic Research Center of the State Council; Liu Guoguang, Vice President of the Chinese Academy of Social Sciences; as well as Gao Shangquan, Yang Qixian, Tong Dalin, Hong Hu, Wu Jinglian, Zhao Renwei, Zhang Zhuoyuan, Zhou Shulian, Chen Jiyuan, Dai Yuanchen, Gong Zhuoming, Xiang Huaicheng, Wang Zhuo, Tian Yuan, Wu Kaitai, Li Kemu, Guo Shuqing, Lou Jiwei, He Jiacheng, Li Zhenning, etc.

Prior to the meeting, on 31 August 1985, Premier Zhao Ziyang met with foreign economists and some Chinese economists who were about to board the ship at Zhongnanhai. He stated that China's economic reform goals remained steadfast; a complete market system, including commodity markets, financial markets, and labor markets, should be gradually established; and economic, legal, and necessary administrative means should be used to regulate and control the macroeconomy.

The main issues discussed at the Bashan Lun Conference included:

- (1) The goal of economic system reform: Professor Kornai proposed two coordination mechanisms (I and II) for the target model of reform, each of which has two specific forms (A and B). He believed that the truly effective reform should take the market coordination of macro-control (IIB) as the target model. Most of the participants followed Professor Kornai's division in the discussion and agreed in principle to take the IIB model as the reform target. Bruce believed that the starting point of China's economic reform was not IA (direct administrative coordination), or even only half of IA.
- (2) The dual system under the mode of system transformation and the gradual mode: The meeting reviewed the achievements of the Moganshan Conference - the dual-track pricing system. Bruce praised the dual-track pricing system as "a beneficial invention and a bridge from the old system to the new system". The participants believed that the implementation of the dual-track transition was to avoid a major shock during the reform, but the coexistence of the dual systems would inevitably bring friction and disorder. Therefore, the situation of the coexistence of the dual systems could not last too long.
- (3) The main means of indirect regulation include fiscal policy, monetary policy, income policy and balance of payments.
- (4) Important conditions for implementing indirect regulation: including hardening the budget constraints of enterprises, cultivating the market system, actively and decisively carrying out price reforms, implementing diversified ownership, and establishing and improving the economic information and economic supervision system.

The meeting produced seven special reports: “Target Model and Transition Steps”, “Fiscal Policy and Macroeconomic Management”, “Monetary Policy and Financial System Reform”, “Income Policy and Macroeconomic Management”, “Economic Growth and Investment Issues”, “Inflation and Price Issues”, and “An Important Prerequisite for Achieving the Indirect Control Target of Macroeconomics”. The Bashan Conference drafted the “Report on the Main Situation of the Bashan Conference” and submitted it to the State Council. On 23 September of the same year, the proposal for the Seventh Five-Year Plan adopted by the National Congress of the Chinese Communist Party hina incorporated the results of the Bashan Conference.

The Moganshan Conference and the Bashan Conference put forward ideas and methods for China's economic reform. Due to the non-governmental and spontaneous nature of these two conferences, the ideas were more active and the methods were more targeted. The Moganshan Conference and the Bashan Conference can be said to have pioneered the development of modern think tanks in China.

== Commemoration ==
From 28 to 29 October 2017, the “China Economic and International Cooperation Annual Conference and New ‘Bashan Wheel’ Conference 2017 – China and the World after the 19th CCP National Congress” was held at Renmin University of China in Beijing.

== See also ==
- Moganshan Conference
