= Wubu County =

Wubu County 吴堡县 Wupu
- County
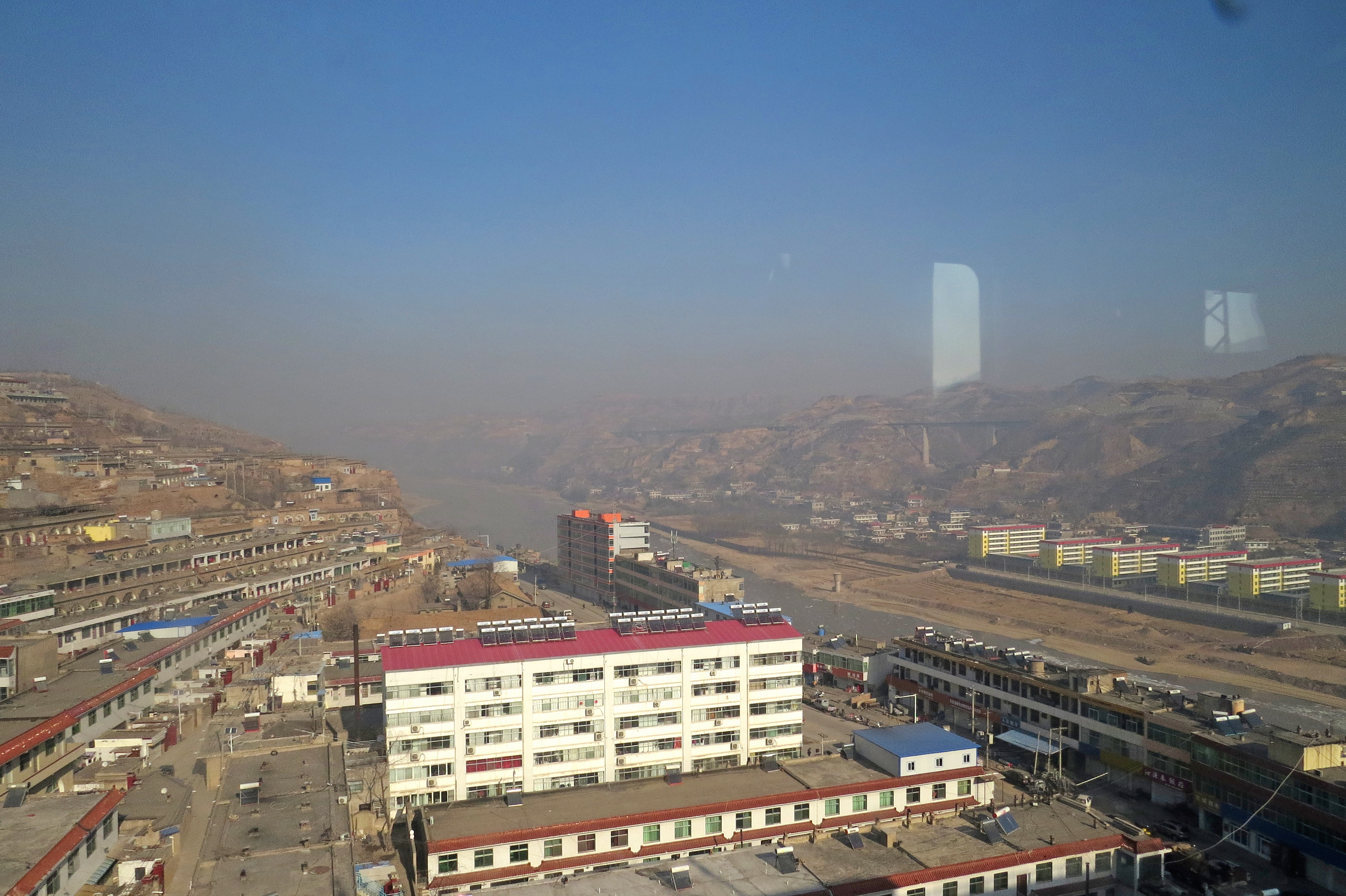

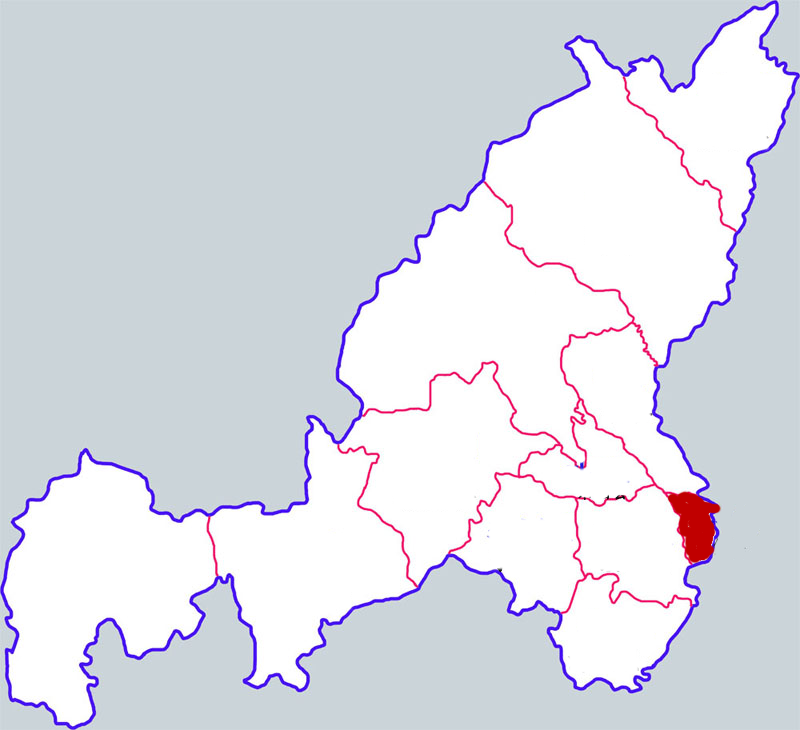
- Wubu in Yulin

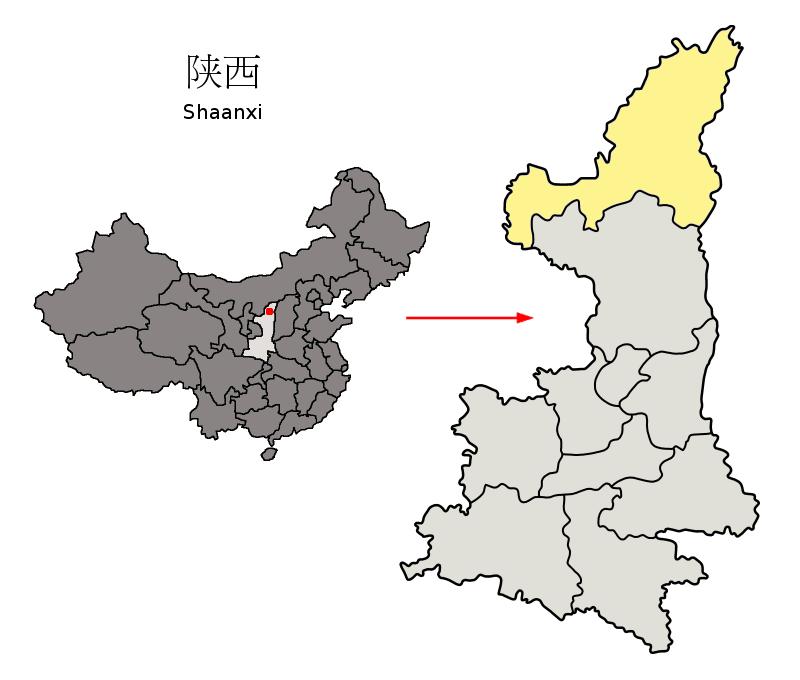
- Yulin in Shaanxi
- Coordinates: 37°27′07″N 110°44′24″E
- Country: People's Republic of China
- Province: Shaanxi
- Prefecture-level city: Yulin
- County seat: Songjiachuan (宋家川镇)

Area
  - Total: 420.85 km^{2} (162.49 sq mi)

Population (2019)
  - Total: 64,900
  - Density: 154/km^{2} (399/sq mi)
- Time zone: UTC+8 (China Standard)
- Postal code: 718200
- Area code: 0912
- Website: www.wubu.gov.cn

Wubu County (simplified Chinese: 吴堡县; traditional Chinese: 吳堡縣; pinyin: Wúbǔ Xiàn) is located in the southeastern corner of Yulin City, in the north of Shaanxi Province, China, and on the western bank of the Yellow River. On the opposite bank is Liulin County, in Shanxi province; it also borders Jia County and Suide County. The typical landscape within the county is loess plateau and drought often hovers in the area, creating serious soil erosion.

== Overview ==
Wubu County is located 176 kilometres (109 mi) from central Yulin, 260 kilometres (160 mi) from Yan'an, and 628 kilometres (390 mi) from the capital of the province, Xi'an. With an area of 418.5 square kilometres (161.6 mi^{2}), it is the smallest county in northern Shaanxi.

- Population: 80,000 (2002)
- Code: 610829
- Postal code: 718200
- Government location: Songjiachuan Town
- Administrative divisions: four towns and four townships
- Towns: Songjiachuan, Koujiayuan, Guojiagou, Xinjiagou
- Township: Xuexiacun, Chakou, Gongjiawan, Zhangjiashan

== History ==
The area was used by Helian Bobo to detain people loyal to Liu Yu and his Southern dynasty. Its former name was Wu'erbu (吴儿堡).

During the Northern Han dynasty, a hilltop stone city was built in Wubu. Some buildings from the Ming and Qing dynasties are still preserved. Due to the difficulty of supplying water to the hill, most residents now live in the new town at the foot of the hill.

Wubu was part of the Shaan-Gan-Ning Border Area during the Second Sino-Japanese War and Chinese Civil War.

== Administrative divisions ==
As of 2019, Wubu County comprises one subdistrict and five towns.

=== Subdistricts ===
- Songjiachuan Subdistrict (宋家川街道)

=== Towns ===
- Xinjiagou (辛家沟镇)
- Guojiagou (郭家沟镇)
- Koujiayuan (寇家塬镇)
- Chashang (岔上镇)
- Zhangjiashan (张家山镇)

== Climate ==
Wubu exhibits a semi-arid climate (Köppen: BSk)

Climate data for Wubu, elevation 744 m (2,441 ft), (2007–2020 normals, extremes 1981–2010)
Month	Jan	Feb	Mar	Apr	May	Jun	Jul	Aug	Sep	Oct	Nov	Dec	Year
Record high °C (°F)	12.0 (53.6)	21.4 (70.5)	31.0 (87.8)	38.5 (101.3)	38.4 (101.1)	42.8 (109.0)	41.5 (106.7)	40.0 (104.0)	39.2 (102.6)	30.8 (87.4)	22.7 (72.9)	15.3 (59.5)	42.8 (109.0)
Mean daily maximum °C (°F)	1.3 (34.3)	6.7 (44.1)	14.7 (58.5)	21.8 (71.2)	27.4 (81.3)	31.1 (88.0)	31.9 (89.4)	29.9 (85.8)	24.4 (75.9)	18.4 (65.1)	10.1 (50.2)	2.6 (36.7)	18.4 (65.0)
Daily mean °C (°F)	−5.5 (22.1)	−0.7 (30.7)	7.1 (44.8)	14.4 (57.9)	20.0 (68.0)	24.3 (75.7)	25.6 (78.1)	23.8 (74.8)	18.2 (64.8)	11.5 (52.7)	3.6 (38.5)	−3.9 (25.0)	11.5 (52.8)
Mean daily minimum °C (°F)	−10.2 (13.6)	−5.9 (21.4)	0.9 (33.6)	7.6 (45.7)	13.0 (55.4)	17.9 (64.2)	20.5 (68.9)	19.1 (66.4)	13.8 (56.8)	6.8 (44.2)	−0.7 (30.7)	−8.1 (17.4)	6.2 (43.2)
Record low °C (°F)	−20.7 (−5.3)	−17.5 (0.5)	−13.1 (8.4)	−3.1 (26.4)	1.4 (34.5)	9.4 (48.9)	15.3 (59.5)	11.5 (52.7)	2.1 (35.8)	−5.4 (22.3)	−16.7 (1.9)	−20.3 (−4.5)	−20.7 (−5.3)
Average precipitation mm (inches)	4.1 (0.16)	6.2 (0.24)	11.9 (0.47)	24.9 (0.98)	33.4 (1.31)	49.9 (1.96)	109.0 (4.29)	113.1 (4.45)	75.3 (2.96)	34.8 (1.37)	16.1 (0.63)	3.2 (0.13)	481.9 (18.95)
Average precipitation days (≥ 0.1 mm)	2.4	2.8	4.1	5.5	6.6	8.9	11.5	10.7	8.9	6.9	4.3	2.0	74.6
Average snowy days	3.0	2.8	1.4	0.2	0	0	0	0	0	0.2	1.6	2.5	11.7
Average relative humidity (%)	58	52	44	40	42	49	62	68	70	68	64	59	56
Mean monthly sunshine hours	187.4	184.4	225.0	250.1	275.1	265.2	245.6	229.6	195.0	195.9	180.0	185.6	2,618.9
Percentage possible sunshine	61	60	60	63	62	60	55	55	53	57	60	63	59
Source: China Meteorological Administration

== Economy ==
Wubu is an impoverished county. Large scale, high-quality coal deposits were discovered in 2005; these remain to be exploited. Other natural resources include coal-derived gas, fluorite and phosphates. China National Highway 307 and the Tai-Zhong railway pass through the territory. Local specialities include red dates and silkworms.

== Notable people ==
- Liu Qing, writer
- Zhang Weiying, economist
