= Dual-track price system =

Price system in China

The dual-track price system (Chinese: 价格双轨制; pinyin: Jiàgé shuāngguǐzhì) was a price system used in the early stages of China's reform and opening up in the 1980s to transition from a planned price system to a market based one. Under the dual-track price system, a commodity had a fixed price within the national planned economic indicators and adopted a price that is freely adjusted according to the market supply and demand mechanism outside the planned economic indicators.

== Background ==
The dual-track price system refers to a system where the prices of means of production are divided into two categories: "within the plan" and "outside the plan." Products produced by enterprises within the scope of the state-planned production quota are sold at the state-stipulated "within the plan" price, while those exceeding the planned production quota can be sold at the "outside the plan" market price. Due to shortages of many means of production at the time, "outside the plan" prices were generally higher than "within the plan" prices. The state hoped to gradually transition the entire economy from a planned economy to a market economy by gradually reducing the scope of mandatory planning.

== History ==
In May 1984, the State Council promulgated the Provisional Regulations on Further Expanding the Autonomy of State-Owned Industrial Enterprises, which stipulated that industrial production materials, including the surplus production after fulfilling the national plan and the portion sold by the enterprises themselves, could generally be priced within 20% higher or lower than the state-set price. Enterprises had the right to set their own prices or negotiate prices between the supply and demand sides (the 20% limit was abolished in January 1985). The "dual-track price system" for production materials was affirmed and widely promoted as an important reform measure for the reform of production material prices.

The summer of 1984 saw intensive debate about the future of economic reform in China. Premier Zhao Ziyang identified price reform as a key area of future reform. By this time, the urban consumer price index was artificially low, with the government spending over 20% of its budget on subsidies, mainly for daily necessities. In late August 1984, Hungary's deputy prime minister József Marjai visited China, where he said Hungary's most important error had been not taking advantage of the period of rapid growth during the early part of its reform process to implement price reform. Zhao used Marjai's quote to say "right now China is in a golden period for price reform". In September 1984, a group of young economists held a conference at the Moganshan resort in Zhejiang to discuss price reform; economists at the Price Research Center proposed, while another group of economists including Zhou Xiaochuan and Lou Jiwei a series of small but swift recalculations of prices. Economist Zhang Weiying called for prices determined by supply and demand. After a heated debate, the participants outlined what would become known as the dual-track price system. In March 1985, the State Council officially issued a document abolishing price controls on non-planned means of production, and the dual-track price system officially became the basic policy of China's price reform. Zhao instructed the Material Supply Bureau to hold constant the size of the central plan, which laid the groundwork for the system to produce sustained increases to output outside the plan.

In 1988, Deng Xiaoping wanted to move away from the dual-track system to the market deciding prices. On 9 November 1989, the fifth plenary session of the 13th CCP Central Committee adopted the "Decision of the CPC Central Committee on Further Rectification and Deepening Reform," which proposed to "gradually resolve the problem of the 'dual-track' price system for means of production" and "transform the 'dual-track' system into a 'single-track' system," that is, to "merge the two tracks into one," thus establishing a new market-oriented approach to price reform.
