= Xue Muqiao =

Chinese economist and politician (1904–2005)

- 薛暮桥
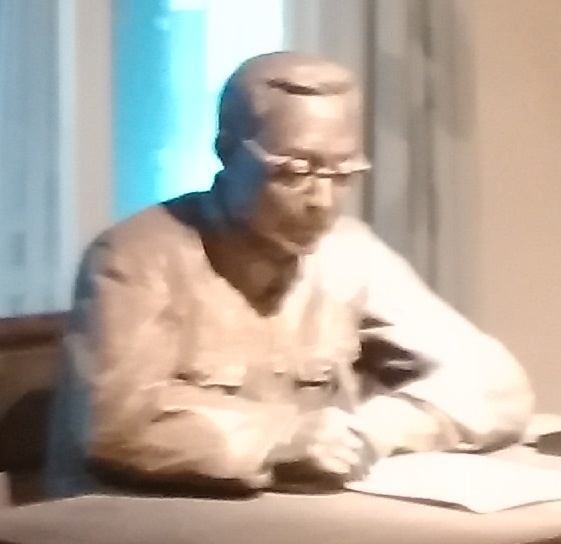

Deputy Secretary of the Central Commission for Discipline Inspection
- In office November 1949 – 31 March 1955 Serving with Wang Congwu, An Ziwen, Qiang Ying, Liu Lantao, Xie Juezai, Li Baohua, Liu Jingfan, Liang Hua & Feng Naichao

Personal details
- Born: 25 October 1904 Wuxi, Jiangsu, Qing China
- Died: 22 July 2005 (aged 100) Beijing, China
- Party: Chinese Communist Party

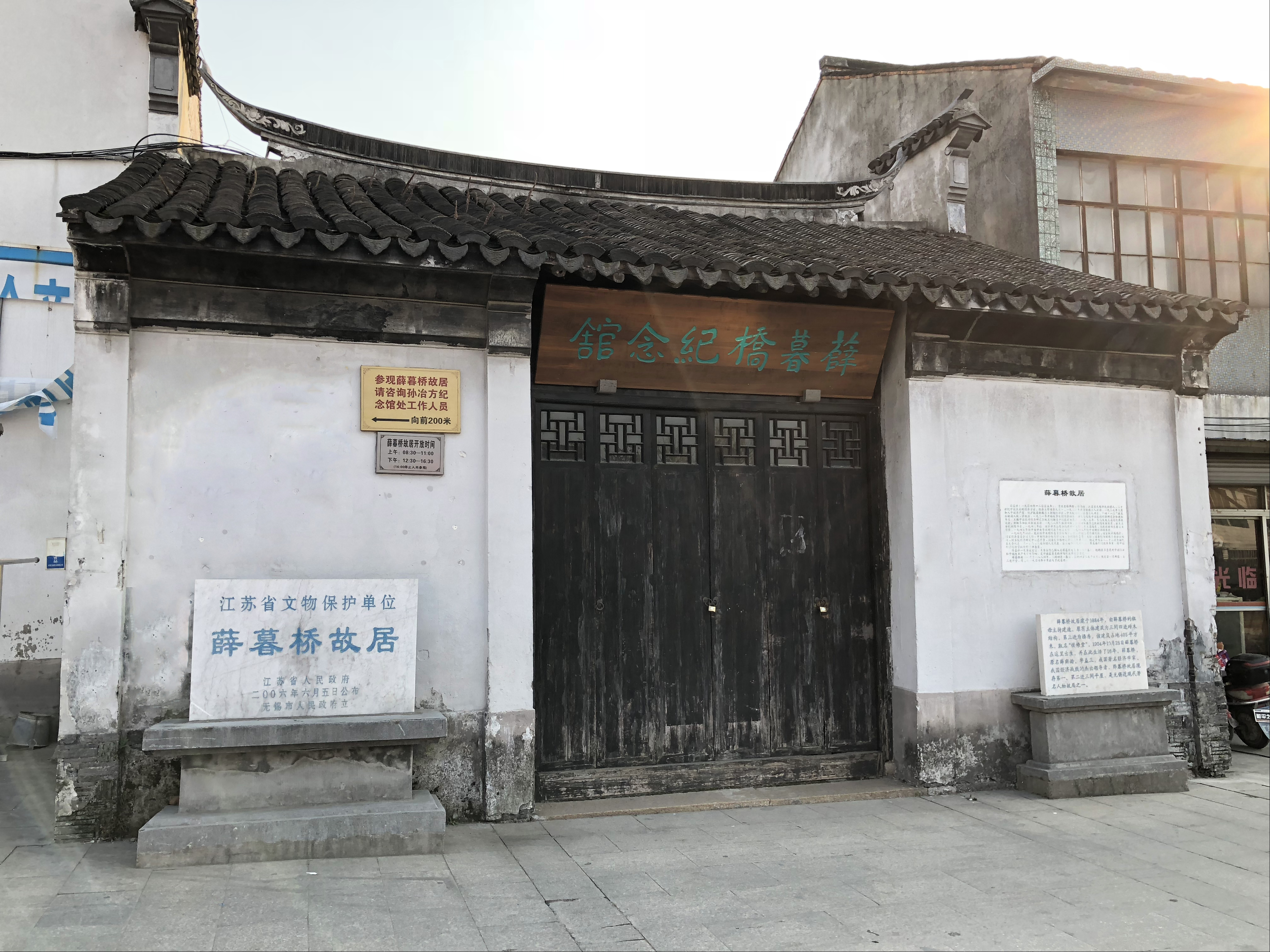
Former Residence of Xue Muqiao

Xue Muqiao (Chinese: 薛暮桥; pinyin: Xuē Mùqiáo; 25 October 1904 – 22 July 2005) was an eminent Chinese economist and politician. He was instrumental in introducing and implementing economic reforms that transformed China into a socialist market economy by participating in the development of the ideological concept of a primary stage of socialism and of a "commodity economy".

Xue was born in Wuxi, Jiangsu Province as Xue Yulin (薛雨林). He served as the director of the National Bureau of Statistics of the People's Republic of China in the 1950s. He was a fellow of Chinese Academy of Sciences and a member of the Chinese Communist Party. In 2005, Xue received the first Outstanding Achievement Award of Economics in China.

== Early life ==
Xue was born into an educated family of a formerly wealthy clan experiencing both social and economic decline. When Xue was a child, his father committed suicide because of the family's overwhelming debt burden. Xue joined the Chinese Communist Party (CCP) at age 23, and studied Marxism and economics while imprisoned by the Nationalist forces for his activism in the railroad workers movement.

Xue also edited China's Countryside.

== Early intellectual contributions ==
Xue's first work as an intellectual was his participation in Marxist historian Chen Hansheng's survey work of the Chinese countryside in the 1930s.The goal of the research team was to conduct a large scale data collection effort in order to address China's stage of historical development, specifically the extent to which the country was semi-feudal or the extent to which it was semi-colonial. As part of this research, Xue surveyed his own home town, documenting its significant levels of development and agricultural production during the period of the Jiaqing Emperor "and compared this with the pitiable state of opium addiction and gambling financed by excessive rent extraction in Xue's own time."

Xue's early intellectual work also helped document the exploitive nature of China's rural economy at the time, showing that 10 percent of the rural population owned 70 percent of the land. In other words, most people who lived in rural China were at the mercy of feudal landlords and wealthy peasants.

In 1943, Xue became a major part of the CCP's economic work in Shandong. The CCP's economic goal at the time was to drive out the Nationalists' competing currency from areas liberated by the communists. The communists' first attempt to do so in Shandong (relying on administrative measures to set exchange rates arbitrarily) failed. Xue argued that the party should instead manipulate market forces to oust the Nationalists' currency. He also disagreed with those in the party who advocated for backing the CCP's paper money with precious metals because "[d]uring a period of material shortage, food and cotton are more valuable than gold and silver, which cannot fulfill stomachs and protect against the cold." At Xue's advice, the CCP revived the traditional "salt channel" which in turn allowed it to build up stocks of essential goods and competing currencies. Under this method, the CCP government sold the right to participate in salt farming to private businesses, which in turn rented to salt farmers — and only to salt farmers willing to work with the CCP. Gradually, the CCP came to control the profitable salt trade, and used the revenue to support its military and secure the value of its currency.

== Career ==
As a result of his role as a key strategist of "economic warfare," price stabilization, and driver out the competing currency of the Nationalists in Shandong, Xue developed a reputation as a leading authority on economic and financial matters. "His writings became important instructional materials for soldiers and cadres."

In 1948, Xue's work focused on the creation of a planned economy. In 1949, he was named to numerous positions in the People's Republic of China government, including secretary general of the Finance and Economics Committee of the State Council, director of the Bureau of Private Enterprises, the National Bureau of Statistics, the National Price Commission, and the Economic Research Center of the State Council, and deputy director of the National Planning Commission.

Xue continued his work on price stabilization following the failure of the Great Leap Forward.

Xue was sent into the countryside for "reeducation by labor" in 1969.

He published his reformist economic thinking in the late 1970s, particularly his influential volume China's Socialist Economy. Although an initial proponent of the gradual creation of markets by the state, Xue came to support "package reform." He supported the market reform agenda and played a role in its revival after 1989.

Economist Isabella Weber describes Xue as a "key interlocutor with foreign guests" on economic matters, given his reputation as an "eminent economist" and his role as the leader of the Price Research Center. In 1985, he attended the Bashan Conference. In 1990, he said in a letter to the Politburo Standing Committee that "peaceful evolution" was "not sufficient to explain . . . the dramatic changes in Eastern Europe", adding "the main reason for the setbacks in Eastern Europe is that there was no thorough reform".

== Xue Muqiao's theory of the "immature socialist system" ==
Xue Muqiao introduced the term "underdeveloped socialism" in his book China's Socialist Economy. The book was written in the orthodox Marxist–Leninist framework enunciated by Joseph Stalin in Economic Problems of Socialism in the U.S.S.R. (1952). Xue wrote that within the socialist mode of production there were several phases and for China to reach an advanced form of socialism it had to focus on developing the productive forces. He proposed a theory in which the basic laws of economic growth were those in which "the relations of production must conform to the level of the productive forces". Similar to Stalin, Xue considered the productive forces to be primary and that the relations of production had to conform to the level of the productive forces. Xue believed that this was a fundamental universal law of economics. Unlike Stalin, Xue believed there were principles that guided the socialist transition, the key one being the principle of "from each according to his ability, to each according to his work"; this principle would guide socialist development, even when China had reached advanced socialism, and would be replaced with "from each according to his ability, to each according to his need" only when there existed general abundance. Xue based his arguments upon the economic policies pursued during the Cultural Revolution, which he believed had led to "the most severe setbacks and heaviest losses suffered by the Party, the state and the people since the founding of the People's Republic".

Xue believed the relations of production were determined by ownership in the economy. He said that since the productive forces in China were "backward", the relations of production were at a comparable level. While believing industry in China had become the "ownership of the whole people", Xue said agriculture was lagging far behind, which required ending the practice of paying wages based on collective efforts, supporting the re-introduction of individual incentives and increasing state investments in agriculture. Xue's suggestions were abandoned at the 6th Plenary Session of the 11th Central Committee held in June 1981 because they failed to solve the problems facing agriculture. From the 6th Plenary Session onwards, the CCP led by Wan Li began supporting the de-collectivization of agriculture. At the beginning, Wan chose a conservative reformist approach, stating that:

Prudence is necessary when approaching the reform of the commune institutions. We should not require each level to reform from top to bottom by prescribing a time limit for fulfilment. Until suitable new organizational forms can replace production brigades and teams, we should not recklessly change existing forms and bring about a disorderly situation.

Wan called for the dismantlement of the People's Commune system and its replacement with a household-responsibility system. He referred to the changes underway in the agricultural system as the creation of a new mode of production and called it the socialist commodity economy. Party theorist Du Runsheng supported Wan's position, saying, "a principle of Marxism is that every change in the relations of ownership is an inevitable outcome of the development of new productive forces which can no longer fit in with the old relations of ownership". He also said:

Today's household undertakings are very different in nature. Since land is owned by the public, they are restricted by the collective economy in many ways. They represent a level of management in the co-operative economy, and constitute an organic component part of the entire socialist economy... It is feared that the household contracting system will promote the conservative idea of private possession among the peasants. This fear is not without grounds. However, we must be able to see the other side of the matter, which also happens to be the prevailing aspect. Today's peasants are different from those of the past. They are now new-type labourers under the socialist co-operative system.

== Notes and references ==
=== Works cited ===
- McCarthy, Greg (1985). Brugger, Bill (ed.). Chinese Marxism in Flux, 1978–84: Essays on Epistemology, Ideology, and Political Economy. M.E. Sharpe. ISBN 0873323238.
- Weber, Isabella (2021). How China Escaped Shock Therapy: The Market Reform Debate. Abingdon, Oxon: Routledge. doi:10.4324/9780429490125. ISBN 978-0-429-49012-5. OCLC 1228187814.
- Gewirtz, Julian (2022). Never Turn Back: China and the Forbidden History of the 1980s. Harvard University Press. doi:10.4159/9780674287372. ISBN 9780674241848. JSTOR j.ctv2zfjdkp.
