= Peking University Press =

Chinese state publishing house

北京大学出版社 Peking University Press
- Status: active
- Founded: 1902
- Country of origin: China
- Headquarters location: Beijing
- Distribution: Worldwide
- Publication types: Books, E-books, and Journals
- Owner: Peking University
- Official website: www.pup.cn

Peking University Press (simplified Chinese: 北京大学出版社; traditional Chinese: 北京大學出版社; pinyin: Běijīng Dàxué Chūbǎnshè), shortly PUP, is the publishing house of Peking University. Established in 1902, it was the first university press in China. PUP publishes a wide range of products, including university textbooks, reference books, academic works, and important ancient and rare books. Its publications cover many disciplines, from the humanities and social science, to natural science and information technology.

== History ==
Peking University Press
- Simplified Chinese: 北京大学出版社
- Traditional Chinese: 北京大學出版社
Transcriptions
Standard Mandarin
- Hanyu Pinyin: Běijīng Dàxué Chūbǎnshè

The predecessor of Peking University Press can be traced back to the Translation Bureau and Compilation Department of the Imperial University of Peking established in 1902. The Translation Bureau translated Western textbooks and other books, while the Compilation Department compiled Chinese textbooks. Translator and thinker Yan Fu once served as the general manager of the Translation Bureau.

In 1918, Peking University established a publishing department to publish university textbooks and academic works.

In 1952, according to the overall layout of the country, Peking University stopped publishing activities.

In 1979, after the period of reform and opening up started, with the approval of the government, Peking University Press resumed operation.

In December 2010, Peking University Press became registered as "Peking University Press Co., Ltd". In May of the same year, it was selected “The Most Influential Brand of English Educational Institutions”.

In late 2024, it was reported that PUP published 1,000 new titles with 4,000 reprints each year.

== Products ==
Peking University Press publishes a wide range of products, including university textbooks, academic works, reference books, and important ancient and rare books, as well as academic journals, audio-visual and electronic products. The areas range from humanities, social sciences, to natural sciences and information technology. Among the current published products, textbooks account for 35%, academic works account for 45%, and general books account for 20%. The book reprint rate is 60%.

== International cooperation ==
Peking University maintains cooperation with various other presses around the world. One such field of cooperation is copyright, with PUP ranking first in copyright transfer both to and from other countries.

On 25 November 2024, PUP signed an agreement with Brill, a world-renowned academic humanities publisher, to cooperate on a large collection of Confucian classics and commentaries, including 660 texts and around 200 million characters in Classical Chinese.
