= Ganzhou railway station =

Railway station in Ganzhou, China

Ganzhou 赣州
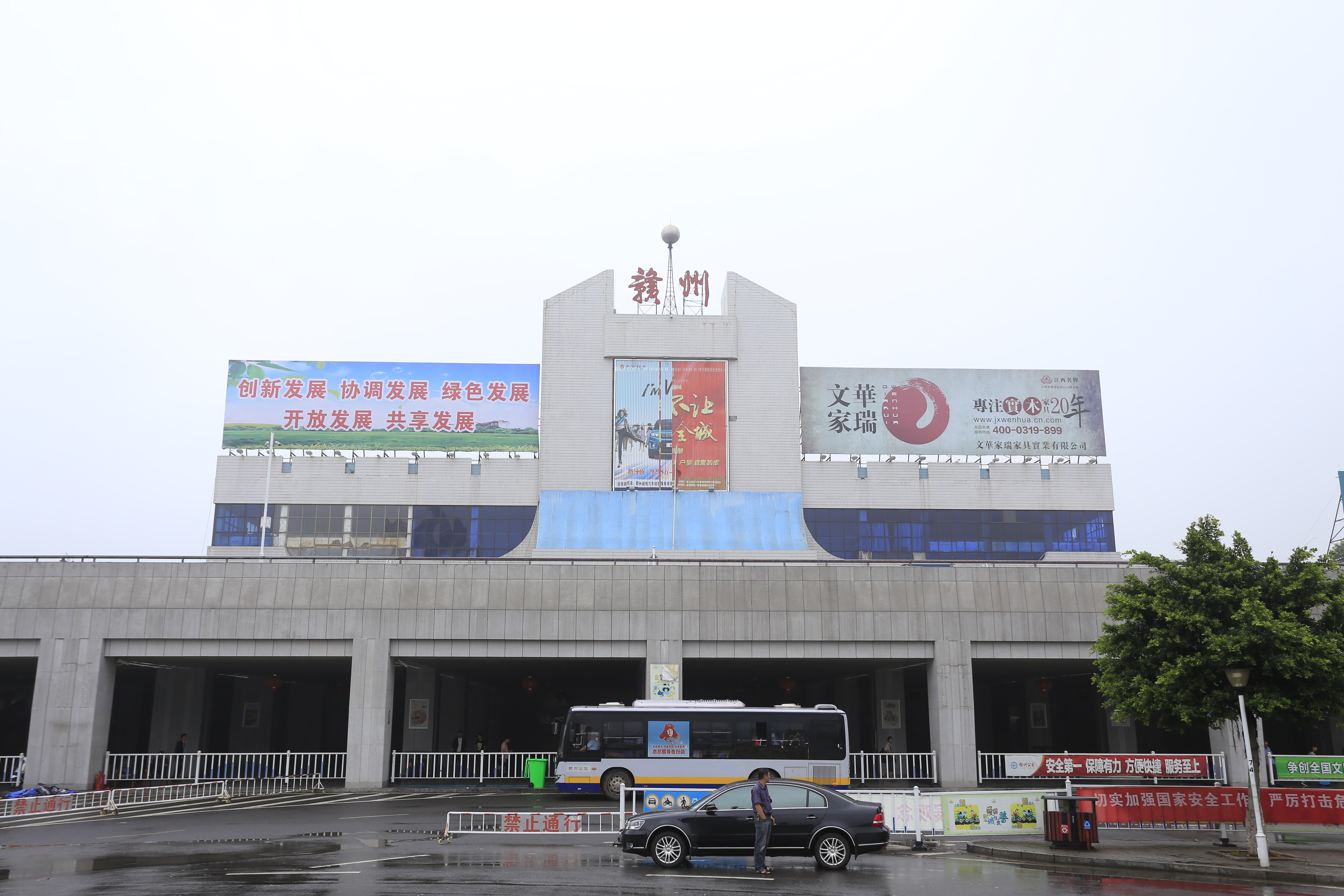

General information
- Location: Zhanggong District, Ganzhou, Jiangxi; China
- Operator: China Railway Corporation
- Lines: Beijing–Kowloon railway Ganzhou–Longyan railway Ganzhou–Ruijin–Longyan railway Ganzhou–Shaoguan railway
- Platforms: 5

History
- Opened: 1996
Location

Ganzhou railway station is a railway station located in Zhanggong District, Ganzhou, Jiangxi, China. It is one of two passenger railway stations in Ganzhou, the other being Ganzhou West railway station which is served by high-speed trains. It has five platforms and an avoiding line in each direction.

== History ==
The railway station was opened in 1996 with the Beijing–Kowloon railway. An additional island platform was put into use in January 2013.

Preceding station	China Railway	Following station
Xingguo towards Beijing West	Beijing–Kowloon railway	Xinfeng towards Hung Hom
Terminus	Ganzhou–Shaoguan railway	Dayu towards Shaoguan East
Terminus	Ganzhou–Longyan railway	Yudu towards Longyan
