= Yudu County =

Yudu County 于都县 Yutu
- County
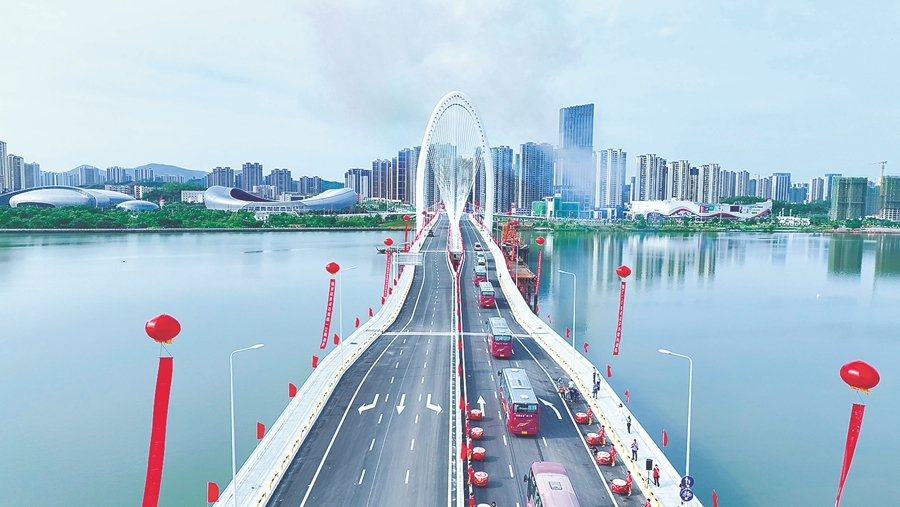

- Location in Jiangxi
- Coordinates: 25°57′27″N 115°29′13″E
- Country: People's Republic of China
- Province: Jiangxi
- Prefecture-level city: Ganzhou

Area
  - Total: 2,893 km^{2} (1,117 sq mi)

Population (2012 census)
  - Total: 1,046,769
  - Density: 361.8/km^{2} (937.1/sq mi)
- Postal Code: 342300
- Area code: 0797
- Website: http://www.yudu.gov.cn/

Yudu County (Chinese: 于都县; pinyin: Yúdū Xiàn, 雩都) is a county under the administration of the prefecture-level city of Ganzhou, located in the south of Jiangxi province, China. It is located in the east of Ganzhou City. It is adjacent to Ruijin City to the east, Huichang County and Anyuan County to the south, Ganxian District to the west, and Xingguo County and Ningdu County to the north. With a total area of 2893 square kilometers, it has jurisdiction over 9 towns and 14 townships, with a total registered population of 1.115 million. The county government is stationed in Gongjiang Town.

The territory belongs to the Hakka Culture (Southern Jiangxi) Ecological Protection Experimental Zone. In 2019, the total production value was 26.62 billion yuan. The "Master Plan for the Development of Ruixing in the Economic Revitalization Pilot Zone" was officially approved by the National Development and Reform Commission. The pilot zone covers the three counties/cities of Ruijin, Xingguo and Yudu, with a total population of approximately 2.3 million. The plan envisages that Ruixing will be built in the experimental zone into a "special economic zone in the old revolutionary base areas" and "experimental zone in the special zone".

In March 2019, it ranked among the first batch of counties in the revolutionary cultural relics protection and utilization area. On May 20, 2019, General Secretary Xi Jinping came to Jiangxi for investigation. During the investigation, he went to Yudu County to present a flower basket to the Monument to the Long March of the Central Red Army. On April 26, 2020, Yudu County was removed from the list of poverty-stricken counties.

== History ==
Yudu County was established in the year 201 BC (Han Dynasty). It is known as the "mother of six counties" and "the three provinces of Fujian, Guangdong and Hunan". The name Yudu (雩都) came from its highest mountain, Yushan Mountain (雩山), and was renamed to "于都" in 1951. In 1934 the county was the starting point of the Long March for the First Red Army.

== Administrative divisions ==
Yudu County has 9 towns and 14 townships.

9 towns

- Gongjiang (贡江镇)
- Tieshanlong (铁山垅镇)
- Pangushan (盘古山镇)
- Hefeng (禾丰镇)
- Qilushan (祁禄山镇)
- Zishan (梓山镇)
- Yinkeng (银坑镇)
- Lingbei (岭背镇)
- Luo'ao (罗坳镇)

14 townships

- Luojiang (罗江乡)
- Xiaoxi (小溪乡)
- Licun (利村乡)
- Xinbei (新陂乡)
- Jingshi (靖石乡)
- Huanglin (黄麟乡)
- Shaxin (沙心乡)
- Kuantian (宽田乡)
- Ge'ao (葛坳乡)
- Qiaotou (桥头乡)
- Ma'an (马安乡)
- Xianxia (仙下乡)
- Chexi (车溪乡)
- Duanwu (段屋乡)

== Climate ==
Climate data for Yudu, elevation 133 m (436 ft), (1991–2020 normals, extremes 1981–present)
Month	Jan	Feb	Mar	Apr	May	Jun	Jul	Aug	Sep	Oct	Nov	Dec	Year
Record high °C (°F)	27.9 (82.2)	32.3 (90.1)	32.3 (90.1)	34.7 (94.5)	36.7 (98.1)	37.9 (100.2)	41.0 (105.8)	40.7 (105.3)	38.6 (101.5)	36.3 (97.3)	33.3 (91.9)	28.0 (82.4)	41.0 (105.8)
Mean daily maximum °C (°F)	13.3 (55.9)	16.1 (61.0)	19.2 (66.6)	25.4 (77.7)	29.3 (84.7)	31.9 (89.4)	34.8 (94.6)	34.3 (93.7)	31.3 (88.3)	27.1 (80.8)	21.8 (71.2)	15.8 (60.4)	25.0 (77.0)
Daily mean °C (°F)	8.8 (47.8)	11.4 (52.5)	14.7 (58.5)	20.6 (69.1)	24.6 (76.3)	27.4 (81.3)	29.7 (85.5)	29.1 (84.4)	26.5 (79.7)	21.9 (71.4)	16.4 (61.5)	10.6 (51.1)	20.1 (68.3)
Mean daily minimum °C (°F)	6.0 (42.8)	8.3 (46.9)	11.7 (53.1)	17.1 (62.8)	21.2 (70.2)	24.2 (75.6)	25.8 (78.4)	25.4 (77.7)	22.9 (73.2)	18.1 (64.6)	12.7 (54.9)	7.2 (45.0)	16.7 (62.1)
Record low °C (°F)	−3.5 (25.7)	−2.6 (27.3)	−1.2 (29.8)	5.0 (41.0)	10.3 (50.5)	15.7 (60.3)	19.5 (67.1)	20.0 (68.0)	14.8 (58.6)	6.2 (43.2)	1.2 (34.2)	−5.0 (23.0)	−5.0 (23.0)
Average precipitation mm (inches)	70.3 (2.77)	98.1 (3.86)	182.3 (7.18)	163.8 (6.45)	245.1 (9.65)	224.8 (8.85)	143.9 (5.67)	152.7 (6.01)	83.0 (3.27)	55.1 (2.17)	62.5 (2.46)	52.2 (2.06)	1,533.8 (60.4)
Average precipitation days (≥ 0.1 mm)	11.3	12.7	18.7	16.3	17.5	17.4	12.9	14.2	9.2	6.3	7.6	8.5	152.6
Average snowy days	1.0	0.6	0	0	0	0	0	0	0	0	0	0.3	1.9
Average relative humidity (%)	76	77	80	77	77	77	70	73	73	69	73	73	75
Mean monthly sunshine hours	84.8	83.2	75.2	104.3	125.7	139.1	229.0	206.7	167.8	163.9	137.5	125.7	1,642.9
Percentage possible sunshine	25	26	20	27	30	34	55	52	46	46	43	39	37
Source: China Meteorological Administrationall-time May low

== Gallery ==
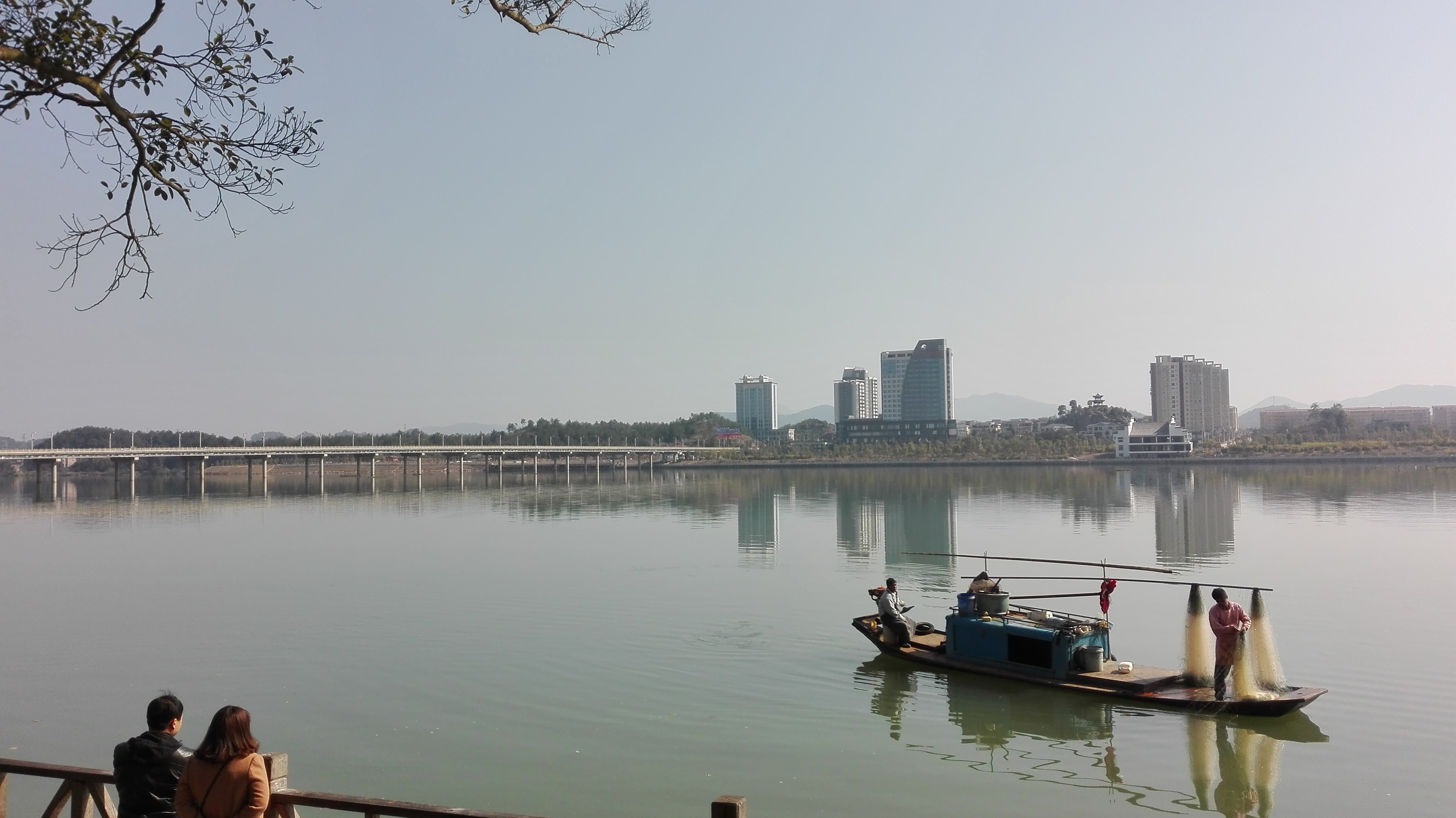
Cityscape of Yudu from Gong River.

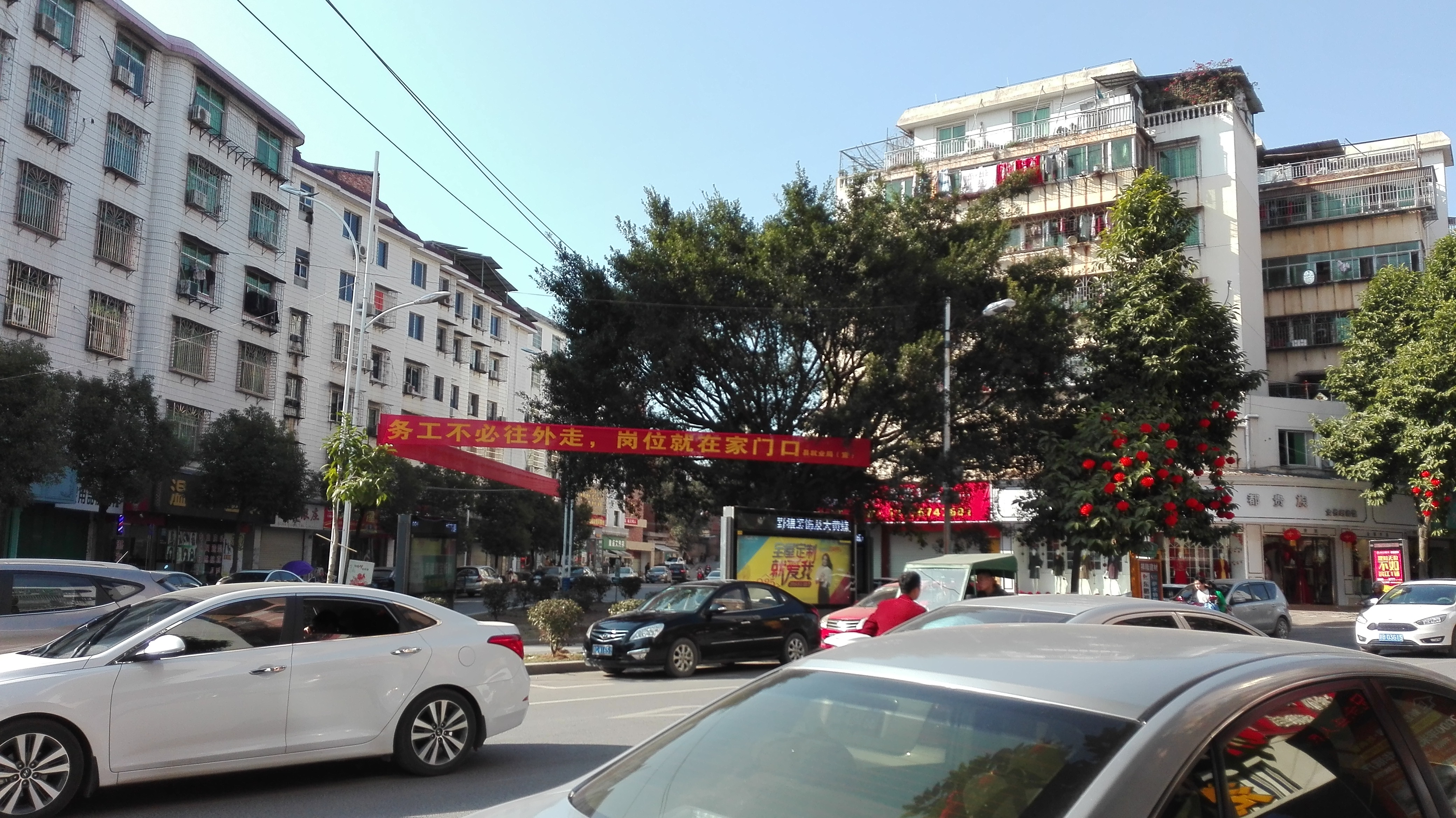
Hongqi Avenue in Yudu.

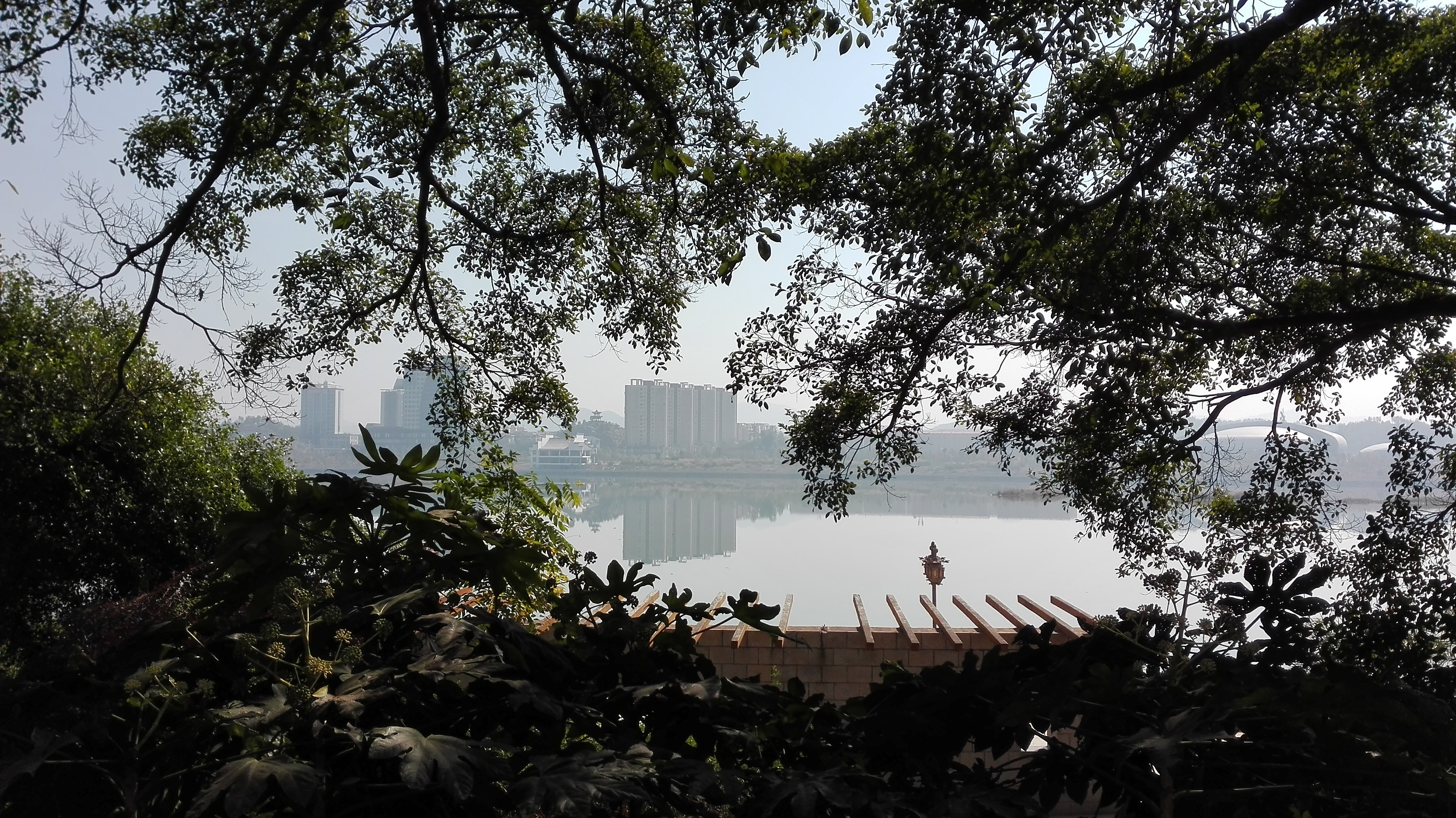
View of town center across the Gong River.

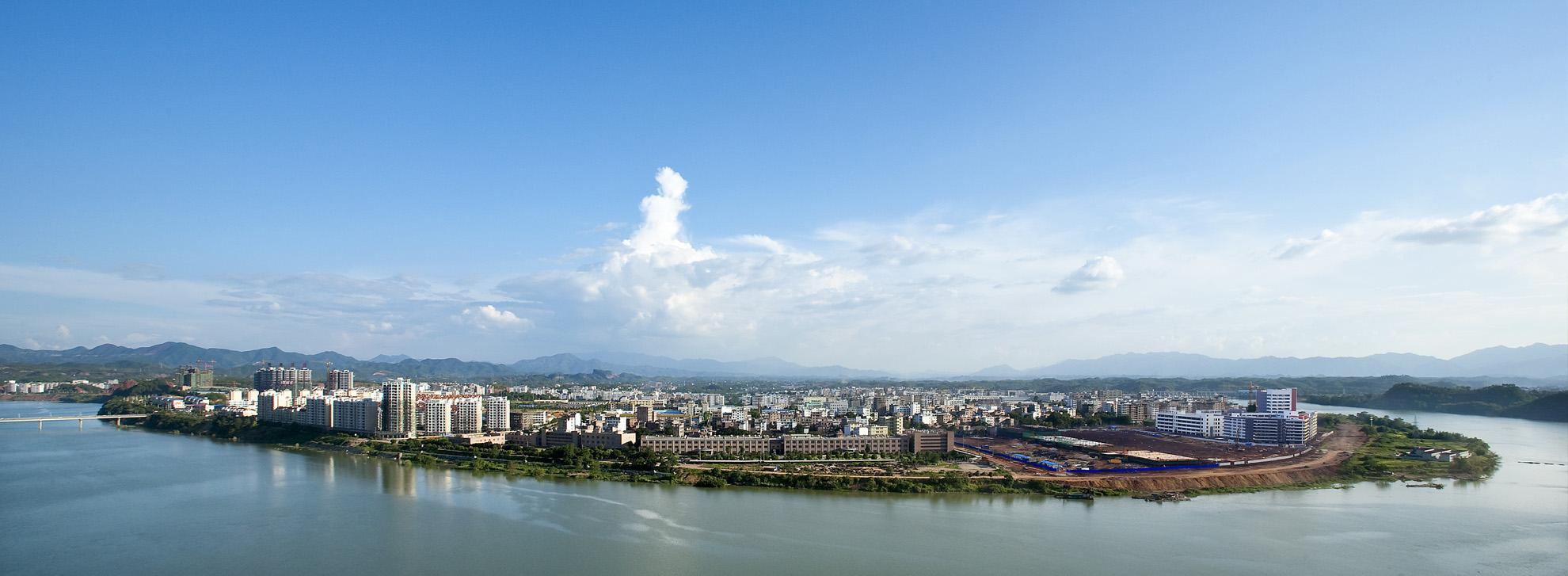
Paranoma view of town center.

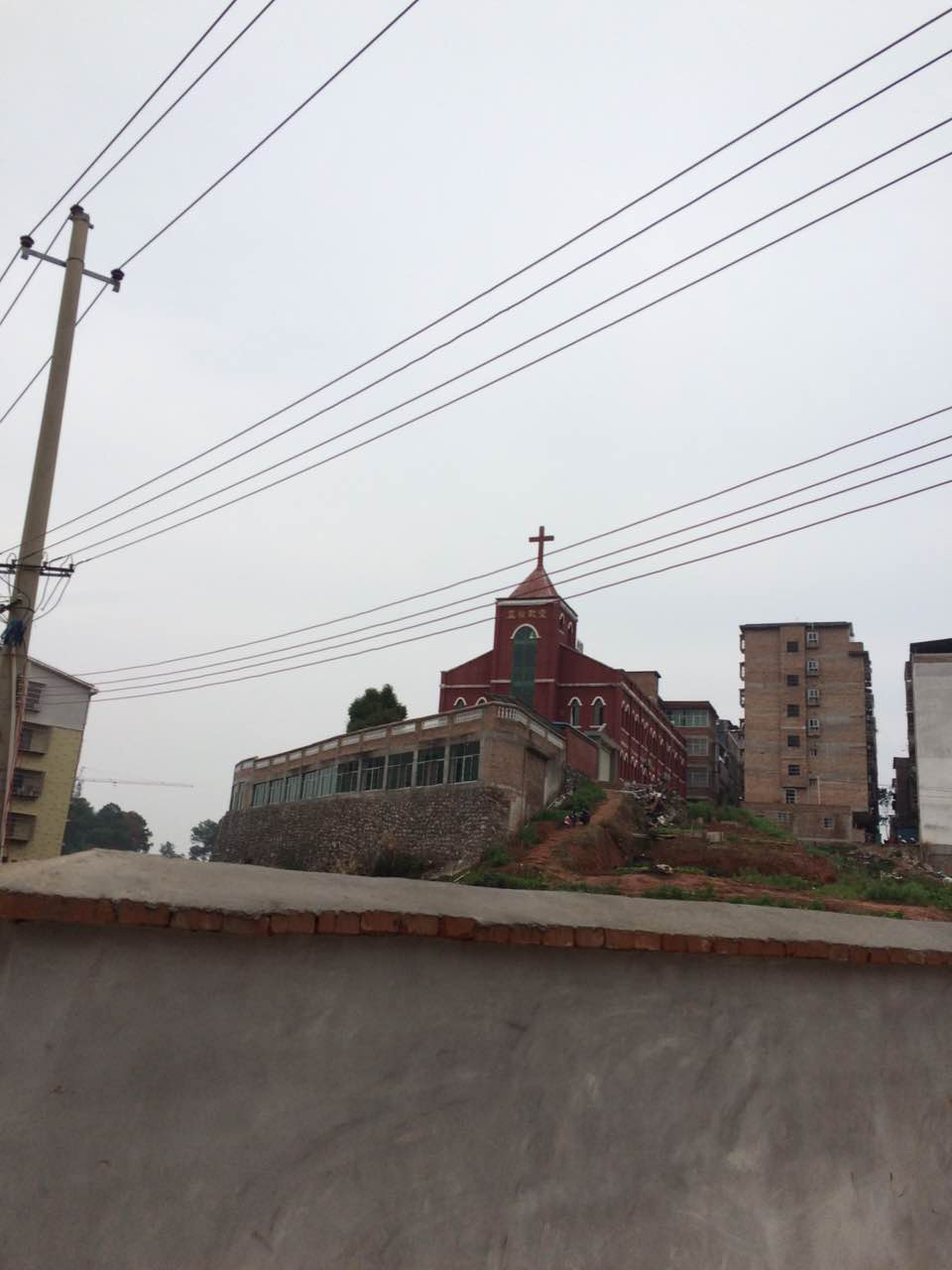
A church in Yudu.

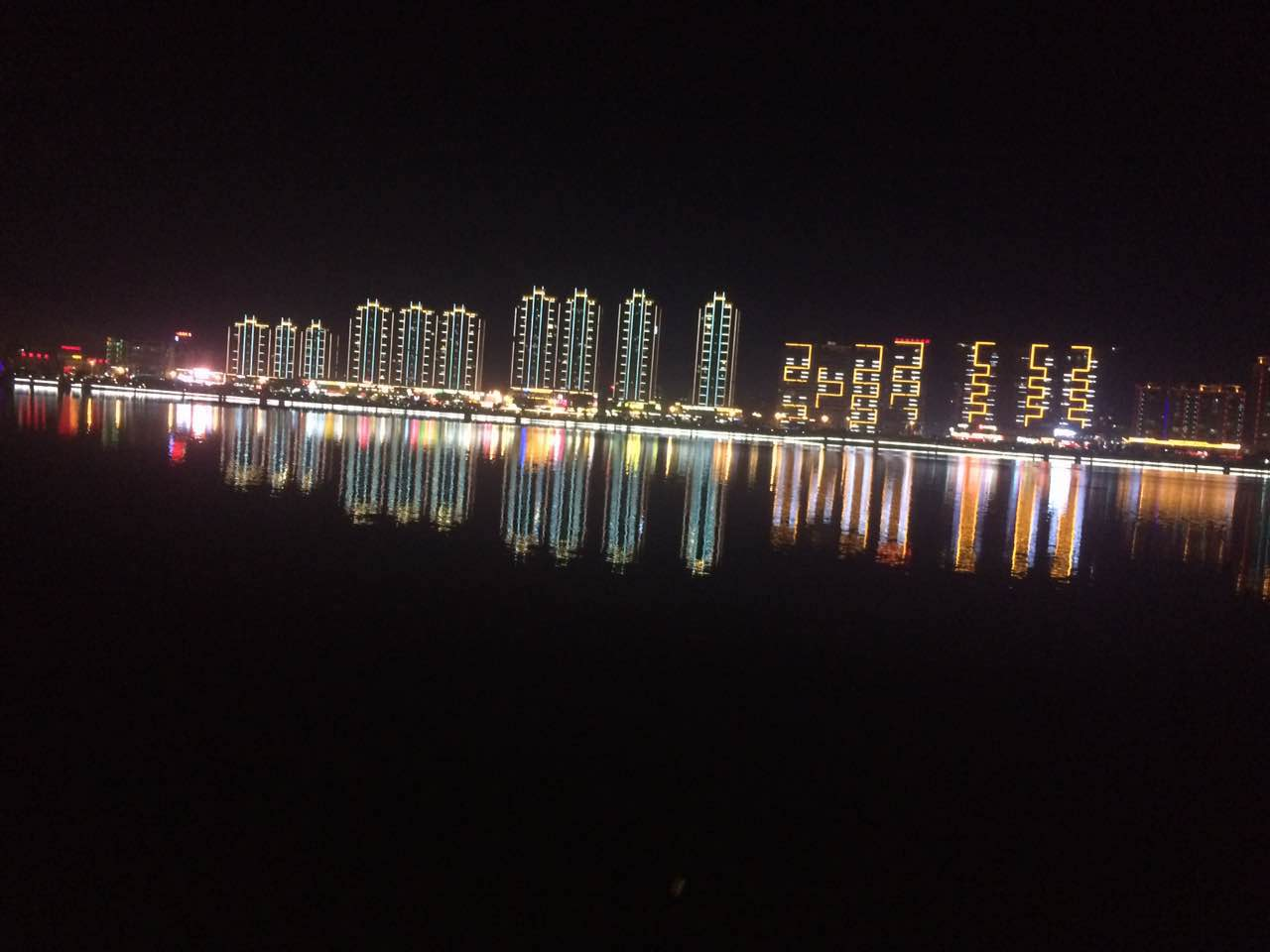
Night scene of Yudu.

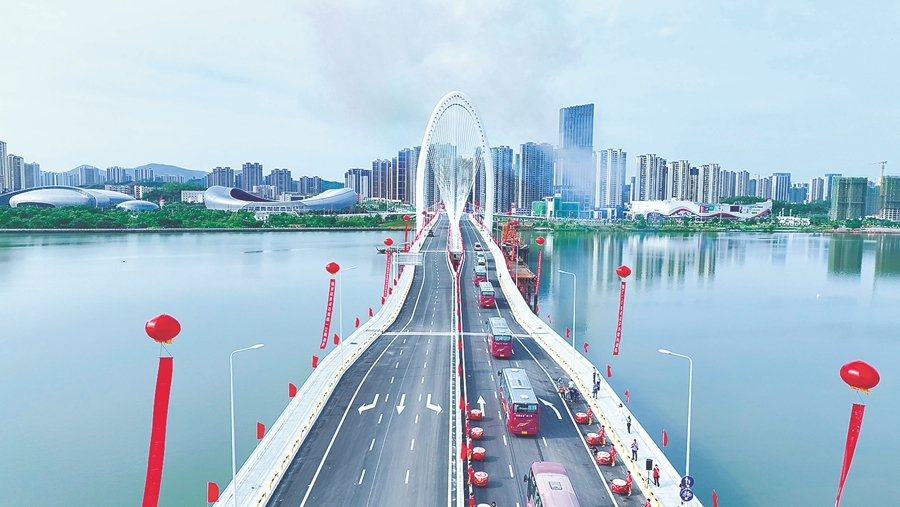
The Jijie Bridge of Yudu

== Transport ==
- Ganzhou–Longyan Railway
