= Xianxia (disambiguation) =

Xianxia may refer to:

- Xianxia (genre) (仙侠小说), a subset of Chinese wuxia fiction
- Xianxia, Anhui (仙霞镇), town in Ningguo, Anhui, China
- Xianxia Township (仙下乡), Yudu County, Jiangxi, China
