= Nankang, Ganzhou =

Nankang 南康区
- District
- Location of Nankang (red) in Jiangxi. The map includes the towns of Tandong and Tankou, now administered by the neighboring Zhanggong District
- Coordinates: 25°39′43″N 114°45′54″E
- Country: People's Republic of China
- Province: Jiangxi
- Prefecture-level city: Ganzhou

Area
  - Total: 1,796 km^{2} (693 sq mi)

Population (2010)
  - Total: 787,636
  - Density: 438.6/km^{2} (1,136/sq mi)
- Postal Code: 341400

Nankang (Chinese: 南康) is a district of the city of Ganzhou in southern Jiangxi province. It was a county-level city until November 2013, when the State Council made it a district of Ganzhou.

== Administration ==
Nankang has a population of 810,000. It covers an area of 1796 square kilometers. The seat of the district is at Rongjiang Town (蓉江镇).

In the present, Nankang District has 2 subdistricts, 8 towns, 11 townships and 1 ethnic township.

2 subdistricts

- Rongjiang (蓉江街道)
- Dongshan (东山街道)

8 towns

- Tangjiang (唐江镇)
- Fenggang (凤岗镇)
- Tankou (潭口镇)
- Longling (龙岭镇)
- Longhui (龙回镇)
- Jingba (镜坝镇)
- Hengshi (横市镇)
- Tandong (潭东镇)

11 townships

- Fushi (浮石乡)
- Hengzhai (横寨乡)
- Zhufang (朱坊乡)
- Taiwo (太窝乡)
- Sanjiang (三江乡)
- Longhua (龙华乡)
- Shibatang (十八塘乡)
- Mashuang (麻双乡)
- Daping (大坪乡)
- Pingshi (坪市乡)
- Longmu (隆木乡)

1 ethnic township

- Chitu She Ethnic Township (赤土畲族乡)

== Climate ==
Climate data for Nankang, elevation 127 m (417 ft), (1991–2020 normals, extremes 1981–present)
Month	Jan	Feb	Mar	Apr	May	Jun	Jul	Aug	Sep	Oct	Nov	Dec	Year
Record high °C (°F)	27.8 (82.0)	31.7 (89.1)	32.0 (89.6)	34.5 (94.1)	36.2 (97.2)	37.7 (99.9)	40.1 (104.2)	41.7 (107.1)	38.6 (101.5)	36.6 (97.9)	33.5 (92.3)	28.3 (82.9)	41.7 (107.1)
Mean daily maximum °C (°F)	12.9 (55.2)	15.7 (60.3)	18.9 (66.0)	25.1 (77.2)	29.1 (84.4)	31.7 (89.1)	34.6 (94.3)	34.0 (93.2)	30.9 (87.6)	26.7 (80.1)	21.3 (70.3)	15.3 (59.5)	24.7 (76.4)
Daily mean °C (°F)	8.4 (47.1)	11.0 (51.8)	14.4 (57.9)	20.3 (68.5)	24.3 (75.7)	27.1 (80.8)	29.3 (84.7)	28.5 (83.3)	25.7 (78.3)	21.0 (69.8)	15.6 (60.1)	10.0 (50.0)	19.6 (67.3)
Mean daily minimum °C (°F)	5.4 (41.7)	7.8 (46.0)	11.3 (52.3)	16.8 (62.2)	20.9 (69.6)	23.9 (75.0)	25.4 (77.7)	24.8 (76.6)	22.1 (71.8)	17.0 (62.6)	11.7 (53.1)	6.3 (43.3)	16.1 (61.0)
Record low °C (°F)	−3.7 (25.3)	−2.1 (28.2)	−0.7 (30.7)	4.4 (39.9)	10.4 (50.7)	16.3 (61.3)	18.8 (65.8)	20.1 (68.2)	13.7 (56.7)	6.0 (42.8)	0.3 (32.5)	−5.9 (21.4)	−5.9 (21.4)
Average precipitation mm (inches)	73.2 (2.88)	95.6 (3.76)	177.6 (6.99)	169.7 (6.68)	217.2 (8.55)	209.6 (8.25)	126.5 (4.98)	144.8 (5.70)	86.8 (3.42)	55.6 (2.19)	63.6 (2.50)	51.7 (2.04)	1,471.9 (57.94)
Average precipitation days (≥ 0.1 mm)	11.4	13.0	18.2	15.8	17.1	16.6	12.5	13.9	9.7	5.7	8.1	8.2	150.2
Average snowy days	1.1	0.7	0.1	0	0	0	0	0	0	0	0	0.4	2.3
Average relative humidity (%)	79	80	83	80	80	81	73	77	79	75	77	76	78
Mean monthly sunshine hours	82.9	79.7	75.4	103.4	132.2	151.1	241.5	217.9	170.6	164.4	136.5	122.3	1,677.9
Percentage possible sunshine	25	25	20	27	32	37	58	54	47	46	42	38	38
Source: China Meteorological Administrationall-time extreme temperatureall-time May low

== Transportation ==
Ganzhou West railway station is located here.
