= Hengshi =

Hengshi (横市) may refer to these towns in China:

- Hengshi, Hunan, in Ningxiang, Hunan
- Hengshi, Jiangxi, in Ganzhou, Jiangxi

== See also ==
- Hengchi, an electric car brand
