= Bailu Township, Ganzhou =

Bailu Township 白鹭乡
- Township
- Location in Jiangxi Bailu Township (China)
- Coordinates: 26°14′34″N 115°9′6″E
- Country: People's Republic of China
- Province: Jiangxi
- Prefecture-level city: Ganzhou
- District: Ganxian District
- Time zone: UTC+8 (China Standard)

Bailu Township (simplified Chinese: 白鹭乡; traditional Chinese: 白鷺鄉; pinyin: Báilù Xiāng) is a township under the administration of Ganxian District, Ganzhou, Jiangxi, China. As of 2018, it has 13 villages under its administration.

== See also ==
- List of township-level divisions of Jiangxi
