= Ganxian, Ganzhou =

Ganxian 赣县区
- District
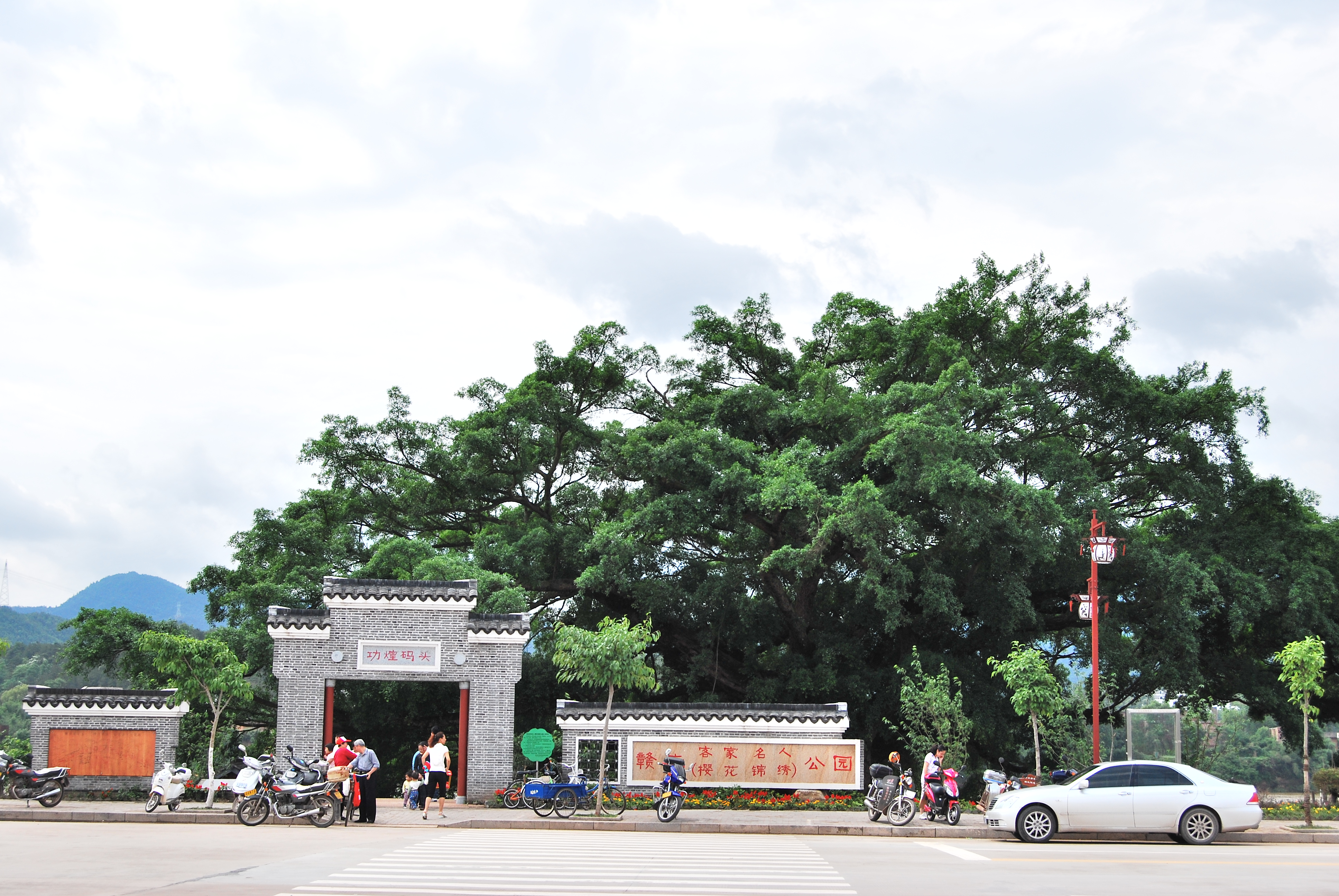

- Location in Jiangxi
- Coordinates: 25°50′27″N 115°05′24″E
- Country: People's Republic of China
- Province: Jiangxi
- Prefecture-level city: Ganzhou
- Seat: Meilin Town

Area
  - Total: 2,993.09 km^{2} (1,155.64 sq mi)

Dimensions
  - Length: 91 km (57 mi)
  - Width: 34 km (21 mi)

Population (2014)
  - Total: 641,677
  - Density: 214.386/km^{2} (555.258/sq mi)
- Time zone: UTC+8 (China Standard)
- Postal Code: 341100
- Area code: 0797
- Vehicle registration: 赣B
- Website: www.ganxian.gov.cn

Ganxian District (simplified Chinese: 赣县区; traditional Chinese: 贛縣區; pinyin: Gànxiàn Qū) is a district in the municipal region of Ganzhou, Jiangxi Province.

== Administration ==
Ganxian has an area of 2,993.09 km^{2} (1,155.64 sq mi). The district executive, legislature and judiciary are at Meilin Town (梅林镇), just upriver from the prefectural seat, together with the CPC and PSB branches. These organs oversee 19 towns & townships.

In the present, Ganxian District has 10 towns and 9 townships.

10 towns

- Meilin (梅林镇)
- Wangmudu (王母渡镇)
- Shadi (沙地镇)
- Jiangkou (江口镇)
- Tiancun (田村镇)
- Nantang (南塘镇)
- Maodian (茅店镇)
- Jibu (吉埠镇)
- Wuyun (五云镇)
- Hujiang (湖江镇)

9 townships

- Hanfang (韩坊乡)
- Yangbu (阳埠乡)
- Dabu (大埠乡)
- Changluo (长洛乡)
- Datian (大田乡)
- Chutan (储潭乡)
- Shiyuan (石芫乡)
- Sanxi (三溪乡)
- Bailu (白鹭乡)

== People ==
The population was 546,964 at the 2010 census. At the end of 2014 there were 641,677 inhabitants in Ganxian, among them there were 336,054 male inhabitants and 305,623 female inhabitants. The farming population was 540,131. There were 170,729 households. 99.5% of the inhabitants of Ganxian are Hakka.

== Transport ==
- Ganzhou–Longyan Railway
