= Ganzhou–Ruijin–Longyan railway =

Ganzhou–Ruijin–Longyan railway simplified Chinese: 赣瑞龙铁路; traditional Chinese: 贛瑞龍鐵路; pinyin: Gàn ruì lóng tiělù

Overview
- Status: Open
- Owner: China Railway
- Locale: Ganzhou and Fujian, China
- Termini: Ganxian; Longyan
- Stations: 8

Service
- Operator: CR Nanchang Group

Technical
- Line length: 290.1 km (180.3 mi)
- Num of tracks: 2
- Track gauge: 1,435 mm (4 ft 8 1/2 in)
- Minimum radius: 3,500 m (11,500 ft) (normal); 2,800 m (9,200 ft) (difficult)
- Electrification: 25 kV 50 Hz AC (overhead line)
- Operating speed: 200 kilometres per hour (120 mph) (design speed)
- Maximum incline: 0.6% (Ganzhou–Ruijin); 1.3% (Ruijin–Longyan)

The Ganzhou–Ruijin–Longyan railway or Ganruilong railway (simplified Chinese: 赣瑞龙铁路; traditional Chinese: 贛瑞龍鐵路; pinyin: Gàn ruì lóng tiělù), (also known as the "Ganlong Railway Upgrade and Renovation Project") runs from Ganzhou, Jiangxi province, to Longyan, Fujian province, with a total length of 249 km (155 mi). It runs parallel to the Ganzhou–Longyan railway on a more direct alignment and has two tracks. The old one-track Ganzhou–Longyan line is now used for freight. It forms part of the Xiamen–Chongqing corridor of the eight north–south routes in China's "Eight Vertical and Eight Horizontal" network.

== Overview ==
The "Ganzhou–Longyan Railway Expansion and Renovation Project", also known as the Ganzhou–Longyan Railway Double-Track Project, is essentially a new double-track line built according to the general route of the Ganzhou–Longyan railway, with stations merged at key stations; the entire line is 249.418 km (154.981 mi)-long, with stations at Ganxian, Yudu, Huichang North, Ruijin, Changting South, Guanzhaishan South, Gutianhuizhi and Longyan. Changting South and Gutianhuizhi stations (formerly known as Shanghang North and Shanghang Gutian) are newly established stations, and the remaining stations are merged with the existing stations of the same name on the Ganzhou–Longyan railway.

== History ==
The expansion project of the Ganlong Railway double track was launched in December 2007. According to the plan agreed in April 2008, a new double-track electrified passenger and freight railway with a speed of 200 km/h (120 mph) would be built, while the original single-track railway would be retained so that the railway along the line would be include three tracks. In early December 2008, the "Project Proposal for the Expansion Project of Ganzhou–Longyan Railway" was submitted to the National Development and Reform Commission by the Ministry of Railways, Fujian Province and Jiangxi Province, with an estimated investment of RMB 22.72 billion, On 21 December, the evaluation meeting of the proposal for the new double-track line was held in Beijing,

On 19 March 2009, the National Development and Reform Commission approved the Ganzhou–Longyan Railway Expansion Project, with an investment of RMB 24.696 billion. On 9 November 2009, the Environmental Impact Report for the project was approved, with a total length of 273.206 km (169.762 mi), starting from Ganzhou station on the Beijing–Kowloon railway. On 12 December 2009, the National Development and Reform Commission approved the Feasibility Study Report of the Ganzhou-Longyan Railway Expansion Project, with a total length of 250.4 km (155.6 mi), starting from Ganxian station on the Beijing–Kowloon railway. Some preliminary construction began on 29 December.

=== Construction ===
On 8 November 2010, the Ganzhou–Ruijin–Longyan railway project was officially launched. On 29 December, the project contract signing ceremony was held in Ganzhou. Passenger and freight services were fully separated at Luo'ao station on 2 June 2013. On 28 December 2014, the last tunnel on the main line was completed. On 5 April 2015, the T-beams in the Fujian section were erected. The entire line was completed on 27 June 2015.

=== Joint commissioning and testing ===
Static acceptance was initiated in August 2015. On 25 August 2015, it was revealed that the CR Nanchang had issued the "Notice on Doing a Good Job in Safety Work During the Joint Commissioning and Trial Operation of the Ganzhou–Ruijin–Longyan Railway" (Nanchang Railway Safety Supervision Letter [2015] No. 784). On 11 September 2015, the Ganzhou Railway Section announced that the line would be officially electrified on 15 September. On 12 September, the Nanchang Railway Bureau confirmed the electrification date of the line. On 13 September, the Longyan Railway Section also confirmed the electrification date. Power was officially supplied on 15 September 2015. On 14 October 2015, it entered the joint commissioning and testing phase. Unloaded trial operation was conducted on 26 November 2015. On 7 December 2015, a netizen posted an official document on a forum stating that the Ganruilong railway would strive for a top speed of 330 km/h (210 mph).

=== Open for operation ===
It was launched on 26 December 2015. On 10 December 2021, the "Railway e-Card" service was launched.
