= Yugu Pavilion =

Building in Jiangxi Province, China

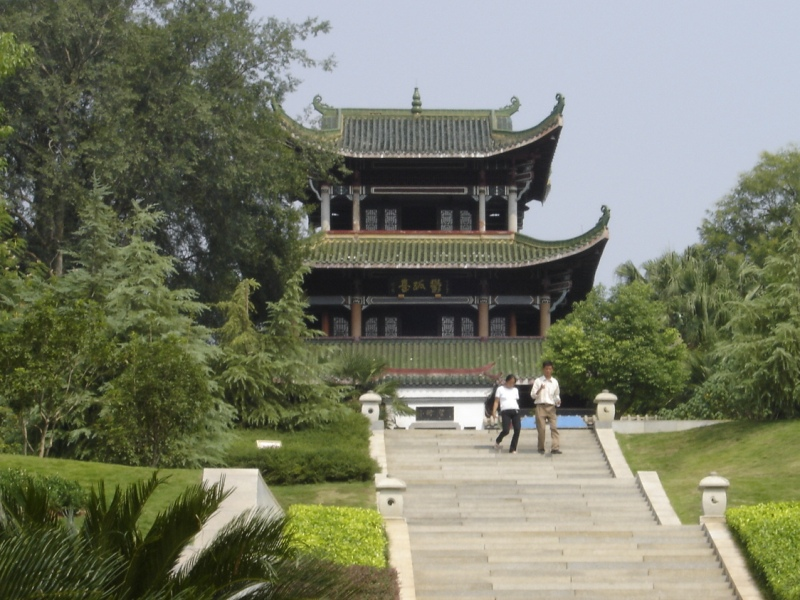
A view from the foot of Helan Hill

Yugu Pavilion (Yugu Tai) (Chinese: 郁孤台) is located on Helan Hill (贺兰山) (also named: Tianluo Hill, 田螺岭) in the north of Ganzhou City, Jiangxi Province, China. It is among the list of Provincial-Level Scenic and Historic Interest Area of Jiangxi.

== History ==
There is no clear record about when this pavilion was originally built. According to the History of Gan County, it already existed before the Guangde to Dali era (763–779) in the Tang dynasty, when the provincial governor Li Mian (李勉) (717–788) changed its name to "Wangque". It collapsed about 200 years later. In 1147 (Shaoxing era, Song dynasty), the regional governor, Zeng Zao (曾慥) (?–1155), built two pavilions on the hill, and named them Yugu and Wangque respectively. After that, Yugu Pavilion was destroyed and rebuilt several times.

In the Ming dynasty, Yugu Pavilion served as the workplace of the regional government from the Hongwu to Zhengde era.

== Present ==
The penultimate construction was in the Tongzhi era of the Qing dynasty after a wind disaster in 1869. That building was once restored in 1959, but replaced with a new reinforced concrete-structure one in 1984. The shape of the building is maintained. It is 17 meters tall and has three stories.
