= Shaoguan East railway station =

Railway station in Zhenjiang District, Shaoguan, Guangdong

Shaoguandong 韶关东
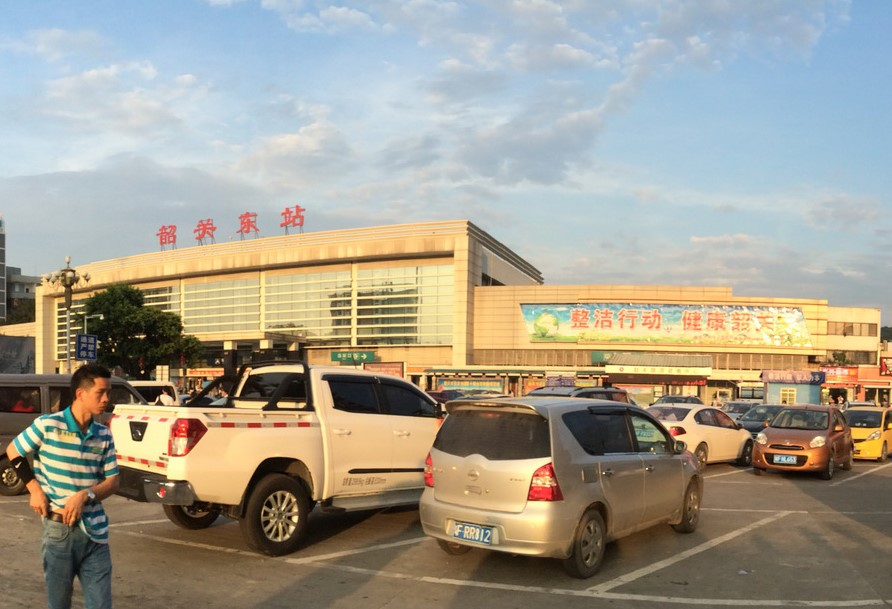

General information
- Location: Zhenjiang District, Shaoguan, Guangdong; China
- Coordinates: 24°47′37.76″N 113°36′17″E
- Line(s): Beijing–Guangzhou railway; Ganzhou–Shaoguan railway

Shaoguan East railway station (Chinese: 韶关东站) is a railway station in Zhenjiang District, Shaoguan, Guangdong, China. It is an intermediate stop on the Beijing–Guangzhou railway and the western terminus of the Ganzhou–Shaoguan railway.

== History ==
On 15 December 2009, the name of this station was changed from Shaoguan to Shaoguan East. This was in preparation for the new Shaoguan railway station. In 2013, the station building was rebuilt.

Preceding station	China Railway	Following station
Lechang towards Beijing or Beijing West	Beijing–Guangzhou railway	Yingde towards Guangzhou
Terminus	Ganzhou–Shaoguan railway	Danxiashan towards Shaoguan East
