= Hengshi, Jiangxi =

Hengshi 横市镇
- Town
- Location in Jiangxi Hengshi (China)
- Coordinates: 26°2′43″N 114°40′7″E
- Country: People's Republic of China
- Province: Jiangxi
- Prefecture-level city: Ganzhou
- District: Nankang District
- Time zone: UTC+8 (China Standard)

Hengshi (simplified Chinese: 横市; traditional Chinese: 橫市; pinyin: Héngshì) is a town in Nankang District, Ganzhou, in southwestern Jiangxi province, China. As of 2018, it had one residential community and 13 villages under its administration.

== See also ==
- List of township-level divisions of Jiangxi
