= Xianxia Township =

Xianxia Township 仙下乡
- Township
- Location in Jiangxi Xianxia Township (China)
- Coordinates: 26°6′33″N 115°33′49″E
- Country: People's Republic of China
- Province: Jiangxi
- Prefecture-level city: Ganzhou
- County: Yudu County
- Time zone: UTC+8 (China Standard)

Xianxia Township (simplified Chinese: 仙下乡; traditional Chinese: 仙下鄉; pinyin: Xiānxià Xiāng) is a township in Yudu County, Jiangxi, China. As of 2020, it administers the following 18 villages:

- Xianxia Village
- Guanbei Village (观背村)
- Shangfang Village (上方村)
- Yangtian Village (洋田村)
- Shikeng Village (石坑村)
- Shibei Village (石陂村)
- Fukeng Village (富坑村)
- Fuxing Village (福星村)
- Tanshi Village (潭石村)
- Sanguan Village (三贯村)
- Shanduan Village (山塅村)
- Zoukeng Village (邹坑村)
- Xiyang Village (西洋村)
- Ji Village (吉村)
- Luanshi Village (乱石村)
- Liantang Village (莲塘村)
- Gaoxing Village (高兴村)
- Longxi Village (龙溪村)

== See also ==
- List of township-level divisions of Jiangxi
