= Tongtian Rock =

Danxia landform scenic spot in Jiangxi Province, China

- Tongtian Cliff
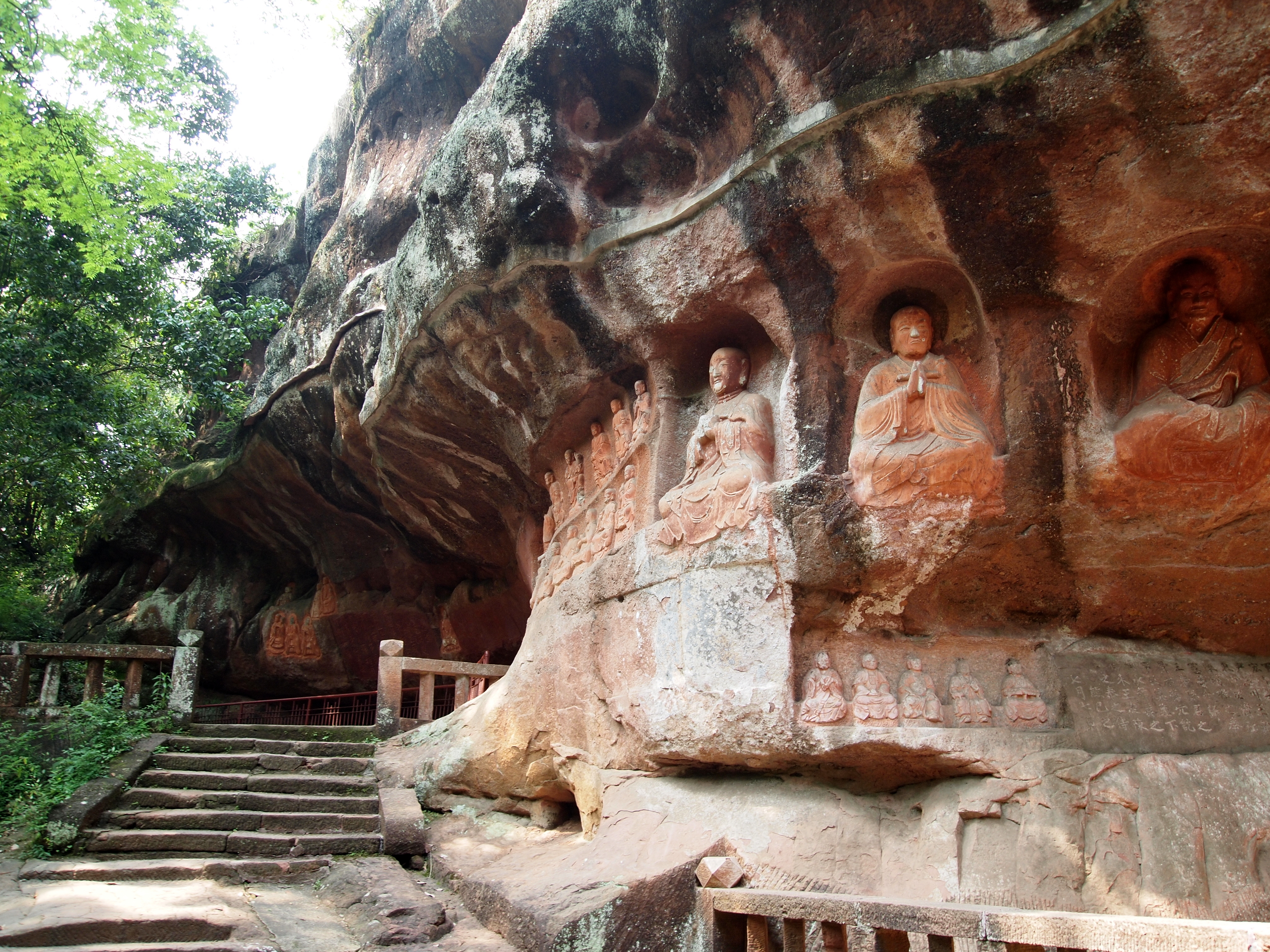
- Grottoes on Tongtian Rock
- Interactive map of Tongtian Rock
- Location: Ganzhou, Jiangxi

The Tongtian Rock (Chinese: 通天岩), or Tongtian Cliff, is a danxia landform scenic spot, located in Shuixi Town, Zhanggong District, Ganzhou City, Jiangxi Province, China. It is said that "in the north of China, there is Dunhuang Mogao Grottoes, in the south of China, there is Ganzhou Tongtian Rock".

The grottoes of Tongtian Rock were excavated in the Tang dynasty and flourished in the Northern Song dynasty. There are still 359 stone niche statues from the Tang dynasty to the Song dynasty and 128 stone carvings from the Song dynasty to the Republic of China, making it the largest Buddhist cave temple in the Jiangnan area and therefore known as the "First Grotto in the South of China".

Tongtian Rock is the southernmost grotto geographically located in Mainland China. Wang Yangming and other famous poets and literary men once carved inscriptions here.
