= Anyuan County =

Anyuan 安远县
- County
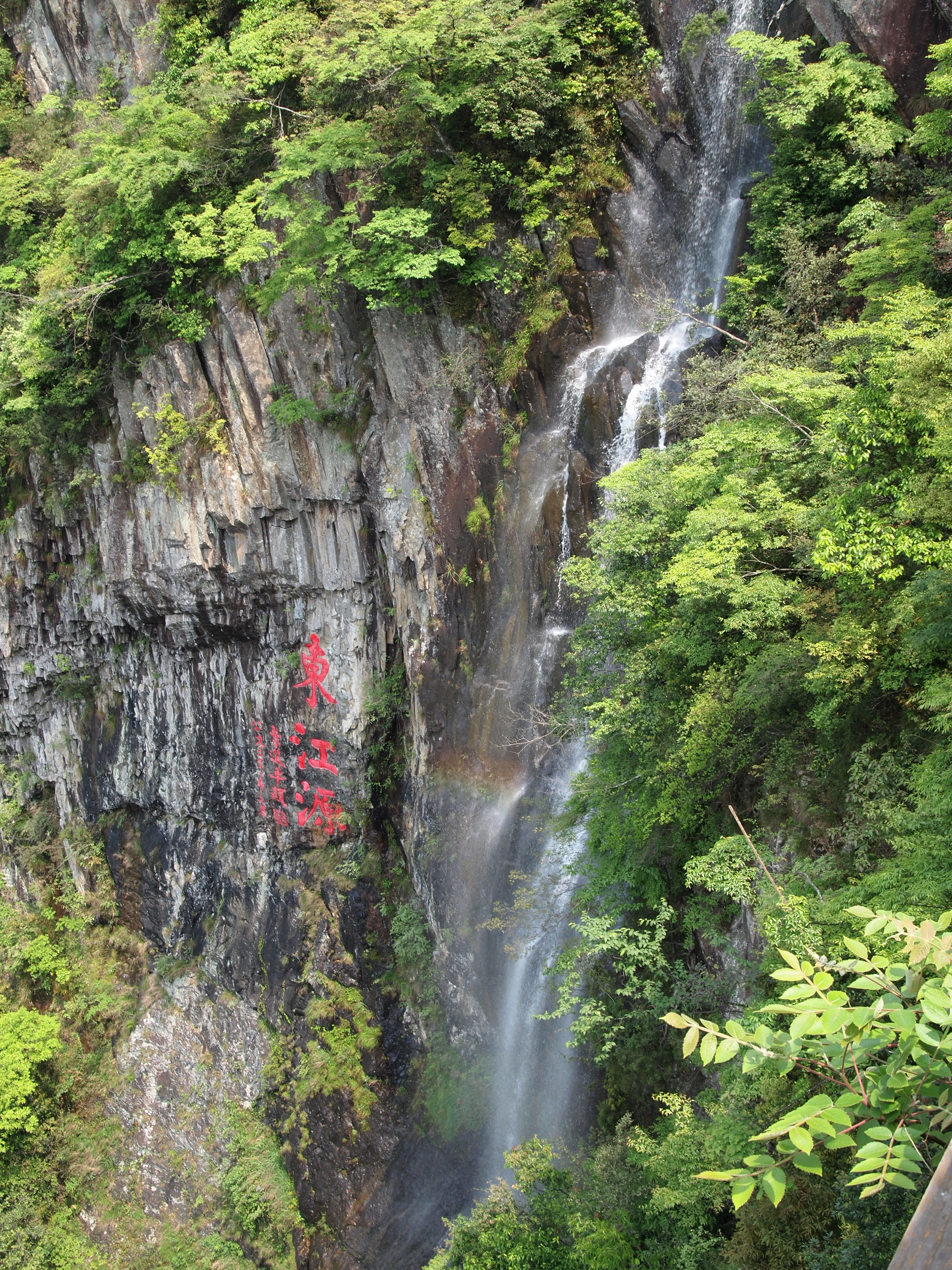
- Mount Sanbai, source of the Dongjiang River

- Location within Jiangxi
- Coordinates: 25.2458°N 115.3711°E
- Country: People's Republic of China
- Province: Jiangxi
- Prefecture-level city: Ganzhou

Area
  - Total: 2,374.59 km^{2} (916.83 sq mi)

Population (2012) based on hukou registration
  - Total: 382,855
  - Density: 161.230/km^{2} (417.584/sq mi)
- Postal Code: 342100
- Website: www.ay.gov.cn

Anyuan County (simplified Chinese: 安远县; traditional Chinese: 安遠縣; pinyin: Ānyuǎn Xiàn) is a rural county in the prefecture-level city of Ganzhou, Jiangxi. The county seat is at Xinshan Town (欣山镇), located 172 km (107 mi) southeast of Ganzhou proper.

== Transportation ==
The under construction Ruijin–Meizhou railway will pass through Anyuan.

== Administrative divisions ==
In the present, Anyuan County has 8 towns and 10 townships.

8 Towns

- Xinshan (欣山镇)
- Kongtian (孔田镇)
- Banshi (版石镇)
- Tianxin (天心镇)
- Longbu (龙布镇)
- Hezi (鹤子镇)
- Sanbaishan (三百山镇)
- Chetou (车头镇)

10 Townships

- Zhengang (镇岗乡)
- Fengshan (凤山乡)
- Xinlong (新龙乡)
- Caifang (蔡坊乡)
- Chongshi (重石乡)
- Changsha (长沙乡)
- Fucha (浮槎乡)
- Shuangyuan (浮芫乡)
- Tangcun (塘村乡)
- Gaoyunshan (高云山乡)

== Climate ==
Climate data for Anyuan, elevation 305 m (1,001 ft), (1991–2020 normals, extremes 1961–present)
Month	Jan	Feb	Mar	Apr	May	Jun	Jul	Aug	Sep	Oct	Nov	Dec	Year
Record high °C (°F)	26.7 (80.1)	30.0 (86.0)	30.9 (87.6)	33.8 (92.8)	35.2 (95.4)	36.8 (98.2)	38.5 (101.3)	38.0 (100.4)	36.6 (97.9)	34.4 (93.9)	34.0 (93.2)	27.9 (82.2)	38.5 (101.3)
Mean daily maximum °C (°F)	14.2 (57.6)	16.6 (61.9)	19.5 (67.1)	24.8 (76.6)	28.3 (82.9)	30.8 (87.4)	33.1 (91.6)	32.7 (90.9)	30.2 (86.4)	26.3 (79.3)	21.5 (70.7)	16.2 (61.2)	24.5 (76.1)
Daily mean °C (°F)	8.9 (48.0)	11.5 (52.7)	14.9 (58.8)	20.1 (68.2)	23.8 (74.8)	26.4 (79.5)	28.0 (82.4)	27.3 (81.1)	24.8 (76.6)	20.4 (68.7)	15.5 (59.9)	10.2 (50.4)	19.3 (66.8)
Mean daily minimum °C (°F)	5.5 (41.9)	8.0 (46.4)	11.6 (52.9)	16.7 (62.1)	20.5 (68.9)	23.4 (74.1)	24.2 (75.6)	23.7 (74.7)	21.2 (70.2)	16.4 (61.5)	11.5 (52.7)	6.4 (43.5)	15.8 (60.4)
Record low °C (°F)	−4.2 (24.4)	−2.9 (26.8)	−2.4 (27.7)	4.9 (40.8)	9.6 (49.3)	14.1 (57.4)	18.3 (64.9)	18.7 (65.7)	10.8 (51.4)	4.4 (39.9)	−1.1 (30.0)	−6.5 (20.3)	−6.5 (20.3)
Average precipitation mm (inches)	72.8 (2.87)	95.3 (3.75)	178.8 (7.04)	177.1 (6.97)	214.3 (8.44)	232.2 (9.14)	143.4 (5.65)	184.5 (7.26)	100.6 (3.96)	43.1 (1.70)	56.1 (2.21)	56.1 (2.21)	1,554.3 (61.2)
Average precipitation days (≥ 0.1 mm)	10.7	12.6	17.9	16.5	18.0	18.7	14.2	16.5	11.5	6.4	8.3	7.9	159.2
Average snowy days	0.4	0.4	0	0	0	0	0	0	0	0	0	0.2	1
Average relative humidity (%)	79	80	82	80	81	81	76	80	81	78	79	78	80
Mean monthly sunshine hours	94.0	84.5	73.7	93.2	114.3	129.7	214.3	184.3	152.7	155.1	132.3	125.1	1,553.2
Percentage possible sunshine	28	26	20	24	28	32	51	46	42	44	41	38	35
Source: China Meteorological Administrationall-time May low
