= Bajing Pavilion =

Building in Ganzhou, Jiangxi, China

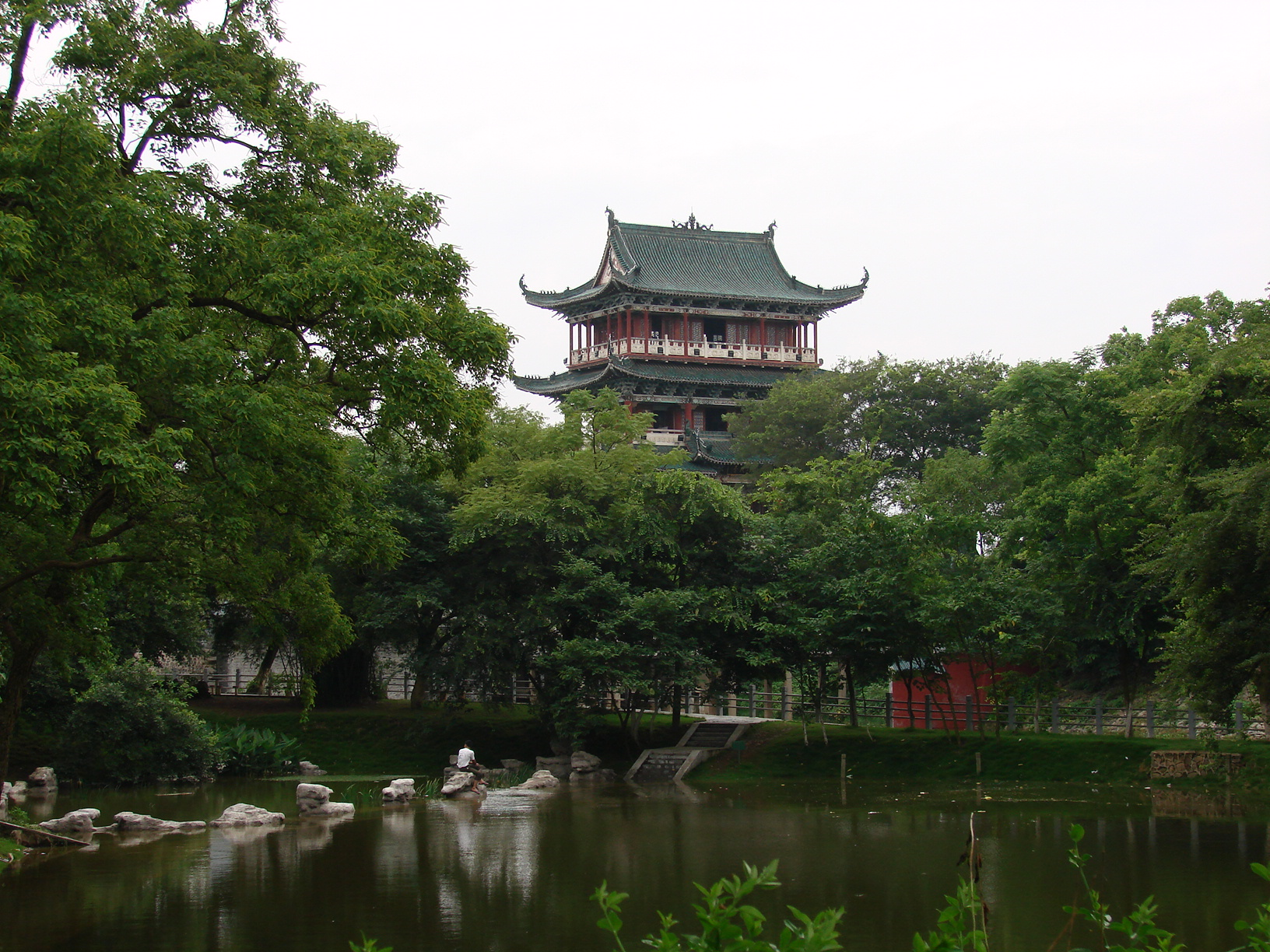
A distant view from Baijing Park

The Bajing Pavilion (Bajing Tai, 八境台 Bājìng Tái) in Ganzhou, Jiangxi province, China, is a three-level pavilion located on the northeast corner of the Ganzhou city wall. The Zhang River and Gong River join at a confluence as the Gan River at its base.

Bajing Pavilion was originally built by the municipal governor Kong Zonghan (孔宗翰) during the Jiayou era (嘉祐 Jiāyòu), 1056–1063, Song dynasty. In the following a thousand years, it was burnt down several times. The present pavilion was rebuilt in 1984 and opened in 1987. A 7.6-hectare area around the pavilion was adorned as Bajing Park in 1955.
