= Ganzhou–Longyan railway =

Railway line in China

Ganzhou–Longyan railway simplified Chinese: 赣龙铁路; traditional Chinese: 赣龍鐵路; pinyin: Gànlóng Tiělù

Overview
- Status: Open
- Owner: China Railway
- Locale: Ganzhou and Fujian, China
- Termini: Ganzhou; Longyan
- Stations: 19

Service
- Operator: CR Nanchang Group

Technical
- Line length: 290.1 km (180.3 mi)
- Num of tracks: 1
- Track gauge: 1,435 mm (4 ft 8 1/2 in)
- Operating speed: 120 kilometres per hour (75 mph) (Ganzhou section); 100 kilometres per hour (62 mph) (Fujian section )

The Ganzhou–Longyan railway or Ganlong railway (simplified Chinese: 赣龙铁路; traditional Chinese: 赣龍鐵路; pinyin: Gànlóng Tiělù) is a railway connecting Jiangxi and Fujian Provinces, in southeastern China. The line is named after its two terminal cities Ganzhou and Longyan, and has a total length of 290.1 km (180.3 mi). Construction began on December 8, 2001, and the line entered operation on October 1, 2005. Major cities and counties along route include Ganzhou, Ganxian, Yudu, Huichang, Ruijin in Jiangxi Province, and Changting, Liancheng, Shanghang, and Longyan in Fujian Province.

The line gives southern Fujian a direct link to the Beijing–Kowloon railway in neighboring Jiangxi, and reduced travel time from Longyan to Beijing by rail from 31 hours to 22 hours. A new double-track electrified alignment, known as the Ganzhou–Ruijin–Longyan railway, opened on December 26, 2015 with a line speed of 200 km/h (124 mph). The original route remains in operation for freight only.

== Line description ==
The Ganzhou–Longyan railway passes through mountainous terrain in southern Jiangxi and western Fujian and connects Ganzhou, on the Beijing–Kowloon railway, with Longyan, on the Longyan–Xiamen railway. The line provides southern Jiangxi with a rail outlet to the sea. The line's 148 bridges and 121 tunnels account for 35.48% of the line's total length.

Much of region along route was part of the Chinese Communists' guerilla base area in the early 1930s, including Ruijin, the capital of the Chinese Soviet Republic, and Changting, another stronghold of the Jiangxi–Fujian Soviet. Decades after the Communists departed the region on the Long March and then returned with the founding of the People's Republic, the region lagged in development and remained relatively isolated. The Ganzhou–Longyan railway was designed to promote economic development and boost tourism to historical sites in the region.

== History ==
A rail line connecting southern Jiangxi and Fujian was originally proposed by Sun Yat-sen and planning began in as early as 1914. The Nationalist government surveyed the region for railway planning in 1935, after driving the Communists from the region, and again in 1947 and 1948, after the end of World War II. After the winning the Chinese Civil War in 1949, the Communist government inherited the project and produced studies and proposals in 1958, 1963, 1972, 1981, 1983 and 1994. A feasibility study was finalized in 1997. Construction began in western Fujian on December 8, 2001, with a ceremony at the meeting site of the Gutian Conference, where the Communist leaders reorganized in 1929 after numerous setbacks in the wake of the Nanchang Uprising. Track-laying was completed on December 30, 2004, and the line entered operation on October 1, 2005, about one year ahead of schedule.

In September 2010, a project to expand capacity of the Ganlong line began with construction of a new double-track that is 272.832 km (169.5 mi) long. The new alignment has a line-speed of 200 km/h (124 mph). Originally hoped to open in 2014, it ultimately began operation on December 26, 2015. The original alignment now exclusively carries freight.

== Stations ==
The line has the following stations: Ganzhou, Yudu, Huichang North, Ruijin, Changting South, Guanzhaishan South, Guitianhuizhi, and Longyan.

== Rail connections ==
- Ganzhou: Beijing–Kowloon railway, Ganzhou–Shaoguan railway, future Nanchang-Shenzhen high-speed railway
- Longyan: Zhangping–Longchuan railway, Longyan–Xiamen railway

== See also ==
- List of railways in China
