= Xianxia, Anhui =

Xianxia 仙霞镇
- Town
- Location in China
- Coordinates: 30°24′22″N 119°17′8″E
- Country: People's Republic of China
- Province: Anhui
- Prefecture-level city: Xuancheng
- County-level city: Ningguo
- Time zone: UTC+8 (China Standard)

Xianxia (Chinese: 仙霞; pinyin: Xiānxiá) is a town in Ningguo, Anhui province, China. As of 2020, it administers the following seven villages:

- Xianxia Village
- Kongfu Village (孔夫村)
- Longting Village (龙亭村)
- Yangshan Village (杨山村)
- Panzhang Village (盘樟村)
- Longmen Village (龙门村)
- Shiling Village (石岭村)
