= Ganzhou–Shaoguan railway =

Railway line in China

The Ganzhou–Shaoguan railway (simplified Chinese: 赣韶铁路; traditional Chinese: 赣韶鐵路; pinyin: Gànsháo Tiělù) is a single-track electrified railway connecting Jiangxi and Guangdong Province in southeastern China. The line, also known as the Ganshao railway, is named after its two terminal cities Ganzhou and Shaoguan, and has a total length of 179 km (111 mi). Construction began in August 2009 and the line entered operation on September 30, 2014. Major cities and towns along route include Ganzhou, and Dayu County in Jiangxi and Nanxiong, Shixing and Shaoguan in Guangdong.

The line connects the Beijing–Guangzhou and Beijing–Kowloon railways and has reduced travel time by rail from Guangzhou to Nanchang by three hours.

== Rail connections ==
- Ganzhou: Beijing–Kowloon railway, Ganzhou–Longyan railway
- Shaoguan: Beijing–Guangzhou railway, Beijing–Guangzhou–Shenzhen–Hong Kong high-speed railway

== See also ==
- List of railways in China
