= Huichang County =

Huichang County 会昌县 Hweichang
- County
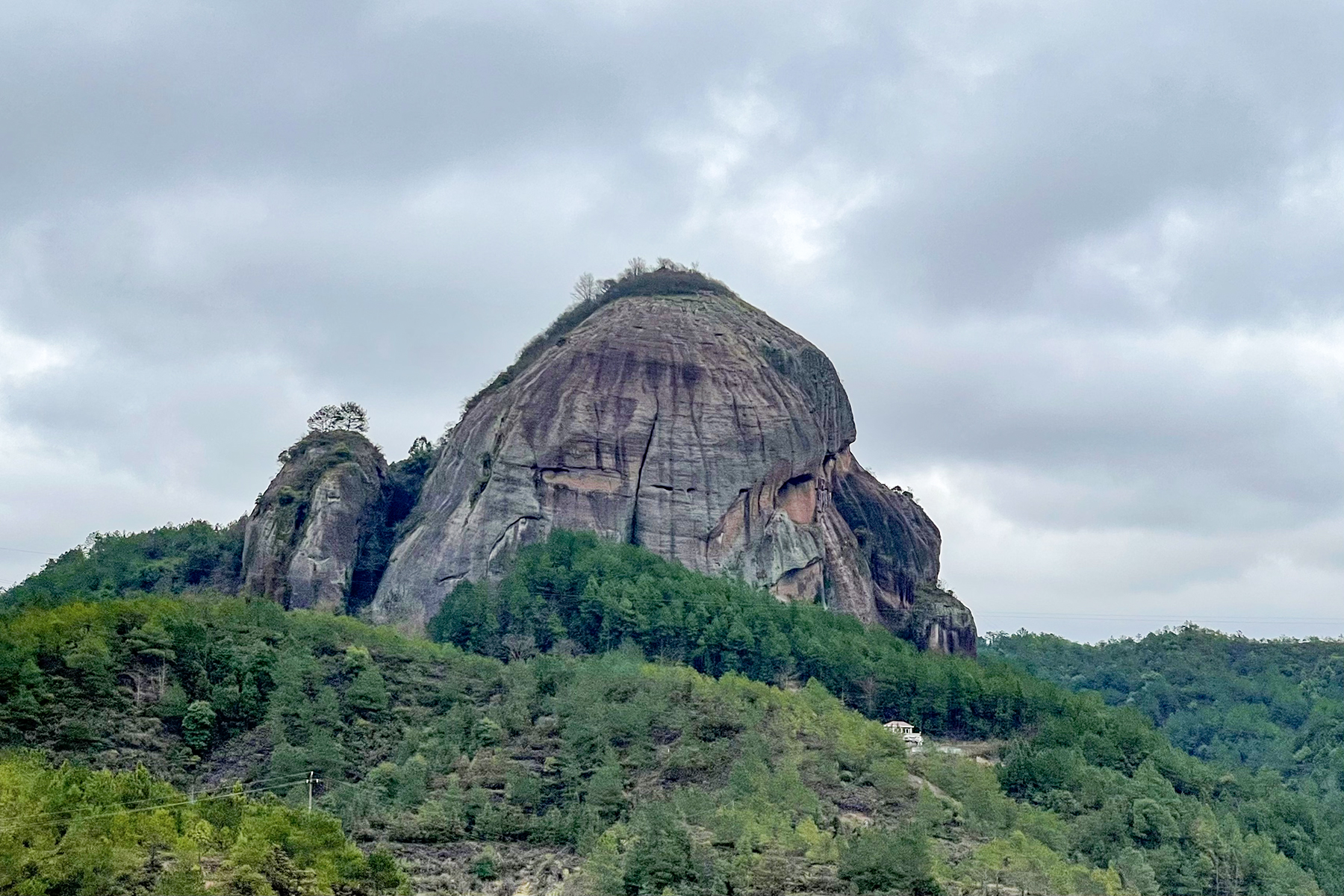
- Hanxianyan Mountain

- Location in Jiangxi
- Coordinates: 25°27′46″N 115°44′35″E
- Country: People's Republic of China
- Province: Jiangxi
- Prefecture-level city: Ganzhou
- Seat: Wenwuba Town

Area
  - Total: 2,722.18 km^{2} (1,051.04 sq mi)

Population (2010)
  - Total: 445,137
  - Density: 163.522/km^{2} (423.521/sq mi)
- Postal Code: 342600
- Area code: 0797
- Vehicle registration: 赣B
- Website: www.huichang.gov.cn

Huichang County (simplified Chinese: 会昌县; traditional Chinese: 會昌縣; pinyin: Huìchāng Xiàn) is a county, under the jurisdiction of Ganzhou, in the south of Jiangxi province, People's Republic of China.

== Population ==
The population of Huichang is 445,137 (2010), including nations of Han (partly Hakka) and She.

== Administration ==
Huichang has jurisdiction over 6 towns and 13 townships. The seat of the county locates at the Wenwuba Town.

6 Towns

- Wenwuba (文武坝镇)
- Junmenling (筠门岭镇)
- Xijiang (西江镇)
- Zhoutian (周田镇)
- Mazhou (麻州镇)
- Zhuangkou (庄口镇)

13 Townships

- Qingxi (清溪乡)
- Youshui (右水乡)
- Gaopai (高排乡)
- Xiaolong (晓龙乡)
- Zhulan (珠兰乡)
- Dongtou (洞头乡)
- Zhongcun (中村乡)
- Zhantang (站塘乡)
- Yonglong (永隆乡)
- Fucheng (富城乡)
- Xiaomi (小密乡)
- Zhuangbu (庄埠乡)
- Bai'e (白鹅乡)

== Geography ==
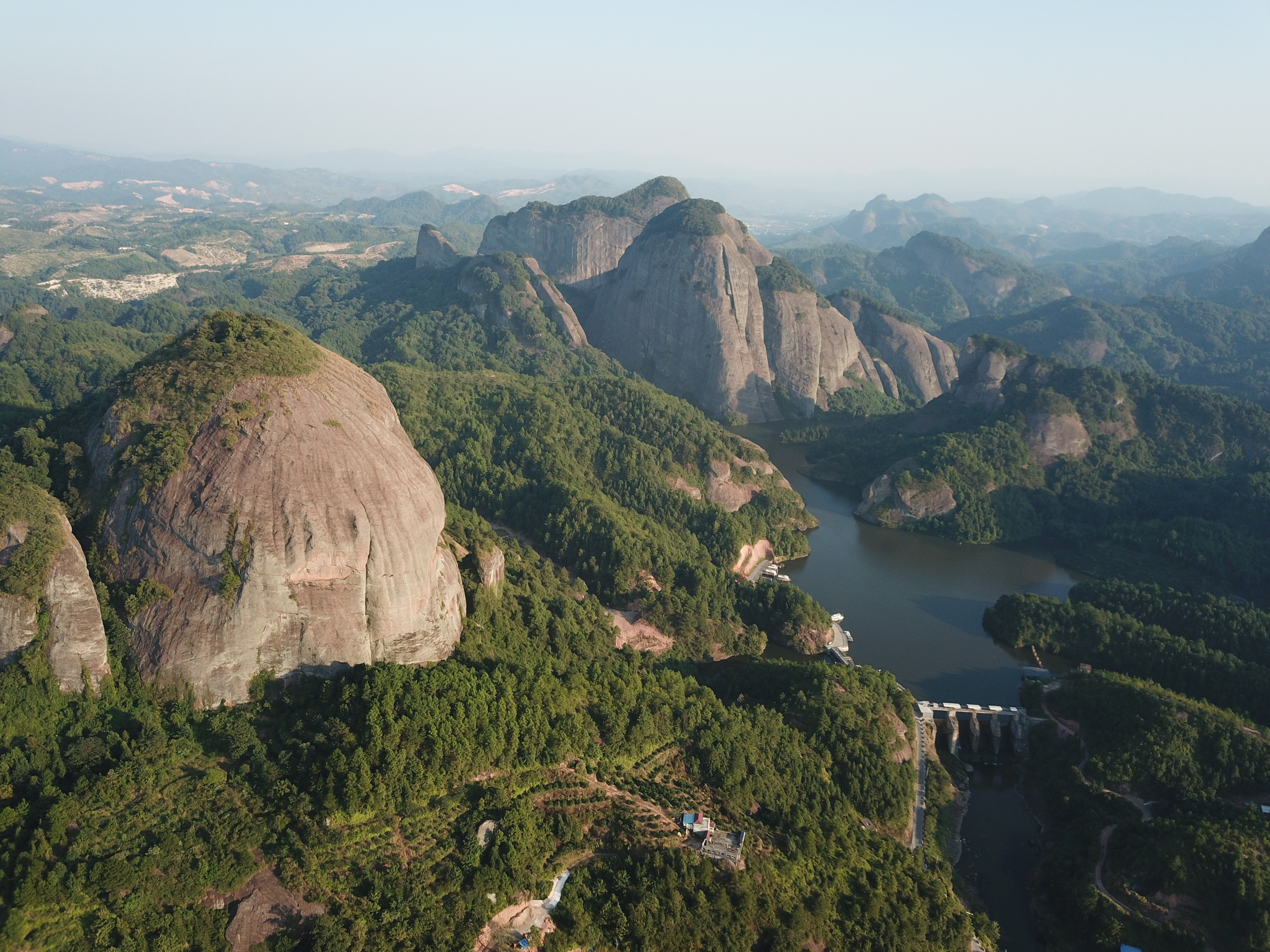
Hanxianyan（汉仙岩）.

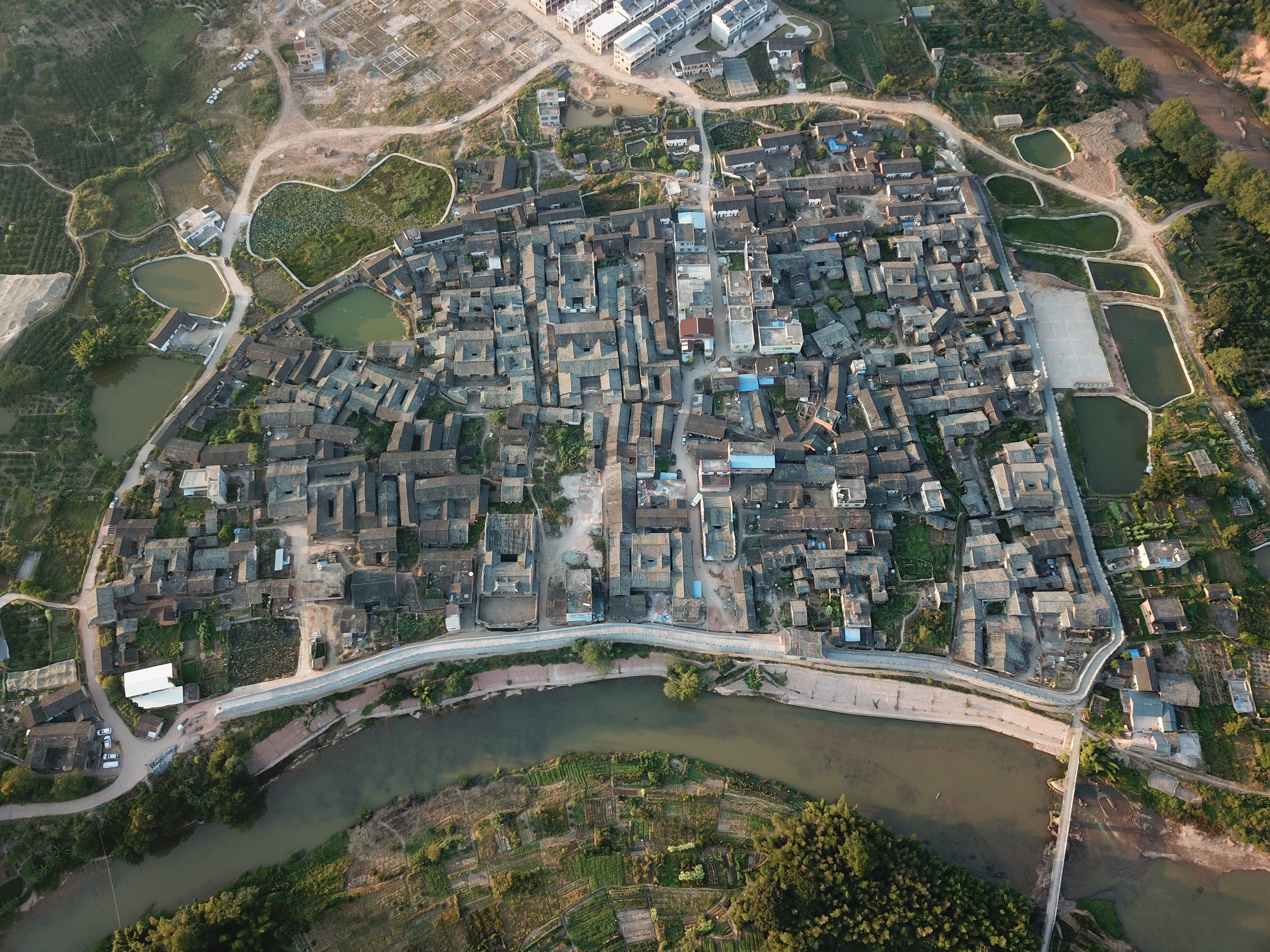
Yangjiaoshuibao（羊角水堡）

Huichang is located in the southeast of Jiangxi province. The Xiang River and the Mian River merge here and form the Gong River.

Huichang has an area of 2722.18 km^{2}.

== Climate ==
Climate data for Huichang, elevation 167 m (548 ft), (1991–2020 normals, extremes 1981–present)
Month	Jan	Feb	Mar	Apr	May	Jun	Jul	Aug	Sep	Oct	Nov	Dec	Year
Record high °C (°F)	28.9 (84.0)	31.9 (89.4)	32.2 (90.0)	34.7 (94.5)	36.5 (97.7)	38.3 (100.9)	39.7 (103.5)	40.0 (104.0)	38.5 (101.3)	36.2 (97.2)	34.6 (94.3)	29.0 (84.2)	40.0 (104.0)
Mean daily maximum °C (°F)	14.2 (57.6)	16.9 (62.4)	19.9 (67.8)	25.6 (78.1)	29.2 (84.6)	31.8 (89.2)	34.5 (94.1)	33.9 (93.0)	31.2 (88.2)	27.2 (81.0)	22.1 (71.8)	16.3 (61.3)	25.2 (77.4)
Daily mean °C (°F)	8.9 (48.0)	11.5 (52.7)	14.9 (58.8)	20.4 (68.7)	24.2 (75.6)	26.9 (80.4)	28.8 (83.8)	28.1 (82.6)	25.8 (78.4)	21.2 (70.2)	15.9 (60.6)	10.4 (50.7)	19.8 (67.5)
Mean daily minimum °C (°F)	5.6 (42.1)	8.1 (46.6)	11.7 (53.1)	16.8 (62.2)	20.7 (69.3)	23.6 (74.5)	24.7 (76.5)	24.4 (75.9)	22.0 (71.6)	17.0 (62.6)	11.8 (53.2)	6.5 (43.7)	16.1 (60.9)
Record low °C (°F)	−5.7 (21.7)	−3.0 (26.6)	−2.8 (27.0)	5.2 (41.4)	10.4 (50.7)	15.9 (60.6)	19.7 (67.5)	19.5 (67.1)	12.5 (54.5)	4.7 (40.5)	−0.6 (30.9)	−7.0 (19.4)	−7.0 (19.4)
Average precipitation mm (inches)	74.4 (2.93)	102.2 (4.02)	192.2 (7.57)	195.9 (7.71)	240.6 (9.47)	254.5 (10.02)	132.9 (5.23)	182.4 (7.18)	90.9 (3.58)	47.0 (1.85)	62.0 (2.44)	55.7 (2.19)	1,630.7 (64.19)
Average precipitation days (≥ 0.1 mm)	11.1	13.2	18.7	16.6	17.7	17.9	13.4	15.6	9.6	6.1	8.0	8.9	156.8
Average snowy days	0.7	0.6	0.1	0	0	0	0	0	0	0	0	0.2	1.6
Average relative humidity (%)	80	80	82	80	80	81	75	78	78	76	78	78	79
Mean monthly sunshine hours	85.4	81.9	74.0	99.6	117.6	135.5	222.4	197.6	164.5	158.2	128.9	117.4	1,583
Percentage possible sunshine	26	26	20	26	28	33	53	49	45	45	40	36	36
Source: China Meteorological Administrationall-time extreme temperatureall-time May low

== Transport ==
- Ganzhou–Longyan Railway
