= Ruijin–Meizhou railway =

Planned railway line in Jiangxi, China

The Ruijin–Meizhou railway (Chinese: 瑞梅铁路; pinyin: ruì méi tiě lù) is a railway line currently under construction in Jiangxi, China. The line will be 240.3 kilometres (149.3 mi) long and have a maximum speed of 160 kilometres per hour (99 mph). In May 2024, it was expected the line would be completed in 2027.

The northern terminus of the line is Ruijin railway station while the southern terminus is Meizhou railway station.
