= Zhanggong, Ganzhou =

Zhanggong 章贡区
- District
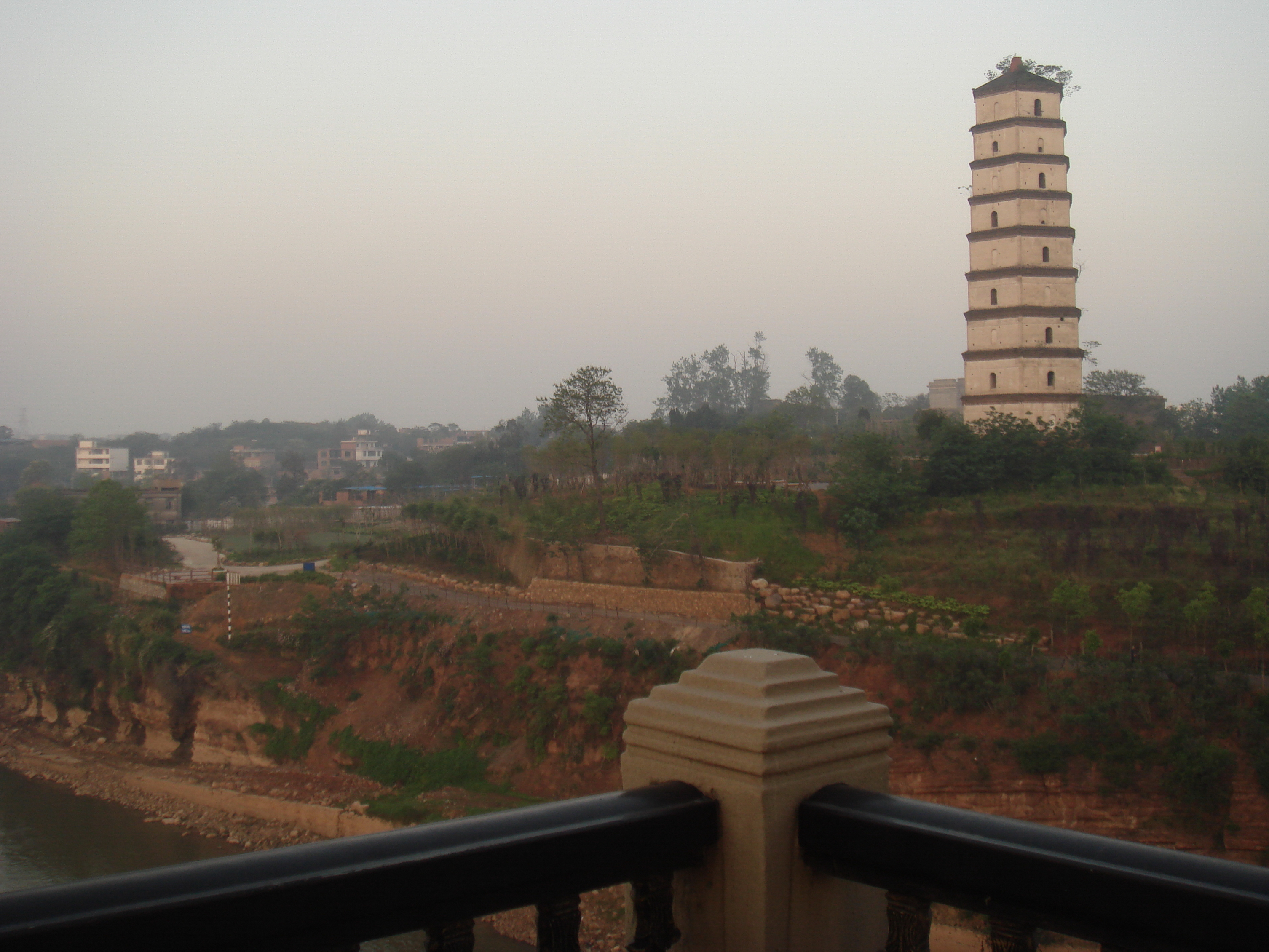

- Location in Jiangxi
- Coordinates: 25°50′52″N 114°54′07″E
- Country: People's Republic of China
- Province: Jiangxi
- Prefecture-level city: Ganzhou

Area
  - Total: 479 km^{2} (185 sq mi)

Population (2021)
  - Total: 768,996
  - Density: 1,610/km^{2} (4,160/sq mi)
- Postal Code: 341000
- Language: Ganzhou dialect

Zhanggong District (simplified Chinese: 章贡区; traditional Chinese: 章貢區; pinyin: Zhānggòng Qū) is the administrative center of the prefecture-level city of Ganzhou in the south of Jiangxi Province, China. The oldest part of Ganzhou's ancient sewage system named Fushou Gou (福寿沟; 'Happiness and Longevity Ditch'), which was built during the eleventh century AD and still in use today, is located in Zhanggong District.

As of 2021, the district covers an area of 479 square kilometers, and has a population of 768,996.

== Administrative divisions ==
In the present, Zhanggong District has 7 subdistricts and 8 townships.

7 subdistricts

- Jiefang (解放街道)
- Ganjiang (赣江街道)
- Nanwai (南外街道)
- Dongwai (东外街道)
- Huangjinling (黄金岭街道)
- Zhangjiang (章江街道)
- Shuinan (水南街道)

8 towns

- Shashi (沙石镇)
- Shuidong (水东镇)
- Hubian (湖边镇)
- Shahe (沙河镇)
- Shuixi (水西镇)
- Panlong (蟠龙镇)
- Tandong (潭东镇)
- Tankou (潭口镇)

== Transportation ==
Ganzhou railway station is located here.
