= Ganzhou =

Ganzhou 赣州市 Kanchow
- Prefecture-level city
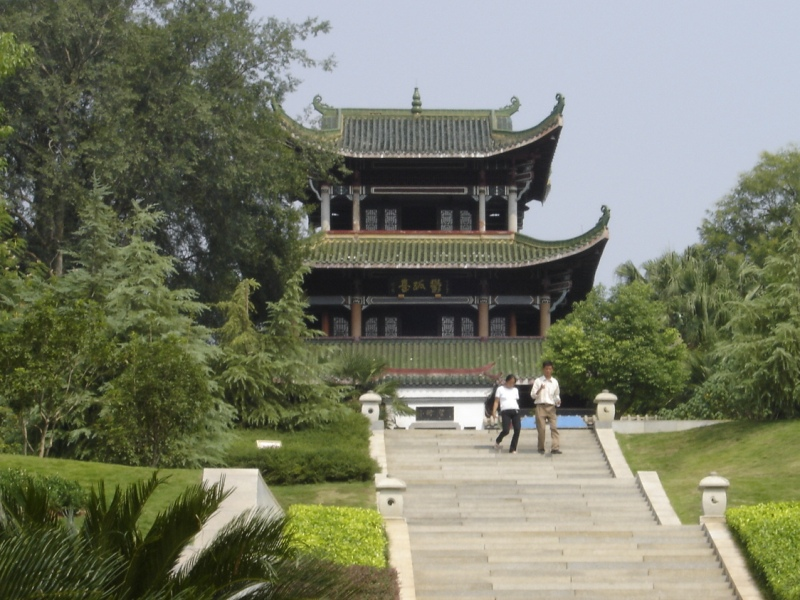
- Yugu Pavilion

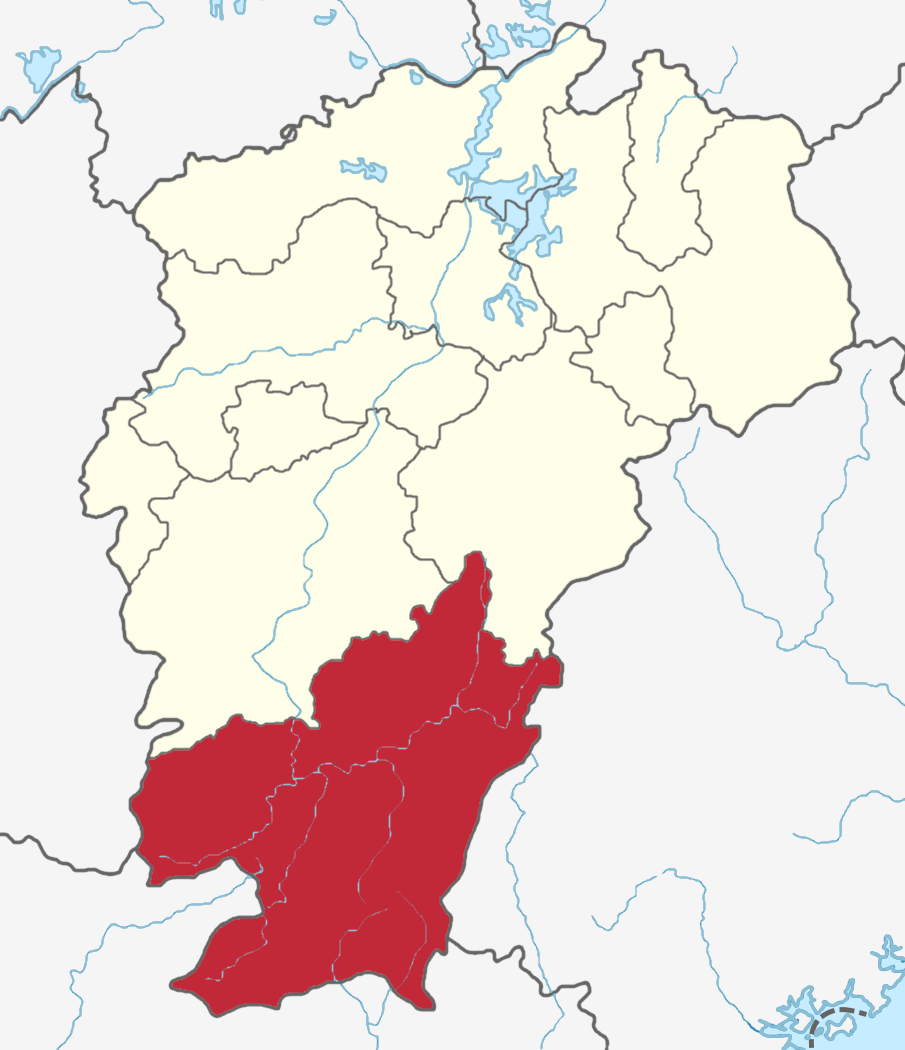
- Location of Ganzhou City jurisdiction in Jiangxi

- Location within China
- Coordinates (Ganzhou municipal government): 25°49′52″N 114°55′59″E
- Country: People's Republic of China
- Province: Jiangxi
- Settled: 236 AD
- Municipal seat: Zhanggong District

Government
  - Mayor (deputy): Zeng Wenming
  - Secretary: Li Bingjun

Area
  - Prefecture-level city: 39,379.64 km^{2} (15,204.56 sq mi)
  - Urban: 5,316.8 km^{2} (2,052.8 sq mi)
  - Metro: 5,316.8 km^{2} (2,052.8 sq mi)
- Elevation: 107 m (351 ft)

Population (2020 census)
  - Prefecture-level city: 8,970,014
  - Density: 227.7830/km^{2} (589.9554/sq mi)
  - Urban: 2,588,060
  - Urban density: 486.77/km^{2} (1,260.7/sq mi)
  - Metro: 2,588,060
  - Metro density: 486.77/km^{2} (1,260.7/sq mi)

GDP
  - Prefecture-level city: CN¥ 347.4 billion US$ 53.5 billion
  - Per capita: CN¥ 35,342; US$ 5,440
- Time zone: UTC+8 (China Standard)
- Postal code: 341000
- Area code: 0797
- ISO 3166 code: CN-JX-07
- Vehicle registration plate prefixes: 赣B
- Administrative division code: 360700
- Website: ganzhou.gov.cn

Ganzhou (Chinese: 赣州; pinyin: Gànzhōu, Hakka: Kam-chû-sṳ), alternately romanized as Kanchow, is a prefecture-level city in the south of Jiangxi province, China, bordering Fujian to the east, Guangdong to the south, and Hunan to the west. Its administrative seat is at Zhanggong District.

== History ==
=== Early settlement and administration ===
In 201 CE, Emperor Gaozu of Han established a county in the territory of modern Ganzhou. In 236 CE, during the Three Kingdoms period, the Luling Commandery was established in the area. In the early years, Han Chinese settlement and authority in the area was minimal and largely restricted to the Gan River basin. The river, a tributary of the Yangtze via Poyang Lake, provided a route of communication from the north as well as irrigation for rice farming.

=== Sui dynasty ===
In 589 CE, during the Sui dynasty, the Nankang Commandery was abolished, and the area was reorganized as Qianzhou. During the Song, immigration from the north bolstered the local population and drove local aboriginal tribes into admixing with the northerners. After the fall of the capital to the Jin in 1126 in the Jingkang Incident, immigration increased dramatically.

=== Song dynasty ===
In 1153, under the Southern Song, Qianzhou was abolished, and re-organized as Ganzhou, the same name as the present-day city.

=== Yuan dynasty ===
In 1277, under the Yuan dynasty, the area was reorganized as Ganzhou Circuit. Near the end of the Yuan dynasty, in 1365, Ganzhou Circuit was reorganized again as Ganzhou Fu, which it remained until 1912.

=== Qing dynasty ===
During the late 1800s Ganzhou was opened as one of the southern treaty ports and became a minor base for foreign companies.

=== Republic of China ===
In 1912, the Republic of China abolished the area's dynasty-era subdivisions, replacing them all with counties administered by the provincial government of Jiangxi. In 1914, the province of Jiangxi was divided into four circuits (Chinese: 道; pinyin: Dào), one of which being Gannan Circuit, which ruled the area of present-day Ganzhou. In 1926, Gannan Circuit was abolished, and its counties were again directly administered by the Jiangxi provincial government. In 1932, the province established Administrative Inspectorates, and the area of present-day Ganzhou was split between the 9th, 11th, 12th, and 13th Administrative Inspectorates. In subsequent years, the area would be reorganized to be divided between various Administrative Inspectorates.

==== Chinese Soviet Republic ====
Beginning in 1928, the Chinese Communist Party began operating in the area, and by June 1930, a local soviet had formed and began governing a number of counties in the region. In November 1931, the Chinese Soviet Republic was proclaimed in Yeping, in the then-county of Ruijin. During the subsequent years, Ganzhou was governed by the Jiangxi–Fujian Soviet. Beginning in February 1934, Communist Party forces in the area began to lose territory to Kuomintang forces (Fifth encirclement). From then until March 1935, the Soviet gradually lost territory with only five northeastern counties left in Ganzhou as of early October 1934 until it collapsed.

==== Gannan New Deal ====
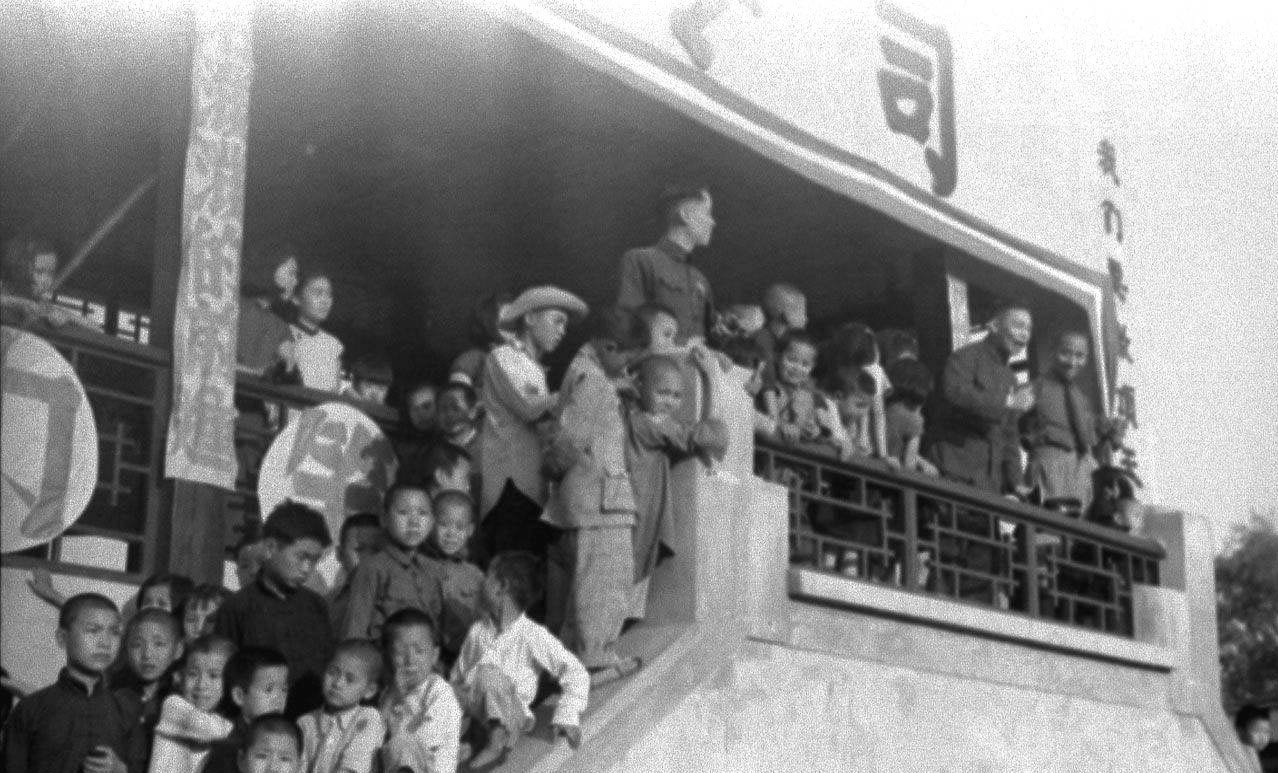
Chiang Ching-kuo in Ganzhou

Between 1939 and 1945, Chiang Ching-kuo, son of Chiang Kai-shek, was appointed by the Government of the Republic of China as commissioner of Ganzhou Prefecture (mountain South), then the name of the surrounding regions of Ganzhou. There he banned opium smoking, gambling and prostitution, studied governmental management, allowed for economic expansion and a change in social outlook. His efforts were hailed as a miracle in the political war in China, then coined as the "Gannan New Deal" (Chinese: 贛南新政). During his time in Gannan, from 1940 he implemented a "public information desk" where ordinary people could visit him if they had problems, and according to records, Chiang Ching-kuo received a total of 1,023 people during such sessions in 1942. In regards to the ban on prostitution and closing of brothels, Chiang implemented a policy where former prostitutes became employed in factories. Due to the large number of refugees in Ganzhou as a result from the ongoing war, thousands of orphans lived on the street; in June 1942, Chiang Ching-kuo formally established the Chinese Children's Village (Chinese: 中華兒童新村) in the outskirts of Ganzhou, with facilities such as a nursery, kindergarten, primary school, hospital and gymnasium.

=== People's Republic of China ===
On August 14, 1949, the People's Liberation Army established control of Gan County. In June 1951, Ganzhou Prefecture (simplified Chinese: 赣州专区; traditional Chinese: 贛州專區) was established.

In February 1999, Ganzhou was changed from a prefecture to a prefecture-level city.

== Administration ==
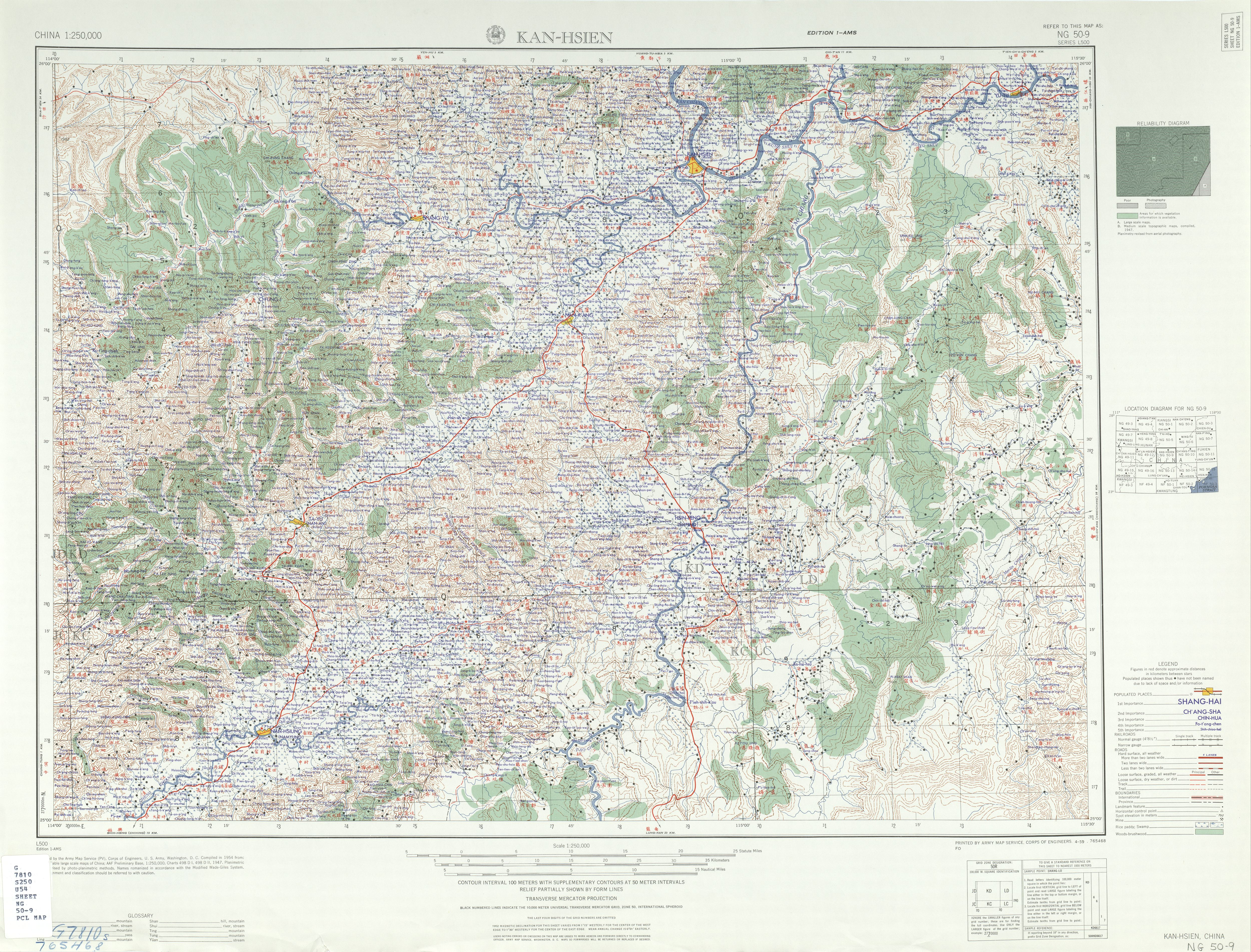
Map including Ganzhou (labeled as KAN-HSIEN 贛縣) (AMS, 1954)

Ganzhou has jurisdiction over 3 districts, 2 county-level cities, 13 counties:

District

- Zhanggong District (章贡区)
- Nankang District (南康区)
- Ganxian District (赣县区)

County-level cities

- Ruijin (瑞金市)
- Longnan (龙南市)

Counties

- Yudu County (于都县)
- Xingguo County (兴国县)
- Ningdu County (宁都县)
- Shicheng County (石城县)
- Huichang County (会昌县)
- Xunwu County (寻乌县)
- Anyuan County (安远县)
- Dingnan County (定南县)
- Quannan County (全南县)
- Xinfeng County (信丰县)
- Dayu County (大余县)
- Chongyi County (崇义县)
- Shangyou County (上犹县)

Map
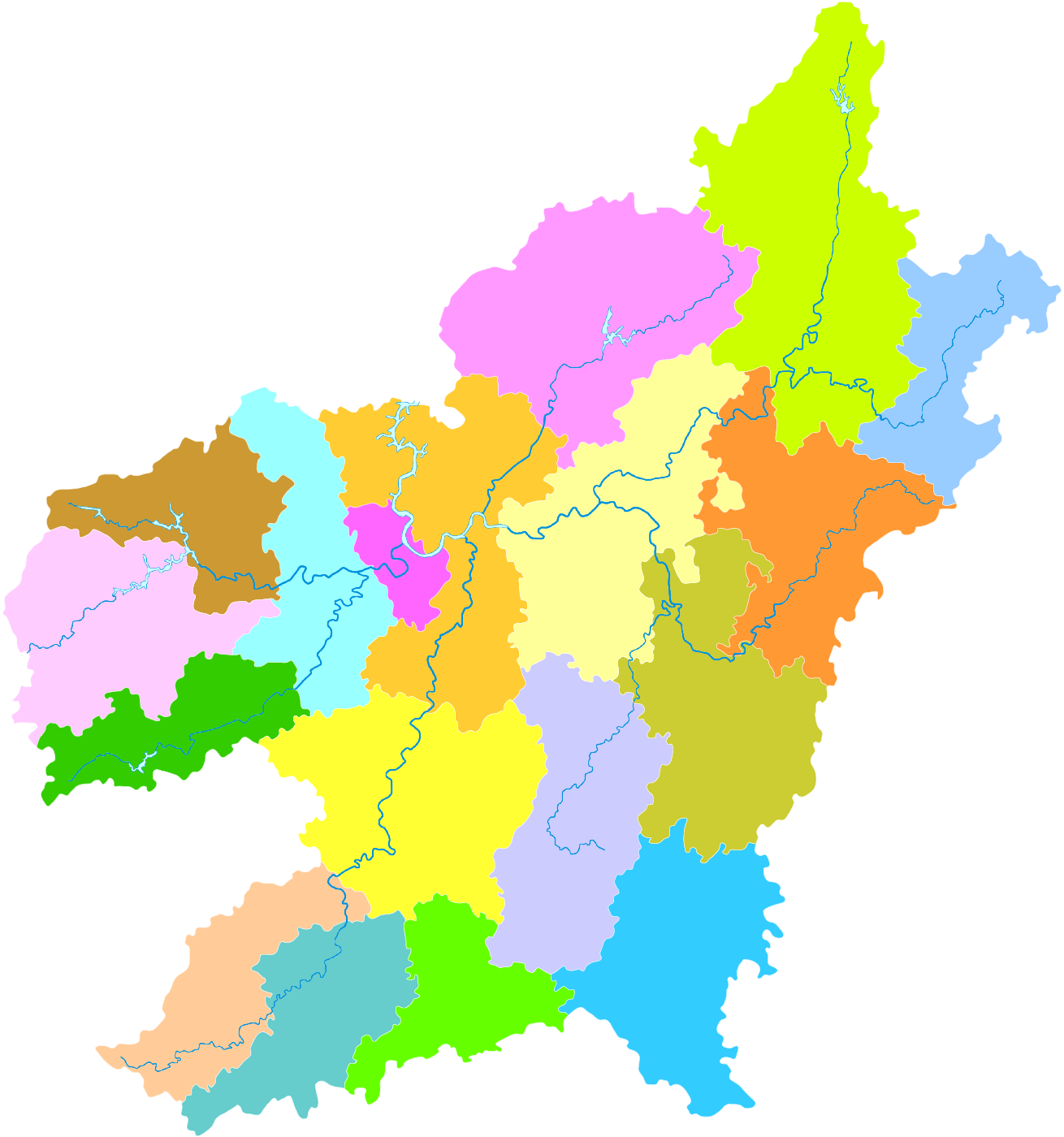

== Geography ==
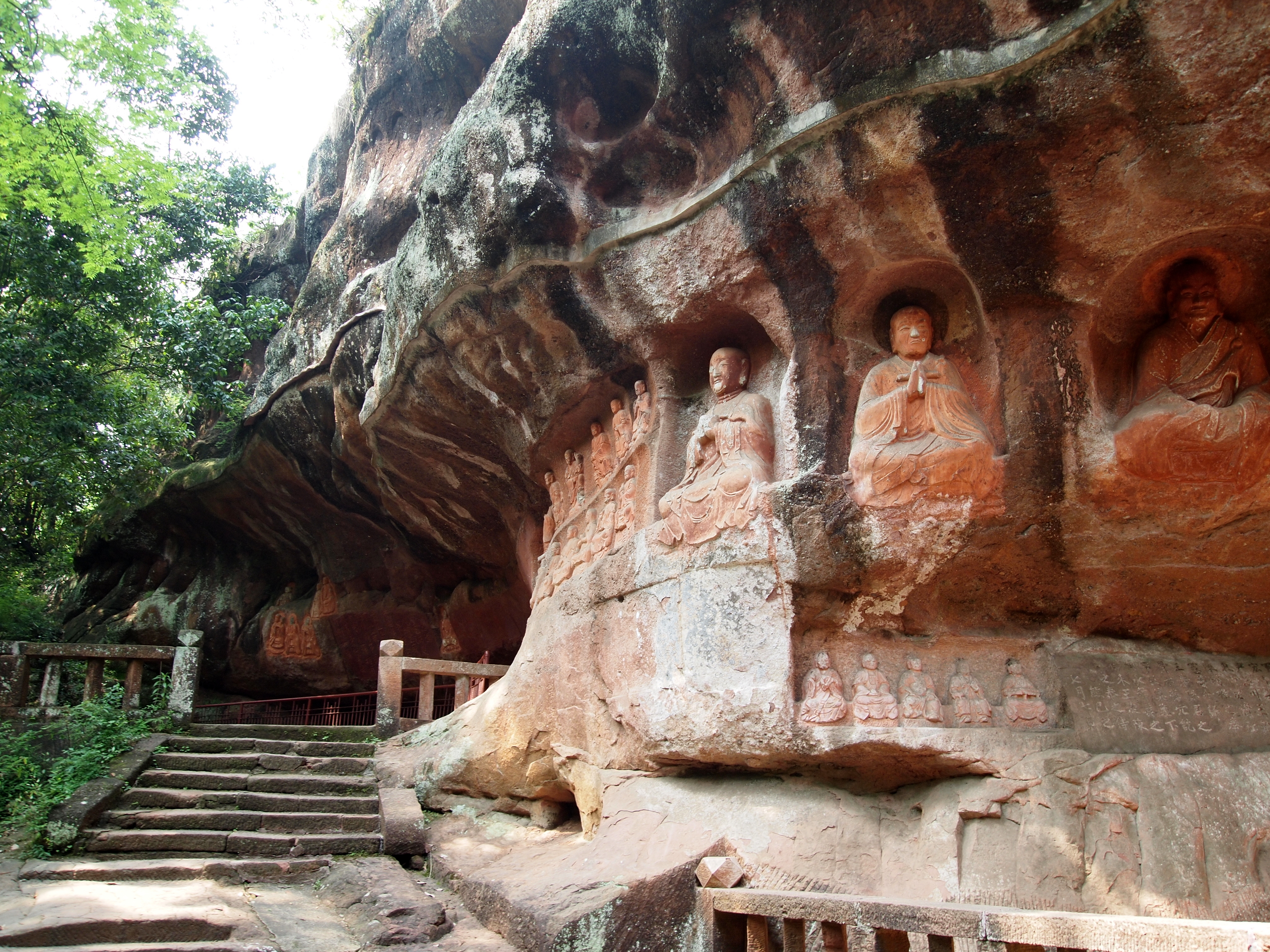
The Tongtianyan Grottoes (通天岩石窟) in Ganzhou

Ganzhou is located in the upper reaches of Ganjiang River, in the south of Jiangxi Province, referred to as Gannan. The geographical coordinates of Ganzhou City are 114.93° east longitude and 25.83° north latitude. Ganzhou is a large city covering the southern third of Jiangxi, with an area of 39,400 square kilometres (15,200 sq mi). More than 70% of its administrative area is forested, and over 83% is also mountainous. Several of the major tributaries of the Gan River, Ganzhou's namesake, join at a confluence in the center of the city. Bordering prefecture-level cities are:

Fujian:

- Sanming – east
- Longyan – east

Guangdong:

- Meizhou – south
- Heyuan – south
- Shaoguan – south

Hunan:

- Chenzhou – west

Jiangxi:

- Ji'an – north
- Fuzhou – north

=== Climate ===
Ganzhou has a humid subtropical climate (Köppen Cfa) affected by the East Asian monsoon, with long, humid, very hot summers and cool and drier winters with occasional cold snaps. The monthly 24-hour average temperature ranges from 8.2 °C (46.8 °F) in January to 29.5 °C (85.1 °F) in July, with an annual average of 19.57 °C (67.2 °F). The average annual precipitation is around 1,450 mm (57 in). With monthly percent possible sunshine ranging from 20% in March to 62% in July, the city receives 1,778 hours of bright sunshine annually. Winter begins somewhat sunny and dry but becomes progressively wetter and cloudier; spring begins especially gloomy, and from March to June each of the months averages more than 170 mm (6.7 in) of rainfall. After the heavy rains subside in June, summer is especially sunny. Autumn is warm and relatively dry.

Climate data for Ganzhou (Ganxian District), elevation 138 m (453 ft), (1991–2020 normals, extremes 1951–present)
| Month | Jan | Feb | Mar | Apr | May | Jun | Jul | Aug | Sep | Oct | Nov | Dec | Year |
|---|---|---|---|---|---|---|---|---|---|---|---|---|---|
| Record high °C (°F) | 27.7 (81.9) | 31.4 (88.5) | 33.2 (91.8) | 35.1 (95.2) | 37.9 (100.2) | 38.4 (101.1) | 40.0 (104.0) | 41.2 (106.2) | 38.8 (101.8) | 39.6 (103.3) | 32.8 (91.0) | 29.1 (84.4) | 41.2 (106.2) |
| Mean daily maximum °C (°F) | 12.6 (54.7) | 15.5 (59.9) | 18.7 (65.7) | 25.0 (77.0) | 29.1 (84.4) | 31.8 (89.2) | 34.7 (94.5) | 34.1 (93.4) | 30.9 (87.6) | 26.6 (79.9) | 21.1 (70.0) | 15.1 (59.2) | 24.6 (76.3) |
| Daily mean °C (°F) | 8.4 (47.1) | 11.0 (51.8) | 14.4 (57.9) | 20.3 (68.5) | 24.5 (76.1) | 27.4 (81.3) | 29.7 (85.5) | 29.0 (84.2) | 26.2 (79.2) | 21.5 (70.7) | 16.0 (60.8) | 10.3 (50.5) | 19.9 (67.8) |
| Mean daily minimum °C (°F) | 5.7 (42.3) | 8.0 (46.4) | 11.4 (52.5) | 16.9 (62.4) | 21.1 (70.0) | 24.3 (75.7) | 26.0 (78.8) | 25.5 (77.9) | 22.8 (73.0) | 17.9 (64.2) | 12.5 (54.5) | 7.0 (44.6) | 16.6 (61.9) |
| Record low °C (°F) | −6.0 (21.2) | −4.4 (24.1) | −0.3 (31.5) | 4.2 (39.6) | 11.1 (52.0) | 15.6 (60.1) | 19.1 (66.4) | 19.7 (67.5) | 13.1 (55.6) | 5.2 (41.4) | −0.4 (31.3) | −3.8 (25.2) | −6.0 (21.2) |
| Average precipitation mm (inches) | 71.6 (2.82) | 96.2 (3.79) | 173.5 (6.83) | 161.6 (6.36) | 224.5 (8.84) | 205.4 (8.09) | 135.2 (5.32) | 154.3 (6.07) | 75.8 (2.98) | 48.7 (1.92) | 65.6 (2.58) | 50.9 (2.00) | 1,463.3 (57.6) |
| Average precipitation days (≥ 0.1 mm) | 11.7 | 13.0 | 18.2 | 16.2 | 16.9 | 16.0 | 11.4 | 13.6 | 9.3 | 6.0 | 7.9 | 9.0 | 149.2 |
| Average snowy days | 1.3 | 1.0 | 0.1 | 0 | 0 | 0 | 0 | 0 | 0 | 0 | 0 | 0.4 | 2.8 |
| Average relative humidity (%) | 76 | 76 | 79 | 76 | 76 | 76 | 69 | 72 | 73 | 70 | 73 | 73 | 74 |
| Mean monthly sunshine hours | 82.7 | 84.0 | 79.9 | 114.4 | 139.9 | 162.6 | 253.3 | 223.0 | 175.3 | 168.0 | 139.0 | 124.4 | 1,746.5 |
| Percentage possible sunshine | 25 | 26 | 21 | 30 | 34 | 40 | 61 | 56 | 48 | 47 | 43 | 38 | 39 |
Source: China Meteorological Administration extremes

== Demographics ==
Ganzhou has a total population of 7.94 million, mainly composed of Han, She, Hui, Manchu, Mongolian, Zhuang and other ethnic groups.

Its population was 8,970,014 at the 2020 Chinese census whom 2,588,060 in the built-up (or metro) area made of Zhanggong, Nankang, and Ganxian Districts.

As of 2019, Ganzhou's birth rate is 12.96 per 1,000.

== Economy ==
As of 2021, Ganzhou's gross domestic product (GDP) totaled ¥416.9 billion, an 9.5% increase from the previous year. Of this, ¥37.632 billion (10.83%) came from the city's primary sector, ¥136.819 billion (39.38%) came from the city's secondary sector, and ¥172.983 billion came (49.79%) from the city's tertiary sector. The city's GDP per capita totaled ¥35,341.74.

As of 2019, the per capita disposable income of the Ganzhou's urban residents totaled ¥34,826, and the per capita disposable income of the Ganzhou's rural residents totaled ¥11,941.

In 2011, Ganzhou's gross domestic product totaled ¥133.598 billion.

== Tourism ==
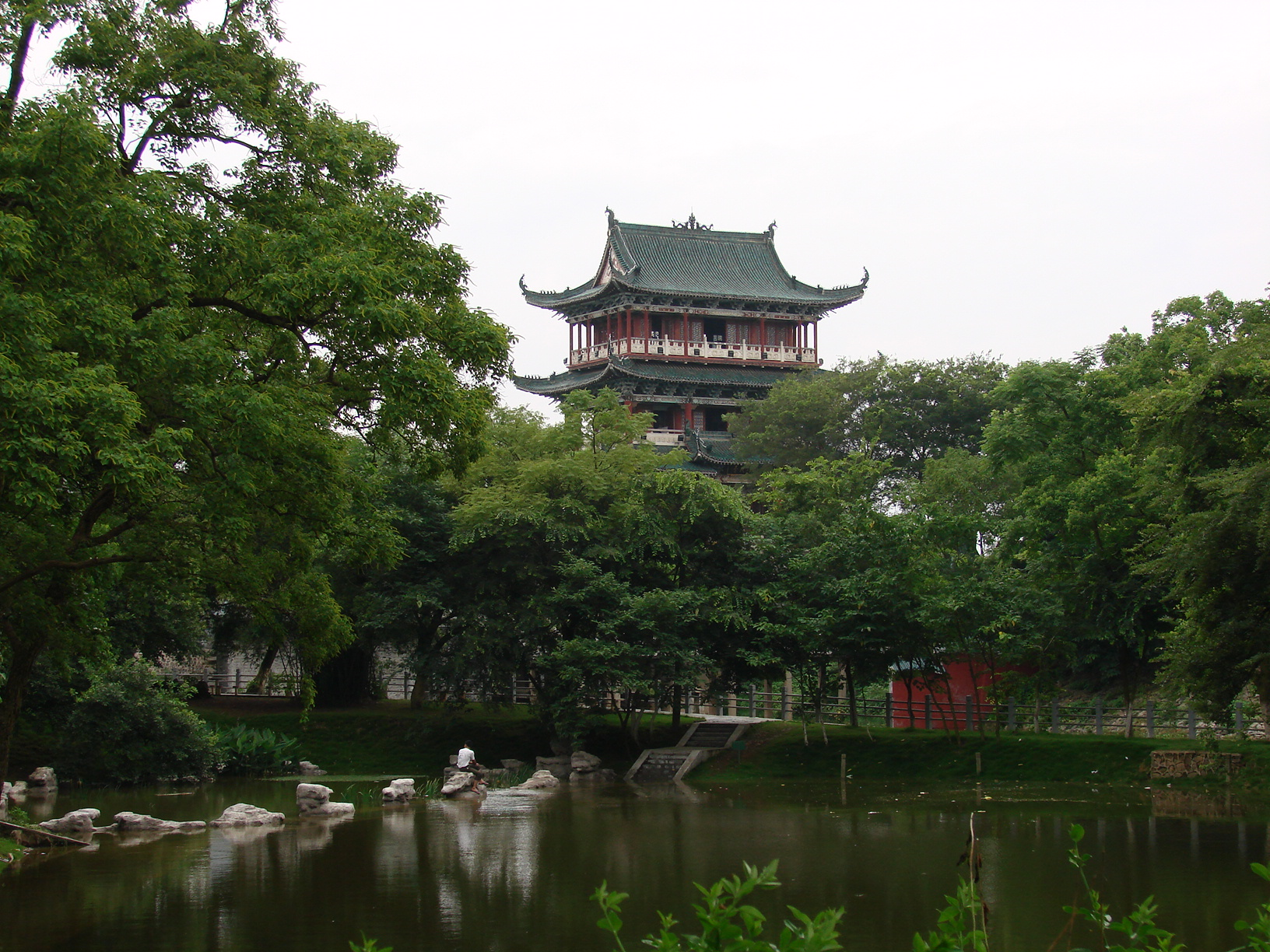
Bajing Pavilion in Ganzhou

Ganzhou is known as the "Orange Capital of the World" as well as the "Tungsten Capital of the World". The world's largest mechanical clock is located in Ganzhou called the Harmony Clock Tower, which was manufactured by UK-based clockmakers Smith of Derby Group. Though encircled by mountain scenery, other notable attractions in Jiangxi are Jingdezhen, Nanchang and Lushan among others. Some of the places of interest in Ganzhou include:

- Mount Jiulian (九连山), Longnan County
- Mei Pass, Dayu County
- Cuiwei Peak (翠微峰), Ningdu County
- Hakka architecture: Some of the most representative Hakka houses include Guanxi Xinwei (关西新围) of Longnan; Yanji Wei (燕翼围), of Yangcun (杨村); Longguang Wei (龙光围) of Taojiang (桃江); and Dongsheng Wei (东生围) of Anyuan, etc.
- Yugu Pavilion, Zhanggong District
- Bajing Pavilion, Zhanggong District
- Dongjin Bridge: Pontoon bridges have been constructed over the Zhang and Gong rivers since the Song dynasty. The Dongjin Bridge is one that can still be seen. It is 400 metres long, made up of wooden planks placed on around 100 wooden boats linked together with iron chains.
- Zao'er Alley (灶儿巷), Zhanggong District: An alley dating to at least the Song dynasty, with a length of 227.3 m (746 ft).

Zhanggong has a city wall dating to the Song dynasty, as well as a number of pavilions and Buddhist and Taoist temples from the Ming and Qing. Altogether there are some 17 National Cultural Relic Protection Units in Ganzhou and 48 Provincial-level Cultural Relic Protection Units.

== Media ==
Ganzhou Daily covers news about Ganzhou.

== Transportation ==
=== Roads and highways ===
- China National Highways: G 105, G 206, G 319, G 323.
- Expressways of China: G45 Daqing–Guangzhou Expressway and G76 Xiamen–Chengdu Expressway.

=== Railway ===
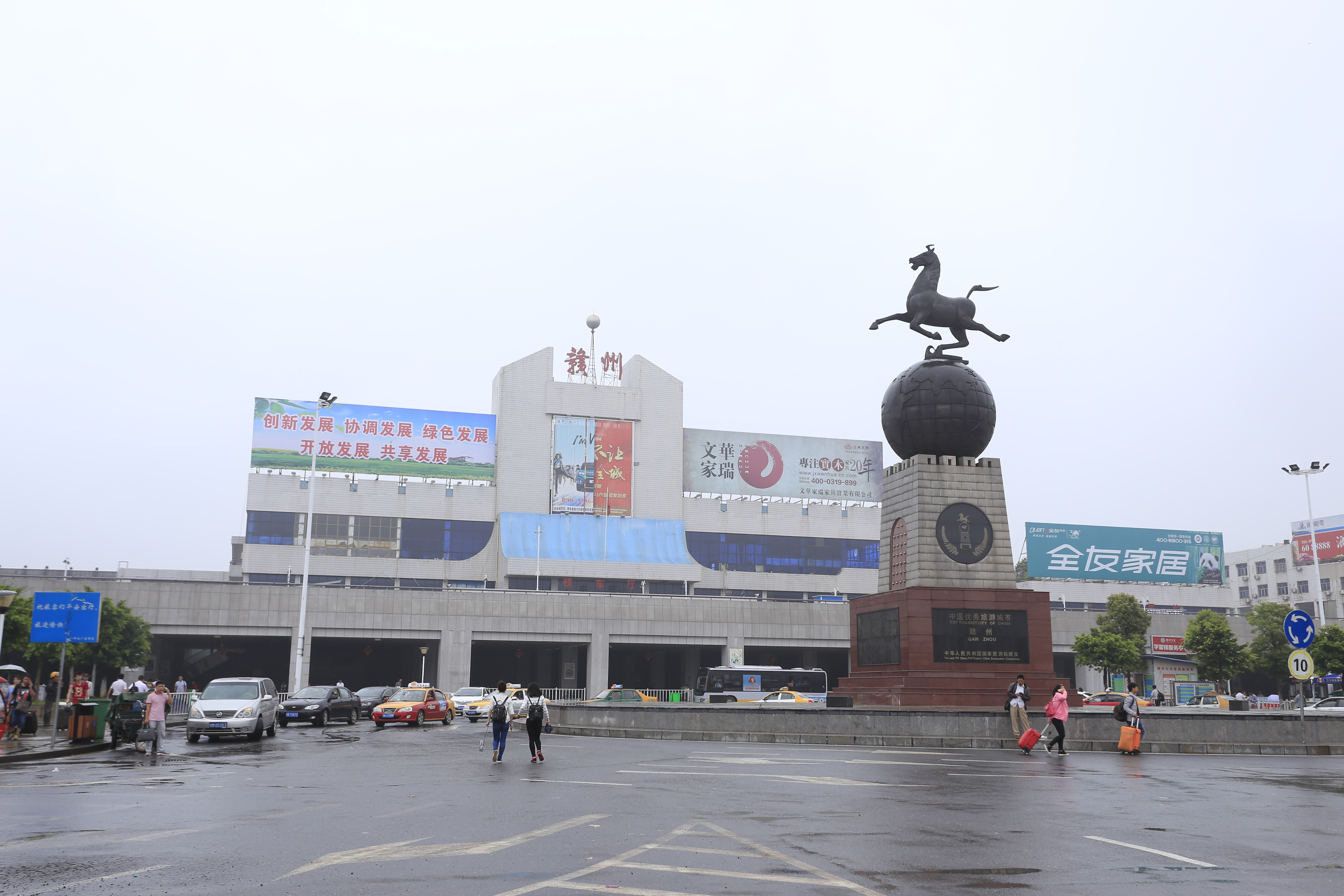
Ganzhou Railway Station.

The Beijing-Jiulong Railway goes through Ganzhou from north to south, and it meets the Ganzhou–Longyan Railway (Ganlong line) at East Ganzhou Railway Station in Zhanggong District. Nanchang–Shenzhen high-speed railway is under construction. The Ganzhou–Shenzhen high-speed railway opened on 10 December 2021 and connects Ganzhou with Shenzhen.

Major railway stations in Ganzhou are:

- Ganzhou, Xingguo, Nankang, Xinfeng, Longnan and Dingnan (Beijing-Jiulong Railway)
- Ganxian, Yudu, Huichang, Ruijin (Ganzhou-Longyan Railway)

=== Air ===
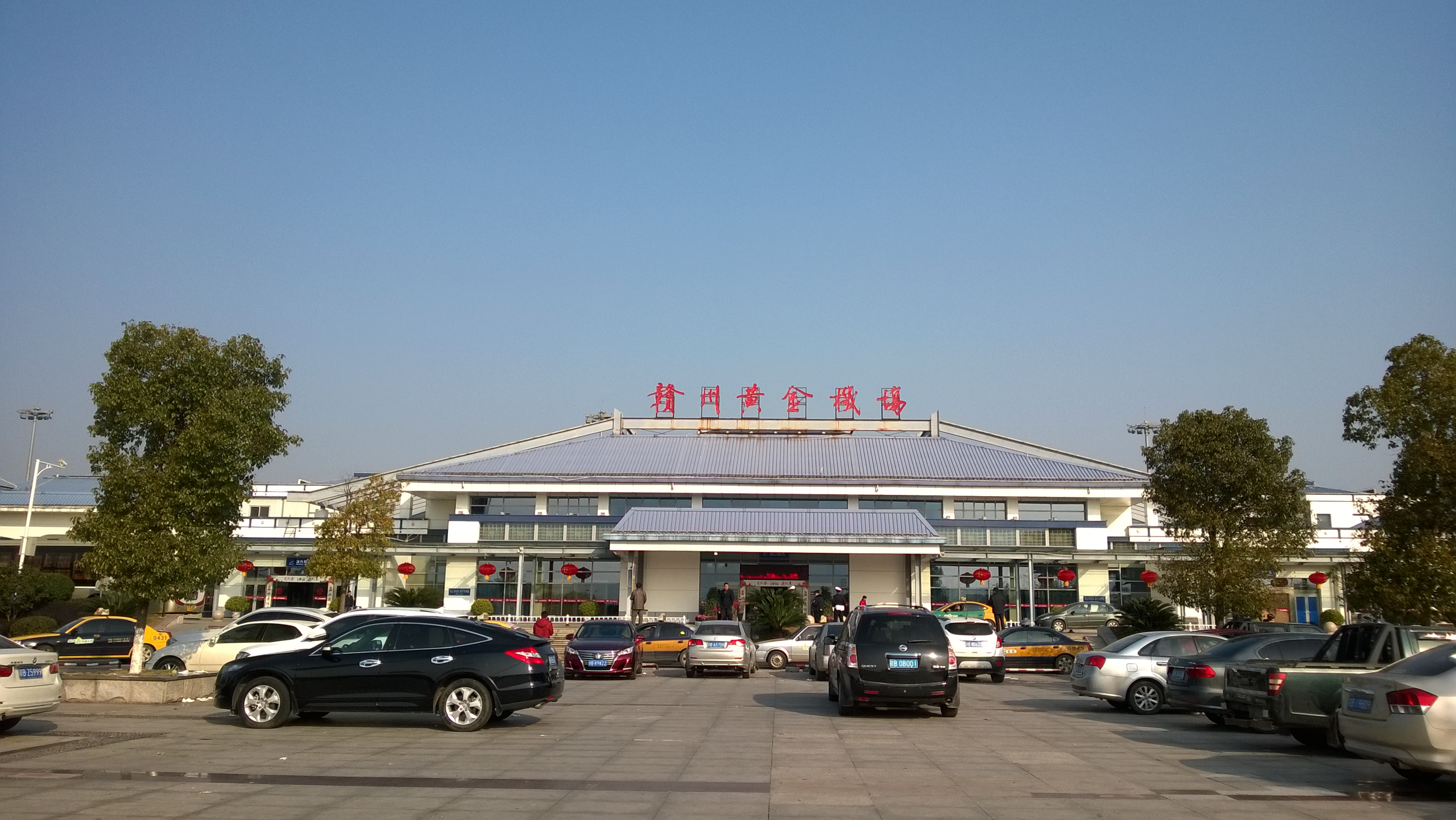
The terminal building of Ganzhou Huangjin Airport.

The new Ganzhou Huangjin Airport, located in Nankang, was opened on March 26, 2008. Its name inherited from the old Huangjin Airport in Huangjin Town, Zhanggong District, which was closed since it was too close to the expanding Ganzhou urban area. It has domestic routes to Shenzhen, Guangzhou, Nanchang, Xiamen, Nanjing, Shanghai, Nanning, Chongqing and Beijing.

== Notable people ==
- Nobel Laureate Gao Xingjian (Nobel Prize for literature in 2000) was born in Ganzhou.
- Artist Hu Zhiying was born November 12, 1959, in Ganzhou.
- Actress Zhu Xijuan was born in Ganzhou.
- Professor Li Peng was born in Ganzhou.

== Sister cities ==
- McAllen, Texas, United States, since 1994.
- Roissy-en-France, Val-d'Oise, France, since 2008.
- Freetown, Sierra Leone, since 2008.
- Brunswick, Georgia, United States, since 2008.
- Phocis, Greece, since 2011.
- Limeira, São Paulo, Brazil, since 2013.
