= Xinfengjiang Reservoir =

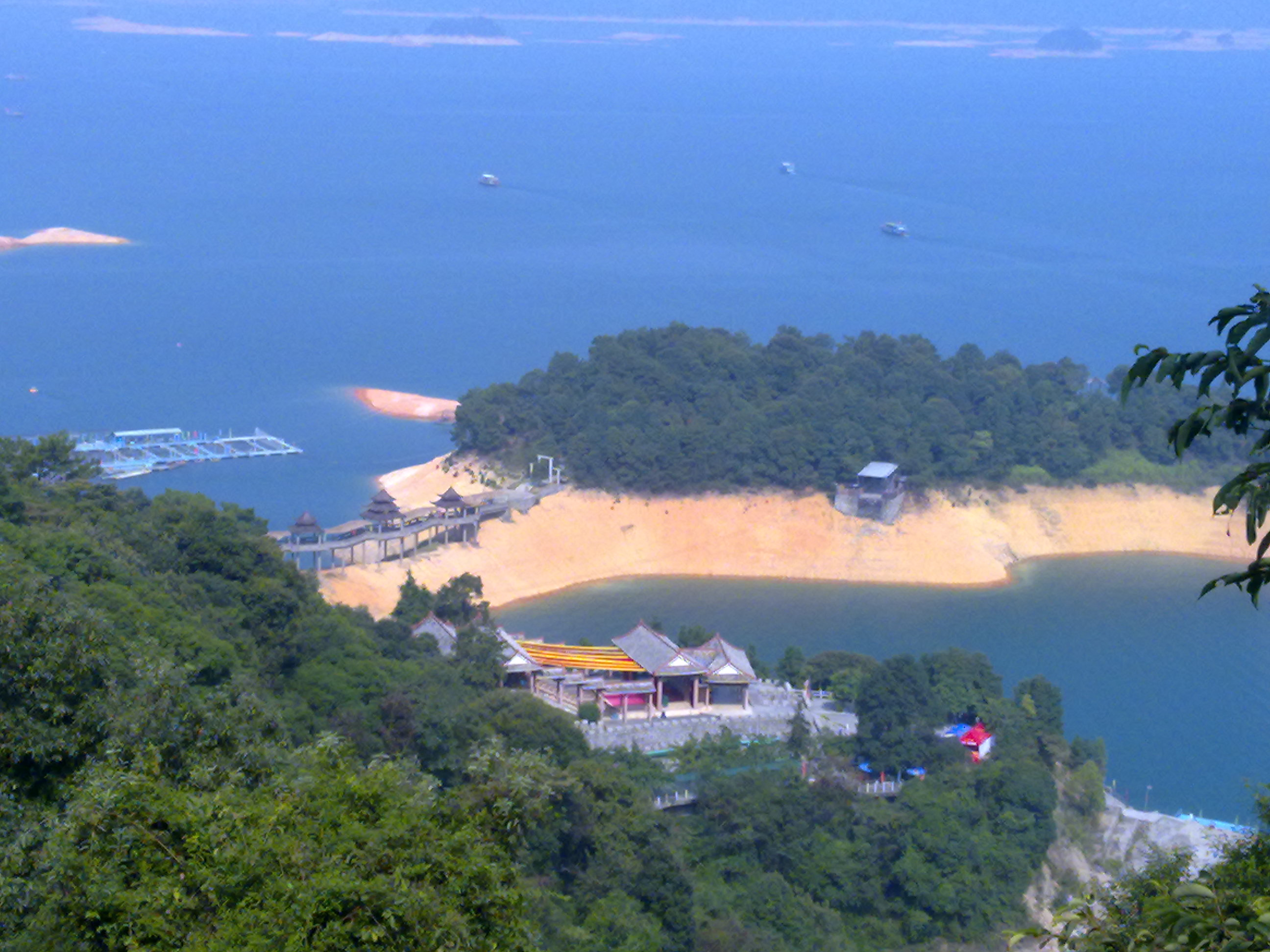
- A corner

- Location within Guangdong
- Location: Heyuan, Guangdong
- Coordinates: 23°43′35″N 114°38′51″E
- Type: reservoir
- Basin countries: China
- Surface area: 370 km^{2} (140 sq mi)
- Average depth: 28.7 m (94 ft)
- Max. depth: 93 m (305 ft)
- Water volume: 13.98 km^{3} (11,330,000 acre⋅ft)
- Surface elevation: 116 m (381 ft)
- Islands: more than 360

Xinfengjiang Reservoir
- Simplified Chinese: 新丰江水库
- Traditional Chinese: 新豐江水庫
Transcriptions
Standard Mandarin
- Hanyu Pinyin: Xīnfēngjiāng Shuǐkù
Yue: Cantonese
- Jyutping: san1 fung1 gong1 seoi2 fu3

Alternative Chinese name
- Simplified Chinese: 万绿湖
- Traditional Chinese: 萬綠湖
Transcriptions
Standard Mandarin
- Hanyu Pinyin: Wànlǜ Hú
Yue: Cantonese
- Jyutping: maan6 luk6 wu4

Xinfengjiang Reservoir (simplified Chinese: 新丰江水库; traditional Chinese: 新豐江水庫; Jyutping: san1 fung1 gong1 seoi2 fu3) or Wanlü Lake (万绿湖; 萬綠湖; maan6 luk6 wu4) is a man-made lake located in Heyuan, Guangdong, China, formed since the damming of the Xinfeng River (a tributary of Dong River) by the Xinfengjiang Dam. The dam is about 6 km away from the downtown of Heyuan and 170 km away from Guangzhou. It is the largest lake in Guangdong covering an area of 370 km^{2} and it has a storage capacity of 13.98 km^{3}.

Xinfengjiang Reservoir is known for its clear and almost drinkable water, such as that used to produce the renowned Nongfu Spring brand of mineral water (Generally, it is provided South China). Otherwise, the lake, which is famous for the name of "Wanlü Lake" (evergreen in Chinese), is an important tourist attraction of Guangdong.

== History ==
Guangdong is located in an area of Humid subtropical climate and is full of water resources. Before 1958, the Xinfengjiang River was an important transport line in Heyuan and Xinfeng.

Xinfengjiang Reservoir was founded in July 1958 for preventing flood, regulating the river height and the shipping, irrigating farms etc., and completed in 1969. At the time when it was built by the order of the local government, 6 towns and many villages were flooded. Thousands of local residents had to settle in other regions, such as the higher land in Heyuan (it was a county at that time), Xinfeng, Longmen, Boluo, and so on. It was estimated that about 94,311 out-migrated and 15,524 were forced to move to the undisturbed mountains. The wealthiest area in former Heyuan County might be covered by water forever.

In 1984, the Guangdong government allowed the lake to be a tourist attraction. It became a national park in 1993, the name "Wanlü Lake" was put forward to then.

== Water Supply ==
Xinfengjiang Reservoir has been used to supply clear drinkable water to Heyuan since the time it was built. However, to prevent water pollution, the local industry was limited. In 2006, 6 members of parliament put forward a motion that Heyuan people are below the poverty line and wish to provide the wealthier Pearl River Delta with clear water. They held the belief that through selling water, the local residents' income may be improved. Then, there was a heated discussion among the public. Some specialists proof the project's possibility. In February 2010, Xiaohua Liu, the mayor of Heyuan revealed that the project was passed, and the agreement between Heyuan and the seeking water cities was signed. "Through the piping system, Heyuan is able to supply 0.2 km^{2} clear water to Shenzhen and 0.1 km^{2} to Guangzhou every year", Liu said.

== See also ==
- Xinfengjiang Dam
- Heyuan
- Dongyuan County
- Nongfu Spring, Chinese mineral water company based in the area.
