= Xinfeng railway station (Jiangxi) =

Railway station in Xinfeng, Ganzhou, Jiangxi

Xinfeng 信丰
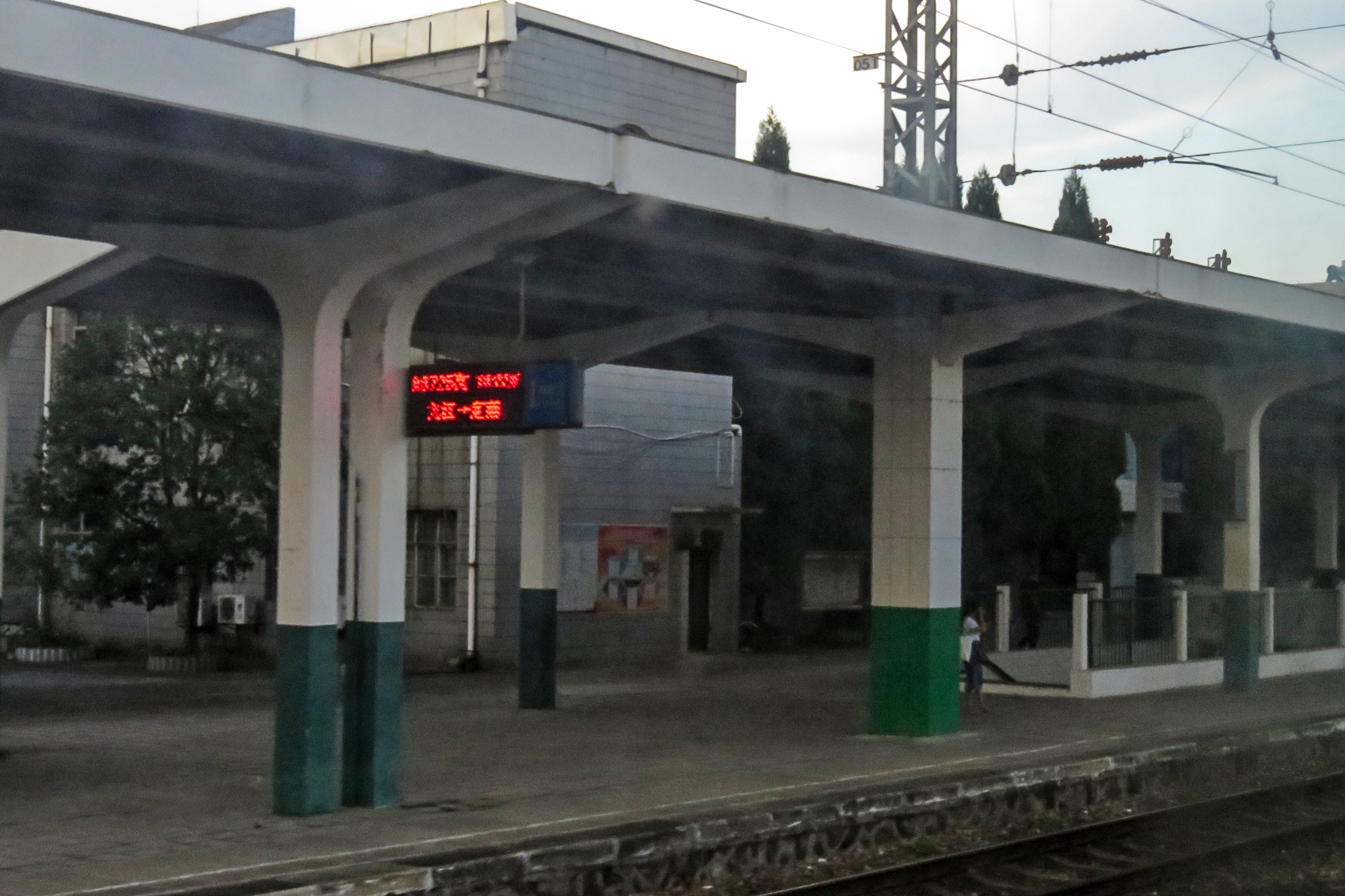

General information
- Location: Xinfeng County, Ganzhou, Jiangxi; China
- Coordinates: 25°24′03″N 114°54′08″E
- Line(s): Beijing–Kowloon railway

History
- Opened: 1996

Xinfeng railway station (Chinese: 信丰站) is a third-class railway station in Xinfeng County, Ganzhou, Jiangxi, China. It is an intermediate stop on the Beijing–Kowloon railway.

== History ==
The station opened in 1996. The station is located 1,924 kilometres (1,196 mi) from Beijing.

== Services ==
The station currently has around 13 trains daily, the number varies according to the day and the season. In January 2022 direct trains were available to Shenzhen East, Jiujiang, Xuzhou, Tianjin, Datong, Guangzhou East, Mudanjiang, Hefei, Lanzhou and Dingnan. (Note: Train times and routes change frequently, the above destinations were available on the Chinese Railways official website on the date checked, a less up-to-date overview of destinations can be found at the China Rail Map website.). As of 2018, the station serves around 4000 passengers daily.

== See also ==
- Xinfeng West railway station

== Notes ==
Preceding station	China Railway	Following station
Ganzhou towards Beijing West	Beijing–Kowloon railway	Longnan towards Hung Hom
