= Guanxizhen railway station =

Railway station in Jiangxi, China

Guanxizhen railway station 关西镇站
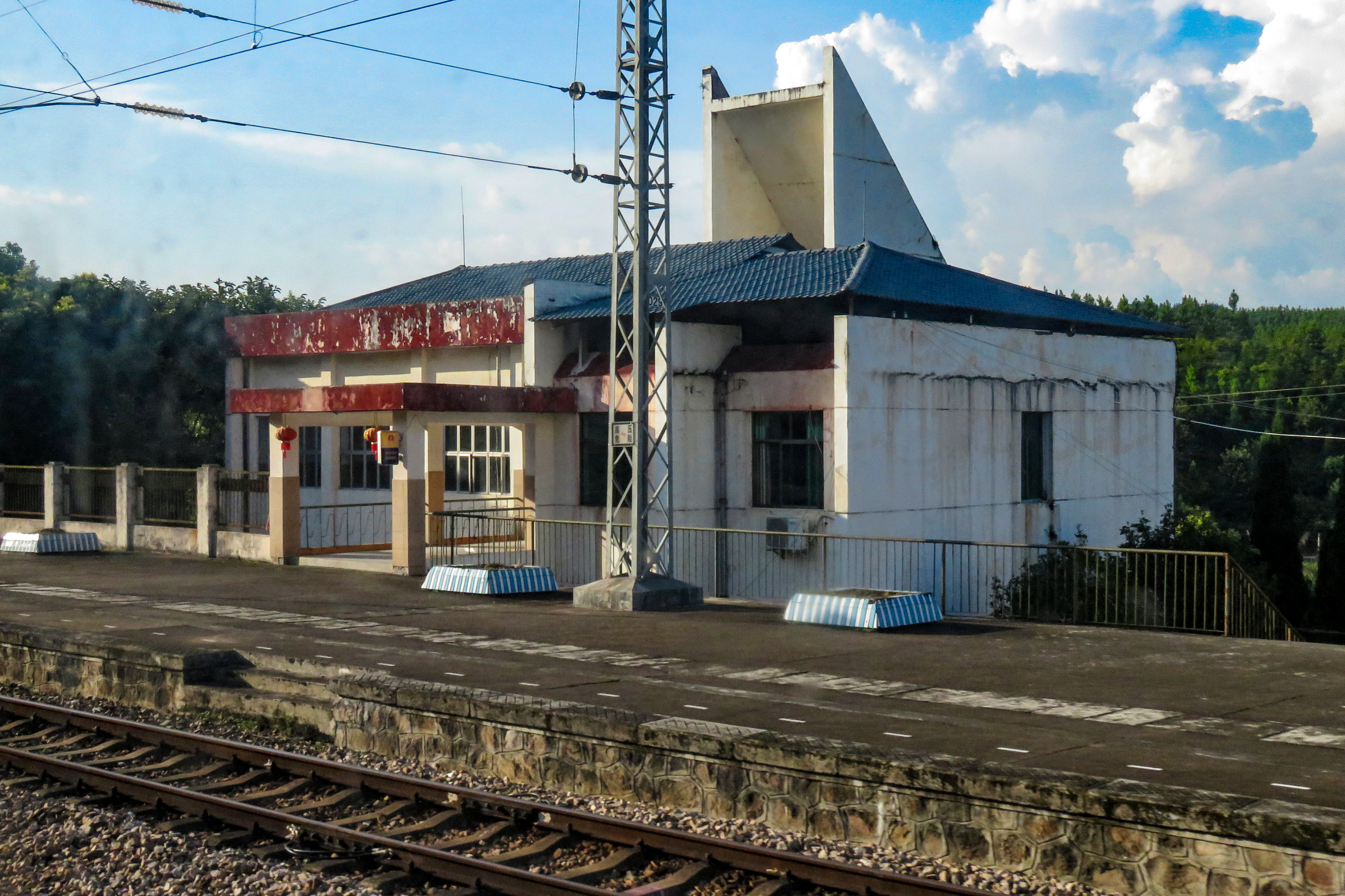
- The station building in 2019

General information
- Location: Guanxi Town, Longnan, Ganzhou, Jiangxi; China
- Coordinates: 24°50′25″N 114°55′38″E
- Operated by: CR Nanchang
- Line: Beijing–Kowloon railway

Other information
- Station code: GRG (Telegraph); GXZ (Pinyin); 25715 (Station)

History
- Opened: 1996
Location

Guanxizhen railway station (Chinese: 关西镇站), also known as Guanxi Town station, is a railway station in Guanxi Town, Longnan, Ganzhou, Jiangxi, China, operated by CR Nanchang. It opened its services in 1996.

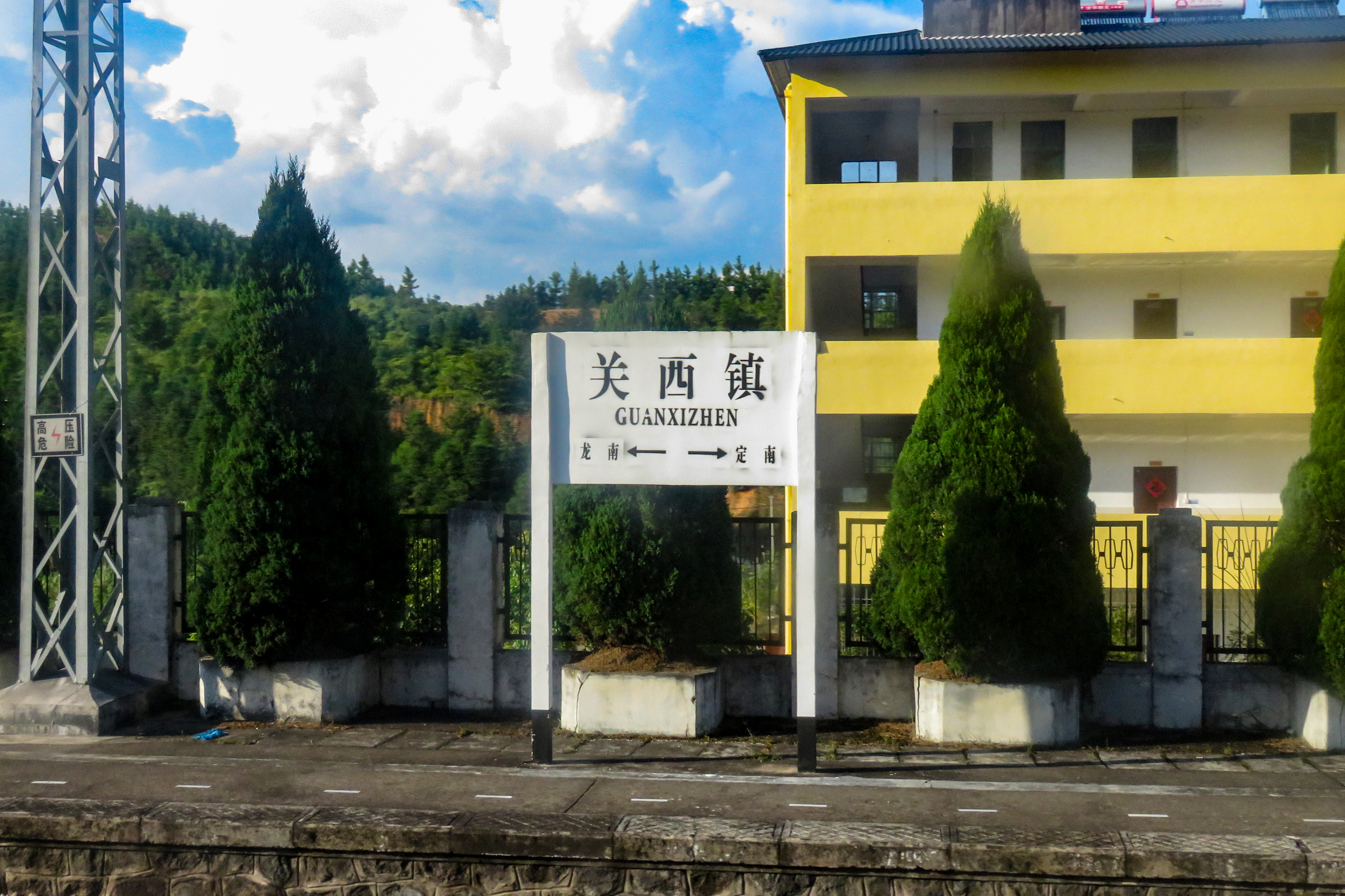
The station sign of Guanxizhen railway station

It is between Longnan railway station and Dingnan railway station on the Beijing–Kowloon railway. The station is a fifth-class station and currently handles freight.
