= Xinfengjiang Dam =

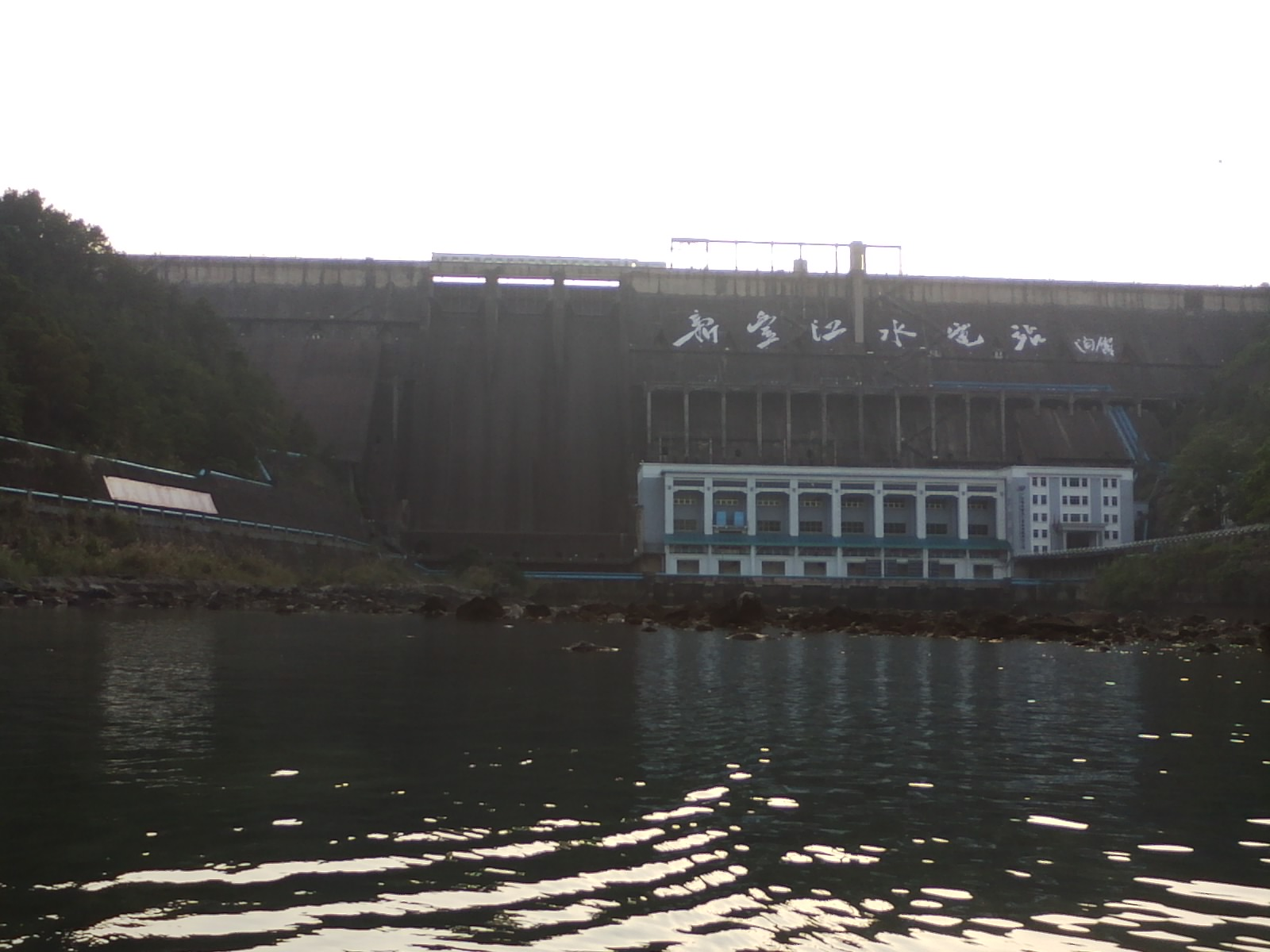

- Location within China
- Country: China
- Location: Heyuan City
- Coordinates: 23°43′38″N 114°38′57″E
- Construction began: 1958
- Opening date: 1962

Dam and spillways
- Impounds: Xinfeng River
- Height: 105 m (344 ft)
- Length: 440 m (1,444 ft)
- Width (crest): 5 m (16 ft)
- Dam volume: 1,060,000 m^{3} (37,433,547 ft^{3})
- Spillways: 2
- Spillway type: Service, surface gate-controlled overflow Auxiliary tunnel
- Spillway capacity: Service: 11,400 m^{3}/s (402,587 cu ft/s); Tunnel: 1,700 m^{3}/s (60,035 cu ft/s)

Reservoir
- Creates: Xinfengjiang Reservoir
- Total capacity: 13,900,000,000 m^{3} (11,268,913 acre⋅ft)
- Active capacity: 5,740 km^{2} (2,216 sq mi)
- Surface area: 370 km^{2} (143 sq mi)

Power Station
- Commission date: 1960-1977
- Hydraulic head: 81 m (266 ft) (max.)
- Turbines: 3 x 72.5 MW 1 x 75 MW Francis-type
- Installed capacity: 292.5 MW; 315 MW (max. planned)

The Xinfengjiang Dam (Chinese: 新丰江水电站; Jyutping: san1 fung1 gong1 seoi2 din6 zaam6, also known as the Xinfeng Dam) is a gravity dam on the Xinfeng River, 8 km (5 mi) upstream of its confluence with the Dong River, and just west of Heyuan City in Guangdong Province, China. The dam's power station has a 292.5 MW installed capacity and its reservoir supplies water for farming along with drinking water to Guangzhou, Shenzhen and Hong Kong. Construction on the dam began in 1958, the first generator was operational in 1960 and the dam complete in 1962. The dam's reservoir-filling is attributed to several earthquakes within the project area including a 6.1-magnitude (M_{w}) on March 19, 1962.

== Background ==
Construction on the dam began in 1958, a total of 1,550,000 m^{3} (54,737,733 ft^{3}) of earth was excavated at the construction site. On October 20, 1959 the reservoir behind the dam began to fill and in November there were several small earthquakes within the reservoir zone. When the water level reached 81 m (266 ft) above sea level (ASL) in May 1960, there were three to four earthquakes at a 3.1-M_{w} and on July 18, when the water level 90 m (295 ft) ASL, a 4.3-M_{w} earthquake occurred. On March 19, 1962 when the reservoir reached 110.5 m (363 ft) ASL there was a 6.1-M_{w} earthquake with an epicenter 1.1 km (1 mi) downstream from the dam which destroyed several houses in the area. After the earthquake and as a precaution, cavities within the foundation were reinforced with concrete. This and other upgrades brought the dam to a 9.5-M_{w}-rated resistant design.

== Design ==
The dam is a 105 m (344 ft) tall, 440 m (1,444 ft) wide gravity dam. Its crest width is 5 m (16 ft) and it has a structural volume of 1,060,000 m^{3} (37,433,547 ft^{3}) of concrete. Above the dam is a 5,740 km^{2} (2,216 sq mi) drainage area and it withholds a reservoir of 13,900,000,000 m^{3} (11,268,913 acre⋅ft). The dam contains a surface controlled spillway with three floodgates, each with a 3,800 m^{3}/s (134,196 cu ft/s) maximum discharge capacity for a total of 11,400 m^{3}/s (402,587 cu ft/s). The discharge tunnel on the dam's left bank has a 10 m (33 ft) diameter, is 778 m (2,552 ft) long and has a 1,700 m^{3}/s (60,035 cu ft/s) capacity. The dam's reservoir has a 3,300,000,000 m^{3} (2,675,354 acre⋅ft) flood storage capacity, rated for a once in a hundred-year flood. The dam's power station is located at its base (toe) and contains four Francis turbine generators. Three are rated at 72.5 MW and the fourth at 75 MW for a total design capacity of 292.5 MW but the power plant can operate at a maximum 315 MW after later upgrades.

== See also ==
- List of power stations in China
