= Boluo County =

Boluo 博罗县 Poklo; Polo
- County
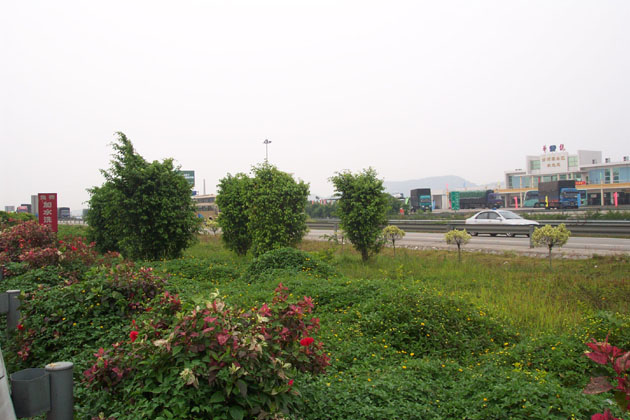
- Guangzhou–Huizhou Expressway in the county

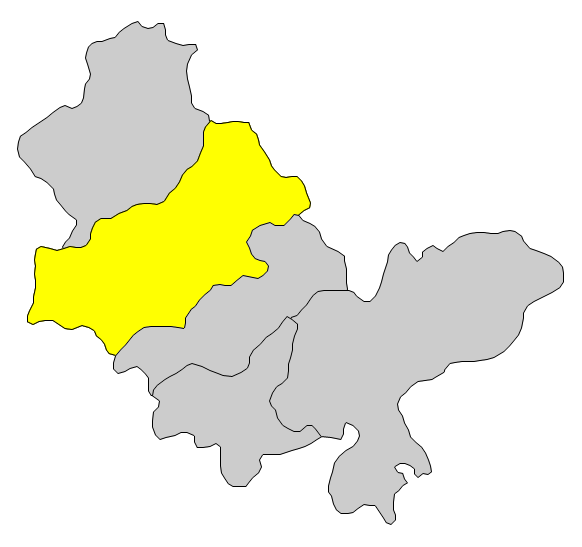
- Boluo in Huizhou

- Huizhou in Guangdong
- Coordinates: 23°10′22″N 114°17′22″E
- Country: People's Republic of China
- Province: Guangdong
- Prefecture-level city: Huizhou
- County seat: Luoyang

Area
  - Total: 2,795 km^{2} (1,079 sq mi)

Population (2020 census)
  - Total: 1,210,878
  - Density: 433.2/km^{2} (1,122/sq mi)
- Time zone: UTC+8 (China Standard)
- Postal code: 5161XX
- Area code: 0752

Boluo County
- Simplified Chinese: 博罗县
- Traditional Chinese: 博羅縣
- Jyutping: bok^{3} lo^{4} jyun^{2}
- Hanyu Pinyin: Bóluó Xiàn
- Postal: Poklo
Transcriptions
Standard Mandarin
- Hanyu Pinyin: Bóluó Xiàn
Yue: Cantonese
- Jyutping: bok^{3} lo^{4} jyun^{2}

Boluo County (simplified Chinese: 博罗县; traditional Chinese: 博羅縣) is a county of east-central Guangdong province, People's Republic of China. It is under the administration of the prefecture-level city of Huizhou, and in 2020, had a population of 1,210,878 residing in an area of 2,795 km^{2} (1,079 sq mi). It borders Yuancheng District, Dongyuan and Zijin counties to the northeast, Huiyang and Huicheng Districts to the southeast, Dongguan to the south, Zengcheng District to the west, and Longmen County to the northwest.

== History ==
In Lüshi Chunqiu, the current Boluo used to be one of the many Yue states without a king before Qin dynasty. The state's name was transliterated as 縛婁 (Simplified: 缚娄, Fuluo) in Chinese. and it was located nearby Mount Luofu (羅浮山/罗浮山). 縛 (缚) or 浮 are the hanzi transliteration of the old Yue language's "people", while 羅 (罗) or 婁 means "cave". The current Boluo (博罗) is derived from the same old Yue word and therefore means "people in mountain".

In 214 BCE after the unification of China by Qin, Fuluo County (傅羅縣) was established. Its name was altered to Boluo under the Emperor Wu of Jin's rule in 280 CE.

== Administrative divisions ==
Boluo administers 17 towns:

Name	Chinese (S)	Hanyu Pinyin	Population (2010)	Area (km^{2})
Luoyang town	罗阳镇	Luōyáng Zhèn	208,739	251.62
Gongzhuang town	公庄镇	Gōngzhuāng Zhèn	46,813	299.5
Baitang town	柏塘镇	Bǎitáng Zhèn	50,013	161.4
Yangcun town	杨村镇	Yángcūn Zhèn	41,958	120
Mabei town	麻陂镇	Mábēi Zhèn	21,690	58.6
Shiba town	石坝镇	Shíbà Zhèn	39,149	142
Taimei town	泰美镇	Tàiměi Zhèn	34,169	183.5
Longxi town	龙溪镇	Lóngxī Zhèn	88,964	115.84
Yuanzhou town	园洲镇	Yuánzhōu Zhèn	146,053	110
Shiwan town	石湾镇	Shíwān Zhèn	122,802	83
Longhua town	龙华镇	Lónghuá Zhèn	26,009	62
Futian town	福田镇	Fútián Zhèn	38,286	86.7
Changning town	长宁镇	Chángníng Zhèn	39,983	117
Huzhen town	湖镇镇	Húzhèn Zhèn	56,551	117.3
Yangqiao town	杨侨镇	Yángqiáo Zhèn	29,868	89
Guanyinge town	观音阁镇	Guānyīngé Zhèn	17,309	143
Henghe town	横河镇	Hénghé Zhèn	21,421	232.88

== Economy ==
Boluo County is said to be the home to the country's largest farm for raising the rare "Golden coin turtle" Cuora trifasciata.

== Transport ==
Guangzhou–Huizhou and Huizhou–Heyuan Expressway (惠河高速公路) intersect within the county, and China National Highways 205 and 324 as well as the Beijing–Kowloon and Guangzhou–Meizhou–Shantou railways traverse the entire county.

== Climate ==
Climate data for Huiyang (Boluo County), elevation 50 m (160 ft), (1991–2020 normals, extremes 1958–2010)
Month	Jan	Feb	Mar	Apr	May	Jun	Jul	Aug	Sep	Oct	Nov	Dec	Year
Record high °C (°F)	28.6 (83.5)	31.3 (88.3)	33.2 (91.8)	34.3 (93.7)	35.8 (96.4)	37.9 (100.2)	38.4 (101.1)	38.0 (100.4)	37.7 (99.9)	36.3 (97.3)	33.8 (92.8)	30.2 (86.4)	38.4 (101.1)
Mean daily maximum °C (°F)	19.6 (67.3)	20.8 (69.4)	23.3 (73.9)	27.0 (80.6)	30.3 (86.5)	32.1 (89.8)	33.5 (92.3)	33.3 (91.9)	32.3 (90.1)	29.7 (85.5)	25.9 (78.6)	21.3 (70.3)	27.4 (81.4)
Daily mean °C (°F)	14.3 (57.7)	16.0 (60.8)	18.8 (65.8)	22.7 (72.9)	26.0 (78.8)	27.9 (82.2)	28.9 (84.0)	28.6 (83.5)	27.6 (81.7)	24.7 (76.5)	20.4 (68.7)	15.7 (60.3)	22.6 (72.7)
Mean daily minimum °C (°F)	10.9 (51.6)	12.8 (55.0)	15.8 (60.4)	19.8 (67.6)	23.0 (73.4)	25.1 (77.2)	25.8 (78.4)	25.6 (78.1)	24.4 (75.9)	21.1 (70.0)	16.8 (62.2)	12.1 (53.8)	19.4 (67.0)
Record low °C (°F)	−2.4 (27.7)	0.9 (33.6)	2.1 (35.8)	9.3 (48.7)	15.5 (59.9)	18.4 (65.1)	20.2 (68.4)	22.3 (72.1)	16.9 (62.4)	10.0 (50.0)	4.9 (40.8)	−0.1 (31.8)	−2.4 (27.7)
Average precipitation mm (inches)	47.7 (1.88)	54.9 (2.16)	104.2 (4.10)	208.1 (8.19)	266.0 (10.47)	413.9 (16.30)	258.4 (10.17)	314.3 (12.37)	167.5 (6.59)	41.9 (1.65)	30.1 (1.19)	35.4 (1.39)	1,942.4 (76.46)
Average precipitation days (≥ 0.1 mm)	6.4	9.1	12.6	14.3	17.1	19.4	16.5	17.2	12.1	4.7	4.8	5.5	139.7
Average relative humidity (%)	73	76	79	81	81	83	80	81	77	71	71	70	77
Mean monthly sunshine hours	130.4	94.2	84.7	90.7	123.6	143.8	198.3	182.3	187.9	196.3	166.9	149.9	1,749
Percentage possible sunshine	39	30	23	24	30	34	46	44	50	57	51	47	40
Source: China Meteorological Administration all-time extremes
