= Heping railway station =

Heping railway station can refer to:

- Heping railway station (Guangdong), PRC
- Heping railway station (Taiwan)
