= Sankou =

Sānkǒu may refer to the following places in China:

- Sankou, Huangshan, town in Huangshan District, Anhui
- Sankou, Liuyang, town in Hunan
