= Longchuan West railway station =

Railway station in Longchuan, Heyuan, Guangdong

Longchuan West 龙川西
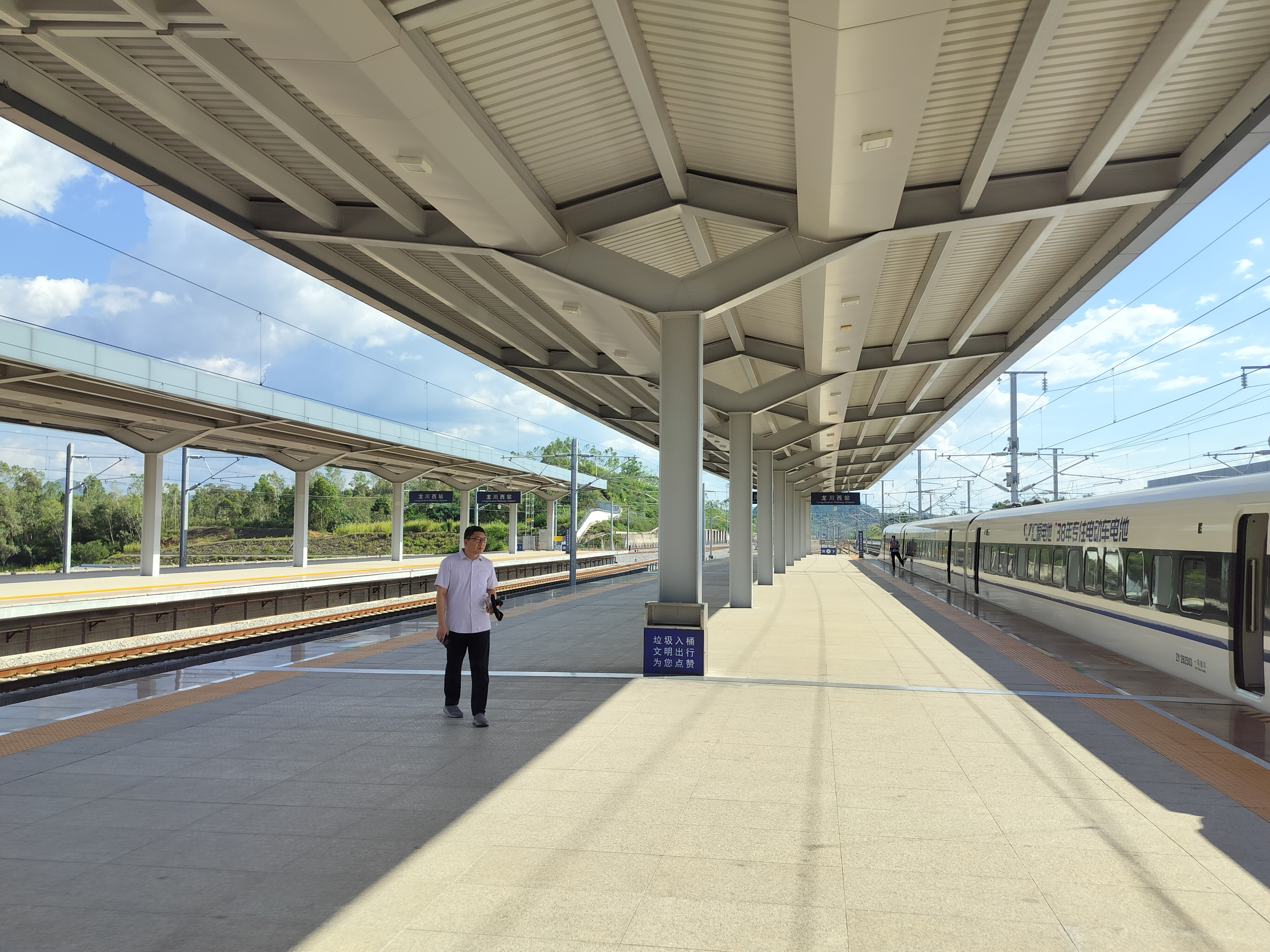

General information
- Location: Longchuan County, Heyuan, Guangdong; China
- Coordinates: 24.077396°N 115.1809°E
- Lines: Ganzhou–Shenzhen high-speed railway; Meizhou–Longchuan high-speed railway

History
- Opened: 10 December 2021
Location

Longchuan West railway station (Chinese: 龙川西站) is a railway station in Longchuan County, Heyuan, Guangdong, China. It opened with the Ganzhou–Shenzhen high-speed railway on 10 December 2021. The station is also on the Meizhou–Longchuan high-speed railway, which was opened on 14 September 2024.

== See also ==
- Longchuan railway station
