= Longchuan railway station =

Railway station in Heyuan, China

Coordinates: 24.1150°N 115.2325°E

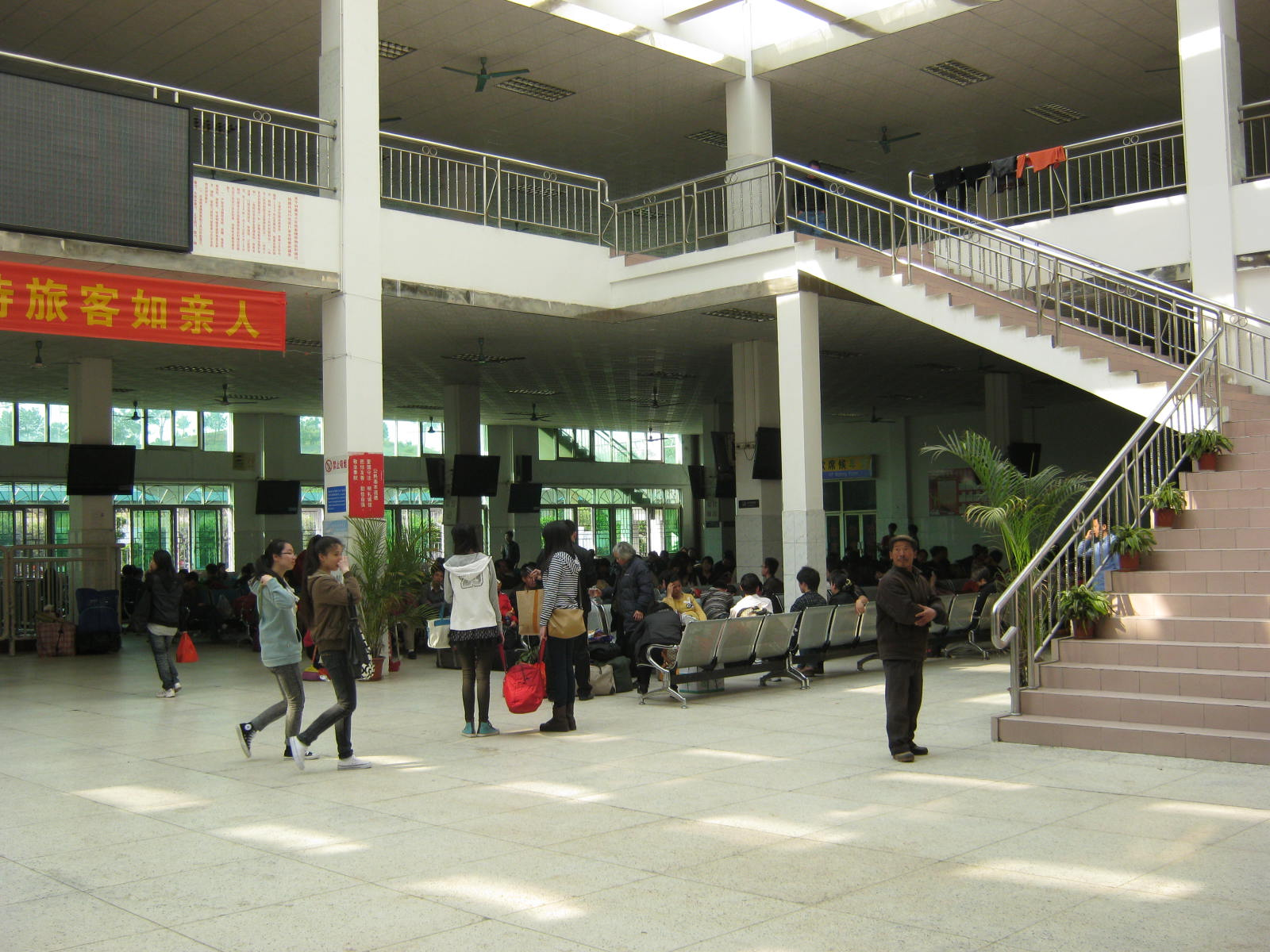
Longchuan railway station

Longchuan railway station is located in Longchuan County in the city of Heyuan in Guangdong province, China.

It is part of the Guangzhou–Meizhou–Shantou railway system.

== See also ==
- Longchuan West railway station

Preceding station	China Railway	Following station
Heping towards Beijing West	Beijing–Kowloon railway	Heyuan towards Hung Hom
Huacheng towards Zhangping	Zhangping–Longchuan railway	Terminus
