= Luoyang, Boluo County =

Luoyang 罗阳镇
- Town
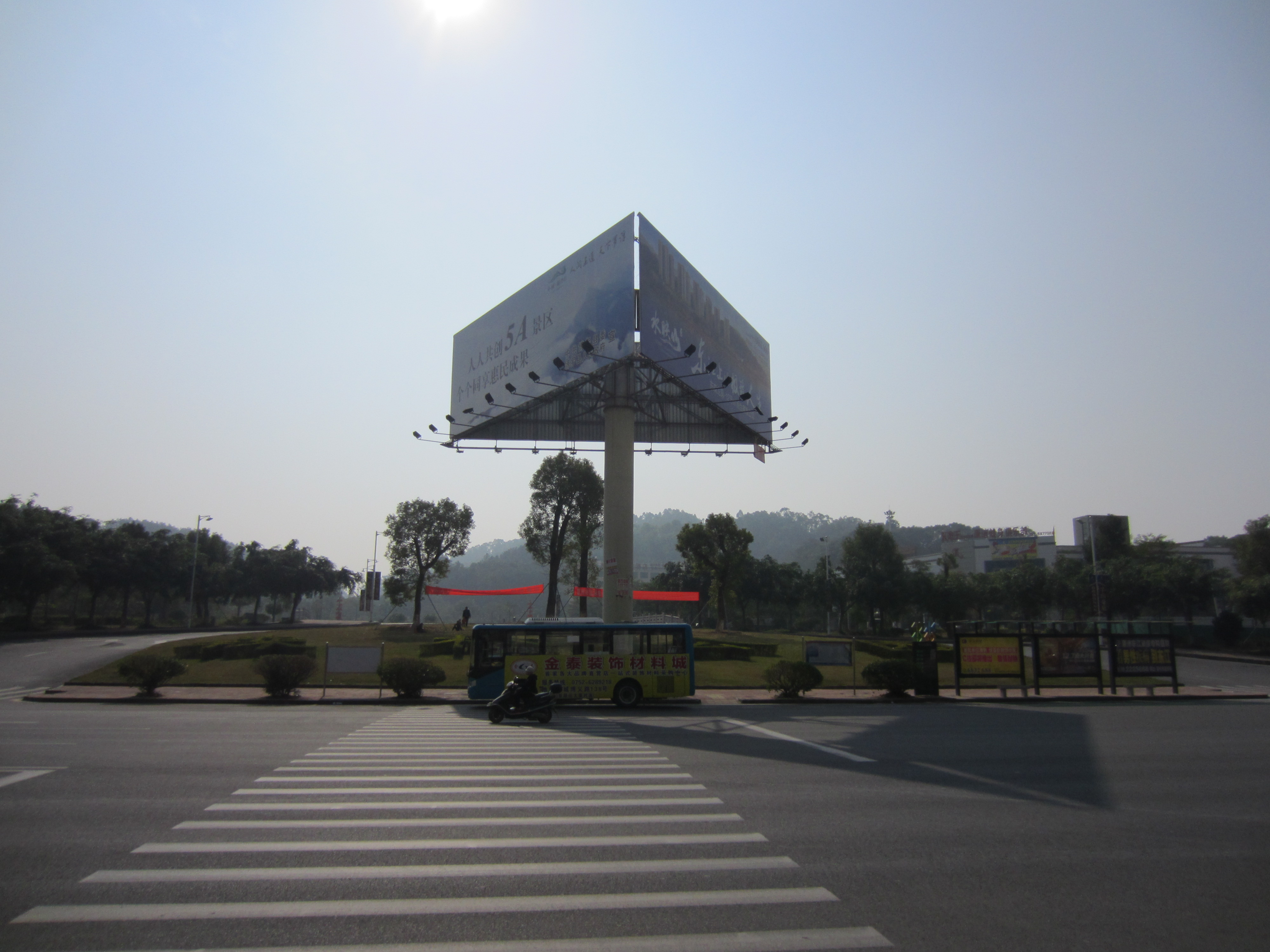
- Park in Luoyang

- Location in Guangdong
- Coordinates: 23°09′51″N 114°16′50″E
- Country: People's Republic of China
- Province: Guangdong
- Prefecture-level city: Huizhou
- Time zone: UTC+8 (China Standard)

Luoyang (Chinese: 罗阳镇; pinyin: Luōyáng Zhèn) is a town and the county seat of Boluo County, Huizhou Prefecture, Guangdong Province, China. It is located on the Dong River.

The China National Highway 324 connects Luoyang with the urban districts of Huizhou.

== Hallstatt replica ==
Luoyang has a housing development area that is a replica of the UNESCO-listed Austrian town Hallstatt.
