= Ganzhou–Shenzhen high-speed railway =

Railway line in China

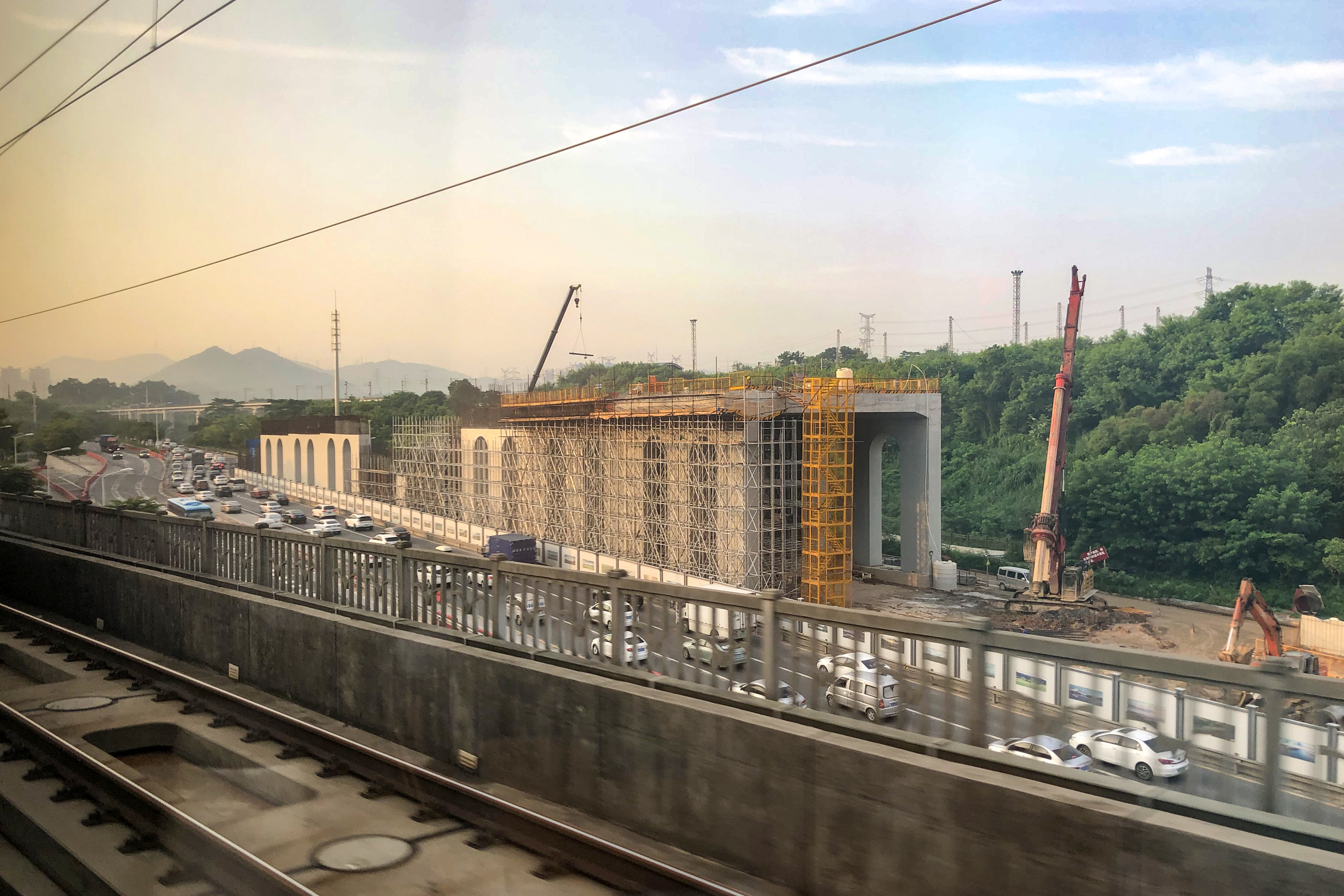
- Construction site in Longhua District, Shenzhen

Overview
- Status: Operational
- Locale: Jiangxi & Guangdong; China
- Termini: Ganzhou; Shenzhen North

Service
- Services: 1
- Operator(s): China Railway High-speed

History
- Opened: 10 December 2021

Technical
- Line length: 434 km (270 mi)
- Track gauge: 1,435 mm (4 ft 8 1/2 in)
- Electrification: 50 Hz 25,000 V
- Operating speed: 350 km/h

Ganzhou–Shenzhen high-speed railway, or Ganzhou–Shenzhen section of Beijing–Hong Kong corridor, is a high-speed railway from Shenzhen and the Pearl River Delta through northeast Guangdong province to Ganzhou in Jiangxi province, China. It will form part of Beijing–Hong Kong corridor. The railway opened on 10 December 2021.

== History ==
Guangdong officials listed the Ganzhou–Shenzhen HSR as a major part of the province's 2011 agenda, and Shenzhen Mayor Xu Qin called for accelerated construction of the line at the provincial legislature's annual session in 2012. Peng Jianwen, mayor of the city of Heyuan in northwestern Guangdong, confirmed in January 2014 that construction of the Ganzhou-Shenzhen HSR will start in 2015 and be completed in 2020.

Construction on the 10.24-kilometre (6.36 mi) long Longnan tunnel, the longest on the railway, began in April 2017.

Tracklaying began on 1 February 2021.

== Stations ==
Station Name	Chinese	Distance km	Metro transfers/connections	China Railway transfers/connections
Ganzhou West	赣州西			Nanchang–Ganzhou high-speed railway
Xinfeng West	信丰西			
Longnan East	龙南东			
Dingnan South	定南南			
Heping North	和平北			
Longchuan West	龙川西			Meizhou–Longchuan high-speed railway
Heyuan North	河源北			
Heyuan East	河源东			
Boluo North	博罗北			
Huizhou North	惠州北			
Zhongkai	仲恺			
Dongguan South	东莞南			
Guangmingcheng	光明城		6B	Guangzhou–Shenzhen–Hong Kong Express Rail Link
Shenzhen North	深圳北		4 5 6	Guangzhou–Shenzhen–Hong Kong Express Rail Link
