= Heping railway station (Guangdong) =

Railway station in Heyuan, Guangdong, China

Coordinates: 24.45737°N 114.96937°E

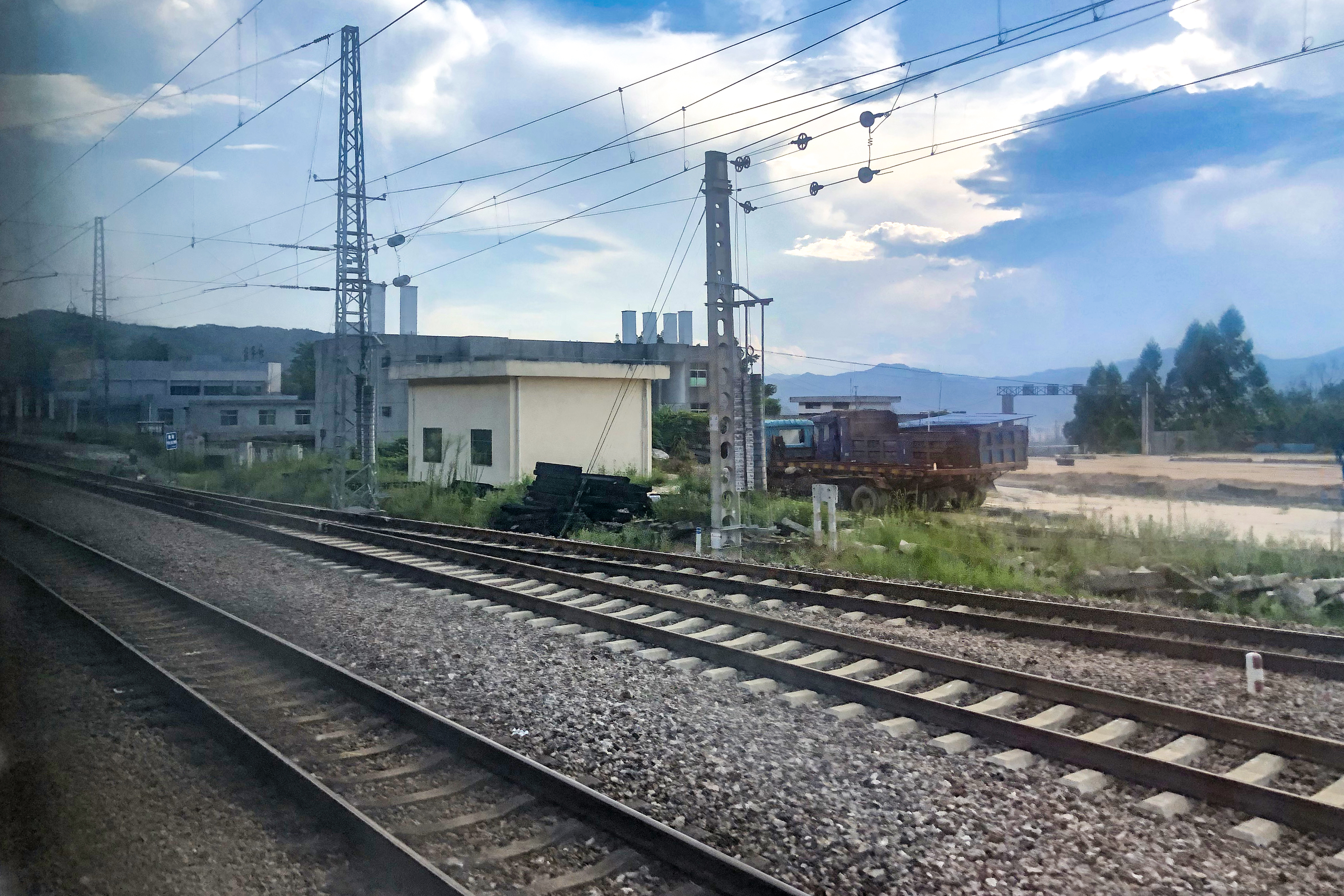
Heping Railway

Heping railway station (Chinese: 和平站) serves Heping County in the city of Heyuan in Guangdong Province, southern China.

Preceding station	China Railway	Following station
Dingnan towards Beijing West	Beijing–Kowloon railway	Longchuan towards Hung Hom
