= Longyan–Longchuan high-speed railway =

High-speed rail line in China

Overview
- Native name: 龙龙高速铁路
- Status: Partly in operation
- Termini: Gutianhuizhi; Longchuan West
- Stations: 7

Service
- Operator(s): China Railway Nanchang Group & China Railway Guangzhou Group

History
- Opened: 26 December 2023 (Gutianhuizhi to Wuping); 14 September 2024 (Meizhou West to Longchuan West)

Technical
- Line length: 290 km (180 mi)
- Track gauge: 1,435 mm (4 ft 8 1/2 in)
- Operating speed: 250 km/h (155 mph) (Gutianhuizhi to Meizhou West); 350 km/h (217 mph) (Meizhou West to Longchuan West)

The Longyan–Longchuan high-speed railway is a high-speed railway in China. The railway will be 290 kilometres (180 mi) long when completed, and will have a design speed of 250 kilometres per hour (160 mph). The section from Meizhou West to Longchuan West will be operated at 350 kilometres per hour (220 mph).

== History ==
Construction officially began on 30 June 2020.

The section from Gutianhuizhi to Wuping opened on 26 December 2023, and section from Meizhou West to Longchuan West opened on 14 September 2024.

== Stations ==
Station Name	Chinese	China Railway transfers/connections
Gutianhuizhi	古田会址	Ganzhou–Ruijin–Longyan railway
Shanghang	上杭	
Wuping	武平	
Jiaoling	蕉岭	
Yanyang West	雁洋西	
Meizhou	梅州	Zhangping–Longchuan railway
Meizhou West	梅州西	Meizhou–Chaoshan high-speed railway
Xingning South	兴宁南	
Wuhua	五华	
Longchuan West	龙川西	Ganzhou–Shenzhen high-speed railway
