= Guanyinge, Guangdong =

Guanyinge 观音阁镇
- Town
- Location in Guangdong
- Coordinates: 23°24′15″N 114°35′39″E
- Country: People's Republic of China
- Province: Guangdong
- Prefecture-level city: Huizhou
- County: Boluo
- Village-level divisions: 1 residential community 14 villages
- Elevation: 41 m (135 ft)
- Time zone: UTC+8 (China Standard)
- Area code: 0752

Guanyinge (simplified Chinese: 观音阁; traditional Chinese: 觀音閣; pinyin: Guānyīngé; Jyutping: gun^{1}jam^{1}gok^{3}; lit. 'Guanyin Temple') is a town in the Dong River Valley in Boluo County in eastern Guangdong province, China. As of 2011, it has one residential community (社区) and 14 villages under its administration.

== See also ==
- List of township-level divisions of Guangdong
