= Ganzhou West railway station =

Railway station in Ganzhou, China

Coordinates: 25.8232°N 114.8108°E

Ganzhouxi 赣州西
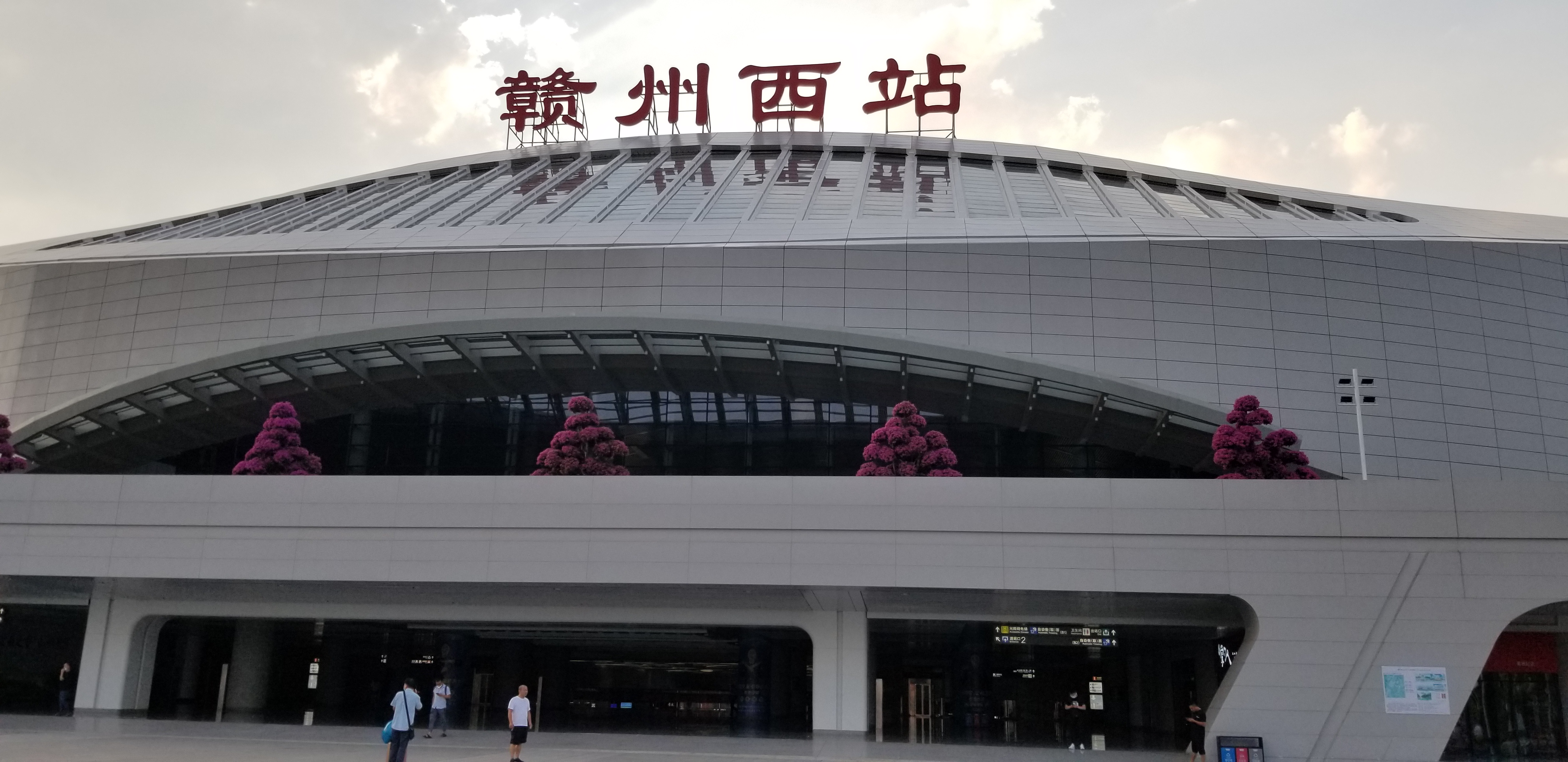

General information
- Location: Nankang District, Ganzhou, Jiangxi; China
- Operated by: China Railway Corporation
- Lines: Beijing–Hong Kong high speed railway; Changsha–Ganzhou high-speed railway (U/C)
- Platforms: 6

History
- Opened: 26 December 2019
Location

Ganzhou West railway station is a railway station located in Nankang District, Ganzhou, Jiangxi, China. It is one of two passenger railway stations in Ganzhou, the other being the more central Ganzhou railway station which is served by conventional trains. It has six platforms and an avoiding line in each direction.

The station is on the future Beijing–Hong Kong (Taipei) corridor.

== History ==
The railway station was opened on 26 December 2019 with the Nanchang–Ganzhou high-speed railway.

Preceding station	China Railway High-speed	Following station
Ganxian North towards Nanchang	Nanchang–Ganzhou high-speed railway	Terminus
Terminus	Ganzhou–Shenzhen high-speed railway	Xinfeng West towards Shenzhen North
