= Sankou, Liuyang =

Urban town in Liuyang, Hunan, China

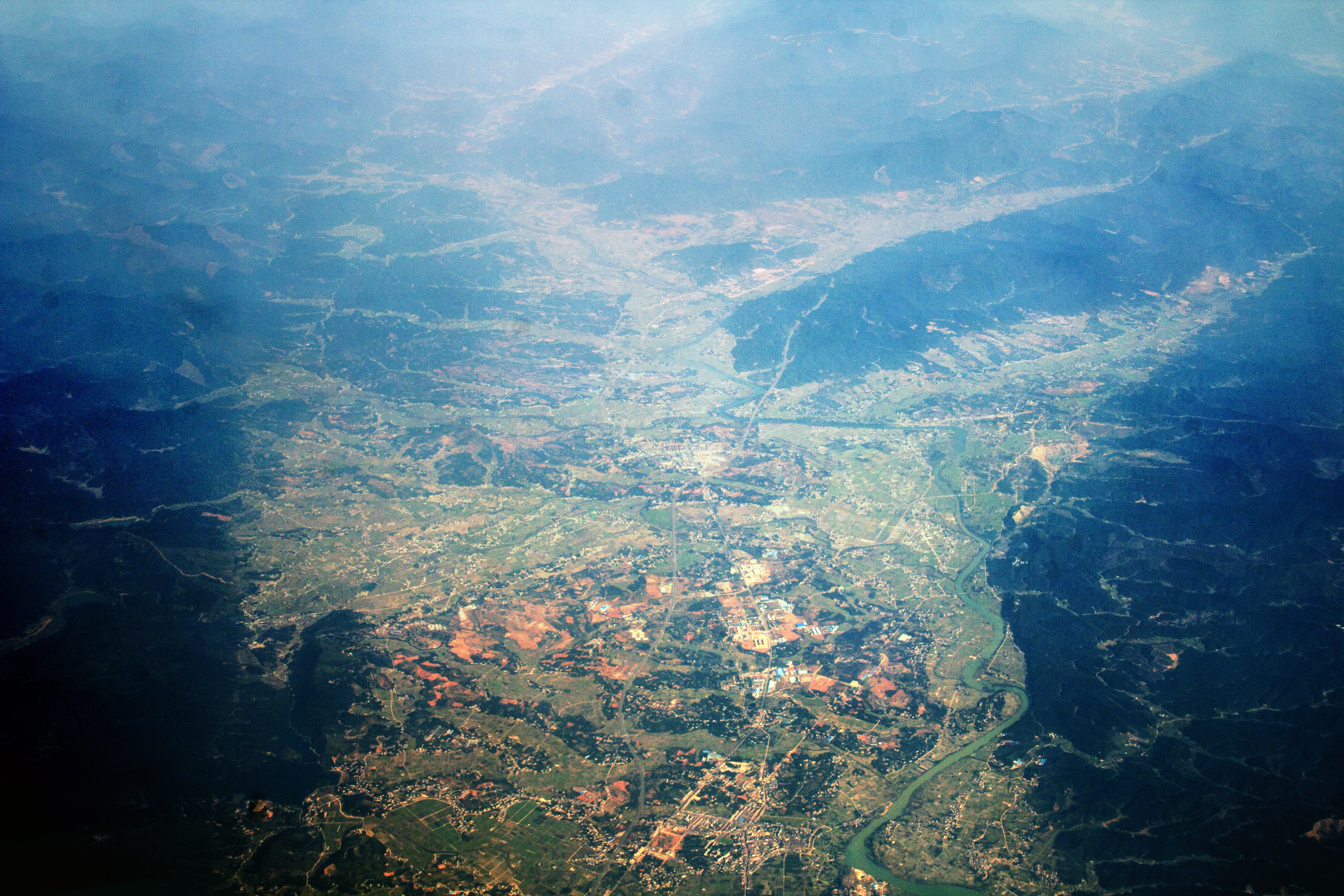
Sankou, Liuyang

Sankou Town (simplified Chinese: 三口镇; traditional Chinese: 三口鎮; pinyin: Sankou Zhen) is an urban town in Liuyang City, Changsha City, Hunan Province, People's Republic of China. As of the 2000 census it had a population of 20,990 and an area of 55.5 square kilometers. Sankou merged to Gugang town on November 18, 2015

== Cityscape ==
The town is divided into six villages and one community, the following areas: Guojiating Community, Jinyuan Village, Heyuan Village, Huacheng Village, Huaxiang Village, and Dongying Village (郭家亭社区，白露村、金园村、鹤源村、花城村、华湘村和东盈村).
