= Daqiao, Ganzhou =

Daqiao 大桥镇
- Town
- Location in Jiangxi Daqiao (China)
- Coordinates: 25°21′8″N 115°9′0″E
- Country: People's Republic of China
- Province: Jiangxi
- Prefecture-level city: Ganzhou
- County: Xinfeng County
- Time zone: UTC+8 (China Standard)

Daqiao (simplified Chinese: 大桥; traditional Chinese: 大橋; pinyin: Dàqiáo) is a town in Xinfeng County, Ganzhou, Jiangxi province, China. As of 2018, it has 3 residential communities and 6 villages under its administration.

== See also ==
- List of township-level divisions of Jiangxi
