= Chongxian Township, Xinfeng County =

Chongxian Township 崇仙乡
- Township
- Location in Jiangxi Chongxian Township (China)
- Coordinates: 25°6′48″N 114°48′42″E
- Country: People's Republic of China
- Province: Jiangxi
- Prefecture-level city: Ganzhou
- County: Xinfeng County
- Time zone: UTC+8 (China Standard)

Chongxian Township (simplified Chinese: 崇仙乡; traditional Chinese: 崇仙鄉; pinyin: Chóngxiān Xiāng) is a township in Xinfeng County, Jiangxi, China. As of 2020, it administers Chongxian Residential Neighborhood and the following fourteen villages:

- Chongxian Village
- Yuankeng Village (芫坑村)
- Luotang Village (罗塘村)
- Zhaixia Village (寨下村)
- Shankeng Village (山坑村)
- Shanba Village (山坝村)
- Xishui Village (西水村)
- Jingtou Village (迳头村)
- Dongshui Village (东水村)
- Laolong Village (老龙村)
- Yinqiao Village (荫桥村)
- Qiaotou Village (桥头村)
- Denggang Village (邓岗村)
- Bushe Village (布社村)

== See also ==
- List of township-level divisions of Jiangxi
