= Longmen County =

Longmen 龙门县 Lungmoon; Lungmen
- County
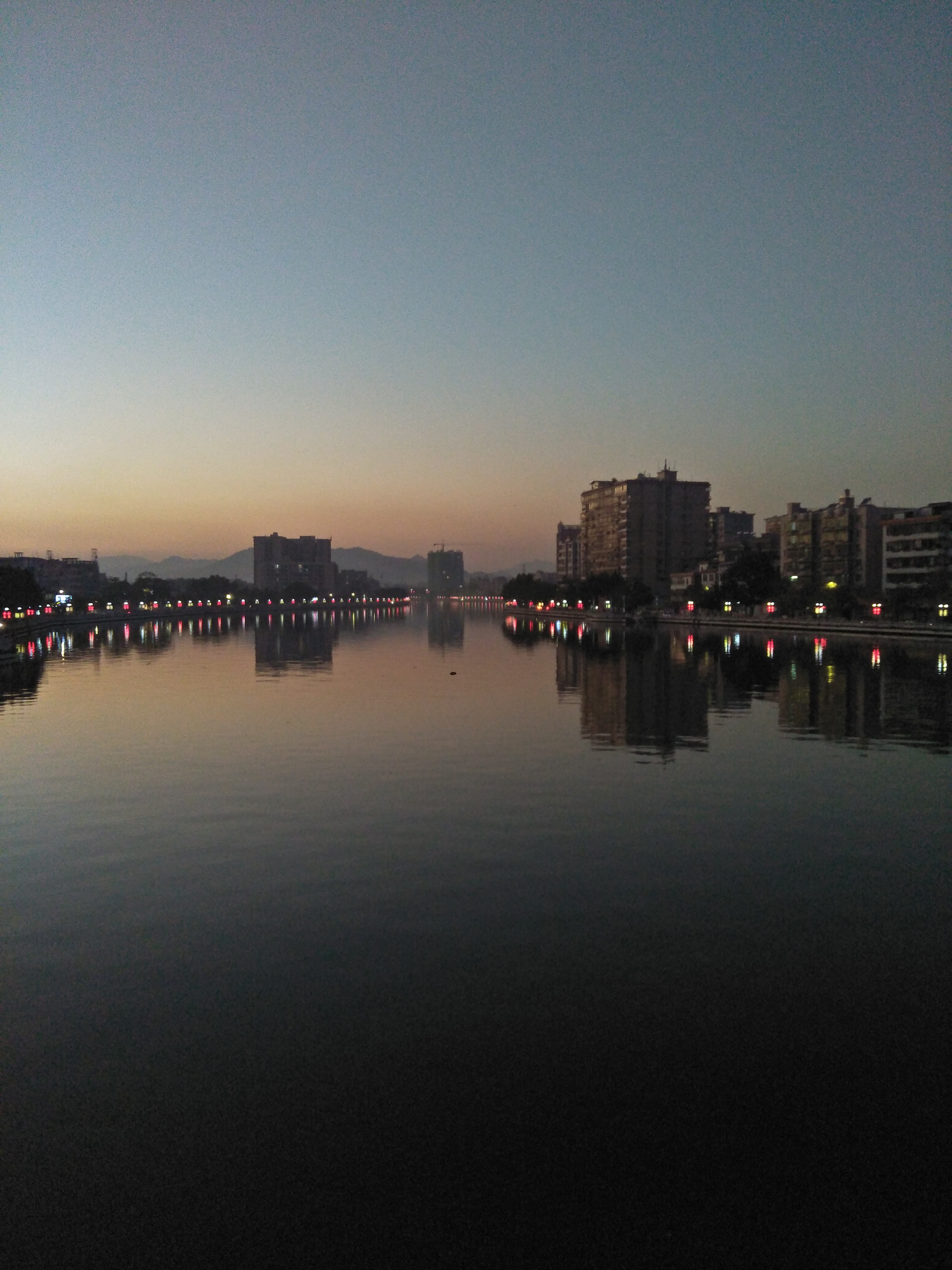
- Longmen Town at night, with Zengjiang River passing through

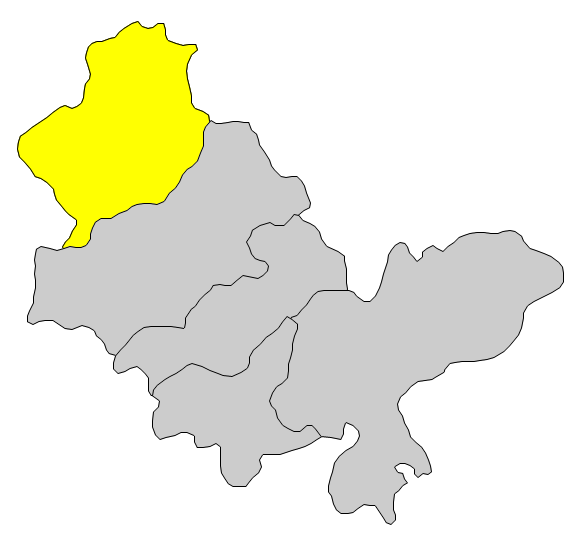
- Location in Huizhou City

- Location in Guangdong
- Coordinates: 23°44′N 114°15′E
- Country: People's Republic of China
- Province: Guangdong
- Prefecture-level city: Huizhou
- County seat: Longcheng Subdistrict (龙城街道)

Area
  - Total: 2,295 km^{2} (886 sq mi)

Population (2020 census)
  - Total: 319,183
  - Density: 139.1/km^{2} (360.2/sq mi)
- Time zone: UTC+8 (China Standard)
- Postal code: 516800
- Area code: 0752
- Website: longmen.gov.cn

Longmen
- Simplified Chinese: 龙门
- Traditional Chinese: 龍門
- Jyutping: Lung4-mun4
- Hanyu Pinyin: Lóngmén
- Postal: Lungmoon
- Literal meaning: Dragon Gate; Path-to-Success
Transcriptions
Standard Mandarin
- Hanyu Pinyin: Lóngmén
- Wade–Giles: Lung-mên
Yue: Cantonese
- Jyutping: Lung4-mun4

Longmen County, alternately romanized as Lungmoon, (Note: The Postal Map spelling is based on the name's Cantonese pronunciation. The name has also been romanized as Lung-men, Lung-mun, and Lung-mun-heën.) is a county of Guangdong, China, administered as part of the prefecture-level city of Huizhou. In 2020, Longmen County had a population of 319,183 residing in an area of 2,295 square kilometers (886 sq mi).

== Geography ==
The northernmost county-level division of Huizhou, Longmen County borders Dongyuan County to the east, Boluo County to the south, Zengcheng and Conghua to the west, and Xinfeng County to the north.

== Administrative divisions ==
Longmen County comprises two subdistrict, seven towns, and a township:

Name	Chinese (S)	Hanyu Pinyin	Population (2010)	Area (km^{2})
Longcheng Subdistrict	龙城街道	Lóngchéng Jiēdào	81,835	115.5
Pingling Subdistrict	平陵街道	Pínglíng Jiēdào	36,533	143
Mazha town	麻榨镇	Mázhà Zhèn	22,128	54.5
Yonghan town	永汉镇	Yǒnghàn Zhèn	47,680	215
Longtian town	龙田镇	Lóngtián Zhèn	17,810	195.5
Longtan town	龙潭镇	Lóngtán Zhèn	22,306	257
Dipai town	地派镇	Depài Zhèn	13,991	211
Longhua town	龙华镇	Lónghuá Zhèn	33,423	179
Longjiang town	龙江镇	Lóngjiāng Zhèn	23,167	54.5
Lantian Yao Ethnic Township	蓝田瑶族乡	Lántián Yáozú Xiāng	7,716	169

== Demographics ==
In addition to Mandarin, there are several local languages spoken within Longmen County: Cantonese, Hakka, Minnan, and ethnic-minority languages such as Yao and She.

== Notable people ==
- Chen Zhihao (born 1990), professional gamer
- Hu Tinglan, a Jinshi from Zengcheng in Ming Dynasty

== Transport ==
G0422 (Wuhan-Shenzhen), Guangdong S2 (Guangzhou-Heyuan) and Guangdong S14 (Shantou-Zhanjiang) pass through the county. The Shaoguan-Huizhou Expressway is currently under construction.

== Climate ==
Climate data for Longmen, elevation 86 m (282 ft), (1991–2020 normals, extremes 1981–2010)
Month	Jan	Feb	Mar	Apr	May	Jun	Jul	Aug	Sep	Oct	Nov	Dec	Year
Record high °C (°F)	28.8 (83.8)	30.0 (86.0)	33.5 (92.3)	34.2 (93.6)	36.7 (98.1)	37.6 (99.7)	38.5 (101.3)	38.4 (101.1)	37.9 (100.2)	35.6 (96.1)	33.7 (92.7)	29.8 (85.6)	38.5 (101.3)
Mean daily maximum °C (°F)	18.5 (65.3)	19.9 (67.8)	22.1 (71.8)	26.0 (78.8)	29.4 (84.9)	31.3 (88.3)	33.3 (91.9)	33.2 (91.8)	31.9 (89.4)	29.2 (84.6)	25.1 (77.2)	20.4 (68.7)	26.7 (80.0)
Daily mean °C (°F)	12.5 (54.5)	14.4 (57.9)	17.3 (63.1)	21.6 (70.9)	24.8 (76.6)	26.7 (80.1)	27.9 (82.2)	27.7 (81.9)	26.2 (79.2)	22.8 (73.0)	18.4 (65.1)	13.6 (56.5)	21.2 (70.1)
Mean daily minimum °C (°F)	8.5 (47.3)	10.8 (51.4)	14.1 (57.4)	18.5 (65.3)	21.8 (71.2)	23.9 (75.0)	24.5 (76.1)	24.5 (76.1)	22.7 (72.9)	18.5 (65.3)	13.9 (57.0)	9.2 (48.6)	17.6 (63.6)
Record low °C (°F)	−2.9 (26.8)	−0.5 (31.1)	−0.2 (31.6)	8.1 (46.6)	12.4 (54.3)	16.1 (61.0)	18.6 (65.5)	21.6 (70.9)	13.7 (56.7)	6.7 (44.1)	1.5 (34.7)	−4.4 (24.1)	−4.4 (24.1)
Average precipitation mm (inches)	60.0 (2.36)	73.9 (2.91)	159.5 (6.28)	238.1 (9.37)	335.7 (13.22)	527.9 (20.78)	212.8 (8.38)	271.6 (10.69)	147.0 (5.79)	48.4 (1.91)	47.2 (1.86)	45.7 (1.80)	2,167.8 (85.35)
Average precipitation days (≥ 0.1 mm)	7.8	11.5	16.1	16.7	19.4	21.3	17.4	18.0	11.8	5.1	6.2	6.3	157.6
Average relative humidity (%)	77	80	84	86	87	88	85	85	83	79	78	75	82
Mean monthly sunshine hours	119.6	86.5	72.4	77.6	106.6	125.3	188.3	179.5	178.4	189.7	165.5	153.3	1,642.7
Percentage possible sunshine	36	27	19	20	26	31	45	45	49	53	51	46	37
Source: China Meteorological Administration
