= Baitang, Guangdong =

Baitang 柏塘镇
- Town
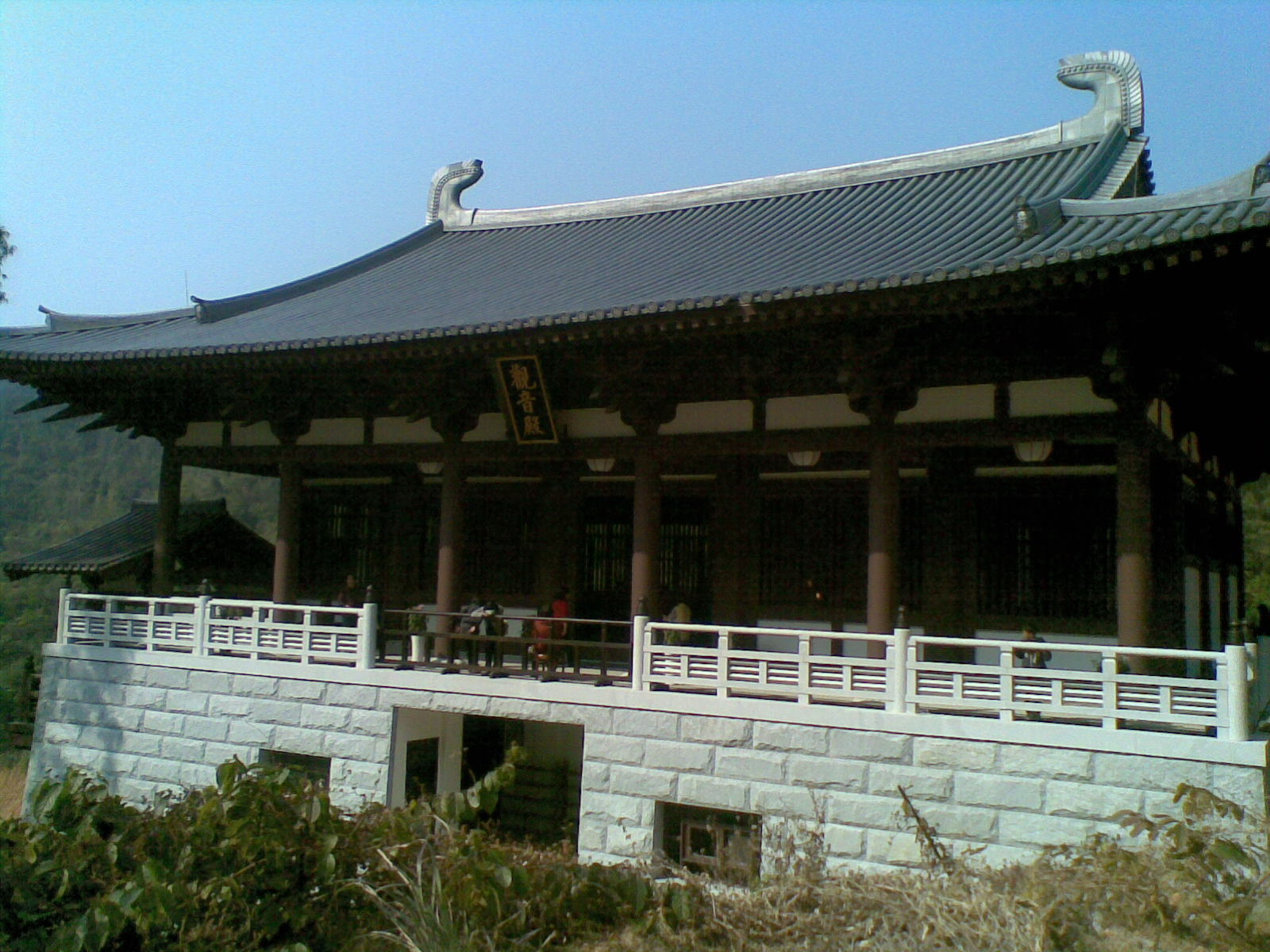
- Goddess of Mercy Hall (平安山观音殿)

- Location in Guangdong
- Coordinates: 23°23′37″N 114°21′59″E
- Country: People's Republic of China
- Province: Guangdong
- Prefecture-level city: Huizhou
- County: Boluo

Government
  - CCP Secretary: Liang Xiaoming (梁晓明)
  - Mayor: Luo Yaosheng (罗耀生)

Area
  - Town: 264.24 km^{2} (102.02 sq mi)
  - Urban: 4 km^{2} (1.5 sq mi)
- Highest elevation: 901 m (2,956 ft)
- Lowest elevation: 0 m (0 ft)

Population
  - Town: 56,700
  - Density: 215/km^{2} (556/sq mi)
- Time zone: UTC+8 (China Standard)
- Postal code: 516148
- Area code: (+86)752
- Website: bt.boluo.gov.cn

Baitang (Chinese: 柏塘; pinyin: Bǎitáng; Hakka: būgtŏng) is a town in northeastern Guangdong province, China, and is part of the Pearl River Delta. It is under the administration of Boluo County. The ancient beautiful town, one of the old revolutionary base areas, attracts foreign vacationers and investors. (Note: Since the revolution the old quarter has become a tourist destination. (革命老区，旅游圣地))

Local residents of Baitang are generally Hakka originally from Meizhou.

== Education ==
- Baitang Middle School (柏塘中学)
- Baitang Central Primary School (柏塘中心小学)
