= Xinfeng West railway station =

Railway station in Ganzhou, Jiangxi

Xinfeng West 信丰西
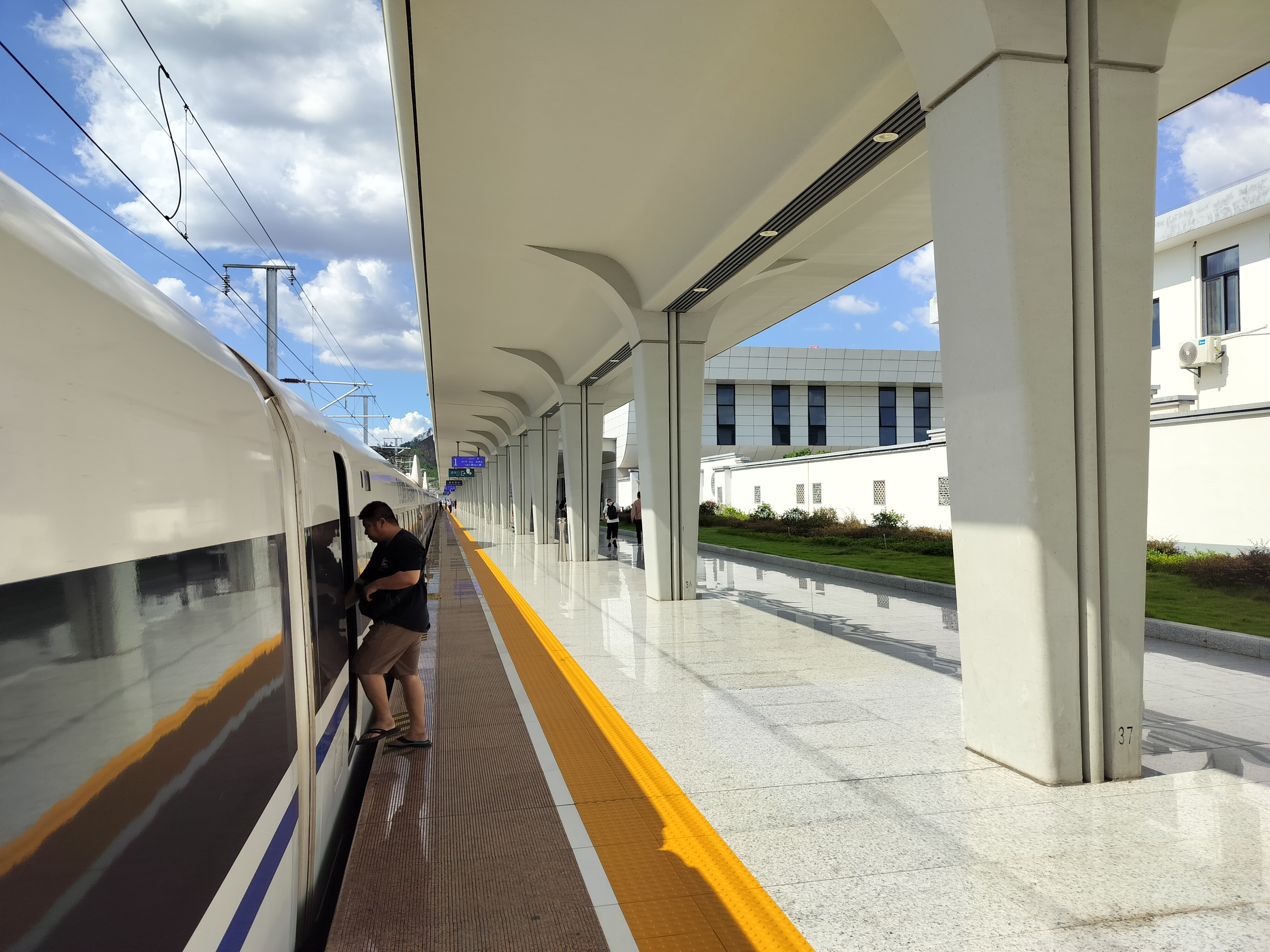
- Platform

General information
- Location: Xinfeng County, Ganzhou, Jiangxi; China
- Coordinates: 25°21′8.68″N 114°53′41.61″E
- Line: Ganzhou–Shenzhen high-speed railway

History
- Opened: 10 December 2021
Location

Xinfeng West railway station (Chinese: 信丰西站) is a railway station in Xinfeng County, Ganzhou, Jiangxi, China. It is an intermediate stop on the Ganzhou–Shenzhen high-speed railway. It opened with the line on 10 December 2021.

Preceding station	China Railway High-speed	Following station
Ganzhou West Terminus	Ganzhou–Shenzhen high-speed railway	Longnan East towards Shenzhen North
