= Xinfeng River =

Coordinates: 23°44′42″N 114°41′30″E

Xinfeng
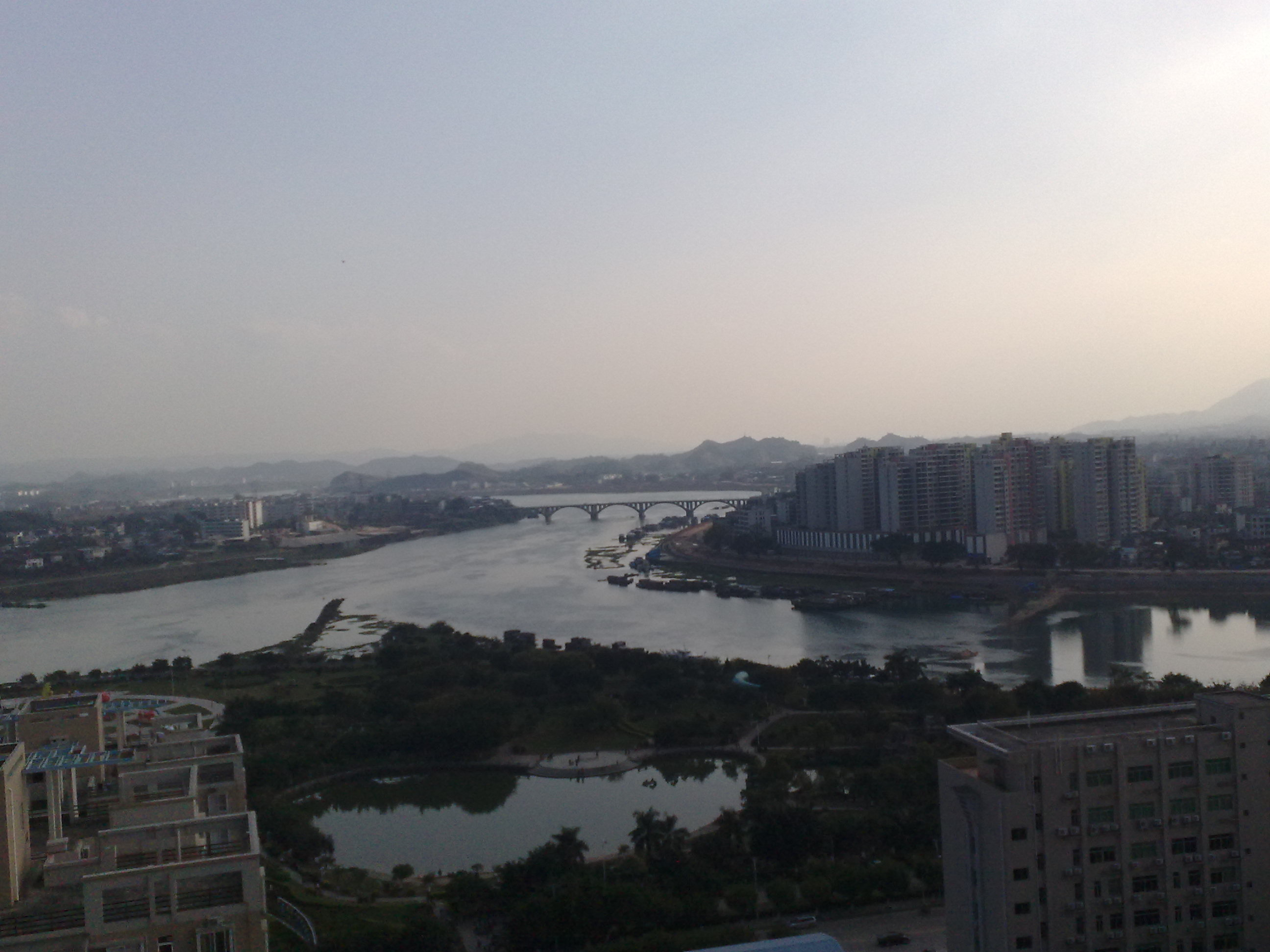
- Confluence of Xinfeng and Dong River in Heyuan

Location
- Country: China

Physical characteristics
- Mouth
  - location: Dong River

The Xinfeng River (postal: Sunfung River; Chinese: 新丰江; pinyin: Xīnfēng Jiāng) is a river in Guangdong Province, China and a tributary of the Dong River. Its confluence with the Dong is in Heyuan. The river is dammed by the Xinfengjiang Dam, creating the large Xinfengjiang Reservoir.
