= Longnan railway station (Jiangxi) =

Railway station in Ganzhou, Jiangxi, China

Coordinates: 24.9231°N 114.8729°E

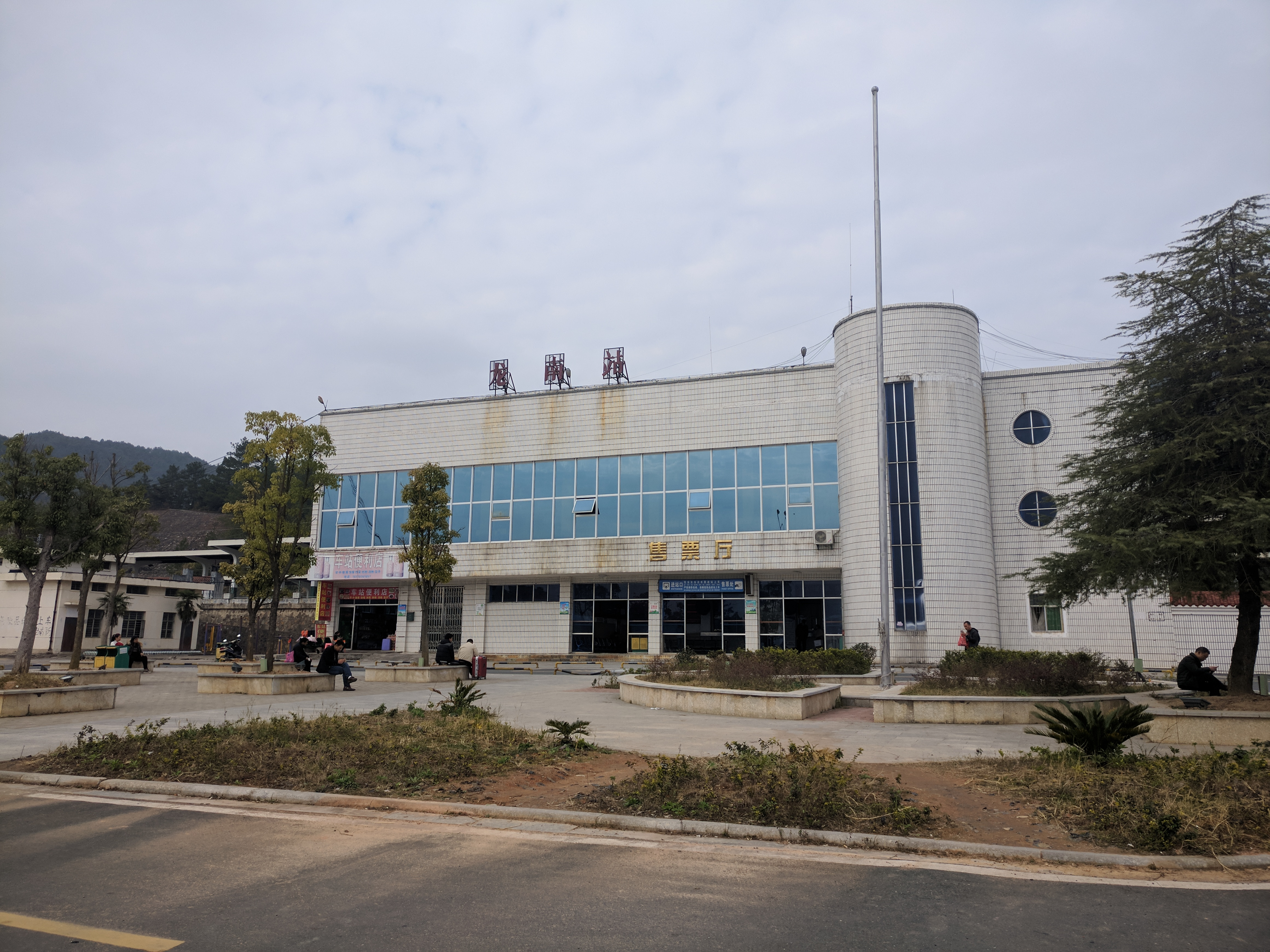
The entrance and the station building of Longnan Railway Station.

Longnan railway station (simplified Chinese: 龙南站; traditional Chinese: 龍南站; pinyin: Lóngnán Zhàn) serves Longnan County in the city of Ganzhou in Jiangxi province, China. Six trains pass through the station every day.

Preceding station	China Railway	Following station
Xinfeng towards Beijing West	Beijing–Kowloon railway	Dingnan towards Hung Hom
