= S21 Guangzhou–Huidong Expressway =

Road in Guangdong, China

Guangzhou–Huidong Expressway

Location
- Country: China
- Province: Guangdong

Highway system
- Transport in China

S21 Guanghui Expressway (simplified Chinese: 广惠高速公路; traditional Chinese: 廣惠高速公路; pinyin: Guǎnghuì Gāosùgōnglù) is a route that connects the cities of Guangzhou and Huizhou in the Chinese province of Guangdong.
