= Heyuan railway station =

Railway station in Heyuan, China

Coordinates: 23.7610°N 114.6817°E

Heyuan (Chinese: 河源站) is a railway station in the Dongbu Subdistrict (东埔街道), Yuancheng District, Heyuan City, Guangdong Province, China.

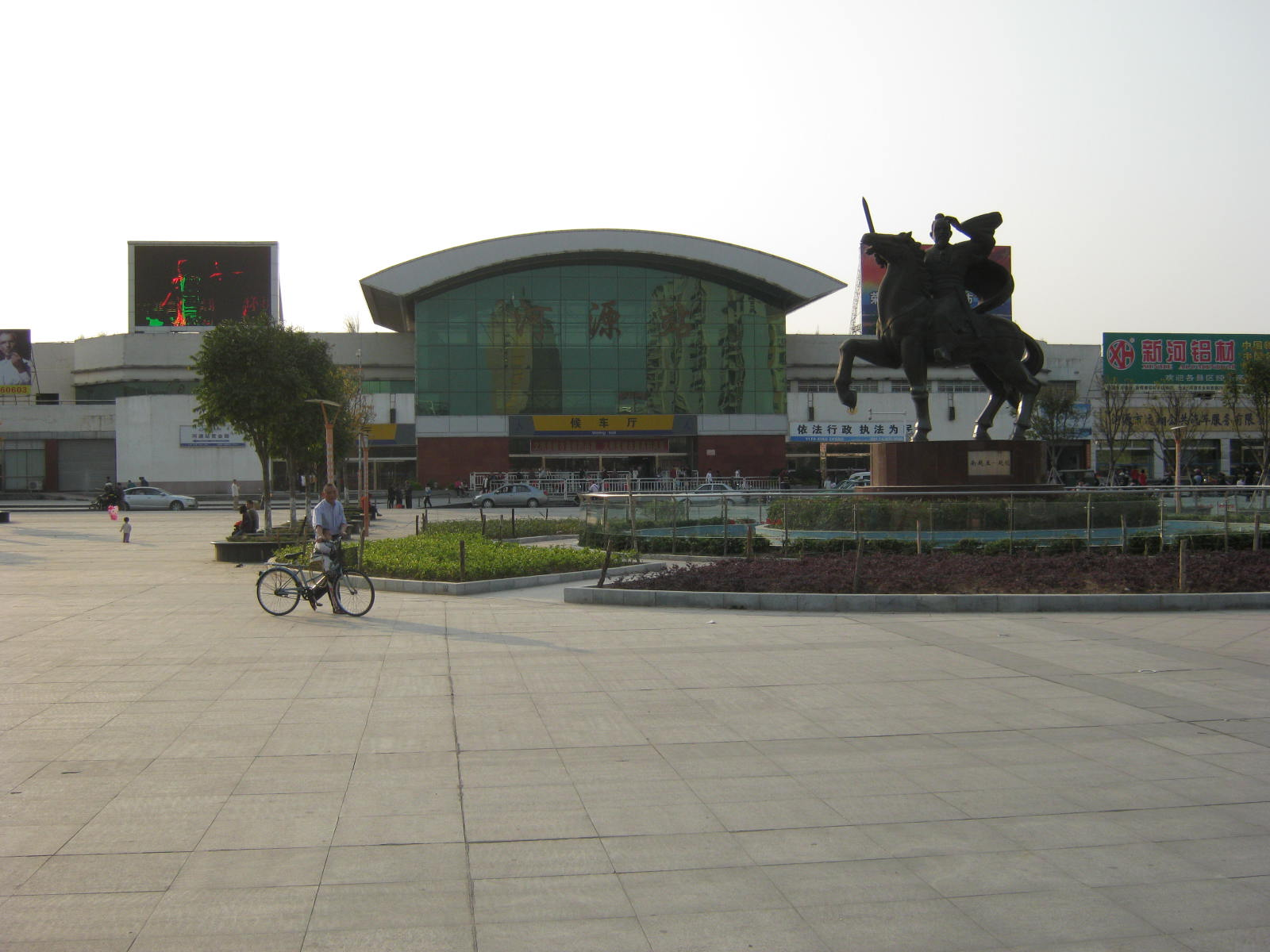
Heyuan railway station

Preceding station	China Railway	Following station
Longchuan towards Beijing West	Beijing–Kowloon railway	Huizhou towards Hung Hom
