= Zhangping railway station =

Railway station in Longyan, Fujian

Zhangping 漳平
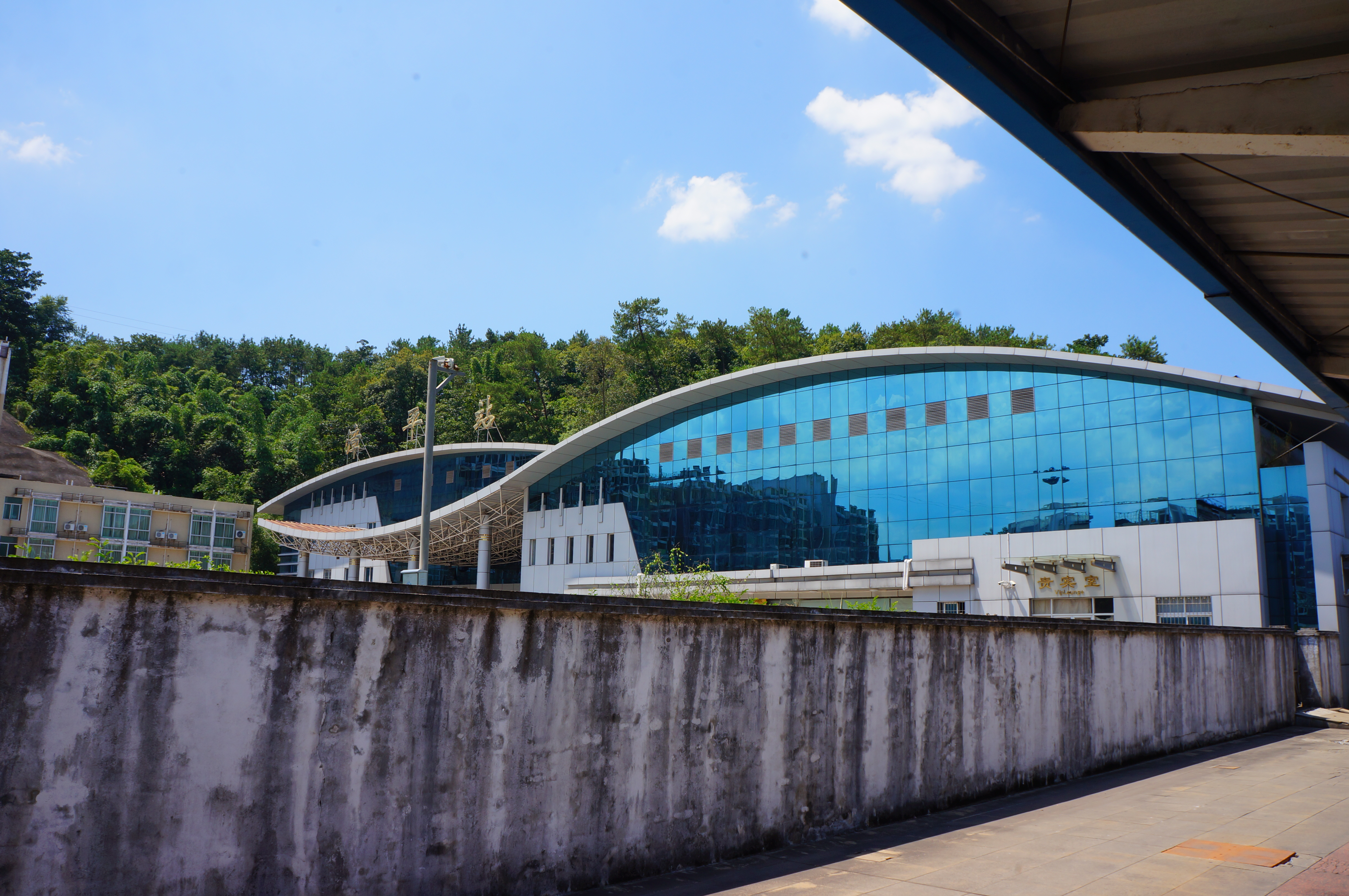
- Zhangping railway station in 2017

General information
- Location: Zhangping, Longyan, Fujian; China
- Coordinates: 25.308361°N 117.415341°E
- Lines: Zhangping–Longchuan railway; Yingtan–Xiamen railway; Zhangping–Quanzhou–Xiaocuo railway

History
- Closed: 4 January 2019
Location

Zhangping railway station (Chinese: 漳平站) is a railway station in Zhangping, Longyan, Fujian, China. It formerly saw passenger services, but is now only used for freight.

== History ==
A new station building was built and opened in 2007.

The final passenger service ran on 4 January 2019.

== See also ==
Zhangping West railway station: a station on the Nanping–Longyan railway, opened on 29 December 2018
