= Dingnan railway station =

Railway station in Ganzhou, China

Coordinates: 24.7778°N 115.0000°E

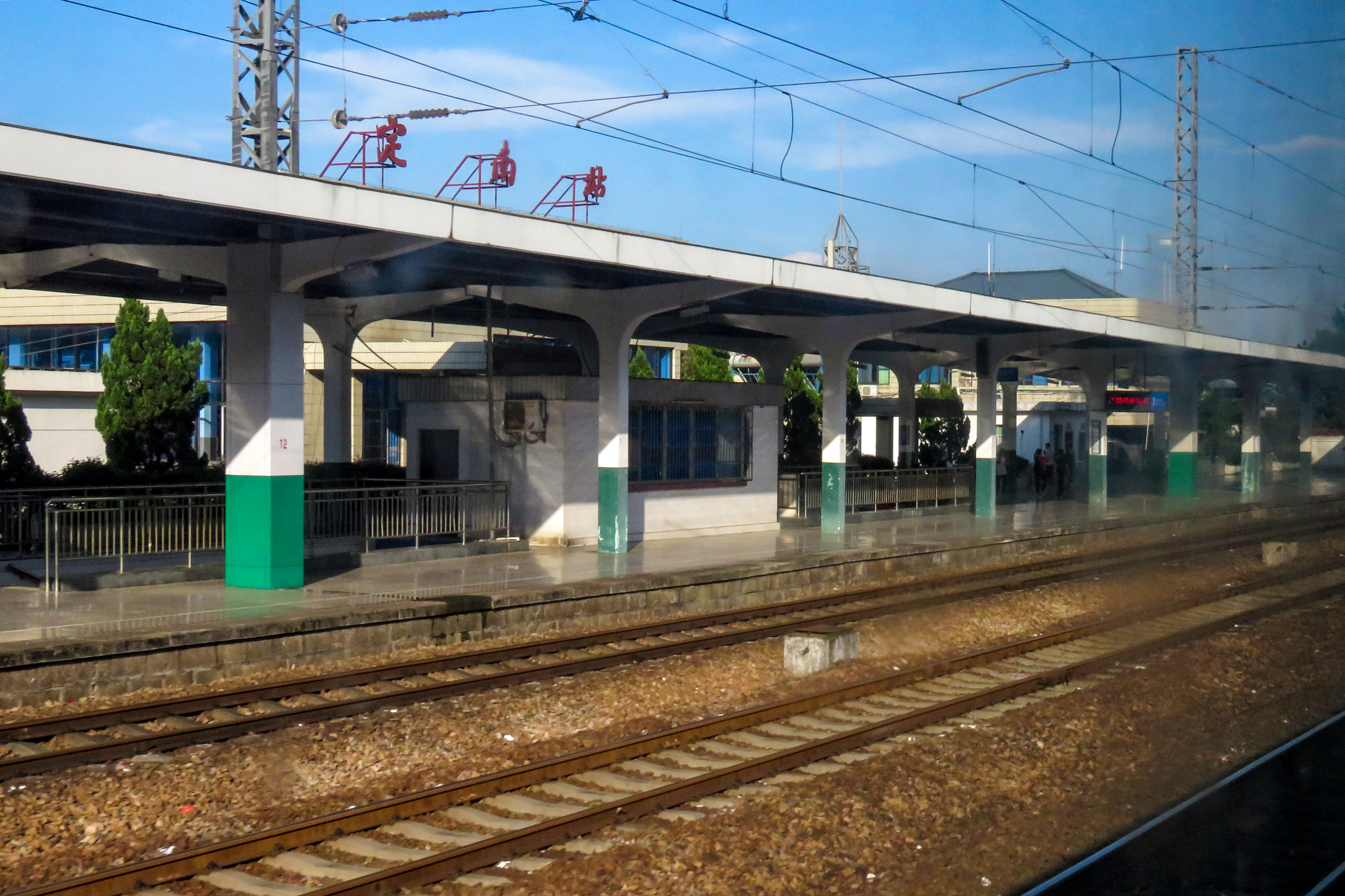
Platform of Dingnan Railway Station

Dingnan railway station (Chinese: 定南站; pinyin: Dìngnán Zhàn) serves the county of Dingnan in the city of Ganzhou in Jiangxi province, China.

Preceding station	China Railway	Following station
Longnan towards Beijing West	Beijing–Kowloon railway	Heping towards Hung Hom
