= Xinfeng County, Jiangxi =

Xinfeng County 信丰县 Sinfeng
- County
- Location in Jiangxi
- Coordinates: 25°23′13″N 114°55′23″E
- Country: People's Republic of China
- Province: Jiangxi
- Prefecture-level city: Ganzhou

Area
  - Total: 2,878 km^{2} (1,111 sq mi)

Population (resident population at the end of 2025)
  - Total: 672,406
  - Density: 233.6/km^{2} (605/sq mi)
- Postal Code: 341600

Xinfeng County (simplified Chinese: 信丰县; traditional Chinese: 信豐縣; pinyin: Xìnfēng Xiàn) is a county under the jurisdiction of the prefecture-level city of Ganzhou, in the far south of Jiangxi province, bordering Guangdong province to the west.

== Administration ==
The county executive, legislature, and court are located in the Town of Jiading (嘉定镇), together with the local party headquarters and Public Security Bureau branches.

The county is divided into 16 towns and townships, and one provincial-level industrial park. This is in turn divided into 260 administrative villages and 27 neighbourhood committees.

In the present, Xinfeng County has 13 towns and 3 townships.

13 towns

- Jiading (嘉定镇)
- Datangbu (大塘埠镇)
- Gubei (古陂镇)
- Daqiao (大桥镇)
- Xintian (新田镇)
- Anxi (安西镇)
- Xiaojiang (小江镇)
- Tieshikou (铁石口镇)
- Da'a (大阿镇)
- Youshan (油山镇)
- Xiaohe (小河镇)
- Xiniu (西牛镇)
- Zhengping (正平镇)

3 townships

- Hushan (虎山乡)
- Chongxian (崇仙乡)
- Wanlong (万隆乡)

== Climate ==
Climate data for Xinfeng, elevation 204 m (669 ft), (1991–2020 normals, extremes 1981–present)
| Month | Jan | Feb | Mar | Apr | May | Jun | Jul | Aug | Sep | Oct | Nov | Dec | Year |
|---|---|---|---|---|---|---|---|---|---|---|---|---|---|
| Record high °C (°F) | 27.6 (81.7) | 31.9 (89.4) | 31.8 (89.2) | 34.4 (93.9) | 36.3 (97.3) | 37.9 (100.2) | 40.0 (104.0) | 40.0 (104.0) | 38.5 (101.3) | 36.6 (97.9) | 33.4 (92.1) | 29.3 (84.7) | 40.0 (104.0) |
| Mean daily maximum °C (°F) | 13.5 (56.3) | 16.2 (61.2) | 19.2 (66.6) | 25.1 (77.2) | 29.1 (84.4) | 31.7 (89.1) | 34.4 (93.9) | 33.9 (93.0) | 31.1 (88.0) | 26.9 (80.4) | 21.7 (71.1) | 15.9 (60.6) | 24.9 (76.8) |
| Daily mean °C (°F) | 8.9 (48.0) | 11.3 (52.3) | 14.6 (58.3) | 20.3 (68.5) | 24.3 (75.7) | 27.1 (80.8) | 29.0 (84.2) | 28.5 (83.3) | 25.9 (78.6) | 21.5 (70.7) | 16.2 (61.2) | 10.6 (51.1) | 19.8 (67.7) |
| Mean daily minimum °C (°F) | 5.8 (42.4) | 8.1 (46.6) | 11.6 (52.9) | 16.9 (62.4) | 21.0 (69.8) | 24.0 (75.2) | 25.2 (77.4) | 24.9 (76.8) | 22.4 (72.3) | 17.7 (63.9) | 12.4 (54.3) | 7.0 (44.6) | 16.4 (61.6) |
| Record low °C (°F) | −3.4 (25.9) | −1.7 (28.9) | −1.5 (29.3) | 5.4 (41.7) | 9.8 (49.6) | 15.9 (60.6) | 18.8 (65.8) | 20.1 (68.2) | 14.8 (58.6) | 6.3 (43.3) | 0.8 (33.4) | −5.1 (22.8) | −5.1 (22.8) |
| Average precipitation mm (inches) | 72.6 (2.86) | 93.8 (3.69) | 177.5 (6.99) | 182.3 (7.18) | 229.8 (9.05) | 244.8 (9.64) | 138.4 (5.45) | 158.0 (6.22) | 76.2 (3.00) | 41.7 (1.64) | 54.5 (2.15) | 47.4 (1.87) | 1,517 (59.74) |
| Average precipitation days (≥ 0.1 mm) | 10.6 | 12.1 | 17.8 | 17.0 | 18.1 | 17.3 | 13.4 | 15.1 | 10.4 | 5.8 | 7.8 | 8.3 | 153.7 |
| Average snowy days | 0.6 | 0.5 | 0.1 | 0 | 0 | 0 | 0 | 0 | 0 | 0 | 0 | 0.3 | 1.5 |
| Average relative humidity (%) | 77 | 78 | 82 | 80 | 80 | 80 | 74 | 76 | 76 | 71 | 74 | 73 | 77 |
| Mean monthly sunshine hours | 86.8 | 80.8 | 73.4 | 96.1 | 121.9 | 138.2 | 220.0 | 203.0 | 166.4 | 162.5 | 134.9 | 121.9 | 1,605.9 |
| Percentage possible sunshine | 26 | 25 | 20 | 25 | 29 | 34 | 53 | 51 | 46 | 46 | 42 | 37 | 36 |
Source: China Meteorological Administrationall-time May low
