= Dongyuan County =

Dongyuan 东源县
- County
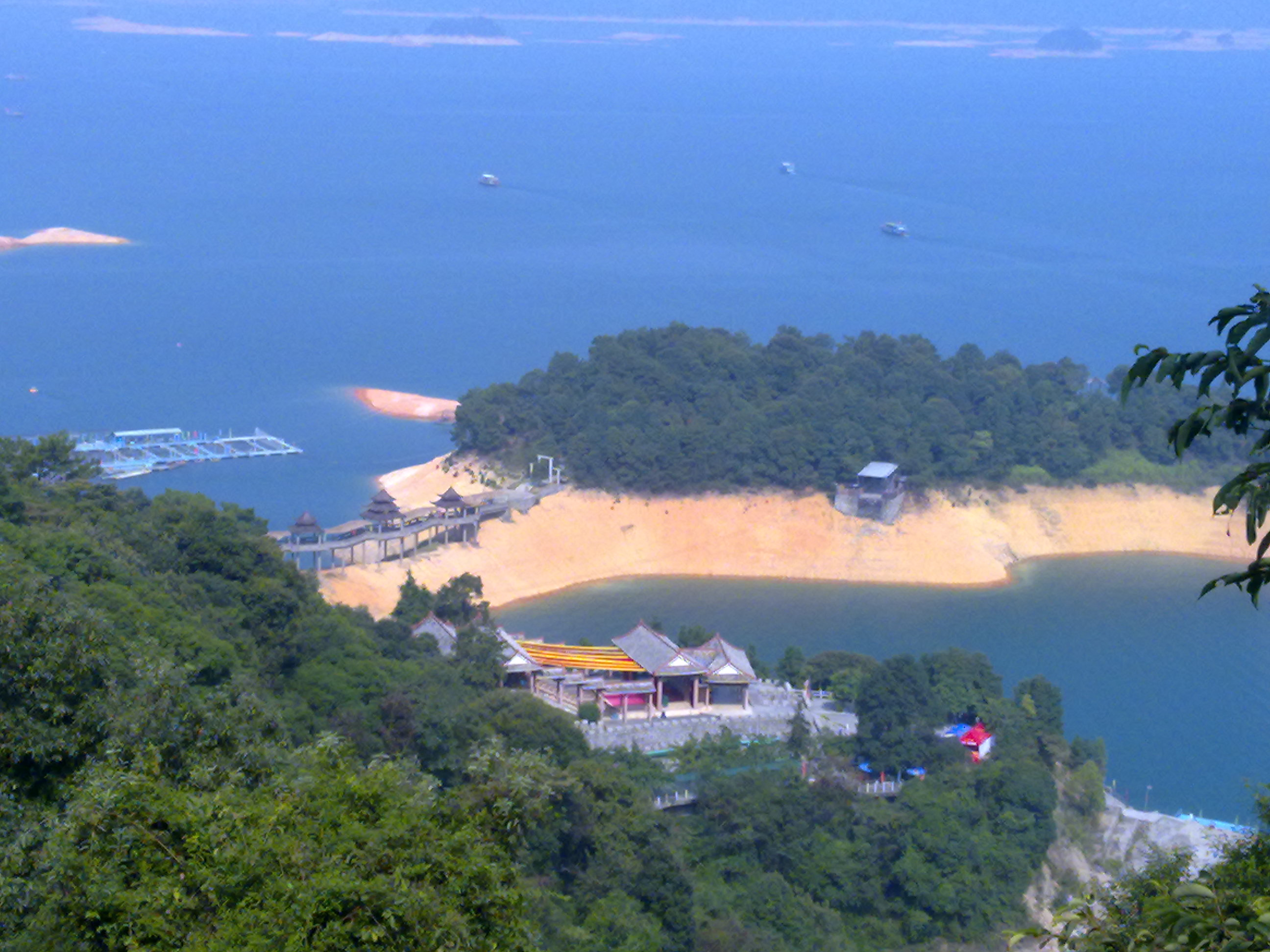

- Location in Guangdong
- Coordinates: 23°58′N 114°51′E
- Country: People's Republic of China
- Province: Guangdong
- Prefecture-level city: Heyuan

Area
  - Total: 4,070 km^{2} (1,570 sq mi)

Population (2020)
  - Total: 348,386
  - Density: 85.6/km^{2} (222/sq mi)
- Time zone: UTC+8 (China Standard)

Dongyuan
- Traditional Chinese: 東源
- Simplified Chinese: 东源
- Postal: Tungyun
Transcriptions
Standard Mandarin
- Hanyu Pinyin: Dōngyuán
- Wade–Giles: Tung^{1}-yüan^{2}

Dongyuan County (simplified Chinese: 东源县; traditional Chinese: 東源縣; pinyin: Dōngyuán Xiàn) is a county in Heyuan, Guangdong Province, China.

== Transport ==
- Heyuan North railway station on Ganzhou-Shenzhen high-speed railway is located here.
