= Heyuan =

Heyuan 河源市
- Prefecture-level city
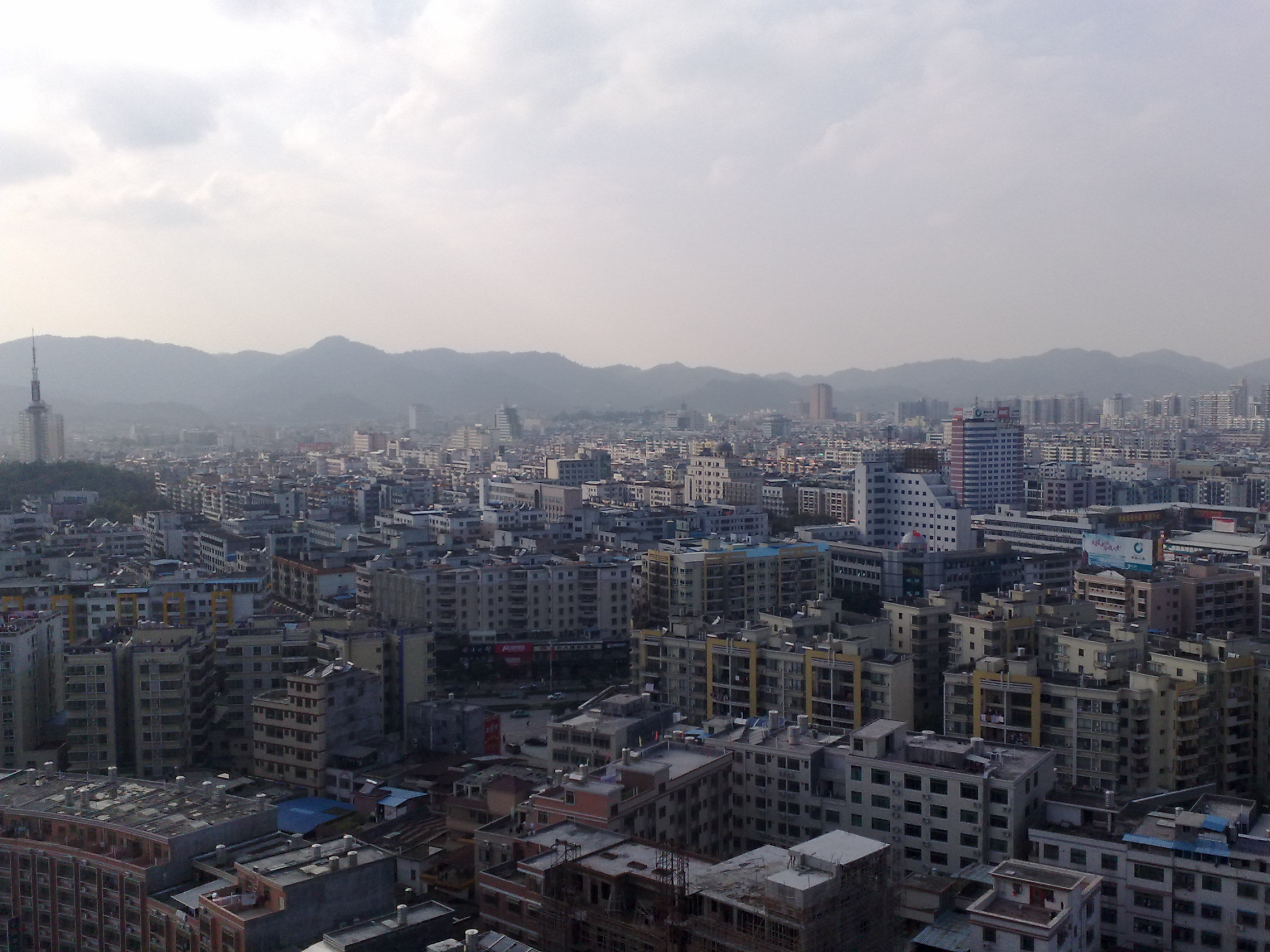

- Location of Heyuan City jurisdiction in Guangdong
- Interactive map of Heyuan
- Location of the city center in Guangdong Heyuan (China)
- Coordinates (Heyuan municipal government): 23°44′39″N 114°42′01″E
- Country: People's Republic of China
- Province: Guangdong
- Municipal seat: Yuancheng District

Area
  - Prefecture-level city: 15,653.63 km^{2} (6,043.90 sq mi)
  - Urban: 361.5 km^{2} (139.6 sq mi)
  - Metro: 4,370.6 km^{2} (1,687.5 sq mi)
- Elevation: 39 m (128 ft)

Population (2020 Census)
  - Prefecture-level city: 2,837,686
  - Density: 181.2797/km^{2} (469.5124/sq mi)
  - Urban: 703,607
  - Urban density: 1,946/km^{2} (5,041/sq mi)
  - Metro: 1,051,993
  - Metro density: 240.70/km^{2} (623.40/sq mi)

GDP
  - Prefecture-level city: CN¥ 127.4 billion US$ 19.7 billion
  - Per capita: CN¥ 44,886; US$ 6,958
- Time zone: UTC+8 (China Standard)
- Postal code: 517000
- Area code: 0762
- ISO 3166 code: CN-GD-16
- License Plate: 粤P

Heyuan
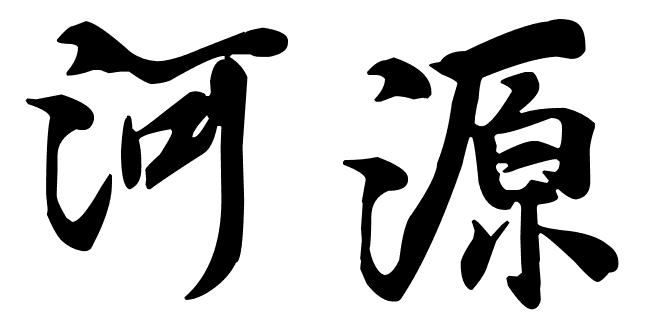
- "Heyuan", as written in Chinese calligraphy
- Chinese: 河源
- Hanyu Pinyin: Héyuán
- Cantonese Yale: Hòhyùhn
- Postal: Hoyun
- Literal meaning: River spring
Transcriptions
Standard Mandarin
- Hanyu Pinyin: Héyuán
- Gwoyeu Romatzyh: Heryuan
- Wade–Giles: Ho^{2}-yüan^{2}
- IPA: [xɤ̌.ɥɛ̌n]
Yue: Cantonese
- Yale Romanization: Hòhyùhn
- Jyutping: Ho4jyun4
- IPA: [hɔ˩.jyn˩]

Heyuan (Chinese: 河源; Jyutping: ho4 jyun4, Hakka: Fò-Ngiàn), also known as Ho Yun, is a prefecture-level city of Guangdong, China. As of the 2020 census, its population was 2,837,686 whom 1,051,993 lived in the built-up (or metro) area made of Yuancheng urban District and Dongyuan County largely being urbanized. Zijin County itself is quickly being conurbated in the agglomeration. The majority of the people are Hakka. The city includes many rainforests and the largest lake in Guangdong: Xinfengjiang Reservoir. The literal meaning of the city's name is "origin of the river". It has recently been officially titled as the "Hometown of the Dinosaur in China", due to the thousands of dinosaur egg fossils that have been unearthed in its vicinity.

== Geography ==
Heyuan is located in the northeastern region of Guangdong, in the upper reaches of the Dong River at its confluence with the Xinfeng River. Its latitude spans 23° 10'–24° 47' N, and longitude 114° 14'–115° 36' E. It borders Huizhou to the south, Ganzhou (Jiangxi) to the north, Meizhou to the east, and Shaoguan to the west. Heyuan is a regional hub that connects the coastal areas of Guangdong and the interior countryside.

Heyuan is rich in natural resources and fertile land. There are 1,000 km^{2} (390 sq mi) of cultivated land, 13,600 km^{2} (5,300 sq mi) of hilly land, and 640 square kilometres (250 sq mi) of water area. Many mineral deposits such as iron ore, tungsten, tin, fluorite are found in Heyuan.

=== Climate ===
Heyuan has a monsoon-influenced humid subtropical climate (Köppen Cfa), with short, mild to warm winters, and long, hot, humid summers. Winter begins sunny and dry but becomes progressively wetter and cloudier. Spring is generally overcast and often rainy, while summer continues to be rainy though is much sunnier; there are 9.1 days annually with 50 mm (1.97 in) of rainfall. Autumn is sunny and dry. The monthly 24-hour average temperature ranges from 13.1 °C (55.6 °F) in January to 28.5 °C (83.3 °F) in July, and the annual mean is 21.83 °C (71.3 °F). The annual rainfall is 1,927 mm (76 in), and is delivered in bulk (47%) from April to June. With monthly percent possible sunshine ranging from 23% in March to 55% in October and November, the city receives 1,842 hours of bright sunshine annually.

Climate data for Heyuan, elevation 71 m (233 ft), (1991–2020 normals, extremes 1953–present)
Month	Jan	Feb	Mar	Apr	May	Jun	Jul	Aug	Sep	Oct	Nov	Dec	Year
Record high °C (°F)	29.1 (84.4)	30.5 (86.9)	33.0 (91.4)	35.8 (96.4)	39.2 (102.6)	38.6 (101.5)	39.0 (102.2)	39.3 (102.7)	38.0 (100.4)	36.9 (98.4)	34.2 (93.6)	30.6 (87.1)	39.3 (102.7)
Mean daily maximum °C (°F)	18.2 (64.8)	19.8 (67.6)	22.3 (72.1)	26.4 (79.5)	29.9 (85.8)	31.7 (89.1)	33.6 (92.5)	33.4 (92.1)	32.2 (90.0)	29.1 (84.4)	24.9 (76.8)	19.9 (67.8)	26.8 (80.2)
Daily mean °C (°F)	13.0 (55.4)	14.9 (58.8)	17.8 (64.0)	22.1 (71.8)	25.5 (77.9)	27.5 (81.5)	28.7 (83.7)	28.4 (83.1)	27.3 (81.1)	24.1 (75.4)	19.6 (67.3)	14.5 (58.1)	22.0 (71.5)
Mean daily minimum °C (°F)	9.5 (49.1)	11.5 (52.7)	14.6 (58.3)	19.0 (66.2)	22.4 (72.3)	24.6 (76.3)	25.4 (77.7)	25.2 (77.4)	23.9 (75.0)	20.3 (68.5)	15.7 (60.3)	10.8 (51.4)	18.6 (65.4)
Record low °C (°F)	−3.8 (25.2)	−1.9 (28.6)	2.0 (35.6)	7.0 (44.6)	12.3 (54.1)	17.0 (62.6)	18.5 (65.3)	20.0 (68.0)	14.0 (57.2)	7.8 (46.0)	2.1 (35.8)	−1.4 (29.5)	−3.8 (25.2)
Average precipitation mm (inches)	58.7 (2.31)	69.8 (2.75)	150.2 (5.91)	211.9 (8.34)	287.7 (11.33)	397.5 (15.65)	214.7 (8.45)	244.2 (9.61)	143.4 (5.65)	44.3 (1.74)	38.6 (1.52)	46.3 (1.82)	1,907.3 (75.08)
Average precipitation days (≥ 0.1 mm)	7.3	10.2	15.1	15.4	17.6	19.6	16.9	17.4	11.3	4.6	5.6	6.1	147.1
Average relative humidity (%)	68	73	77	78	79	82	78	79	74	67	67	65	74
Mean monthly sunshine hours	129.1	99.4	87.9	94.4	123.5	142.0	202.3	188.8	179.9	188.4	166.2	153.8	1,755.7
Percentage possible sunshine	38	31	24	25	30	35	49	47	49	53	51	47	40
Source: China Meteorological Administration extremesAll-time May record low

== Geology ==
The city's museum boasts the Guinness World Record for the largest collection of dinosaur eggs, with 10,008 individual samples as of 2004. Dinosaur skeletons and fossilized footprints have also been found nearby.

=== Findings ===
A dinosaur egg fossil dated back to the Late Cretaceous was discovered by primary school student named Zhang Yangzhe while playing near the Dong River in July 2019. The boy's mother, Li Xiaofang, later contacted the Heyuan Dinosaur Museum members, and under their excavation guidance more than 10 dinosaur egg fossils each about 9 centimeters in diameter and dating back to 66 million years were revealed.

== Language ==
Heyuan is a Hakka Chinese speaking city.

In the greater part of areas in the city, Dongyuan County, Lianping County, Heping County, Longchuan County etc., it belongs to the Yuezhong dialect group, while in Zijin County and part of Longchuan County, it belongs to the Yuetai dialect group.

Also, in some areas on the banks of the Dongjiang, Dongjiang Bendihua is in general use. Its classification is disputed between the Yuezhong division of Hakka and the Huihe division of Yue.

== Administration ==
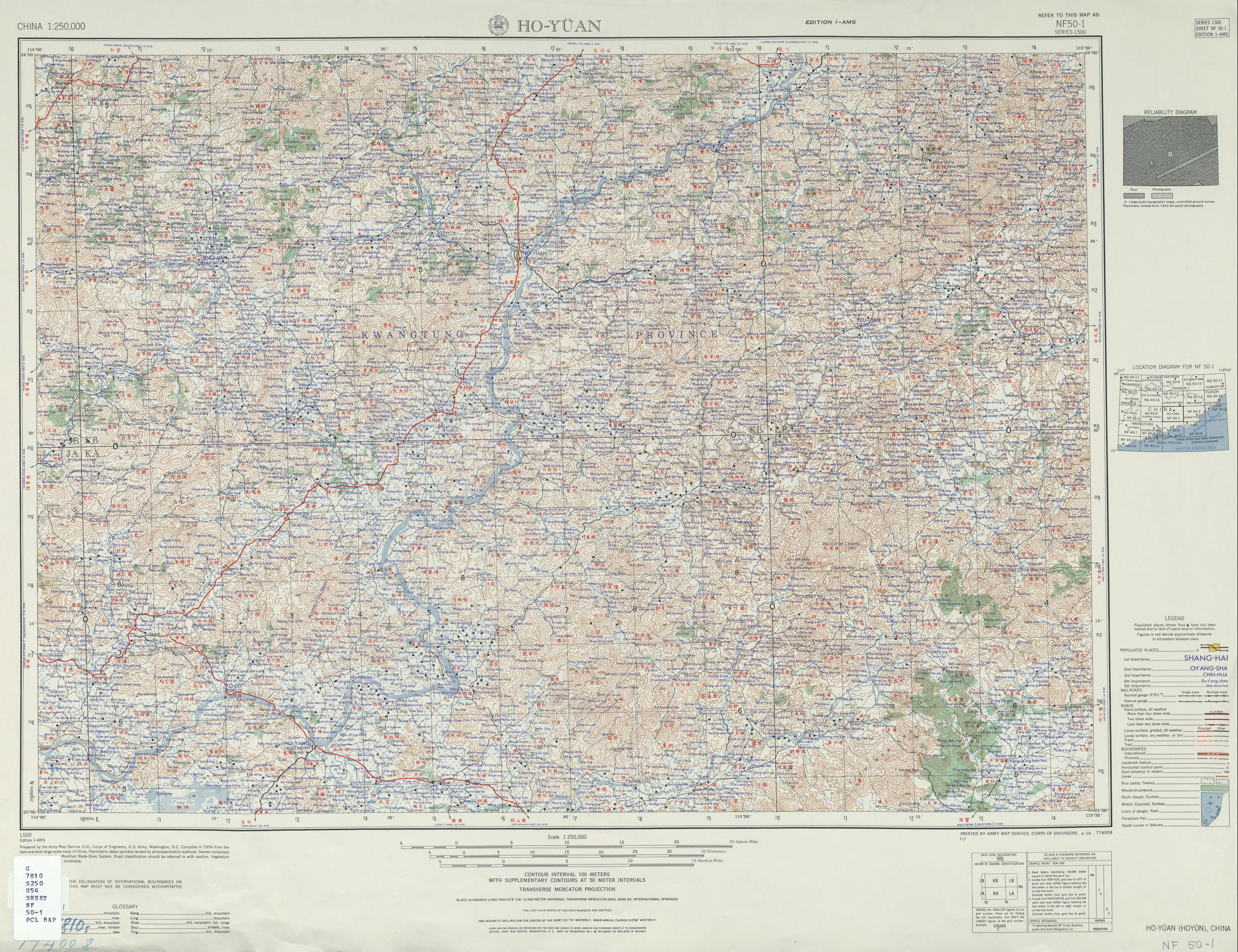
Map of Heyuan (labeled as HO-YÜAN (HOYÜN) (Walled) 河源) and surrounding region (AMS, 1954)

Heyuan City administers Yuancheng District, Dongyuan County, Heping County, Longchuan County, Zijin County and Lianping County. The total area is 15,800 square kilometres (6,100 sq mi). Heyuan city and its districts have a population of 3.2194 million. The municipality seat is in Yuancheng District.

Map	Name	Simplified Chinese	Hanyu Pinyin	Population (2010 census)	Area (km^{2})	Density (/km^{2})
	Yuancheng District	源城区	Yuánchéng Qū	463,907	361.47	1,283
	Zijin County	紫金县	Zǐjīn Xiàn	640,133	3,635.13	225
	Longchuan County	龙川县	Lóngchuān Xiàn	694,480	3,081.31	225
	Lianping County	连平县	Liánpíng Xiàn	337,002	2,275.08	148
	Heping County	和平县	Hépíng Xiàn	374,709	2,291.45	164
	Dongyuan County	东源县	Dōngyuán Xiàn	439,964	4,009.17	110

== Economy ==
Heyuan city is a major economic and transportation hub for the Beijing-Kowloon Railway and the Guangzhou-Meizhou-Shantou Railway which crosses the city. There is also a marshalling station at Longchuan, which is the biggest in southern China.

State Highway 105 and 205 run through the city. The Dong River, which flows through Heyuan, is an important and strategic waterway that allows huge cargo ships to transport goods to Huizhou, Dongguan, and Guangzhou.

Heyuan is a major producer of Chinese kiwi fruit, dried mushrooms of Jiulian, garlic, Hakka brewed liquor, Xinfengjiang pure water and mineral water, bamboo mats, sweet tangerines, green tea, and pot culture.

== Transport ==
Heyuan is served by the Hong Kong-Beijing Jingjiu railway with two stations: Heyuan railway station and Longchuan railway station.

== Attractions ==
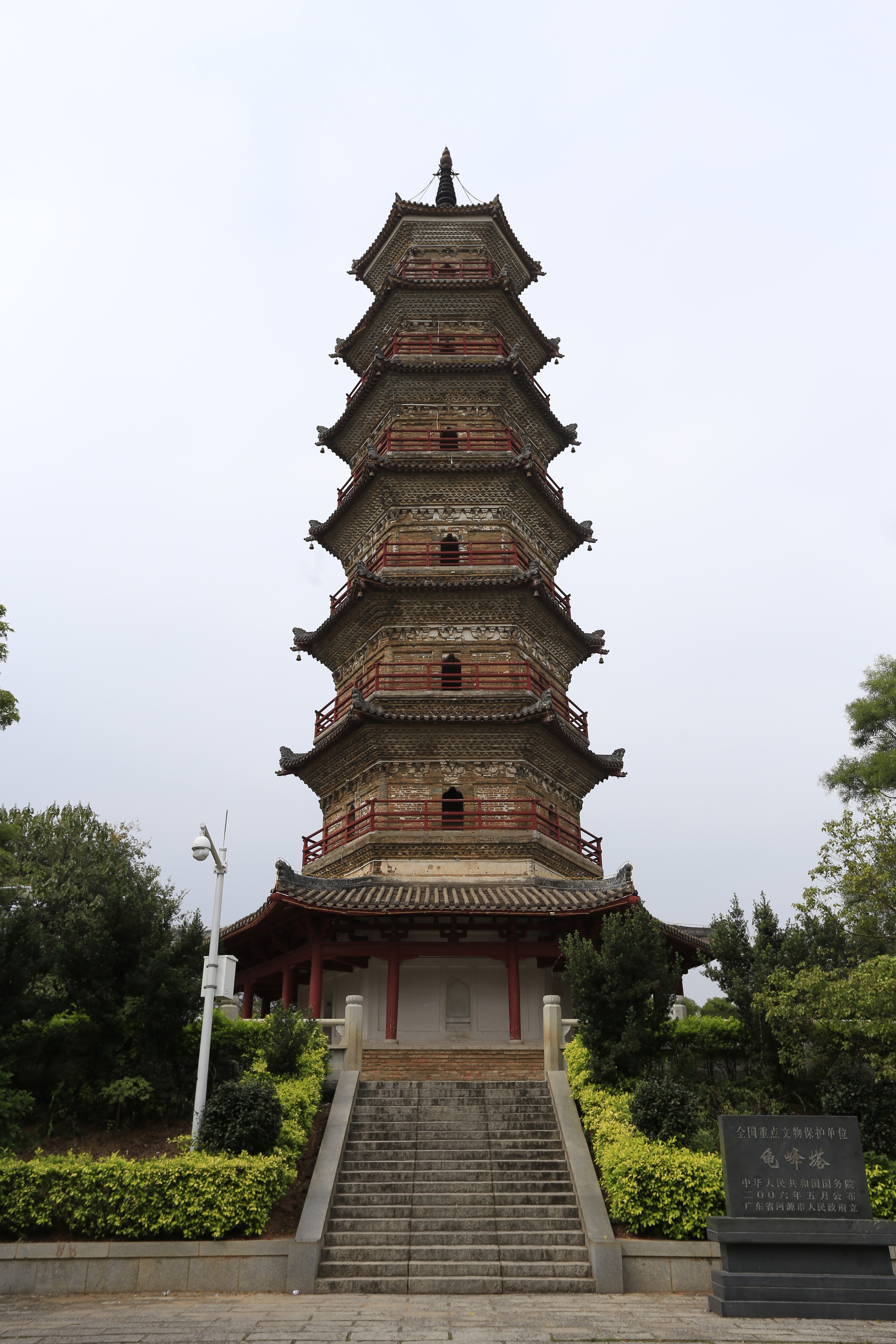
Guifeng Pagoda

=== Xinfengjiang Forest Park ===
Heyuan City has a number of tourist attractions. There is a tall fountain located in Xinfengjiang forest park. There are scenic areas such as the Dagui Mountain and the first big artificial lake; Wanlu Lake and the Sujiawei Round House.

=== Longchuan County ===
Longchuan County is home to scenic spots in Huoshan and Shuikeng.

=== Lianping ===
The Neiguan Mountains and rivers are located in Lianping county.

=== Dongyuan County ===
In Dongyuan county, there are scenic spots at Huanglong Crag and Zhangxi.

== Sister cities ==
- Kota Kinabalu, Sabah, Malaysia
- Tieling, Liaoning
