= Wuhua dialect =

Dialect of Hakka Chinese

Wuhua
- 五華話 / 五华话
- Pronunciation: [ŋ̍˧˩ fa˧˥ fa˥˩]
- Native to: Southern China, Taiwan
- Region: Wuhua
- Native speakers: (undated figure of 6,260,000)
- Language family: Sino-Tibetan: Sinitic; Chinese; Hakka; Yue-Tai; Long-Hua / Xing-Hua Section; Wuhua
- Writing system: Chinese characters Pha̍k-fa-sṳ

Language codes
- ISO 639-3: –
- Glottolog: None

Wuhua dialect
- Traditional Chinese: 五華話
- Simplified Chinese: 五华话
Transcriptions
Standard Mandarin
- Hanyu Pinyin: Wǔhuáhuà

The Wuhua dialect (simplified Chinese: 五华话; traditional Chinese: 五華話; pinyin: Wǔhuáhuà, Hakka: ŋ̍˧˩ fa˧˥ fa˥˩, Kak-ka-fa (-va), Kak-fa (-va) is a major dialect of Hakka Chinese spoken in Wuhua County, Jiexi County, Shenzhen, eastern Dongguan, Northern Guangdong around Shaoguan, Sichuan Province, and Tonggu County in Jiangxi Province.

Overall, the Wuhua dialect is very similar to the prestige dialect of Hakka, the Meixian dialect.

== Characteristics ==
The Wuhua dialect is characterized by the pronunciation of several voiced Middle Chinese qu-sheng (fourth tone) syllables of Moiyen dialect in the Shang-sheng (third tone). The tone-level of the yang-ping is a rising /13/, /35/ or /24/ instead of the low-level /11/ usually found in Meixian. In Wuhua-concentrated areas of Northern Bao'an and Eastern Dongguan, the same Meixian dialect tone level of the yang-ping is found. Two sets of fricatives and affricates (z, c, s, zh, ch, sh, s / ts’ / s, [ts], [tsh], [s] and [ts], [tsh], [s] and [tʃ ], [tʃh], [ ʃ ]) appear, similar to Mandarin Chinese. The distinctive "y" final is found in the Yuebei (Northern Guangdong) Hakka group and Sichuan group. Retroflexed initials in 知 (Zhi series) “Knowledge”, 曉/晓 (Xiao group) “Dawn”, and part of 溪 (Xi) “Brook”, and poor usage of medials in Grade III and closed finals. Wuhua dialect exhibits “latter-word” tone sandhi. Phonologically, Wuhua showcases a north–south separation while lexically depicting an east- and middle-Guangdong separation, showing similarities to inland and coastal Hakka dialects. Lexically it shows east–west separation in Wuhua, which is quite different from the phonological point of view. Outwardly, lexicons in Wuhua show that the Wuhua dialect is on the diglossia that separates east and middle Guangdong. This way, the lexicons distinguish coast-side dialects from inland ones. The Wuhua dialect is transitional, no matter how it is seen historically or geographically. Overall, the Wuhua Hakka dialect is very similar to the prestige of the Moiyen (Meixian) Hakka dialect.

In the Wuhua Hakka dialect group, Qusheng consists of only QingQu syllables, Shangsheng is a combination of Qingshang and Zhuoqu Characters.

The rounded vowel [y] is common in Yuebei and Sichuan.

According to the Hakka classification of Hashimoto Mantaro, the Wuhua accent falls into Hakka dialects with a high rising staccato and high level tone, a falling tone contour for tone 4 and a rising feature for tone 2.

== Background ==
Most varieties of Jiaying subdialect (Yue-Tai) belong to the Meixian patois, but those in northern Guangdong and Sichuan and some dialects in western Guangdong belong to the Wuhua patois, the Wuhua patoi merges Yangqu with the Shang tone instead, so that voiced characters of MC departing tones have the Shang tone, not Qu. Besides, the Meixian group has a Yingping tone value of 11, but Wuhua has the value of 35 or 24.

== Location ==
Wuhua County is located in the upper reaches of the Han River. The southeast border of the county is adjacent to Fengshun, Jiexi, and Lufeng. Heyuan and Zijin are located on the southwest borders. The northwest border is connected to Longchuan and the northeast to Xingning. Due to the resulting language contact, Wuhua is affected by the dialectal assimilation of the surrounding areas.

The Wuhua dialect can be found in Wuhua County, Jiexi County, Northern Bao'An (formerly Xin'An (Sin-On), presently called Shenzhen), and Eastern Dongguan, in Guangdong Province, It can also be observed in Yuebei or Northern Guangdong around Shaoguan, as well as in Sichuan Province, and Tonggu County in Jiangxi Province.

Taiwan is also home to the Wuhua Hakka people who migrated from South Wuhua County during the Qing dynasty. Taiwanese Wuhua has observed many changes in its initials, finals, and lexicons. As a result, it shares characteristics with the neighboring Sixian (四縣) and Hailu (海陸) Dialects. The tones remained the same. Minority languages tend to assimilate with their superiors as observed in the Wuhua dialect of Taiwan. The Changle dialect originates in its eponym, the county of Changle (now Wuhua). Currently, speakers of the Yongding and Changle dialects have left their own families. Due to this, there are fewer dialects that are used in present-day Taiwan, including but not limited to prominent Sixian and Hailu dialects.

== Internal variation and related dialects ==
The internal variation within Wuhua County is minimal and is mostly seen in the phonology. The Wuhua dialect spoken in Wuhua County is traditionally categorized into three subgroups:

- the northern subgroup, traditionally known as the Changle accent or Huacheng Dialect 華城話 / 华城话 (长乐声; 長樂聲; Chánglè shēng), represented by the dialect spoken in Huacheng; Market Towns where this Accent is spoken are Huacheng, and Qiling. [Huacheng dialect [華城話], [The water villages (Shuizhai) distributed in the county and its vicinity, that is, to the north of Anliu], distributed in the four towns of Huacheng, Xinqiao, Qiling and Shuangtou near Xingning in the north.]
- the central subgroup, traditionally known as the Xiace accent or Shuizhai Dialect 水寨話 / 水寨话 (下侧声; 下側聲; Xiàcè shēng), represented by the dialect spoken in Shuizhai; Market Towns where this Accent is spoken are Shuizhai, Hedong, Guotian, Hengbei, Zhuangshui, and Tanxia. [Shuizhai dialect [水寨話], distributed in the county seat and its vicinity, that is, Shuizhai, Daba, Hedong, Yóutián, Pingnan, Hengpi, Xikeng, Xiaodu, Guotian, Zhuanshui, Tanxia, and Changbu in the north of Anliu, Datian, Zhoujiang, Zhongxing, Wenkui [文葵], Dadu, Shuanghua and other places.]
- the southern subgroup, traditionally known as the Shangshan accent or Anliu Dialect 安流話 / 安流话 (上山声; 上山聲; Shàngshān shēng), represented by the dialect spoken in Anliu. The Hakka dialect in the south of Wuhua "Anliu Dialect" is influenced by the Hailu accent of its neighbors, so the tone is relatively hard. Market Towns where this Accent is spoken are Anliu, Zhoujiang, Shuanghua, Huayang, Meilin, Mianyang, and Longcun. [Shangshan dialect [上山聲], similar to Hakka dialects of Jiexi and Hailufeng, is distributed in Mianyang, Qiaojiang, Meilin, Huayang, Longcun, Xiāofāng, Dengshe, etc. south of Anliu. Shuizhai [水寨話] dialect and Huacheng [華城話] dialect are collectively called Xiashan dialect [下山聲/話]. The original Hakka dialect is Cantonese and Taiwanese [Yuetai] dialect Family, while Shangshan dialect belongs to Hakka dialect Zhangchao dialect Family [客家話漳潮片].]
- A western subgroup, which only includes the dialect spoken in Changbu (长布; 長布; Chángbù) 長佈話 / 长布话, may be added.
- New Wuhua speech, Due to its proximity to Xingning City, the spoken language of young people in Wuhua County has been deeply affected by the Xingning dialect, especially in northern towns. Also, due to modern schooling, and mass movement, more modern vocabulary is entering the dialect. Wuhua dialect ending consonants have changed from -m to -ng[ŋ] and from -p to -k
- Changle accent, On the Island of Taiwan, the Hakka people who use Changle accent mainly live in the area of Taozhu Miao, and a small number of them are scattered in Taipei and Taichung. Most of their ancestors are from Anliu Town and Meilin Town in Wuhua County. Features of Wuhua Dialect. Changle accent is gradually declining in Taiwan and tends to merge with the four-counties accent (Sixian accent) .

In more detailed analysis:

- In Zijin County, the Nanlu accent (南路腔; Nánlù qiāng) spoken in the towns of Longwo, as well as some villages in Shuidun Township, Nanling, Yangtou, Su District, and other villages, This Accent is similar to the Wuhua dialect due to the area's proximity to Wuhua County. The Villagers speak with a Wuhua Accent, Zijin County's Prestige accent, Zicheng's Qusheng Tone is spoken in Wuhua County's Shangsheng Tone, Related to Yuencheng, Dongyuen, Longchuan, Heping, Lianping.
- The Yuebei group; [粵北] is the most dominant dialect in the rural area of Northern Guangdong around Shaoguan. (c. 2 million speakers), The Speech spoken in Xinfeng, Qujiang and Ruyuan
- Jiexihua [揭西话; 揭西話] is spoken by the inhabitants of Jiexi County in Guangdong Province. The Hakka accent of Wuyun Town is relatively close to the Hakka accent of Wuhua County (c. 500,000 speakers)
- Dongguan Hakka [东莞话; 東莞話] is spoken by Hakka inhabitants, in the Eastern part of Dongguan County and North of Bao’an county. This accent has the Yangping as a level tone of value 11, Like Meixian Dialect. (c. 60T speakers)
- The Sichuan Hakka group or “Tu-Guangdonghua” (四川客家話; 四川客家话) is spoken by the migrants from Wuhua County, Meizhou, Guangdong to Sichuan Province (c. 1-2 million speakers)
- Tongguhua (銅鼓話; 铜鼓话) is spoken by the people in and around Tonggu County, Jiangxi Province. (c. 1 million speakers)
- The Changle accent (长乐腔; 長樂腔) was once used in Taiwan as one of the seven major Hakka accents. There are other accents such as Sixian, Hoiliuk, Yongding, Changle/Wuhua, Dabu, Raoping, and Chao'An. It was introduced to the territory by settlers from Changle County (present-day Wuhua) in Jiaying (present-day Meizhou) and immigrants from Yong'an County, Present-day Zijin County (Huizhou Prefecture). Its language is akin to the accents adjacent to the Qin River near Anliu and its surrounding area, in the south of Wuhua County located in present-day mainland China. However, in the Qu Lao Keng area in Yangmei District (specifically Taoyuan City) on Taiwan, there are still many families who utilize the Changle Accent., In Taiwan, the Hakka people who use Changle accent mainly live in the area of Taozhumiao, and a small number of them are scattered in Taipei and Taichung. Most of their ancestral homes are Anliu Town and Meilin Town in Wuhua County. They belong to the Shangshan Accent, and some of the Characteristics of earlier days are preserved. The characteristics of Wuhua dialect. Changle accent is gradually declining in Taiwan and tends to merge with the Sixian accent., "Most of the Wuhua Hakka immigrants in Taiwan came from the vicinity of Anliu. During the Qing Dynasty, they followed Hailufeng to immigrate to the Hailufeng immigration area in Taoyuan and Hsinchu. Therefore, Taiwan's Wuhua Hakka has almost integrated into Hailuke. The Changle dialect has disappeared in Taiwan."
- Other areas Related to the Wuhua Hakka Accent:

Meizhou: Fengshun,

Qingyuan: Yingde, Qingxing, Qingcheng, Lianzhou, Lianshan and Liannan,

Guangzhou: Conghua, and other places on the Pearl River Delta,

Guangxi: Hezhou (贺州), in Liantang (莲塘), Shatian (沙田), Gonghui (公会), Guiling (桂岭), Huangtian (黄田)

== Phonology ==
=== Consonant inventory ===
		Labial	Alveolar	Retroflex	Velar	Glottal
Nasal		m	n		ŋ	
Plosive	tenuis	p	t		k	
Plosive	aspirated	pʰ	tʰ		kʰ	
Affricate	tenuis		ts	tʂ		
Affricate	aspirated		tsʰ	tʂʰ		
Fricative		f v	s	ʂ		h
Approximant			l			

==== Finals ====
Most finals are the same with Meixian / Moiyen dialect, except for:

Moiyen	Wuhua
uon	on
ian	an
ian	ien
i	ui
in	un
uan	has lost the "u" medial, example: "kan"
uai	has lost the "u" medial, example: "kan"
uon	has lost the "u" medial, example: "kan"
ien	en

=== Vowel inventory ===
	Front	Central	Back
Close	i	ɨ	u
Open-mid	ɛ		ɔ
Open		a	

=== Tones ===
Wuhua tones
Tone number	Tone name	Hanzi	Tone letters	number	English
1	yin ping	陰平	˦	44	high
2	yang ping	陽平	˩	34	low
3	shang	上	˧˩	21	low falling
4	qu	去	˥˧	42	high falling
5	yin ru	陰入	˩	21	low checked
6	yang ru	陽入	˥	44	high checked

In Wuhua, Shaoguan (and most dialects around it), and Sichuan, the Yangping is usually 35 instead of 11.

== Wuhua Romanization and IPA ==
Romanization	IPA
b	[p]
p	[pʰ]
m	[m]
f	[f]
v	[v]
d	[t]
t	[tʰ]
n	[n]
l	[l]
g	[k]
k	[kʰ]
ng	[ŋ]
h	[h]
j	[ts](i)
q	[tsʰ](i)
x	[s](i)
z*	[ts]
c*	[tsʰ]
s*	[s]
zh*	[tʂ]
ch*	[tʂʰ]
sh*	[ʂ]
a	[a]
o	[ɔ]
i	[i]
u	[u]
ê	[ɛ]
e	[ɨ]

Romanization with an asterisk (*) always precedes an [i].
