= Wuhua County =

Wuhua 五华县
- County
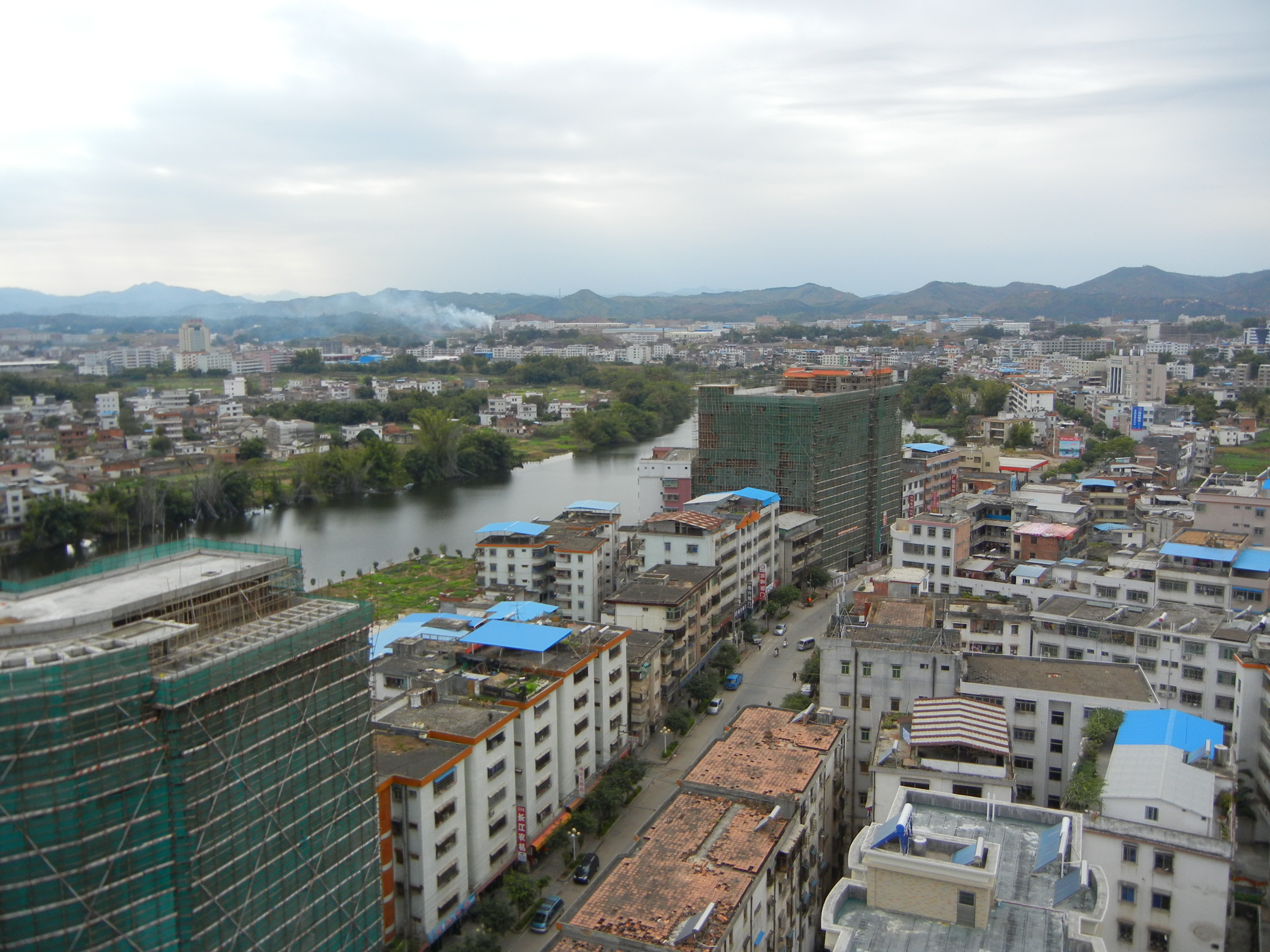

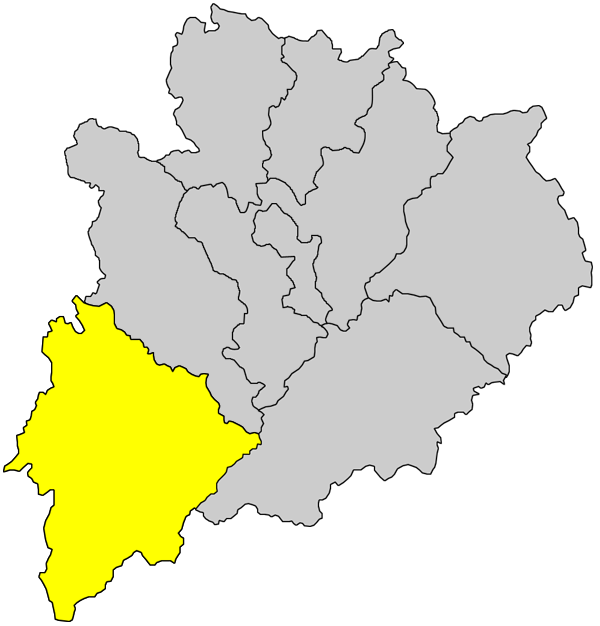
- Wuhua in Meizhou

- Meizhou in Guangdong
- Coordinates: 23°46′N 115°42′E
- Country: People's Republic of China
- Province: Guangdong
- Prefecture-level city: Meizhou

Area
  - Total: 3,226 km^{2} (1,246 sq mi)

Population (2020 census)
  - Total: 916,961
  - Density: 284.2/km^{2} (736.2/sq mi)
- Time zone: UTC+8 (China Standard)

Wuhua County
- Traditional Chinese: 五華縣
- Simplified Chinese: 五华县
Transcriptions
Standard Mandarin
- Hanyu Pinyin: Wǔhuá Xiàn
- Bopomofo: ㄨˇ ㄏㄨㄚˊ
- Wade–Giles: Wu^{3}-hua^{2} Hsien^{4}
Hakka
- Pha̍k-fa-sṳ: Ńg-fà Yen
Yue: Cantonese
- Yale Romanization: Ńghwàh Yuhn
- Jyutping: Ng^{5} Waa^{4} Jyun^{6}
Southern Min
- Hokkien POJ: Gō͘-hôa Koān
- Tâi-lô: Gōo-huâ Kuān

Wuhua County (simplified Chinese: 五华县; traditional Chinese: 五華縣; pinyin: Wǔhuá Xiàn, Hakka: Ng-Fa Yen), formerly known as Changle County (長樂縣), adopted its present name in the early Republic of China period. It is under the jurisdiction of the prefecture-level city of Meizhou City in Guangdong Province and covers a total area of 3,237.8 square kilometers.

Located in eastern Guangdong and in the upper reaches of the Han River, it borders Fengshun County of Meizhou to the east; Jiexi County of Jieyang and Lufeng City of Shanwei to the south; Zijin County, Dongyuan County, and Longchuan County of Heyuan to the west; and Xingning City of Meizhou to the north.

== Names ==
When people speak of Wuhua County in Meizhou, many still recall its old name, Changle County (長樂縣), a name said to originate from the story that Zhao Tuo (趙佗), King of Nanyue (南越王), was enfeoffed in this region and built the "Changle Terrace" (長樂台) there. Tracing the timeline back across the centuries: Changle County was established in 1071, developing in close connection with Xingning, Longchuan, and Zijin. In the eleventh year of the Yongzheng Emperor's reign (1733 AD), it was transferred to Jiaying Prefecture (嘉應直隸州). In the third year of Republic of China (民國三年, 1914 AD), to avoid having the same name as Changle County in Fujian Province, it was renamed Wuhua, after Wuhua Mountain, which was located north of the old county town.

== Administrative divisions ==
The county is responsible for the administration of 16 towns with the seat of government located in Shuizhai (水寨镇).

- Zhuanshui (转水镇)
- Tanxia (潭下镇)
- Guotian (郭田镇)
- Shuanghua (双华镇)
- Meilin (梅林镇)
- Huayang (华阳镇)
- Huacheng (华城镇)
- Zhoujiang (周江镇)
- Shuizhai (水寨镇)
- Hedong (河东镇)
- Qiling (岐岭镇)
- Changbu (长布镇)
- Hengbei (横陂镇)
- Anliu (安流镇)
- Mianyang (棉洋镇)
- Longcun (龙村镇)

== Climate ==
Climate data for Wuhua, elevation 136 m (446 ft), (1991–2020 normals, extremes 1981–2010)
Month	Jan	Feb	Mar	Apr	May	Jun	Jul	Aug	Sep	Oct	Nov	Dec	Year
Record high °C (°F)	29.4 (84.9)	32.2 (90.0)	33.3 (91.9)	35.1 (95.2)	36.1 (97.0)	38.0 (100.4)	38.6 (101.5)	38.4 (101.1)	37.2 (99.0)	35.2 (95.4)	34.0 (93.2)	29.9 (85.8)	38.6 (101.5)
Mean daily maximum °C (°F)	17.9 (64.2)	19.8 (67.6)	22.6 (72.7)	26.7 (80.1)	29.9 (85.8)	32.0 (89.6)	33.8 (92.8)	33.3 (91.9)	31.8 (89.2)	28.8 (83.8)	24.6 (76.3)	19.4 (66.9)	26.7 (80.1)
Daily mean °C (°F)	12.5 (54.5)	14.6 (58.3)	17.7 (63.9)	22.0 (71.6)	25.3 (77.5)	27.4 (81.3)	28.7 (83.7)	28.2 (82.8)	26.9 (80.4)	23.6 (74.5)	19.0 (66.2)	13.9 (57.0)	21.6 (71.0)
Mean daily minimum °C (°F)	8.8 (47.8)	11.0 (51.8)	14.2 (57.6)	18.5 (65.3)	22.0 (71.6)	24.3 (75.7)	25.2 (77.4)	24.9 (76.8)	23.4 (74.1)	19.6 (67.3)	15.0 (59.0)	10.0 (50.0)	18.1 (64.5)
Record low °C (°F)	−1.2 (29.8)	1.3 (34.3)	1.4 (34.5)	7.8 (46.0)	12.9 (55.2)	17.4 (63.3)	19.5 (67.1)	21.6 (70.9)	15.2 (59.4)	8.1 (46.6)	3.3 (37.9)	−2.5 (27.5)	−2.5 (27.5)
Average precipitation mm (inches)	51.8 (2.04)	66.4 (2.61)	135.8 (5.35)	171.4 (6.75)	189.5 (7.46)	249.7 (9.83)	173.6 (6.83)	197.0 (7.76)	136.6 (5.38)	40.4 (1.59)	37.2 (1.46)	44.2 (1.74)	1,493.6 (58.8)
Average precipitation days (≥ 0.1 mm)	7.3	10.0	14.1	14.5	17.4	18.4	15.0	16.8	11.9	4.9	5.4	6.1	141.8
Average snowy days	0.1	0	0	0	0	0	0	0	0	0	0	0	0.1
Average relative humidity (%)	74	76	78	78	79	81	76	79	77	71	72	72	76
Mean monthly sunshine hours	129.8	106.5	103.0	114.0	139.7	162.6	217.3	192.4	183.3	186.7	163.6	149.3	1,848.2
Percentage possible sunshine	39	33	28	30	34	40	52	48	50	52	50	45	42
Source: China Meteorological Administration

== Sports ==
Chinese Super League club Meizhou Hakka play in Wuhua County, at the Huitang Stadium in the Wuhua County Olympic Sports Centre complex.

== Education ==
- Shuizhai High School

== See also ==
- List of township-level divisions of Guangdong
- Wuhua dialect
