= Meiling =

Meiling or Mei Ling may refer to:

== Industry ==
- Hefei Meiling, Chinese home appliance manufacturer

== Places in China ==
- Meiling Mountains, the former name of the Dayu Mountains, a mountain range in China
- Meiling, Zhao'an County, a town in Zhao'an County, Fujian
- Meiling, Jiangxi, a town in Nanchang, Jiangxi
- Meiling Subdistrict, Jinjiang, a subdistrict of Jinjiang, Fujian
- Meiling Subdistrict, Yangzhou, a subdistrict of Hanjiang District, Yangzhou, Jiangsu

== Names ==
- Meiling (given name), a feminine Chinese given name
- Connie Meiling (born 1930), Danish child actress of the 1930s
- Marc Meiling (born 1962), German judoka
- Hong Meiling, Touhou Project character

== See also ==
- Meilin (disambiguation)
- Melling (disambiguation)
