= MEI =

MEI may refer to:

== Education ==
- MEI Academy, an international school
- Mathematics in Education and Industry, an examination board affiliated with the OCR examination board
- Mennonite Educational Institute, an independent grades K-12 school in Abbotsford, British Columbia

== Businesses ==
- MEI (company), a manufacturer of cash handling systems
- Matsushita Electric Industrial Co., Ltd.
- Member of the Energy Institute (MEI)
- Meeting delle etichette indipendenti, an annual conference of Italian independent record labels

== Government ==
- Ministry of Economy and Innovation (Portuguese: Ministério da Economia e Inovação), the Portuguese economy ministry
- Middle East Institute
- Marginal efficiency of investment, or internal rate of return, a relationship between interest rate and amount of investment that can be profitable at a given time
- Montreal Economic Institute
- Medicare Economic Index
- Meridian Regional Airport (IATA code: MEI)
- Meridian Multi-Modal Transportation Center (Amtrak code: MEI)

== Military ==
- MEI Hellhound (Grenade), a low-velocity multipurpose grenade
- MEI Mercury, a family of grenades developed by Martin Electronics, Inc.

== Science ==
- Multivariate ENSO index
- 4-Methylimidazole (4-MEI), a chemical compound

== Technology ==
- Management Engine Interface, a component of Intel Active Management Technology
- Music Encoding Initiative, a music encoding format

== Other uses ==
- Middle East International, a bimonthly magazine published in London from 1971 until 2005
- Media and Entertainment International, a former global union federation
- OECD Main Economic Indicators, a monthly publication of the Organisation for Economic Co-operation and Development
- Merit, excellence, and intelligence, a framework that emphasizes selecting candidates based solely on their merit, achievements, skills, abilities, intelligence and contributions

== See also ==
- Mei (disambiguation)
