= Mei =

Mei or mei may refer to:

== Arts and entertainment ==
- Mei (film), a 2019 Indian Tamil-language medical thriller film
- Mei (album), a 2002 album by Echolyn

== People ==
- Mei (surname), a list of people with the surname
- Mei (given name), a list of people and fictional characters with the given name
- Roger Meï, a French politician (1935–2025)

== Places ==
- Mei County, Shaanxi, China
- Mei County, Guangdong, China
- Mei Pass, Guangdong, China
- Mei River, Guangdong, China
- Eiras e Mei, a civil parish of Arcos de Valdevez, Portugal

== Other uses ==
- Mei (dinosaur), a genus of bird-like Chinese dinosaur
- Methyl iodide, or MeI, a chemical compound
- Prunus mume, or mei, a Chinese plum
- Meilin "Mei" Lee, a main protagonist from a 2022 American animated film Turning Red
- Mei-chan, a pet name of Tadakuni's younger sister in Daily Lives of High School Boys
- Mei, the month May in several Indonesian local languages, including Malay, Indonesian, Javanese, Balinese, Sundanese, and Hulontalo
- Midob language (ISO 639-3 code: mei)

== See also ==
- Persian wine, or May
- MEI (disambiguation)
- Mei Mei (disambiguation)
- Mei Lin (disambiguation)
