= Changbu =

Changbu may refer to these towns in China:

- Changbu, Guangdong (长布), in Wuhua County, Guangdong
- Changbu, Jiangxi (长埠), in Anyi County, Jiangxi
