= Meilin =

Meilin may refer to:

== People ==
- Gada Meilin (1892–1931), or Gada Meiren, Inner Mongolian leader
- Han Meilin (born 1936), Chinese artist
- Ong Mei Lin, Malaysian swimmer who competed at the 1972 Summer Olympics
- Shi Meilin (fl. 1970s), Chinese tai chi practitioner
- Meilin Gray (born 1989), American singer based in Beijing
- Meilin Miranda, pen name of American writer Lynn Siprelle

== Fictional characters ==
- Meilin Li (or Meilin Rae), a supporting character from the anime Cardcaptor Sakura
- Mei Lin Barnes, a character from the animated TV series Arthur
- Mey-Rin (or Meilin), a character from the manga and anime series Black Butler
- Meilin "Mei" Lee, the main character from the 2022 Disney-Pixar film Turning Red

== Places ==
- Meilin Line, a line of the Shenzhen Metro, China
- Meilin, Gan County (梅林镇), a town in Jiangxi, China
- Meilin, Fengcheng, Jiangxi (梅林镇), a town in Fengcheng, Jiangxi, China
- Meilin, Wuhua County, a town in Guangdong Province, China

== See also ==
- Meiling (disambiguation)
- Mei Lin (disambiguation)
