= Meiling (given name) =

Meiling, also spelled Mei Ling, Mei-ling or May-ling, is a feminine Chinese given name. According to Taiwan's 2010 census, it was the third most popular name for women, with 27,914 having the name.

== People ==
- Chen Mei-ling (born 1958), Republic of China politician
- Guo Meiling or Guo Meimei (born 1991), Chinese internet celebrity
- Hou Meiling or Melek Hu (born 1989), Chinese-born Turkish table tennis player
- Meiling Jin (born 1956), Guyanese author
- Mei-Ling Lam (born 1984), Playboy Playmate of the Month for June 2011
- Meiling Melançon (born 1980), American television and film actress
- Mayling Ng, actress
- Soong Mei-ling (1898–2003), wife of Republic of China President Chiang Kai-shek
- May Ling Su, pornographic actress
- Mei Ling Young, Malaysian social scientist
- Yung Mei Ling or Barbara Yung (1959–1985), Hong Kong television actress
- Mei-Ling Tse, the Chinese name for Cynthia Tse Kimberlin, American ethnomusicologist

== Fictional characters ==
- Hong Meiling, a character in Embodiment of Scarlet Devil from the game series Touhou Project
- Mei ling Hwa Darling, a supporting character from the TV series Dirty Sexy Money
- Mei Ling, a character in the video game series Metal Gear
- Mei-Ling, a twin sister character that had merged with Hsien-Ko in the Darkstalkers video game series
- Meiling Li, a supporting character from the Cardcaptor Sakura anime
- May-Ling Shen, a character from the Highlander franchise
- Mei-Ling Zhou, known in-game as Mei, a character from the video game Overwatch
- Mei Ling, a character from the 1973 film Enter the Dragon, played by Betty Chung
- Chin Mei-ling, the main character from the book An Ocean Apart from the Dear Canada book series

== See also ==
- Meilin (disambiguation)
- Meiling (disambiguation), for locations and people using as surname
