= Mei Mei =

Mei Mei (Chinese: 妹妹 or 美美) is a feminine nickname of Chinese origin, meaning "younger sister".

Mei Mei, MeiMei, Mei-Mei, Meimei, or Mei-mei may also refer to:

== People ==
- Mei-mei Berssenbrugge (b. 1947), American poet
- MeiMei Kuo (b. 1985), Taiwanese actress
- Guo Meimei (b. 1991), Chinese internet celebrity

== Entertainment ==
=== Film and television ===
- Mei Mei, a 2009 Chinese-American short film
- Apple in Your Eye, a 2014 Taiwanese television series
- Mei Mei, a main protagonist from a 2010 American film Little Sister
- Mei Mei, a main protagonist from a 2011 Australian film 33 Postcards
- "Mei Mei", a second episode of fifth season of an American television series Hell on Wheels
- Simon calls River "Mei Mei" in the 2002 english television drama Firefly

=== Novel ===
- Mei Mei, the name of a giant panda appeared in a 2004 American novel Chinese Cinderella and the Secret Dragon Society
- Mei Mei, a supporting character from a 2006 Indonesian novel Sang Pemimpi
- Meimei (メイメイ), a supporting character from a Japanese light novel Hundred
- Meimei (梅梅), a supporting character from a Japanese light novel The Apothecary Diaries

=== Comic ===
- Mei Mei (メイメイ), a supporting character from a Japanese manga Polar Bear Café
- Mei Mei (冥 冥), a supporting character from a Japanese manga Jujutsu Kaisen
- Mei Mei, a supporting character from a Japanese manga Tokyo Aliens
- Mei-Mei (梅梅), a supporting character from a Japanese manga Nagasarete Airantō
- Meimei (苺苺), a supporting character from Japanese manga series Seton Academy: Join the Pack!

=== Animation ===
- Mei Mei, a supporting character from an American animated series Happily Ever After: Fairy Tales for Every Child
- Mei-Mei (メイメイ), a supporting character from Japanese anime series adaptation of manga Beyblade: Metal Fusion
- Mei-Mei Xiang, a supporting character from a 2020 Japanese anime Sword Art Online: Alicization – War of Underworld: Part II
- Xiao Mei Mei, a supporting character from a Malaysian animated series Upin & Ipin

=== Video game ===
- Mei Mei (美美), a non-playable character from the Japanese video game Kessen II

=== Music ===
- "Mei Mei – Dream All The Time" (Mei Mei いつでも夢を, Mei Mei Itsudemo Yume Wo), an album by Agnes Chan (1976)
  - "美美 (Mei Mei)", a song in that album
- 霉霉 (Meimei) - A Chinese nickname for singer Taylor Swift - Meimei 霉霉 in Chinese also means "Unlucky"
- Mei Mei – a Filipino girl group

== Place ==
- Mei Mei, a coffee shop located at Borough Market in London, United Kingdom
- Meimei-an (明々庵), a tea house located in Matsue, Japan

== See also ==
- Mei
- Mei Lin
- Little Sister (disambiguation), 小妹妹 (Xiǎo Mèimei) lit. 'Little Sister' in Chinese.
