= Anyi =

Anyi may refer to:

- Anyin language, spoken principally in Côte d'Ivoire and in Ghana
- Anyi people
- Anyi County, in Nanchang, Jiangxi, China
- Wang Anyi
- A capital of the Xia dynasty
