= Shuanghua, Wuhua County =

Town in Guangdong, China

Coordinates: 23.7306°N 115.8180°E

- Simplified Chinese: 双华镇
Transcriptions
Standard Mandarin
- Hanyu Pinyin: Shuānghuá Zhèn

Shuanghua is a town under the jurisdiction of Wuhua County, Meizhou City, Guangdong Province, southern China.

Located on the southeast of Wuhua County and adjacent to Jiexi and Fengshun county, Shuanghua town is 28 km from the county town (Shuizhai town) with an area of 141 square kilometers. Under the control of Shuanghua town, there are 16 village committees, 221 groups of villagers and 1 community's neighborhood committee. Till the end of 2008, there were about 5984 families, 34,827 people in total in Shuanghua town, among which there were 1847 nonagricultural populations and 32890 agricultural populations. The farmland area is about 14772 mu (a Chinese unit of area, per mu is equal to 0.0667 hectares), including 11192 mu of paddy field and 3402 mu of dry land.

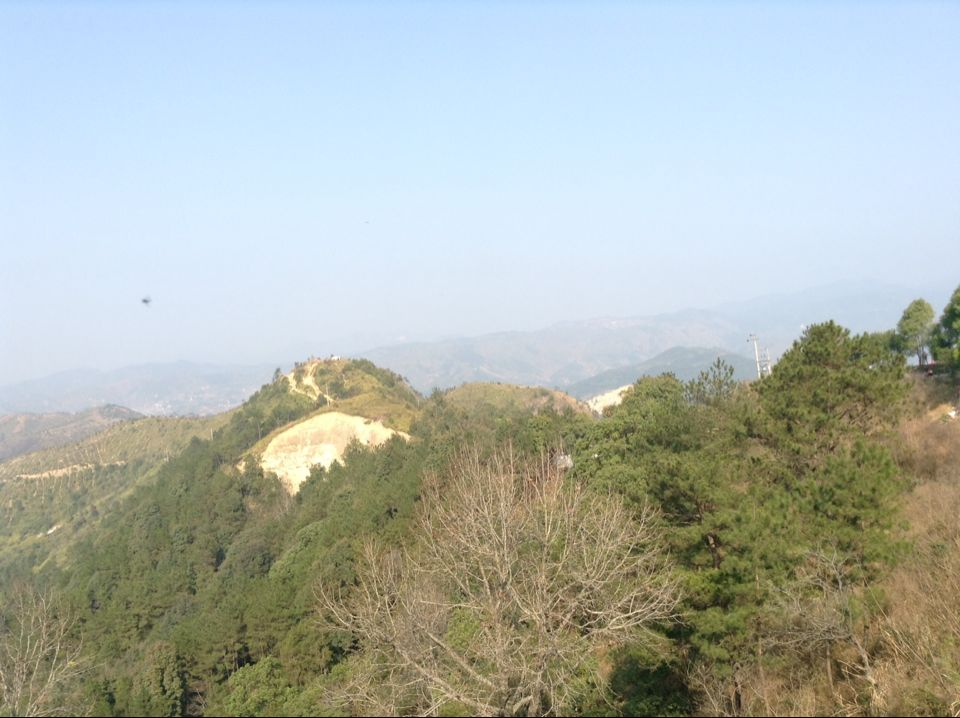
Shuanghua town

== History ==
Shuanghua town, located in Wuhua County, Guangdong province, was an old revolutionary base area, which was used as important activities by revolutionist Gu Dacun. In the Suqu village of Shuanghua, a soviet government was ever established by He Tianshui. During the National Revolution, old revolutionaries such as Zhang Jianzhen and Wan Dalai, had contributed a lot to the establishment of the red political power. Later, 145 martyrs including Chen Zuobing, Zhang Zhongrong and Deng Jieyou in this town sacrificed their lives for the Foundation of New China. To memorize the old revolutionary martyrs, a Memorial Hall capable of holding 1500 people was built in 1958 in Shuanghua town.

== Geography ==
Within the boundary of the town, there are three main rivers: the Shuanghua river, the Huaba river and the Dajing river, all of which belong to the Qinjiang river system. With a big mountainous area and broad water channel, Shuanghua receives an annual rainfall of 1600 millimeters, and its annual average temperature is 18 °C. Moreover, the annual sunshine duration of Shuanghua town is 1700 hours. Since the town has rich water resources, its potential water power reaches 7800 kilowatt, of which 5200 kilowatt has been developed, leaving 2600 kilowatt to be exploited.

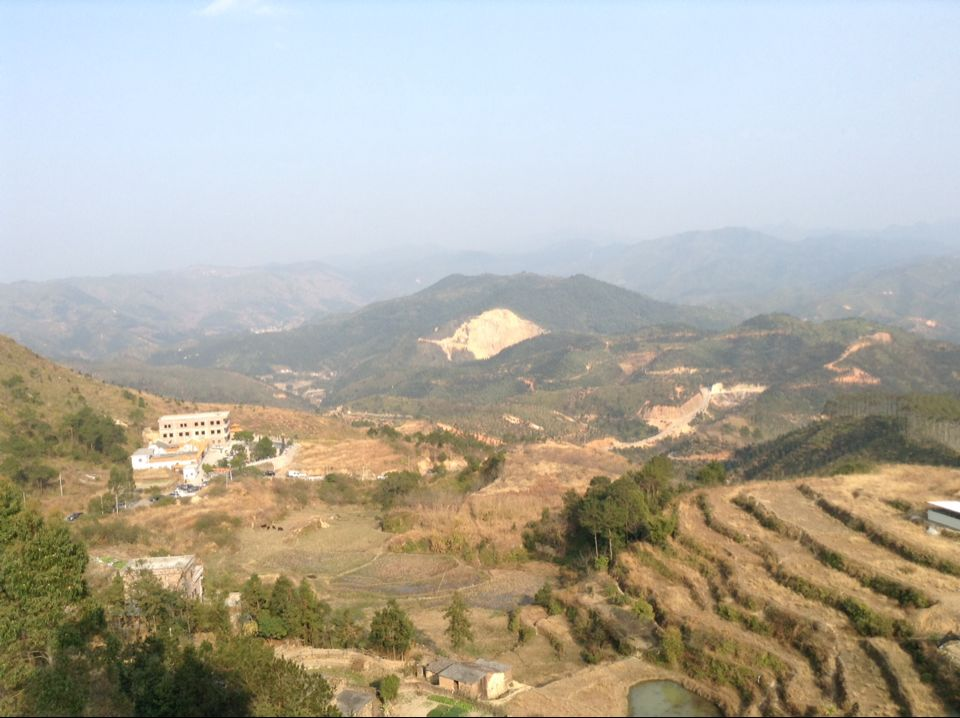
Gaoshan Zai

== Economy ==
The main soil in Shuanghua is red soil, which provides a fertile soil layer for Radix Morindae Officinalis (Morinda root), Castanea mollissima (Chinese chestnut), pear and tea to grow. Furthermore, Shuanghua also has a big reserve of tungsten, iron, tin and potassium feldspar, all of which are in high quality and have high exploration value. In 2008, the gross output value of industry and agriculture in Shuanghua town was 159 million, with an increase of 5% over last year. The per-capita annual income of rural residents was 3325rmb with an increase of 5% compared to that of 2007. High quality rice plants area of the town was about 23,000 mu in 2008, sharing 98% of the town's rice farms. The grain total output in 2008 was 11 thousand tons with an increase of 1.9%. Till now, the newly planted Castanea mollissima is over 1000 mu, and the total Chinese chestnut plant area in the town is 3600 mu, which results in an increase of 2,200,000 rmb of farmer's income per year. Many villages such as Dabei, Fumei and Hushi village are now planting tobacco, which can realize out value of about 530,000 rmb per year on average. Besides of planting, Shuanghua also spares no effort to explore other ways of development. Tiantang morinda wine factory, built in 1986 and stopped production in 1999 because of the financial matter, has resumed to production in recent years, which plays an important role in the town's economic development. Moreover, Shuagnhua has a big reserves of potassium feldspar which has a high purity and quality and is the critical raw material of ceramic.

== Scenic spots ==
There are many scenic spots such as Tiantang mountain, Baiyun temple, Yinglie temple and Huiyun temple. In recent years, new tourist attractions such as solar tower, Shuanghua history building and Tiantang mountain agricultural tourism zone have been built to attract more tourists. Being an old revolutionary area, Shuanghua, together with Pingnan town, has developed a special red tourism.

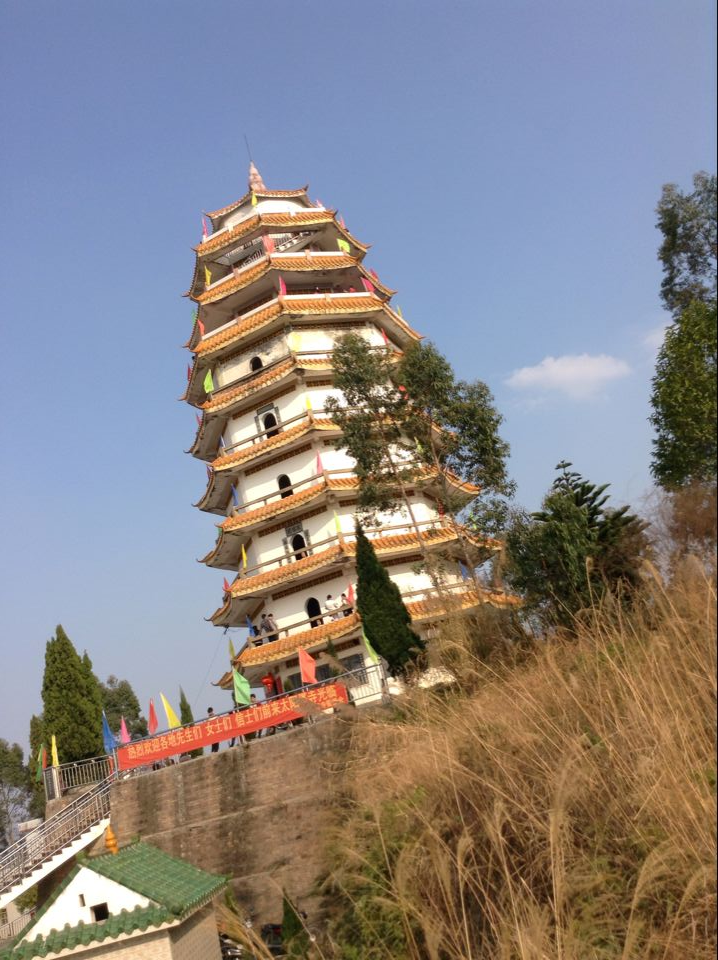
Solar Tower

== Education & Culture ==
In Shuanghua town, there are 1 junior high school and 17 primary schools. In 2008, more than 2,000,000rmb had been put into education to help with activities of respecting teachers and their teaching as well as scholarship in those schools. As a result, the teaching quality of middle and primary schools has been greatly improved. In 2008, 25,334 people took part in the rural cooperative medical insurance, and 631 people took part in the urban residents' basic medical insurance. 980 people were enrolled in medical claim system, and the medical aid reached 1,230,000 rmb. In order to implement family planning policy, Shuanghua pays much attention to birth control and frequently gives birth guidance for people.
