= Mianyang (disambiguation) =

Mianyang (绵阳) is a prefecture-level city in Sichuan, China.

Mianyang may also refer to the following locations in China:

- Mianyang, Guangdong (棉洋), a town in Wuhua County, Guangdong
- Mianyang Subdistrict (勉阳街道), a subdistrict in Mian County, Shaanxi
- Xiantao, a city in Hubei, known as Mianyang (沔阳) before 1986
- Mianyang Prefecture (沔阳府), a prefecture in imperial China, including Honghu, Tianmen and Xiantao
