= Xiong Shihui =

Chinese general (1893–1974)

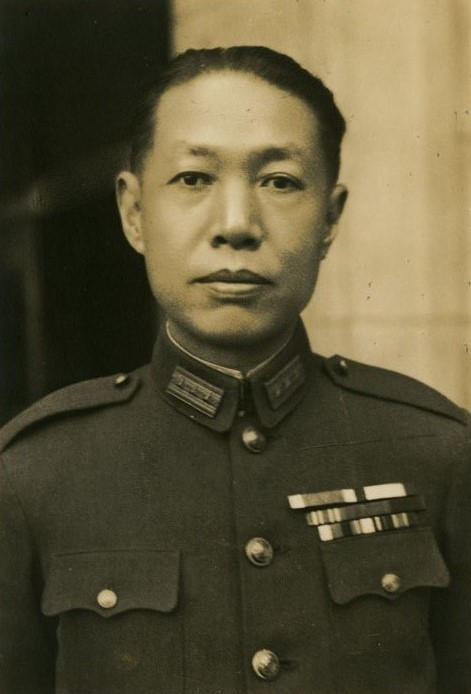

Chairman of the Northeast Headquarters
- In office 1 September 1945 – 29 August 1947
- Succeeded by: Chen Cheng

Chairman of Jiangxi Provincial Government
- In office 15 December 1931 – 25 February 1942
- Preceded by: Lu Diping
- Succeeded by: Cao Haosen

Personal details
- Born: 19 May 1893 Anyi County, Jiangxi, Qing dynasty
- Died: 21 January 1974 (aged 80) Taichung, Taiwan
- Party: Kuomintang
- Awards: Order of Blue Sky and White Sun

Military service
- Allegiance: Republic of China
- Branch/service: (Republic of China (1912–1949)) National Revolutionary Army
- Years of service: 1915–1974
- Battles/wars: Constitutional Protection Movement; Northern Expedition; Central Plains War; Second Sino-Japanese War; Chinese Civil War

Xiong Shihui (19 May 1893 – 21 January 1974), also known by his courtesy name Tianyi, was a Republic of China general. He was a native of Anyi County, Jiangxi. He was a key figure in the Political Science Department of the Nationalist Government and was in charge of Northeast China during the Chinese Civil War.

== Biography ==
Shihui graduated from the second phase of Baoding Military Academy in 1915. In 1921, he went to Japan Army University and graduated in 1924. After returning to China and Guangdong, he served as the director of education at the Guangzhou Yunnan Army Cadre School.

In the summer of 1926, during the Northern Expedition, he served as the party representative of the 14th Army of the National Revolutionary Army. In October, he also served as the commander of the First Division. In February 1927, he served as Accountant General of the Jiangxi Provincial Government Government Affairs Committee. In 1928, he was appointed commander of the Fifth Army Division, and in September 1928, he was appointed as the garrison commander of Songhu. In May 1930, he concurrently served as the commander-in-chief of the bandit suppression in Jiangsu, Zhejiang and Anhui provinces and as the chief of staff of the Army and Navy Headquarters. In June 1931, he was transferred to Nanchang Camp Chief of Staff.

On 15 December 1931, Chiang Kai-shek held the 49th State Council meeting and appointed Xiong Shihui as Chairman of the Jiangxi Provincial Government. In May 1933, he concurrently served as director of the Nanchang Business Office. In October 1935, he was elected as the fifth Central Executive Committee member of the Chinese Kuomintang. During Xiong Shihui's rule in Jiangxi, he promoted Nanchang's municipal construction and built Lakeside Park, Lingying Bridge, Zhuangyuan Bridge, Zhongzheng Bridge (1936), Hongdu Guesthouse; as well as Yangming Road, Xiangshan Road, Dieshan Road, Minde, Chuanshan Road, Yongming Road, etc. More than 120 kinds of exorbitant taxes and miscellaneous taxes have been abolished on major roads such as Shu Road, Zigu Road, and Rongmen Road.

On September 22, 1937, he was awarded the rank of lieutenant general and general. At that time, he served as director of the General Office of the Nanchang Headquarters and director of the Jiangxi Provincial Military Control District.

In 1940, he founded National Chung Cheng University and hired the famous Jiangxi scientist Hu Xiansuan as president.

After the Ninth Plenary Session of the Fifth Central Committee of the Kuomintang at the end of 1941, he was promoted to the Central Committee and served as a member of the Supreme National Defense Committee. On March 18, 1942, he served as the "Head of the Chinese Military Delegation" and visited Britain and the United States. It was proposed to the U.S. government that if the Allies abolished the unequal treaty with China, it would help improve the country's status, restore national self-esteem, and make a national contribution. Returned to China on April 15, 1943. In the autumn of 1943, he was appointed director of the Central Design Bureau, and in 1944, he was appointed supervisor of the Central Bank of the Republic of China. In May 1945, he served as a member of the Sixth Central Executive Committee of the Chinese Kuomintang.

On 5 August 1945, he flew to Moscow with Song Ziwen and Wang Shijie and signed the Sino-Soviet Treaty of Friendship and Alliance. Returned to China on August 21 to prepare for the Northeast Camp. In September, he served as director of the Northeast Camp of the Chairman of the National Government Military Commission (renamed the Northeast Camp of the Chairman of the National Government in June 1946) and chairman of the Political Committee of the Northeast Camp, in charge of all military and political affairs in the Northeast. On 12 October, he flew from Chongqing to Changchun. On the afternoon of 13 October, they met for the first time with Marshal Malinovsky of the Soviet Army and others; the second meeting was held on 17 October; the third meeting was held on 29 October; and the fourth meeting was held on 5 November. On 15 November, the Ministry of Foreign Affairs of the Nationalist Government notified the Soviet Embassy that due to obstacles in transporting troops to the Northeast, the Chinese government decided to move the Northeast camp from Changchun to Shanhaiguan. On 17 November, all personnel from the Northeast Camp and various provinces and cities were evacuated to Peiping.

At the Second Plenary Session of the Sixth Central Committee of the Kuomintang from February to March 1946, the Kuomintang came under fierce attack over the issue of taking over Northeast China. Chiang Kai-shek decided to shift from a diplomatic resolution to military operations in Manchuria. After annihilating a reinforced regiment in the battle of Xiushuihezi on 14 February, Du Yuming felt deeply that it was impossible for the national army to take over the Northeast with two armies. He made a hasty decision and took a special plane to Peking for medical treatment on the 18th. Chiang Kai-shek appointed Zheng Dongguo as deputy commander-in-chief of the Northeast Security Command to act as acting chief. On 5 March, Xiong Shihui returned to Northeast China. On 5 April, the Northeast Camp moved from Jinzhou to Shenyang. On 6 April, Chiang Kai-shek issued four warrants in one day requiring Xiong Shihui to capture Siping within a time limit. On 7 April, Xiong Shihui personally commanded two divisions from Liaoyang and Fushun to attack Benxi, resulting in heavy casualties. On 16 April, Xiong Shihui personally commanded the army to fight in Dawa and Jinshanbao southwest of Siping Street. The 87th Division of the 71st Army was wiped out. On 28 April, Du Yuming returned to Northeast China and resumed command.

In January 1947, he concurrently served as a member of the Strategic Advisory Committee of the National Government. In February 1947, he was promoted to the rank of second-level general. On May 20, Xiong Shihui, director of the Northeast Army, reported to Chiang Kai-shek the situation of the Northeast War and requested immediate reinforcements; Chiang ordered the troops to stand firm in Changchun, Yongji, and Shenyang to await reinforcements. On May 22, Chiang Kai-shek sent a telegram to Xiong Shihui, director of the Northeast Branch, to defend the Siping Street strategy. On May 30, Jiang Fei visited Shenyang for inspection, met with Xiong Shihui, listened to reports on the military, political, and economic conditions in Northeast China, and gave instructions on the battle plan. On June 15, Chiang Ching-kuo, the former Northeastern diplomatic commissioner, flew to Shenyang and paid a visit to report on the war situation in Northeast China that night. On the same day, Chiang Ching-kuo flew to Siping, Gongzhuling and other places to inspect. On August 5, Chiang Kai-shek called Xiong Shihui, director of the Northeast Operations Office, and told him the reasons why the Northeast must be protected. On August 29, the Nationalist Government ordered the removal of Xiong Shihui, director of the Northeast Operations Office, from his post; Chen Cheng was appointed as the director of the Northeast Operations Office. On September 1, Chen Cheng, the new director of Northeast China, arrived in Shenyang from Nanjing; on September 5, Xiong Shihui left Shenyang.

In 1949, he lived in Hong Kong and Macau and ran a textile factory in Bangkok. In 1954, he went to Taiwan and had occasional contact with Sun Li-jen, who was under house arrest at the time. He died of illness in Taichung in 1974.

== Family ==
Xiong Shihui married four wives in his life. Yuan Pei Dai, a native of Anyi. The second wife, Gu Zhujun, was the most favored, and she and Soong Meiling were called "sisters in exchange of posts". The third wife, Mrs. Zhang, is from Jiujiang. The fourth wife, Gu Baijun, is the younger sister of the second wife, Gu Zhujun.

== Evaluation ==
Xiong Shihui governed Jiangxi for ten years from 1931 to 1941 and made great contributions to the modernization of Jiangxi.

After the victory of the Second Sino-Japanese War, the failure to take over the Northeast affected the overall situation. It is generally believed that Xiong Shihui should bear the greatest responsibility. After Xiong Shihui was appointed as the director of the Northeast Operations, he immediately suggested that the government change the three northeastern provinces into nine provinces. He installed cronies every day, was corrupt and perverted the law, and repeatedly delayed the reception time, ignoring the growing power of the Chinese Communist Party. On the other hand, after Lin Biao arrived in Harbin, he immediately incorporated the Manchukuo troops and received the arms of the 700,000 Kwantung Army handed over by the Soviet Union and liberated from Japan. His power expanded rapidly, growing into an army of one million in just one year. The situation in Northeast China deteriorated rapidly.

== Sources ==
- 张宪文、方庆秋、黄美真主编：《中华民国史大辞典》，江苏古籍出版社。
