= Hellhound (disambiguation) =

In mythology, a hellhound is a demonic dog.

Hellhound may also mean:

- Hellhound (comics), a DC Comics character
- Hellhound Records, a German doom metal record label
- Hellhound, a series of poster booklets in the Galgrease manga series
- MEI HELLHOUND, a high-explosive 40mm round fired by the Milkor MGL grenade launcher
- Hellhounds (film), a 2009 Canadian horror film
