= Dong River (China) =

Tributary of the Pearl River

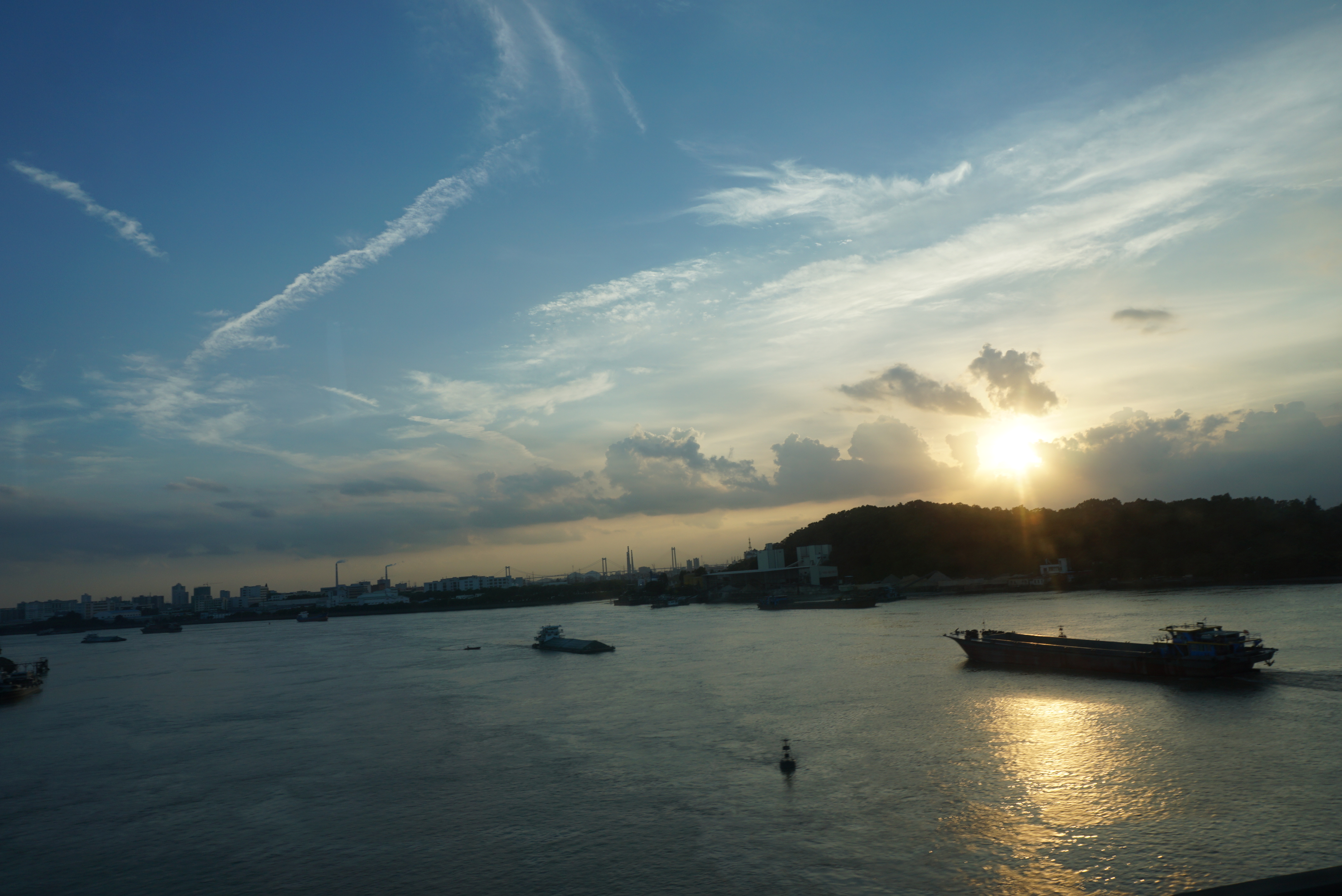
- The Dong River between Dongguan and Guangzhou

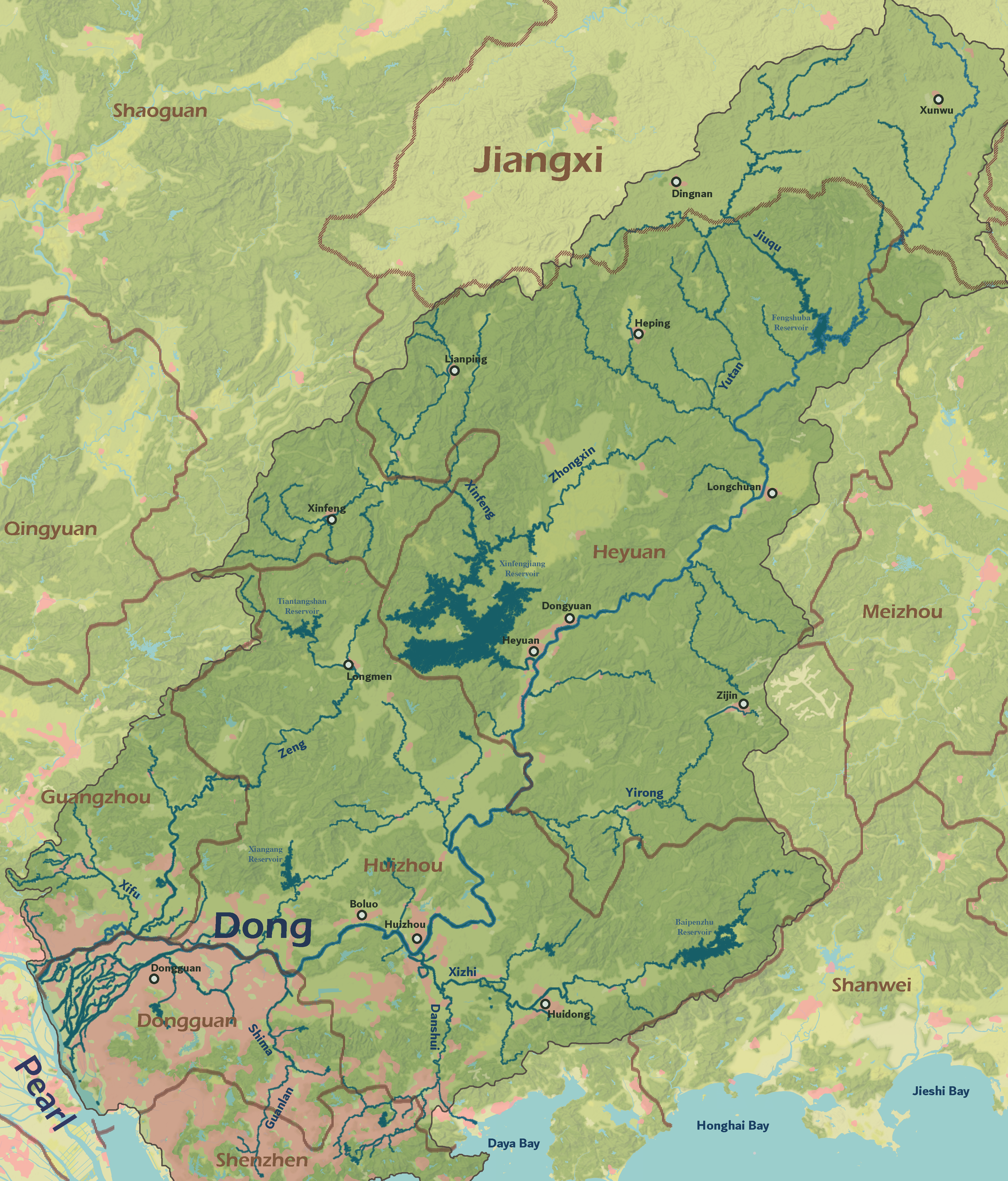
- Map of the Dong River and its tributaries
- Native name: 东江 (Chinese); Dōngjiāng (Chinese)

Location
- Country: China
- Province: Guangdong, Jiangxi

Physical characteristics
- Source: Dayu Mountains
  - location: Xunwu County, Ganzhou, Jiangxi
  - coordinates: 25.11813°N 115.58582°E
  - elevation: 2,000 ft (610 m)
- Mouth: Pearl River
  - location: Machong Town, Dongguan, Guangdong
  - coordinates: 23.03861°N 113.52134°E
  - elevation: 0 m (0 ft)
- Length: 523 km (325 mi)
- Basin size: 35,340 km^{2} (13,640 sq mi)
- Discharge
  - average: 807.5 m^{3}/s (28,520 cu ft/s)

Basin features
- Tributaries
  - left: Nangang River, Xifu River, Zeng River, Jinshui River, Shahe River, Xiaojin River, Xihe River, Xinfeng River, Yutan River, Jiuqu River, Dutian River, Mati River
  - right: Hanxi River, Shima River, Xizhi River, Yirong River, Baipu River, Honggang River, Sishui River

Dong River
- Traditional Chinese: 東江
- Simplified Chinese: 东江
- Postal: East River
- Literal meaning: East River
Transcriptions
Standard Mandarin
- Hanyu Pinyin: Dōng Jiāng
- Wade–Giles: Tung^{1} Chiang^{1}
Gan
- Romanization: Dung1gong1
Yue: Cantonese
- Jyutping: Dung1gong1

The Dong River is the easternmost main tributary of the Pearl River, flowing through Guangdong and Jiangxi in southern China. Its source is Mount Yajibo in Xunwu County in Jiangxi. Since 1960, water from the Dong has also been exported to Hong Kong.

== History ==
=== Water exports ===
In the early 1960s, the increasing demand of fresh water in Hong Kong was increasing due to a growing population. The government saw that the most efficient way to fulfill the unmet water needs was through the fresh water sources in neighboring Guangdong. On November 15th, 1960, The government reached an agreement with Guangdong authorities to take 23 million cubic meters of water a year from the Shenzhen Reservoir, which itself was connected to the Dong River.

Later, additional pumping stations and dam works were built to further extend the supply. The new annual volume of water increased to 620 million cubic meters. More extensions in 1990 upgraded existing stations, leading to a new volume of 1.7 billion cubic meters of water, of which 1.1 billion went to Hong Kong, 493 million to Shenzhen and 150 million for irrigation along the river.

Since 1960, 12 supply agreements have been signed, of which all were based on consumption projections in Hong Kong. These projections accounted for population growth, industry, commercial demands, and predications of local yields.

Due to the worsening quality of the water, the intake point of the water was moved upstream, and new sewage treatment plants were constructed.

=== Historical discoveries ===
Since 1996, Heyuan has been the site of a large number of dinosaur eggs and bone fossils, giving it the nickname "hometown of dinosaurs." The presence of eggs in good condition is likely caused by the softened soil caused by the river.

In 2019, a 9-year-old primary school student from Heyuan accidentally found dinosaur egg fossils while playing on the river bank in the downtown area. Once museum staff came, they dug out even more dinosaur eggs. Totaling to 11 eggs, they date back 66 million years.

== Geography ==
The area of the Dong River Basin is 35,340 square kilometers, with an average annual runoff of 32.66 billion cubic meters. It is the main source of water supply for Heyuan, Huizhou, Dongguan, Shenzhen, and eastern Guangzhou. The total population supplied with water is over 30 million. The total discharge of water is roughly 807.5 cubic meters per second.

The main sources of the Dong River and its upper tributary, the Jiuqu River, are at Mount Yajibo in Xunwu County and Mount Sanbai in Anyuan County, in the prefecture-level city of Ganzhou in Jiangxi. Both are in the Dayu Mountains a subrange of the greater Nanling Mountains, which span most of south China.

Reservoirs along the river include the Fengshuba Reservoir in Longchuan County, Guangdong, the Xinfengjiang Reservoir near Heyuan, and the Baipenzhu Reservoir on the Xizhi River a tributary further south in Huidong County, Huizhou.

Before meeting the Pearl River in Dongguan, it branches into several smaller streams before meeting it at different points further south.

The largest cities on the main river are Dongguan, Luoyang, Huizhou and Heyuan.

== Issues ==
As the cities of the Pearl River delta industrialized rapidly during the 20th century, the Dong River began to face worsening effects.
