= Shuizhai High School =

Chinese high school

- 水寨中学
- Wuhua County, Meizhou, Guangdong Province, China

Information
- Former name: Zhenxing High School
- School type: Public
- Established: November 15, 1914
- Grades: 10–12
- Age range: 15–18
- Language: Cantonese
- Campus size: 84,000 m^{2} (900,000 sq ft)
- Newspaper: Chun Sun

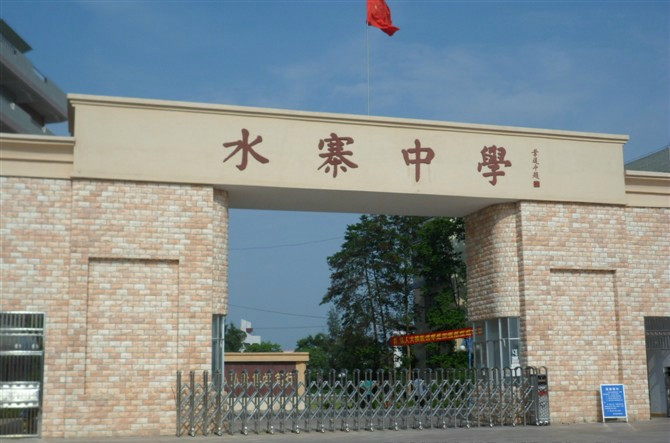
New Gate of Shuizhai High School

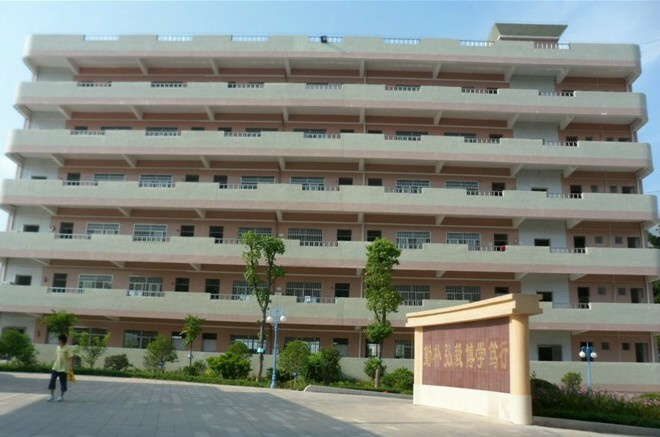
Shuizhai High School

Shuizhai High School (Chinese: 水寨中学) is a Chinese high school established in 1914. It is located in Wuhua County, Meizhou, Guangdong Province, China.

== School profile ==
Shuizhai High School spans across 84,000 square meters of area. There are 90 classes of 6,000 students with 400 staff that include 300 full-time teachers.

The school has five major departments: liberal arts, science, music, fine arts, and physical education. It is one of the ten key high schools in Meizhou and also has a football team. Shuizhai High School celebrated its centennial anniversary on November 15, 2014.

== History ==
Shuizhai High School (Chinese: 水寨中学) was established in 1914. It was once a private primary school named Zhenxing Primary School and became Zhenxing High School in 1950. In the winter of 1950, approved by the Wuhua County government, the private Zhenxing High School turned into the public Shuizhai High School. In 1974, the school was renamed Wuhua High School and resumed the name of Shuizhai High School in 1981.

It was assessed as a city-level high school in 1996 and eliminated a junior high school in 1999. It was assessed as a province-level high school in Guangdong province in 2000. The school's teaching quality has been assessed by the Guangdong Ministry of Education of the High School Teaching Level Evaluation and won the title of "Outstanding High School" in 2008. It also has been identified as a national model high school.

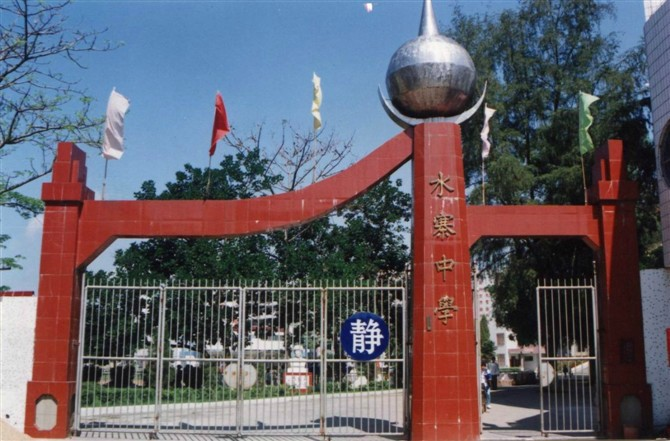
Old Gate of Shuizhai High School

== Facilities ==
The buildings in Shuizhai High School cover an area of 50,000 square meters, including classrooms, laboratory buildings, a library, a gymnasium, a teacher's office building, and faculty and student dormitory buildings. The architectural style varies. In the middle of these buildings is the standard sport ground of 400 meters plastic racetrack. The school enjoys the name "The Beautiful School of Meizhou City" for its peaceful school environment and green plants around the school roads.

== Staff ==
In recent years, the school has 400 faculty members and more than 300 full-time teachers.

== Activities ==
The school holds sports meetings and art performances every year. The literary magazine of the school is named as Chun Sun.

== Donations ==
The construction and development of the school have always been supported by alumni and people from all circles. In 1986, the Hong Kong Christians Council donated an experimental building. In 1987, an alumnus of Hong Kong, Mr. Zhou Yaojing donated a Fulin Library. In 1994, another alumnus of Hong Kong donated and built the FuLin Building, which is also an office building. In 1996, six alumni including Mr. Zhu Jianhua, Mr. Zhu Jianzhong donated a new gate. In 1996, alumnus Mr. Li Yaohua donated a YaoWen building. In November 2004, alumni donated 2.2 million RMB to build the "Ninety Years Memorial Building". In 2005, the Wuhua Hometown Association in Hong Kong donated a student dormitory building. With a rough recording, donations from alumni and society have reached 6 million RMB. In December 2014, people donated 14 million RMB on Shuizhai High School's 100th anniversary to set up Zhengxing Educational Fund and build a "Centenary Building".

== See also ==
- Education in China
