= Lu Fang =

Lu Fang is the name of:

- Lu Fang (sport shooter) (born 1972), Chinese sport shooter
- Lu Fang (character), a fictional character from The Seven Heroes and Five Gallants
- Lu Fang (warlord) (fl. 24–41), general and warlord during the Xin and Eastern Han dynasties

== See also ==
- Lü Fang, a fictional character from Water Margin
- Lufang Township (disambiguation)
