= Tanxia, Wuhua County =

Chinese town

Coordinates: 23.9446°N 115.5408°E

- Simplified Chinese: 潭下镇
Transcriptions
Standard Mandarin
- Hanyu Pinyin: Tánxià Zhèn

Tanxia is a town under the jurisdiction of Wuhua County, Meizhou City, Guangdong Province, southern China.

== See also ==
- List of township-level divisions of Guangdong
