= Nangang River (Guangdong) =

Tributary of the Dong River

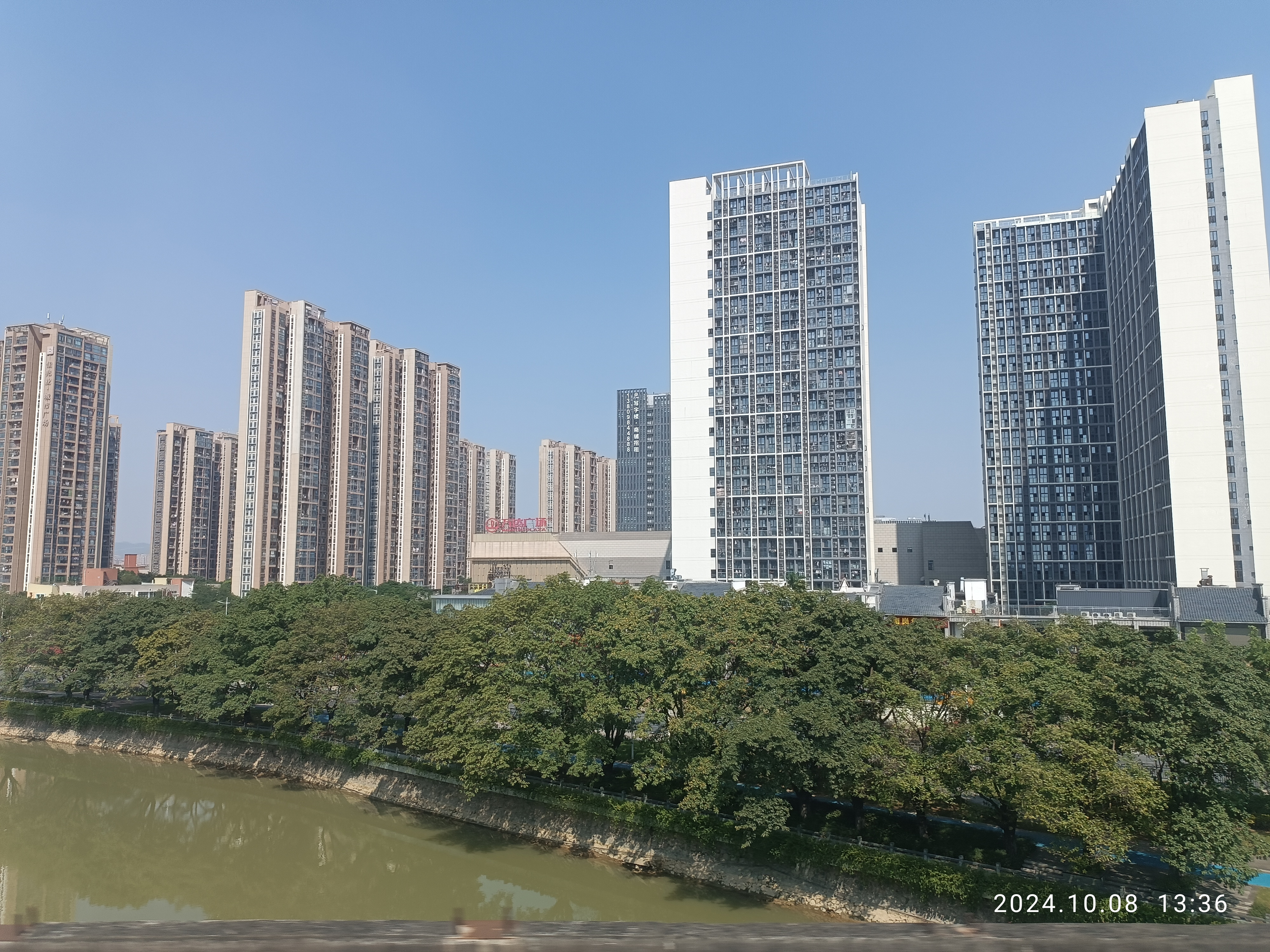

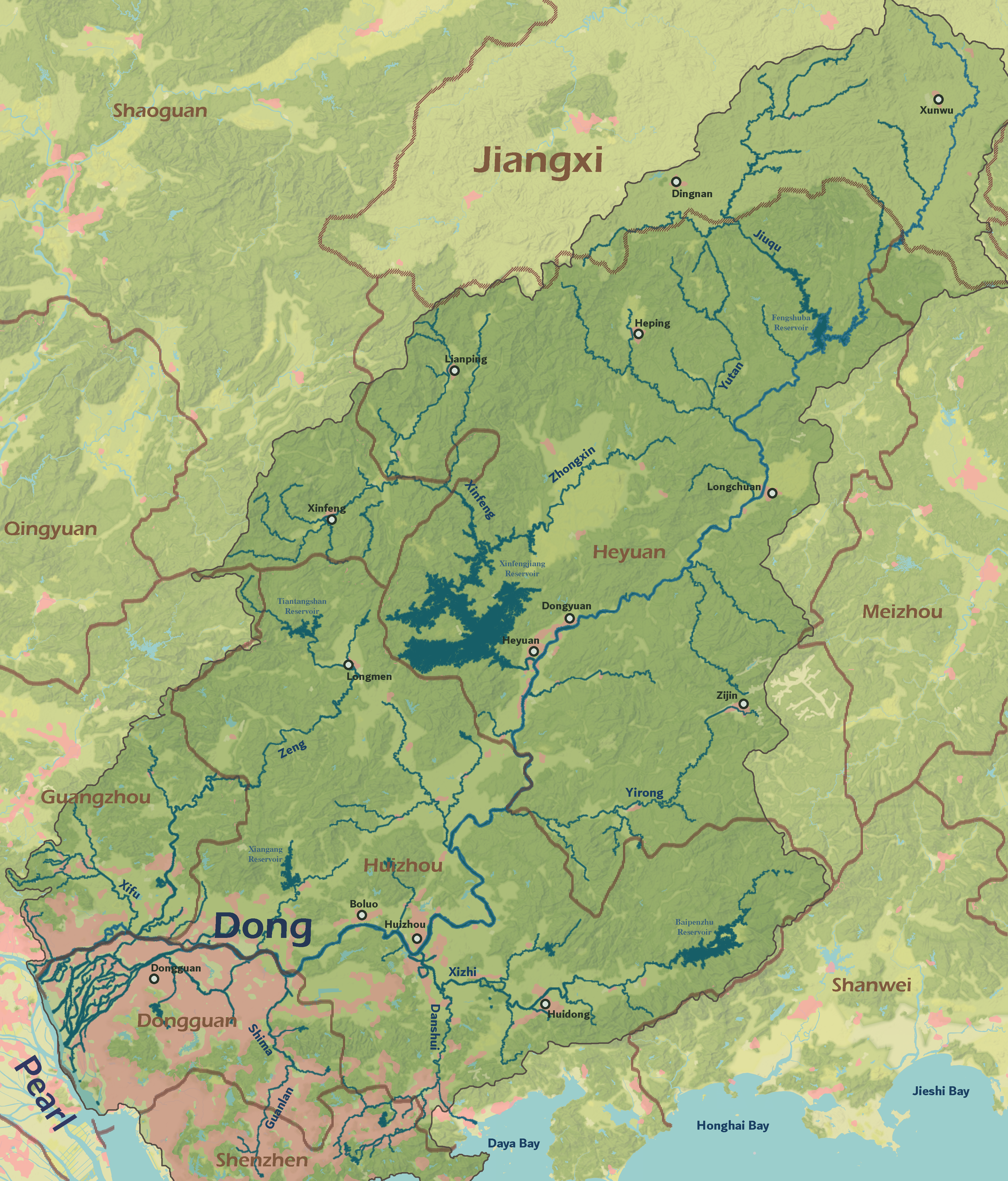
- Map of the Dong River and its tributaries. The Nangang River is the westernmost left tributary of the Dong
- Native name: 南港河 (Chinese); Nángǎng hé (Chinese)

Location
- Country: China
- Province: Guangdong

Physical characteristics
- Source: Muqiang Reservoir
  - location: Huangpu, Guangzhou, Guangdong
  - coordinates: 23°13′21″N 113°28′38″E
  - elevation: 2,000 ft (610 m)
- Mouth: Dong River
  - location: Huangpu, Guangzhou, Guangdong
  - coordinates: 23°05′08″N 113°32′56″E
  - elevation: 0 m (0 ft)
- Length: 24.12 km (14.99 mi)
- Basin size: 145 km^{2} (56 sq mi)

Nangang River
- Traditional Chinese: 南港河
- Simplified Chinese: 南港河
- Postal: South Harbor River
- Literal meaning: South Harbor River
Transcriptions
Standard Mandarin
- Hanyu Pinyin: Nángǎng hé
- Wade–Giles: Nan^{1} Kang^{1}
Yue: Cantonese
- Jyutping: Naam4gong2 ho4

The Nangang River is a tributary of the Dong River, itself a tributary of the Pearl River, in Guangdong, China. It is 24.12 kilometres (14.99 mi) long, originating in the Muqiang Reservoir in the north of Huangpu District in Guangzhou before flowing into the Dong River at the south end of the district.

Its ecological restoration in 2022 has been recognized as a national model for river governance.

== Geography ==
The river originates in the Muqiang Reservoir in Huangpu District in eastern Guangzhou before flowing southwards into the Dong River near its confluence with the Pearl River in the south of Huangpu. The river offers a livable environment for approximately 433,000 people, or about 34% of the total population of Huangpu.

In response to the "Happy Rivers and Lakes" national initiative, a project was created to transform the Nangang River, the only pilot river project in the entire Pearl River Delta region.

Following the transformation of the Nangang River, many new parks were made. The 12,000 square meter Nangang River Joyful Park being the largest. Prior to the project, the original space under the elevated bridge on the left bank of the river was enclosed, dimly lit, and inconvenient for passage.

== Economy ==
The basin of the Nangang River is home to approximately 1,300 large and medium-sized enterprises, and eight national-level innovation industrial parks, including the Huangpu Laboratory. The area has attracted 111 academicians and 1,260 high-level talents, ranking first in all of Guangzhou, becoming the most vibrant science and technology innovation zone in the east of Guangzhou.

Currently, the area along the Nangang River is primarily residential, with only a few spaces for science, education, and commercial use.

== Tourism ==
The villages of Shuixi and Shuidong in the Nangang River basin have a history of over 600 years. The ancient villages thrive in water and residents typically live by groups, similar to other places in Lingnan. Landmarks in the region include the Luogang Xiangxue and Yuyan Academy.
