= Huayang, Wuhua County =

Town in Wuhua County, Guangdong, China

Coordinates: 23.6148°N 115.4900°E

- Simplified Chinese: 华阳镇
Transcriptions
Standard Mandarin
- Hanyu Pinyin: Huáyáng Zhèn

Huayang is a town under the jurisdiction of Wuhua County, Meizhou City, Guangdong Province, southern China.

== See also ==
- List of township-level divisions of Guangdong
