= Hedong, Wuhua County =

Hedong 河东镇
- Town
- Location in Guangdong
- Coordinates: 23°55′10″N 115°46′58″E
- Country: People's Republic of China
- Province: Guangdong
- Prefecture-level city: Meizhou
- County: Wuhua
- Village-level divisions: 3 residential communities 43 villages
- Elevation: 111 m (364 ft)
- Time zone: UTC+8 (China Standard)
- Area code: 0753

Hedong (simplified Chinese: 河东; traditional Chinese: 河東; pinyin: Hédōng; lit. 'river east') is a town of Wuhua County in eastern Guangdong province, China, located southeast of and adjacent to the county seat. As of 2018, it has three residential communities (社区) and 43 villages under its administration.

== See also ==
- List of township-level divisions of Guangdong
