= Guotian =

Coordinates: 23.8384°N 115.9201°E

- Simplified Chinese: 郭田镇
Transcriptions
Standard Mandarin
- Hanyu Pinyin: Guōtián Zhèn

Guotian is a town under the jurisdiction of Wuhua County, Meizhou City, Guangdong Province, southern China.

== See also ==
- List of township-level divisions of Guangdong
