= Zhuanshui =

Town in Guangdong, China

Coordinates: 23.9928°N 115.7036°E

- Simplified Chinese: 转水镇
Transcriptions
Standard Mandarin
- Hanyu Pinyin: Zhuǎnshuǐ Zhèn

Zhuanshui is a town under the jurisdiction of Wuhua County, Meizhou City, Guangdong Province, southern China.

== See also ==
- List of township-level divisions of Guangdong
