= Lufang Township =

Lufang Township may refer to:

- Lufang Township, Jiangxi (陆坊乡), a township in Jinxi County, Jiangxi, China
- Lufang Township, Yunnan (炉房乡), a township in Qiaojia County, Yunnan, China

== See also ==
- Lu Fang (disambiguation)
- Lufeng (disambiguation)
