= Hengbei, Wuhua County =

Town in Guangdong, China

Coordinates: 23.8731°N 115.7404°E

- Simplified Chinese: 横陂镇
Transcriptions
Standard Mandarin
- Hanyu Pinyin: Héngbēi Zhèn

Hengbei is a town under the jurisdiction of Wuhua County, Meizhou City, Guangdong Province, southern China.

== See also ==
- List of township-level divisions of Guangdong
