= Zhoujiang =

Coordinates: 23.7621°N 115.5799°E

- Simplified Chinese: 周江镇
Transcriptions
Standard Mandarin
- Hanyu Pinyin: Zhōujiāng Zhèn

Zhoujiang is a town under the jurisdiction of Wuhua County, Meizhou City, Guangdong Province, southern China.

== See also ==
- List of township-level divisions of Guangdong
