= Mei Pass =

Mountain pass in Guangdong, China

Mei Pass (梅关)
- Qin Pass (秦关) and Hengpu Pass (横浦关)
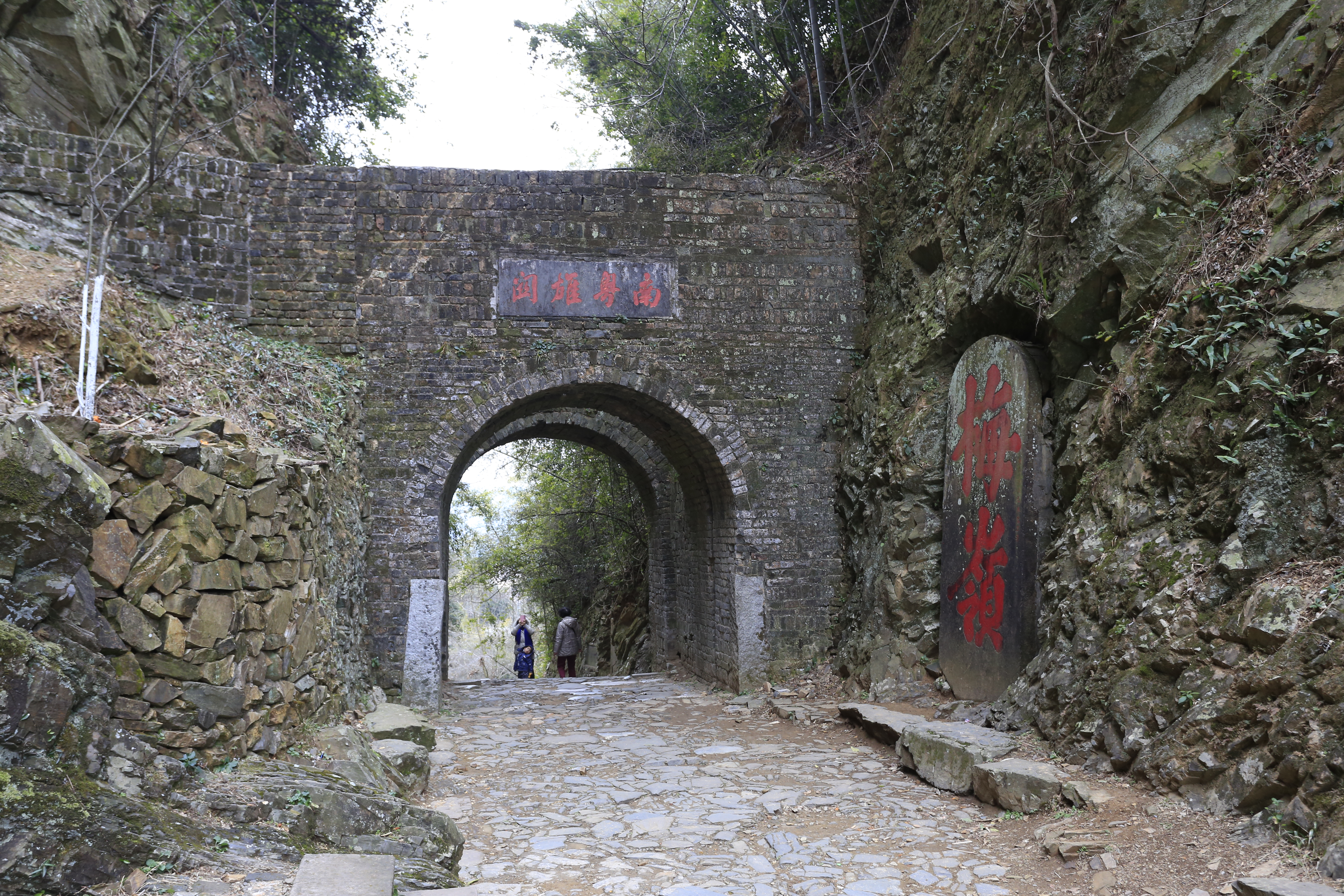
- Mei Pass from the Jiangxi side. Beyond the gate is Guangdong

- Location within Guangdong Location within China
- Traversed by: G323 (to the west), G6011 (tunnel)

Third Approach
- Location: Border between Guangdong Province and Jiangxi Province, China
- Range: Dayu Mountains of Nanling Mountains
- Coordinates: 25°20′00″N 114°20′22″E

Mei Pass
- Traditional Chinese: 梅關
- Simplified Chinese: 梅关
- Literal meaning: Plum Pass
Transcriptions
Standard Mandarin
- Hanyu Pinyin: Méi Guān

Mei Pass (simplified Chinese: 梅关; traditional Chinese: 梅關; pinyin: Méi Guān; lit. 'Plum Pass') is a strategic site around 30 kilometres (19 mi) north of Nanxiong in Guangdong, China. It is situated in the Meiling Mountains (梅岭) and forms the boundary between the provinces of Jiangxi and Guangdong.

The site of Mei Pass has been significant since the Qin dynasty (221BCE – 206CE) and its name probably dates from this early period. It was part of one of the five transport routes from the Yangtze valley to Nanhai in present-day Guangzhou. During the Tang (618–907), the site was variously called Qin Pass (秦关) and Hengpu Pass (横浦关). In 716, the Chancellor Zhang Jiuling constructed a 5 metres (16 ft) wide road through the pass as part of the trade route along the Gan River. Of the old gallery road, Zhang wrote:

Formerly, an abandoned road in the east of the pass,
Forbidding in the extreme, a hardship for men.
An unswerving course: you clambered aloft
On the outskirts of several miles of heavy forest,
With flying bridges, clinging to the brink
Halfway up a thousand fathoms [900 metres (3,000 ft)] of layered cliffs?

During the Song dynasty (960–1279), fortifications were constructed on the pass and the characters representing Mei Pass were carved on it. The Tang road was improved with brick paving. The surviving fortifications have the words "Majestic pass of Nanyue" (南粵雄關) carved on the northern side and "First pass of Lingnan" (岭南第一关) carved on the other side. (Both Nanyue and Lingnan are alternative names for Guangdong.)

Until recent decades, Mei Pass was an important thoroughfare for the overland trade south to Guangdong, as well as a militarily significant boundary. In 1928, Mao Zedong attempted to cross the pass from Jiangxi into Guangdong. In the 1930s, the Communist commander Chen Yi spent three years in the vicinity of Mei Pass fighting a protracted guerilla war against Kuomintang encirclement.

Mei Pass has been designated as a Cultural Relic Protection Unit by the provincial authorities and draws small numbers of domestic tourists. Around 8 kilometres (5.0 mi) of the Tang road and most of the Song fortifications are still extant. Most tourists visit in winter, when the plum blossoms are in full bloom.
