= Melling =

Melling may refer to:

== Places ==
- Melling, Merseyside, an area of Sefton, Merseyside, England
- Melling, Lancashire, a village near Carnforth, Lancashire, England
- Melling, New Zealand, a suburb of Lower Hutt, New Zealand
  - Melling Branch, a railway branch line
  - Melling railway station

== Motorsport ==
- Melling Racing, a NASCAR team that ran from 1982 to 2003

== Other uses ==
- Melling (surname)
- Melling, name of a GWR Hawthorn Class 2-4-0 locomotive
- Melling School, a book series by Margaret Biggs, published in the 1950s and 1960s

== See also ==
- Meling
