= Longcun, Wuhua County =

Town in Guangdong, China

Coordinates: 23.5520°N 115.5393°E

- Simplified Chinese: 龙村镇
Transcriptions
Standard Mandarin
- Hanyu Pinyin: Lóngcūn Zhèn

Longcun is a town under the jurisdiction of Wuhua County, Meizhou City, Guangdong Province, southern China.

== See also ==
- List of township-level divisions of Guangdong
