= Meling =

Meling is a surname. Notable people with the surname include:

- Andreas Meling (1839–1928), Norwegian ship owner and politician
- Birger Meling (born 1994), Norwegian footballer
- Brynjar Meling (born 1967), Norwegian lawyer
- Gerhard Meling (1892–1955), Norwegian track and field athlete
- Lars Olai Meling (1876–1951), Norwegian politician
- Siri A. Meling (born 1963), Norwegian politician

== See also ==
- Melling (disambiguation)
