= Changbu, Jiangxi =

Changbu 长埠镇
- Town
- Location in Jiangxi Changbu (China)
- Coordinates: 28°47′53″N 115°37′37″E
- Country: People's Republic of China
- Province: Jiangxi
- Prefecture-level city: Nanchang
- County: Anyi County
- Time zone: UTC+8 (China Standard)

Changbu (simplified Chinese: 长埠; traditional Chinese: 長埠; pinyin: Chángbù) is a town in Anyi County, Jiangxi, China.

== Demographics ==
As of 2018, it comprises one residential community and 9 villages under its administration.
