= Anliu =

Settlement in China

Coordinates: 23.6993°N 115.6794°E

- Simplified Chinese: 安流镇
Transcriptions
Standard Mandarin
- Hanyu Pinyin: Ānliú Zhèn

Anliu is a town under the jurisdiction of Wuhua County, Meizhou City, Guangdong Province, southern China.

== See also ==
- List of township-level divisions of Guangdong
