= Meilin, Wuhua County =

Town in Guangdong, China

Coordinates: 23.6379°N 115.6177°E

- Simplified Chinese: 梅林镇
Transcriptions
Standard Mandarin
- Hanyu Pinyin: Méilín Zhèn

Meilin is a town under the jurisdiction of Wuhua County, Meizhou City, Guangdong Province, southern China.

== Administrative divisions ==
Meilin Town includes the administrative divisions of Meilin (梅林社区), Xincheng (新成村), Fuxin (福新村), Jinkeng (金坑村), Futang (福塘村), Meibei (梅北村), Qinkou (琴口村), Xintang (新塘村), Huangsha (黄沙村), Shangzai (上再村), Huaguang (华光村), Zhaotian (招田村), Meinan (梅南村), Sanle (三乐村), Youhe (优河村), Meilin (梅林村), Meidong (梅东村), Jianshan (尖山村), and Xuanyou (宣优村).

== See also ==
- List of township-level divisions of Guangdong
