= Melling (surname) =

Melling is a surname. Notable people with the surname include:

- Al Melling, British automobile designer
- Antoine Ignace Melling (1763–1831), Ottoman painter
- Chris Melling, British pool player
- Gerald Melling, New Zealand architect and writer
- Harry Melling (born 1989), English actor
- Harry Melling (NASCAR owner) (1945–1999), American businessman
- O. R. Melling, pen-name of G.V. Whelan, Canadian writer

Fictional characters:

- Victor Melling, character in the film Miss Congeniality
