= Meilin Gray =

Meilin
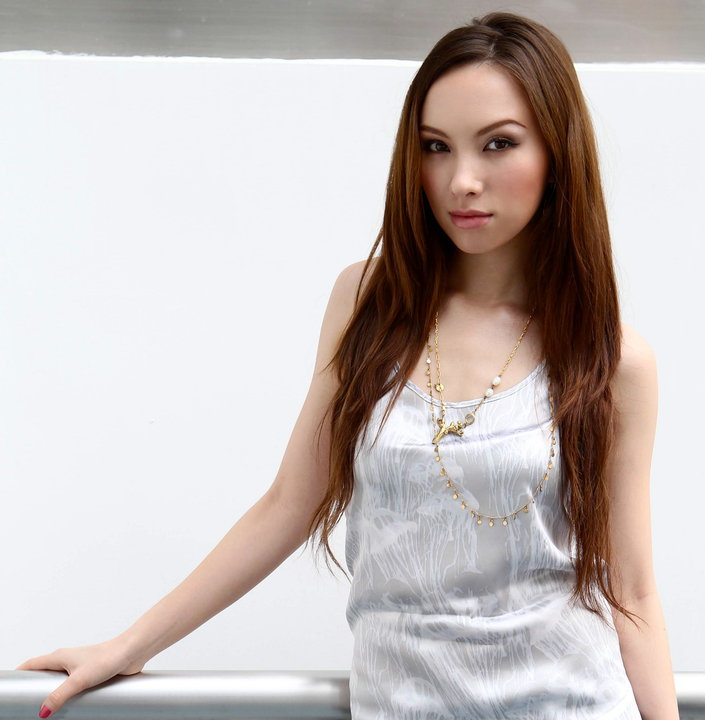
- Meilin at a photo shoot for China Daily. Beijing, China. Jun 25, 2010
- Born: Alyssa Meilin Gray (梅琳); Redwood City, California
- Occupations: Singer, Composer, Actress, Choreographer, Lyricist, Dancer, Entrepreneur
- Years active: 2006 – present
- Musical career
- Genres: Mandopop, Chinese rock, Chinese R&B, Alternative
- Instruments: Guitar, piano, flute, traditional Chinese instruments
- Label: Mestere Records
- Website: www.meilingray.com

Alyssa Meilin Gray is an American-Chinese pop singer and songwriter, based in Beijing, China. Meilin first appeared on Chinese national and worldwide television in 2006 with her younger sister, Suelin, winning first place on Beijing Television's 'Arts of Our Land' competition, performing a traditional Chinese 'hulusi' flute duet. BTV's Arts of Our Land competition (Wai Guo Ren Zhong Hua Cai Yi Da Sai), was China's then-premier international competition for foreigners to showcase their talents in traditional Chinese art and culture.

Following success on BTV's 'Arts of Our Land', Meilin entered China Central Television's 'Xing Guang Da Dao' Star Search competition, China's foremost national talent competition, where she won first place in both the weekly and monthly competitions.

In 2007, Meilin (梅琳) and Hong Kong singer and actor, Nicholas Tse, recorded the theme song and music video for the Mandarin language release of Disney's 1991 film Beauty and the Beast, which gave Meilin her first commercial success, with the song reaching No.2 on Pepsi's Chinese Billboard Pop Charts.

== Early life and family ==
Meilin was born in Redwood City, California.

Meilin's family has been a major influence on her interest in music. Her father is a music recording enthusiast, who commandeered the family den into service as a recording studio when Meilin was 1-year old. Later, after relocating the family to China, he built a larger recording studio and continued experimenting with creating the music that eventually became Meilin's first recordings and the backing tracks for her public performances.

Her father's grandfather and grandmother, Paul Yale and Dot Davidson, had been professional child actors in vaudeville. They met in 1911 as touring members of the Marx Brothers vaudeville act and were married on tour in 1912, later performing leading theater roles on Broadway in New York City. Meilin's great uncle, Oakley Yale, was an accordionist and music teacher, who transposed and recorded classical symphonic music on accordion, touring Europe for many years with his accordion orchestra. Meilin's father's mother was also an accordionist, who performed on USO Armed Services Radio during World War II. On her mother's side of the family in China, her mother and uncle studied violin prior to the closing of school during the Cultural Revolution.

Throughout her early youth, Meilin studied the performing arts; Broadway vocals, classical piano and jazz flute, as well as ballet, tap and jazz dance.

== Music and stage career ==
In 1996, Meilin began her acting career in San Mateo in supporting roles in the College of Notre Dame's yearly performance of 'A Christmas Carol', the story of Scrooge, which she performed in for three years. In 1997, Meilin began an association with the San Mateo Performing Arts Group, with roles in the musicals 'Wizard of Oz', and 'The King & I', where she first came under the tutelage of professional actors and actresses.

By 2000, Meilin had begun her early singing career, establishing a local singing group composed of school friends, which she called 'Mestere', a name which she later used for her record company.

== Relocating to China ==
Meilin's parents' connection with China meant that Meilin visited her family there periodically throughout her childhood, exposing her to Chinese music and culture early on. In 2002, while visiting family in China, Meilin decided she wanted to take one semester at a Chinese school to become more familiar with the Chinese language and culture. Her father and mother were considering moving the family to China for business reasons, so Meilin moved over first, followed up a few months later by her entire family. She attended Nanjing Experimental Middle School, then relocated to Beijing, where she attended Bei Da Experimental School, and later a special music program focused on classical guitar at a public high school in the Haidian District of Beijing.

== Chinese competitions ==
In late 2005, Meilin entered her first singing competition in China, the citywide 'New Youth Singer's' competition in the city of Tianjin. By week-long TV call-in voting, Meilin was chosen by viewers as the top 'New Entertainer' among the original 800 competitors.

Following her success in various city-level singing competitions, in late 2005, Meilin began hosting 'Vantage Point', a 26-episode half-hour television series, presenting Chinese traditional arts and crafts to Chinese audiences, in the Mandarin language. During the taping of one of these shows, Meilin was introduced to the Chinese traditional gourd flute known as the 'hulusi', which she and her younger sister then learned well enough to perform a duet, winning first place on (BTV) Beijing Television's 'Arts of Our Land' international talent competition in early 2006. Meilin then entered CCTV's 'Xing Guang Da Dao' Star Search, winning both weekly and monthly competitions.

During 2006–2007 Meilin performed in over 60 shows, both as a solo artist and with her sister Suelin. Meilin was invited by the Chinese folk singer 'A Bao' to perform a duet at the Great Hall of the People, and she and her sister, Suelin, performed a hulusi Chinese flute duet at this same venue in late 2006.

== 2008 Beijing Olympics ==
In the run-up period to the 2008 Summer Olympics, Meilin recorded the lead vocal on the official theme songs for China's pre-Olympics promotional tour of America. The song was 'Welcome to Beijing in 2008', and featured Meilin in lead vocal, backed by a children's choir of over 20 singers. The song was recorded on March 15, 2008, at the Beijing studios of China's Air Force Blue Sky Children's Art and Entertainment Group. The Beijing city government sent more than 500 entertainers to America to promote the Beijing Olympics, and this song was featured as one of the main theme songs heard throughout that tour, with versions of the song created for the various cities they visited.

In August 2007, China's Olympic Committee staged the one-year countdown celebration to the Olympics, featuring 100 of China's top singers on Tiananmen Square, singing the official Olympics countdown song called, 'We Are Ready', Meilin was the only foreigner invited to participate in this event, which was broadcast worldwide on China Central Television.She was also featured in the official printed book commemorating this song and event, with a full-page photo and her signature.

== Artistic development and university ==
Throughout 2007 and 2008, Meilin participated in many televised events, including an official show at China's 'White House', a state holiday dinner attended by over 200 foreign ambassadors. Meilin was introduced to China's Minister of Foreign Affairs and sang a solo part in the final song, broadcast on CCTV. In 2008, Meilin was a guest artist in the Chinese Spring Festival Evening Concert.

In 2009, Meilin was a featured singer in the opening ceremonies of the 24th World University Winter Olympiad, held in Harbin.

Meilin attended Berklee College of Music in Boston, USA during the summer of 2009, taking courses in music theory, songwriting, and performing. This was followed by a month of study at "The Acting Corps" in Los Angeles, with personalized classes in acting, dance, and performing arts.

In 2007, Meilin was given a scholarship at Tianjin Normal University and began her undergraduate study with a major in Performing Arts. Since then, she has divided her time between formal university study and performing and recording.

== Discography ==
=== Single with Nicholas Tse ===
- 2007: "Beauty and the Beast" a Disney release.

=== Singles in Chinese ===
- 2009: "Why"
- 2010: "Confession"
- 2010: "Changes"
- 2011: "Thought I'd Lost You"

=== Singles in English ===
- 2010: "If You Knew"
- 2010: "Thought I'd Lost You"
- 2010: "Make It"
- 2011: "Tastes Like Sugar"
- 2011: "Make It: AGAIN"
- 2011: "If You Knew (Remix)" (featuring Cryptik Soul)
