= Shuizhai, Wuhua County =

Town in Guangdong, China

Coordinates: 23.9236°N 115.7609°E

- Simplified Chinese: 水寨镇
Transcriptions
Standard Mandarin
- Hanyu Pinyin: Shuǐzhài Zhèn

Shuizhai is a town under the jurisdiction of Wuhua County, Meizhou City, Guangdong Province, southern China.

== See also ==
- List of township-level divisions of Guangdong
