= Lufeng =

Lufeng may refer to：

- Lufeng, Guangdong (陆丰市), county-level city of Shanwei, Guangdong
- Lufeng, Xupu (卢峰镇), a town of Xupu County, Hunan
- Lufeng, Yunnan (禄丰市), county-level city of Chuxiong Prefecture, Yunnan
- Lufeng dialect (陆丰话), or Haifeng dialect, mostly spoken in Shanwei, Haifeng and Lufeng, Guangdong

== See also ==
- Lufang Township (disambiguation)
