= Meiling Subdistrict, Jinjiang =

Meiling Subdistrict 梅岭街道
- Subdistrict
- Location in Fujian
- Coordinates: 24.8126°N 118.5640°E
- Country: People's Republic of China
- Province: Fujian
- Prefecture-level city: Quanzhou
- County-level city: Jinjiang
- Time zone: UTC+8 (China Standard)

Meiling Subdistrict (Chinese: 梅岭街道; pinyin: Méilǐng Jiēdào) is a subdistrict in Jinjiang, Fujian, China. As of 2018, it has 15 residential communities under its administration.

== See also ==
- List of township-level divisions of Fujian
