= Meilin Miranda =

American novelist

Lynn Siprelle
- Born: Portland, Oregon, U.S.
- Occupation: Novelist
- Children: 2
- Writing career
- Pen name: MeiLin Miranda
- Genres: fantasy, historical fiction, steampunk
- Notable works: Lovers and Beloveds
- Website: meilinmiranda.com

Lynn Siprelle, better known by the pen name MeiLin Miranda, is the American author of the fantasy series An Intimate History of the Greater Kingdom. She is also the author of the online fantasy western serial Scryer's Gulch. She co-authored the shared steampunk fantasy series The Drifting Isle Chronicles. Her fantasy and science fiction novels are set in the Victorian era.

== Early life ==
Miranda has enjoyed stories set in the 19th century since childhood, beginning with Louisa May Alcott. She enjoyed the books Master and Commander, Little Women, The Diamond Age, The Way We Live Now, Northanger Abbey, The Left Hand of Darkness, and Wild Seed. Miranda is influenced by almost all of the 19th century setting, with the exceptions of cholera, child labor, slavery and no rights for women. For thirty years, Miranda wrote nonfiction. She was a journalist for radio, television, print, and the web. Then a series of unfortunate events that resulted in a cardiac arrest and a near-death experience inspired her to write fiction novels.

== Crowdfunding ==
The An Intimate History of the Greater Kingdom series was funded entirely by its audience.

Miranda began writing this series in 2007. She posted the first draft in serial form on the internet in 2008. It was a success; at one point in 2008, 2000 people were reading it per day. She realized the series was not sustainable in serial form in 2009. So she took it down, and solicited support from her fans to make the series into a novel. The first book in the series Lovers and Beloveds was completely crowdfunded, via early donation sources such as PayPal and critically acclaimed in 2010.

The second book was also crowdfunded, and met its goal in 4 days through Kickstarter.

== Publications ==
=== Intimate History series ===
1. Lovers and Beloveds (October 19, 2010) #3 on Amazon US's free epic fantasy list, 2010 Top 6 indie fantasy book
2. Son in Sorrow (April 28, 2012)
3. 'TBA'(2014)
- The Gratification Engine: An Anda Barrows and Allis Obby Story (February 19, 2011)
- Fairy Tales from the Greater Kingdom: Tremontine Stories for Children (October 10, 2013)
- Accounts: An Allis and Issak Obby Story (December 31, 2013)

=== Drifting Isle Chronicles ===
- The Machine God (August 22, 2013)

=== Scryer's Gulch: Magic in the Wild, Wild West ===
- Annabelle Arrives (February 16, 2010)
- Fears Moon Woman: A Rabbit Runnels Story (September 1, 2011)

=== Audiobooks ===
- The Mage's Toy (Aria Afton Presents) narrated by Audrey Lusk (May 14, 2014)
- The Amber Cross by MeiLin Miranda and Jane Austen. Narrated by Lee MacAllister (February 20, 2013)
- Dalston Junction narrated by Nicole Quinn (June 4, 2012)

=== Co-authored ===
- Other Sides: 12 Webfiction Tales by Zoe E. Whitten, G L Drummond, MeiLin Miranda and MCM (January 31, 2011)
- Like a Moonrise: Erotic Tales of Shapeshifters (Erotic Fantasy & Science Fiction Selections) by MeiLin Miranda, Marie Carlson, Kyell Gold and Catt Kingsgrave (January 4, 2011)
