= MEI Mercury =

Type of grenade

The MEI Mercury is a family of medium-range low-impulse 40mm grenade (40×46mmSR) developed by Martin Electronics, Inc. (MEI) that can reach out to 800 meters. The rounds are a fixed type ammunition designed to be fired from a 40 mm Grenade Launcher such as the M79, M203, M320 (attached to the M16 rifle or M4 carbine), or Milkor MK-1.

== Technical information ==
=== High explosive dual purpose ===
- Body material: Steel
- Fuse: SF801/M550
- Charge: 86g A5
- Weapons: M79, M203, Milkor MK-1 launchers
- Penetration: 90 mm mild steel at normal impact with anti-personnel fragmentation
- Range: (max.) 800 m
- Muzzle velocity: 110 m/s

=== Covert infrared marker ===
- IR footprint: 28'L × 5'W
- IR viability: 15+ nm
- Range: (max.) 650 m

== See also ==
- MEI HELLHOUND
- M32 Grenade Launcher (Milkor MGL)
- M79 grenade launcher
- China Lake NATIC (EX-41)
- M203 grenade launcher
- M320 grenade launcher
- MK19
- SAG-30
