= Huacheng =

Huacheng 华城镇
- Town
- Location in Guangdong
- Coordinates: 24°03′47″N 115°37′00″E
- Country: People's Republic of China
- Province: Guangdong
- Prefecture-level city: Meizhou
- County: Wuhua
- Time zone: UTC+8 (China Standard)
- Postal code: 514400
- Area code: 0753

Huacheng
- Traditional Chinese: 華城
- Simplified Chinese: 华城
Transcriptions
Standard Mandarin
- Hanyu Pinyin: Huáchéng
- Bopomofo: ㄏㄨㄚˊ ㄔㄥˊ
- Wade–Giles: Hua^{2}-ch‘êng^{2}
- IPA: [xwǎ.ʈʂʰə̌ŋ]
Hakka
- Pha̍k-fa-sṳ: Fà-sàng
Yue: Cantonese
- Yale Romanization: Wàhsìhng
- Jyutping: Waa^{4} Sing^{4}
- IPA: [wa˩.sɪŋ˩]

Huacheng (simplified Chinese: 华城; traditional Chinese: 華城; pinyin: Huáchéng) is a town of Wuhua County, in northeastern Guangdong province, China. As of 2011, It has 3 residential communities (社区) and 34 villages under its administration.
