= Mianyang, Guangdong =

Town in Wuhua County, Guangdong, China

Coordinates: 23.6294°N 115.7146°E

- Simplified Chinese: 棉洋镇
Transcriptions
Standard Mandarin
- Hanyu Pinyin: Miányáng Zhèn

Mianyang is a town under the jurisdiction of Wuhua County, Meizhou City, Guangdong Province, southern China.

In 2024, Mianyang's population was estimated to be 1,376,450.

== See also ==
- List of township-level divisions of Guangdong
