= Mei Ling Young =

Malaysian Chinese social scientist

Dr Mei Ling Young (1949 – 20 January 2021) was a Malaysian Chinese social scientist, international development scholar and academic administrator. She was the Deputy Vice-Chancellor (i.e. Vice President) of the International Medical University, a university she co-founded in 1992. She was also the president of the Malaysian Association of Private Colleges and Universities since 2015.

She gained a BA in geography at the University of Auckland and a PhD in demography at the Australian National University. She was a lecturer in development studies at the University of Science, Malaysia. In 1981 she founded the Sesama Consulting Group, which focused on development planning and urban studies, particularly urbanisation in developing countries. Her interest in development issues led her to become a principal co-founder of the International Medical University (IMU) in Kuala Lumpur in 1992. She had served as the university's provost, as executive director of IMU Education, and as Company Director of IMU Health and IMU Healthcare.

== Death ==
Dr Young died in the morning of 20 January 2021. The announcement of her death was made on the official website of International Medical University.

== Works ==
- Migrants and niches, 1982
- Social forces, the state and the international division of labour: the case of Malaysia, 1987

== Honours ==
- Doctor of Science (honoris causa), University of Strathclyde, 2013
- Doctor of Laws (honoris causa), University of Dundee, 2014
- ASME Gold Medal, 2017
