= Zijin County =

Zijin 紫金县
- County
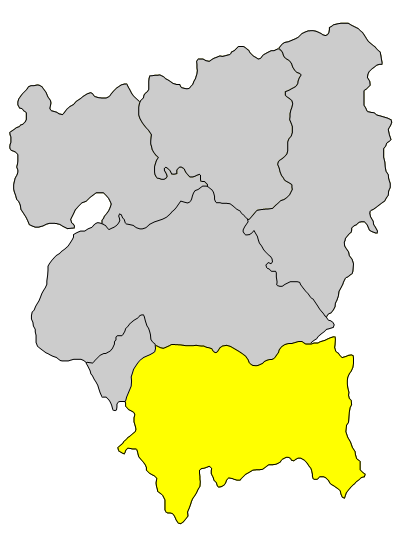
- Zijin in Heyuan

- Heyuan in Guangdong
- Coordinates: 23°38′07″N 115°11′03″E
- Country: People's Republic of China
- Province: Guangdong
- Prefecture-level city: Heyuan

Area
  - Total: 3,627 km^{2} (1,400 sq mi)

Population (2020 census)
  - Total: 551,095
  - Density: 151.9/km^{2} (393.5/sq mi)
- Time zone: UTC+8 (China Standard)

Zijin County (postal: Tzekam; Chinese: 紫金縣; pinyin: Zǐjīn Xiàn; Hakka Pha̍k-fa-sṳ: Tsṳ́-kîm-yen) is a county in the east of Guangdong Province, China. It is the southernmost county-level division of the prefecture-level city of Heyuan. The county was known as Yongan County (postal: Wingon) before January 1914.

== Language ==
As citizens in Zijin are mostly Hakka people, Hakka Chinese is the most common language there.

== Economy ==
In 2007, GRP of Zijin is 4.67 billion dollars, and its gross output value of industry and agriculture is 5.521 billion dollars.

== Climate ==
Climate data for Zijin, elevation 177 m (581 ft), (1991–2020 normals, extremes 1981–2010)
Month	Jan	Feb	Mar	Apr	May	Jun	Jul	Aug	Sep	Oct	Nov	Dec	Year
Record high °C (°F)	28.3 (82.9)	30.4 (86.7)	33.0 (91.4)	34.2 (93.6)	35.5 (95.9)	37.8 (100.0)	37.4 (99.3)	37.1 (98.8)	36.9 (98.4)	34.8 (94.6)	34.1 (93.4)	30.2 (86.4)	37.8 (100.0)
Mean daily maximum °C (°F)	19.1 (66.4)	20.5 (68.9)	23.2 (73.8)	26.9 (80.4)	30.0 (86.0)	31.8 (89.2)	33.4 (92.1)	33.1 (91.6)	31.8 (89.2)	29.0 (84.2)	25.3 (77.5)	20.5 (68.9)	27.1 (80.7)
Daily mean °C (°F)	12.5 (54.5)	14.6 (58.3)	17.6 (63.7)	21.7 (71.1)	24.9 (76.8)	26.8 (80.2)	27.8 (82.0)	27.5 (81.5)	26.2 (79.2)	22.8 (73.0)	18.5 (65.3)	13.8 (56.8)	21.2 (70.2)
Mean daily minimum °C (°F)	8.4 (47.1)	10.7 (51.3)	14.0 (57.2)	18.1 (64.6)	21.3 (70.3)	23.5 (74.3)	24.1 (75.4)	24.1 (75.4)	22.5 (72.5)	18.5 (65.3)	14.1 (57.4)	9.5 (49.1)	17.4 (63.3)
Record low °C (°F)	−2.4 (27.7)	−1.5 (29.3)	−0.8 (30.6)	7.6 (45.7)	14.1 (57.4)	15.6 (60.1)	20.0 (68.0)	21.1 (70.0)	13.4 (56.1)	7.4 (45.3)	1.5 (34.7)	−2.7 (27.1)	−2.7 (27.1)
Average precipitation mm (inches)	49.0 (1.93)	58.3 (2.30)	127.7 (5.03)	197.4 (7.77)	233.7 (9.20)	315.2 (12.41)	203.0 (7.99)	238.3 (9.38)	138.2 (5.44)	45.8 (1.80)	35.5 (1.40)	40.5 (1.59)	1,682.6 (66.24)
Average precipitation days (≥ 0.1 mm)	6.6	9.9	13.8	15.4	18.2	20.3	17.8	18.7	12.7	5.1	5.2	6.3	150
Average relative humidity (%)	75	78	80	81	82	84	82	83	80	75	75	74	79
Mean monthly sunshine hours	126.0	93.1	86.2	92.5	124.2	141.7	197.9	178.8	170.5	175.5	154.9	143.5	1,684.8
Percentage possible sunshine	37	29	23	24	30	35	48	45	47	49	47	43	38
Source: China Meteorological Administration
