= MEI Hellhound (grenade) =

The MEI Hellhound 40 mm low-velocity multi-purpose grenade is a fixed-type munition designed to be fired from a 40×46mm grenade launcher such as the M79, M203, M320 (attached to the M16 series of rifles or M4 carbine), or Milkor MK-1. The round consists of a metal projectile body, a fuze, and a cartridge case assembly. Upon impact with the target, the firing pin is driven into the detonator, which in turn sets off the round, producing a jet which sets off the explosive from the base forward. This results in an armor-piercing jet of molten metal and fragmentation of the projectile body. The MEI Hellhound uses the same high-low propulsion system as other 40 mm grenade launchers.

== Technical information ==
- Type: High-explosive dual purpose (HEDP)
- Manufacturer: Martin Electronics, Inc. (MEI)
- Body material: Steel
- Weight: 224.56 grams (87.67 grams A5)
- Fuse: SF801/M550
- Length: 110 mm (4.3 in)
- Charge: A5
- Weapons: M79, M203, Milkor MK-1 launchers
- Penetration: 90 mm (3.5 in) mild steel at normal impact with anti-personnel fragmentation
- Range: (Max.) 400 m (437.6 yds), lethal radius of around 30 feet
- Muzzle velocity: 80 m/s (262 ft/s)

== See also ==
- MEI Mercury
- China Lake NATIC (EX-41)
