= Anyi County =

Coordinates: 28.8389°N 115.599°E

Anyi 安义县 Ani
- County
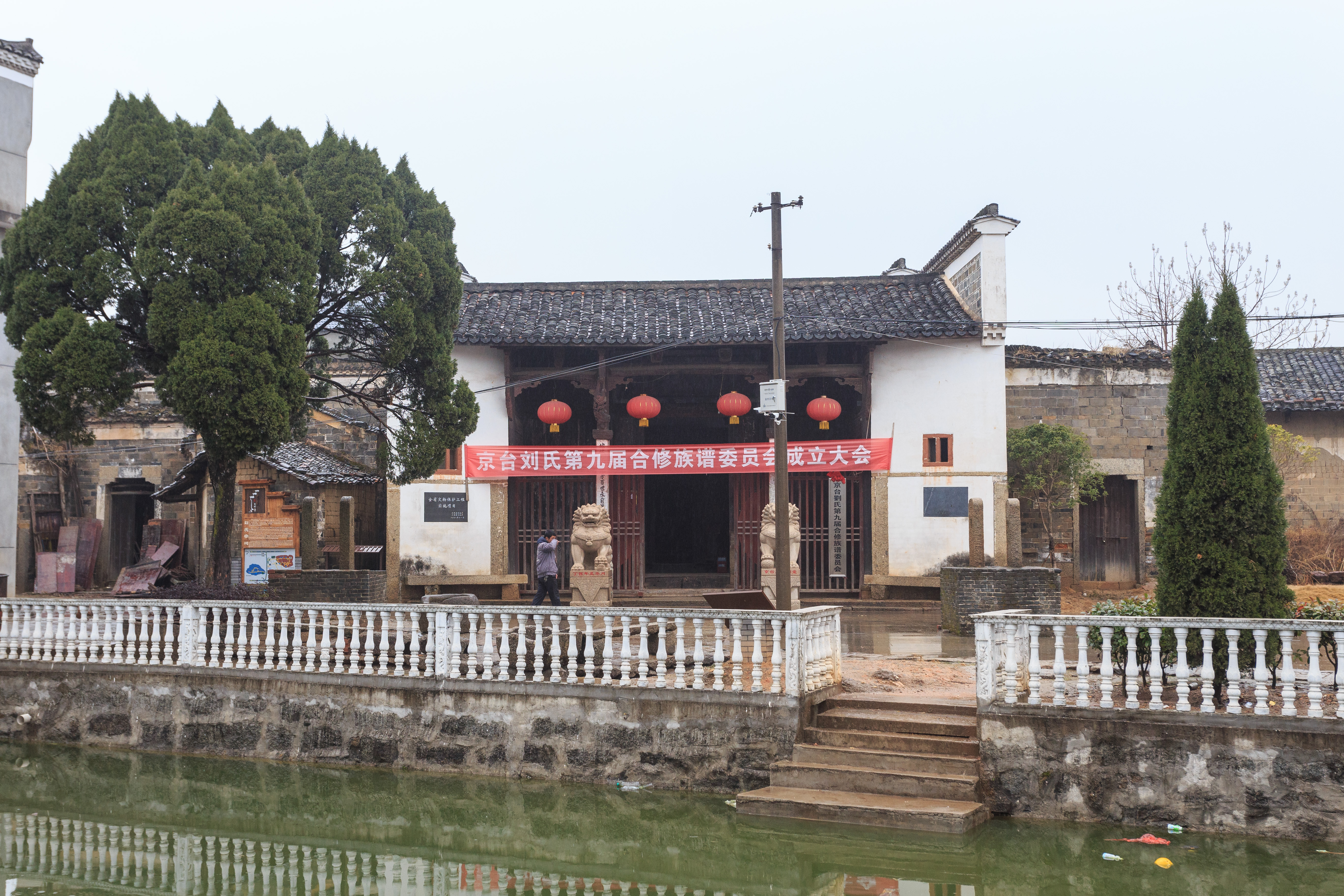

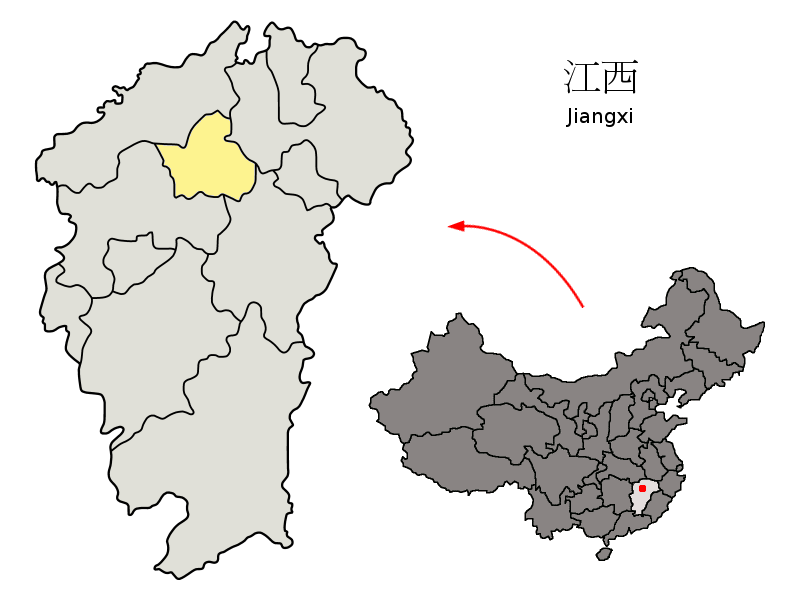
- Location of Nanchang City (yellow) within Jiangxi Province
- Country: People's Republic of China
- Province: Jiangxi
- Prefecture-level city: Nanchang

Area
  - Total: 665.49 km^{2} (256.95 sq mi)

Population (2018)
  - Total: 306,500
  - Density: 460.6/km^{2} (1,193/sq mi)
- Time zone: UTC+8 (China Standard)
- Postal code: 330500

Anyi (simplified Chinese: 安义县; traditional Chinese: 安義縣; pinyin: Ānyì Xiàn, Anyi dialect: [on˩ ɲi˨˧]) is a county of Jiangxi Province, China. It is under the administration of the prefecture-level city of Nanchang, the provincial capital.

The county has an area of 656 square kilometers, making it one of the smallest counties in Jiangxi. Its postal code is 330500. In 1999, the county had a population of 235,933. In 2003, the county population reached 249,000.

== Administration ==
Anyi County is divided to 7 towns and 3 townships.

=== Towns ===
- Longjin (龙津镇)
- Dinghu (鼎湖镇)
- Huangzhou (黄洲镇)
- Changbu (长埠镇)
- Shibi (石鼻镇)
- Dongyang (东阳镇)
- Wanbu (万埠镇)

=== Townships ===
- Qiaole (乔乐乡)
- Changjun (长均乡)
- Xinmin (新民乡)

== Climate ==
Climate data for Anyi, elevation 41 m (135 ft), (1991–2020 normals, extremes 1981–present)
Month	Jan	Feb	Mar	Apr	May	Jun	Jul	Aug	Sep	Oct	Nov	Dec	Year
Record high °C (°F)	23.5 (74.3)	28.0 (82.4)	32.0 (89.6)	34.3 (93.7)	35.1 (95.2)	37.3 (99.1)	40.3 (104.5)	40.6 (105.1)	37.8 (100.0)	35.2 (95.4)	30.8 (87.4)	23.1 (73.6)	40.6 (105.1)
Mean daily maximum °C (°F)	9.5 (49.1)	12.2 (54.0)	16.3 (61.3)	22.6 (72.7)	27.3 (81.1)	29.7 (85.5)	33.2 (91.8)	33.1 (91.6)	29.7 (85.5)	24.8 (76.6)	18.5 (65.3)	12.3 (54.1)	22.4 (72.4)
Daily mean °C (°F)	5.1 (41.2)	7.6 (45.7)	11.5 (52.7)	17.5 (63.5)	22.3 (72.1)	25.4 (77.7)	28.4 (83.1)	28.0 (82.4)	24.3 (75.7)	18.9 (66.0)	12.8 (55.0)	7.0 (44.6)	17.4 (63.3)
Mean daily minimum °C (°F)	2.0 (35.6)	4.2 (39.6)	7.9 (46.2)	13.5 (56.3)	18.4 (65.1)	22.1 (71.8)	24.7 (76.5)	24.4 (75.9)	20.4 (68.7)	14.5 (58.1)	8.7 (47.7)	3.4 (38.1)	13.7 (56.6)
Record low °C (°F)	−6.9 (19.6)	−6.4 (20.5)	−3.9 (25.0)	−0.3 (31.5)	7.7 (45.9)	12.8 (55.0)	17.0 (62.6)	17.9 (64.2)	10.2 (50.4)	2.0 (35.6)	−3.2 (26.2)	−10.7 (12.7)	−10.7 (12.7)
Average precipitation mm (inches)	75.1 (2.96)	91.9 (3.62)	167.4 (6.59)	211.4 (8.32)	215.7 (8.49)	317.5 (12.50)	192.7 (7.59)	119.4 (4.70)	70.6 (2.78)	46.5 (1.83)	76.0 (2.99)	50.1 (1.97)	1,634.3 (64.34)
Average precipitation days (≥ 0.1 mm)	12.9	12.4	17.2	16.2	15.4	16.5	12.0	11.8	7.3	7.2	9.1	9.5	147.5
Average snowy days	2.9	1.8	0.4	0	0	0	0	0	0	0	0.1	1.1	6.3
Average relative humidity (%)	79	79	81	80	80	85	81	81	79	75	78	76	80
Mean monthly sunshine hours	83.9	83.8	96.5	121.4	138.2	130.5	208.2	206.4	175.0	163.1	134.5	124.3	1,665.8
Percentage possible sunshine	26	26	26	31	33	31	49	51	48	46	42	39	37
Source: China Meteorological Administrationall-time extreme temperatureall-time May low
