= Mei Lin =

Mei Lin may refer to:

- Mei Lin (actress)
- Mei Lin (chef)

== See also ==
- Meilin (disambiguation)
