= Changbu, Guangdong =

Changbu 长布镇
- Town
- Location in Guangdong
- Coordinates: 23.7980°N 115.4456°E
- Country: People's Republic of China
- Province: Guangdong
- Prefecture-level city: Meizhou
- County: Wuhua County
- Time zone: UTC+8 (China Standard)

Changbu (simplified Chinese: 长布; traditional Chinese: 長布; pinyin: Chángbù) is a town under the jurisdiction of Wuhua County, Meizhou City, Guangdong Province, southern China. As of 2018, it has two residential communities and 25 villages under its administration.

== See also ==
- List of township-level divisions of Guangdong
