= Jiexi County =

Jiexi 揭西县
- County
- Location of the seat in Guangdong
- Coordinates: 23.431°N 115.842°E
- Country: People's Republic of China
- Province: Guangdong
- Prefecture-level city: Jieyang

Area
  - Total: 1,279 km^{2} (494 sq mi)

Population (2020)
  - Total: 674,829
  - Density: 527.6/km^{2} (1,367/sq mi)
- Time zone: UTC+8 (China Standard)

Jiexi County
- Simplified Chinese: 揭西县
- Traditional Chinese: 揭西縣
Transcriptions
Standard Mandarin
- Hanyu Pinyin: Jiēxīxiàn
Yue: Cantonese
- Jyutping: kit3 sai1 jyun6

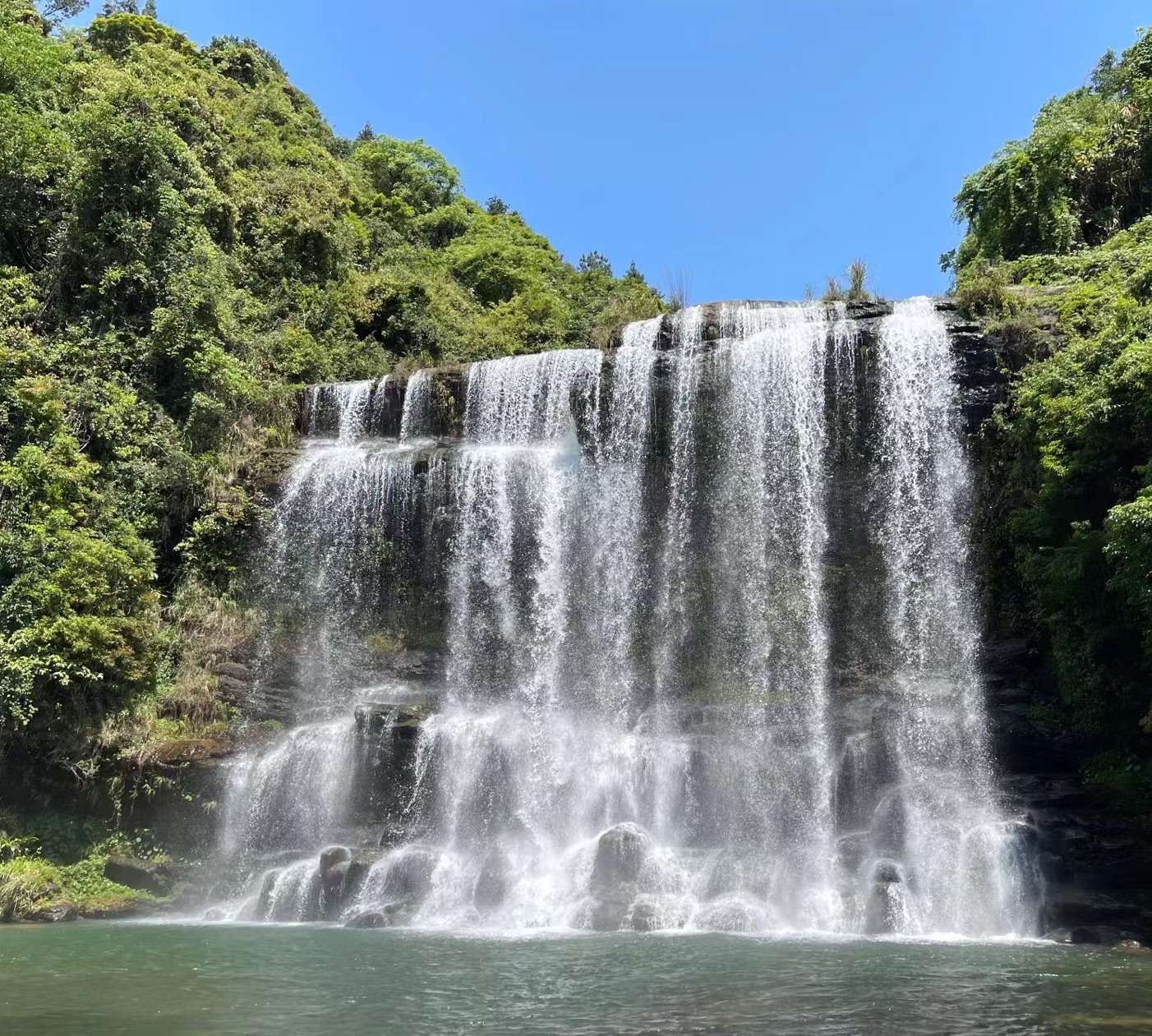
Huangmaizhai Waterfall

Jiexi County (Chinese: 揭西; pinyin: Jiēxī) is a county of eastern Guangdong province, China. It is under the administration of Jieyang city with a jurisdiction area of 1,279 km^{2} (494 sq mi) and a total population of 674,829 according to the 2020 census. Amongst them, 209,233 are downtown residents.

Immigrants from Jiexi form a large overseas Chinese population who speak the Hepo dialect of Hakka (70%), mainly in Sarawak, Johor and Negeri Sembilan (Malaysia), and Bangka Belitung, Sumatra (Indonesia). Other people from Jiexi speak the Chaoshan Min (30%). In the late 18th and early 19th century, settlers from Jiexi county formed the Lintian kongsi republic, an autonomous polity named after a temple in Jiexi dedicated to the Lords of the Three Mountains in Jieyang (Chinese: 三山国王祖庙 aka 揭阳霖田祖庙).

Jiexi is home to the Huangmanzhai waterfalls. There are ambitions to make Jiexi County a more attractive tourist destination following investment in 2010.

The Lords of the Three Mountains, also Kings of the Three Mountains) are a triad Taoist deities worshiped in Southern China (mainly Teochew people) and the part of Hakka people in Taiwan. The Three Mountains refer to three mountains in Jiexi County:

- Jin Mountain (巾山) - protected by the Great Lord
- Ming Mountain (明山) - protected by the Second Lord
- Du Mountain (獨山) - protected by the Third Lord

== History ==
The main territory of Jiexi County originally belonged to Jieyang. During the Qin, Han, and Three Kingdoms period, it was under Nanhai Commandery (南海郡). In the sixth year of the Jin dynasty's Xianhe era (晉咸和六年, 331 AD), it came under Dongguan Commandery (東官郡), the predecessor of today's Dongguan (東莞市) and Huizhou (惠州市). In the ninth year of the Eastern Jin Yixi era (東晉義熙九年, 413 AD), it belonged to Haiyang County (海陽縣) under Yian Commandery (義安郡).

By the Sui dynasty (隋朝), in the eleventh year of the Kaihuang era (開皇十一年, 591 AD), it was incorporated into Teochew. In the third year of the Northern Song Xuanhe era (北宋宣和三年, 1121 AD), the area of present‑day Jiexi was placed under Jieyang County (揭陽縣), which was administered by Teochew. In the second year of the Southern Song Shaoxing era (南宋紹興二年, 1132 AD), it was merged into Haiyang again; in the eighth year of Shaoxing (AD1138), Jieyang County was re‑established and remained under Teochew.

In the Yuan dynasty (1279 AD), it belonged to Chaozhou Lu (潮州路). In the second year of the Ming Hongwu era (明朝洪武二年, 1369 AD), it was under Chaozhou Prefecture (潮州府). The Qing dynasty continued the Ming administrative structure, so it remained part of Chaozhou Prefecture.

In the 3rd year of the Republic of China (民國三年, 1914 AD), the main territory of Jiexi was under Jieyang County within the Chao‑Xun Circuit of Guangdong (廣東潮循道), which was administered by Shantou (汕頭). In 1925, it came under the Dongjiang Administrative Committee (東江行政委員會). In 1928, it was placed under the Dongjiang Reconstruction Commission (東江善後委員公署).

In October 1949, after the founding of the People's Republic of China, the main territory of Jiexi remained under Jieyang County, administered by the Chaoshan Commissioner's Office (潮汕專員公署). In 1965, the western part of Jieyang County and parts of Lufeng County (陸豐縣) were separated to form Jiexi County, named for its location west of Jieyang. In December 1991, Jiexi County came under the jurisdiction of Jieyang.

== Geography ==
From both Guangzhou and Hong Kong the county is about 400 kilometres (250 mi) away.

== Climate ==
Climate data for Jiexi, elevation 81 m (266 ft), (1991–2020 normals, extremes 1967–2010)
Month	Jan	Feb	Mar	Apr	May	Jun	Jul	Aug	Sep	Oct	Nov	Dec	Year
Record high °C (°F)	29.8 (85.6)	32.2 (90.0)	33.3 (91.9)	36.4 (97.5)	37.7 (99.9)	38.2 (100.8)	39.2 (102.6)	38.3 (100.9)	37.6 (99.7)	36.0 (96.8)	35.0 (95.0)	30.6 (87.1)	39.2 (102.6)
Mean daily maximum °C (°F)	19.4 (66.9)	20.3 (68.5)	22.6 (72.7)	26.5 (79.7)	29.6 (85.3)	31.6 (88.9)	33.3 (91.9)	33.0 (91.4)	31.9 (89.4)	29.3 (84.7)	25.6 (78.1)	21.1 (70.0)	27.0 (80.6)
Daily mean °C (°F)	13.9 (57.0)	15.2 (59.4)	17.8 (64.0)	21.8 (71.2)	25.1 (77.2)	27.3 (81.1)	28.4 (83.1)	28.0 (82.4)	27.0 (80.6)	24.1 (75.4)	20.2 (68.4)	15.6 (60.1)	22.0 (71.7)
Mean daily minimum °C (°F)	10.3 (50.5)	11.8 (53.2)	14.5 (58.1)	18.5 (65.3)	22.0 (71.6)	24.5 (76.1)	25.2 (77.4)	25.0 (77.0)	23.8 (74.8)	20.4 (68.7)	16.3 (61.3)	11.8 (53.2)	18.7 (65.6)
Record low °C (°F)	−2.4 (27.7)	3.0 (37.4)	3.7 (38.7)	9.4 (48.9)	15.7 (60.3)	19.4 (66.9)	21.0 (69.8)	22.4 (72.3)	17.8 (64.0)	12.8 (55.0)	4.4 (39.9)	−0.5 (31.1)	−2.4 (27.7)
Average precipitation mm (inches)	44.3 (1.74)	57.3 (2.26)	99.7 (3.93)	162.4 (6.39)	236.2 (9.30)	384.0 (15.12)	336.7 (13.26)	370.8 (14.60)	214.4 (8.44)	53.5 (2.11)	39.2 (1.54)	38.1 (1.50)	2,036.6 (80.19)
Average precipitation days (≥ 0.1 mm)	7.2	10.3	13.9	14.7	17.7	20.6	17.8	19.1	12.7	6.2	5.4	6.1	151.7
Average relative humidity (%)	73	76	79	80	81	84	81	82	79	73	73	70	78
Mean monthly sunshine hours	143.0	105.4	97.1	104.9	128.3	148.8	201.5	184.9	178.6	185.9	170.1	158.8	1,807.3
Percentage possible sunshine	42	33	26	27	31	37	49	47	49	52	52	48	41
Source: China Meteorological Administrationall-time record low
