= Dayu Mountains =

Mountains part of the Nanling mountain ranges

The Dayu Mountains (Chinese: 大庾嶺; pinyin: dà-yǔ lǐng) form a mountain range separating the Zhenshui River (浈水, the upper Bei River) of Pearl River System from Zhangshui River (章水, one of source streams of Gan River) of the Yangtze River System. The Dayu are a series of mountains located between Guangdong and Jiangxi Provinces, one of the Five Ranges in the Nanling Ranges. The mountain range generally runs southwest to northeast through Shaoguan of Guangdong and Ganzhou of Jiangxi.
