= Urban areas in China =

This list of the twenty largest urban areas in China by population in 2010 uses data compiled by the OECD based on its methodology to determine economically linked areas of high population density in China it calls "functional urban areas." It is an adaptation of methodology the OECD uses to determine functional urban areas in OECD member countries. Official Chinese city boundaries cover both urban and rural areas and thus do not necessarily represent the true urban population.

| Rank | City | Urban Population (2010, in millions) | Province-level Division | Image |
|---|---|---|---|---|
| 1 | Shanghai | 28.2 | Shanghai | |
| 2 | Shenzhen | 21.7 | Guangdong | |
| 3 | Guangzhou | 21.0 | Guangdong | |
| 4 | Beijing | 19.2 | Beijing | |
| 5 | Wuhan | 12.6 | Hubei | |
| 6 | Tianjin | 11.6 | Tianjin | |
| 7 | Chengdu | 11.3 | Sichuan | |
| 8 | Chongqing | 11.1 | Chongqing | |
| 9 | Hangzhou | 9.3 | Zhejiang | |
| 10 | Nanjing | 8.3 | Jiangsu | |
| 11 | Xi'an | 7.8 | Shaanxi | |
| 12 | Shantou | 7.5 | Guangdong | |
| 13 | Changzhou | 7.3 | Jiangsu | |
| 14 | Shenyang | 7.0 | Liaoning | |
| 15 | Jinan | 6.9 | Shandong | |
| 16 | Harbin | 6.4 | Heilongjiang | |
| 17 | Qingdao | 6.2 | Shandong | |
| 18 | Zhengzhou | 5.8 | Henan | |
| 19 | Wenzhou | 5.3 | Zhejiang | |
| 20 | Nanchang | 4.2 | Jiangxi | |

== See also ==
- List of capitals in China
- List of cities in China
- List of cities in China by population
- List of villages in China
- List of largest cities in the world
