= List of cities in China by population =

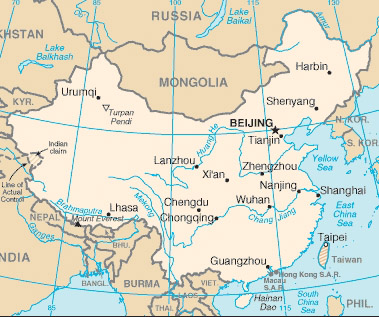
CIA map of China

As of 2023, the five largest cities in China by population are Chongqing (31.91 million), Shanghai (24.87 million), Beijing (21.86 million), Chengdu (21.403 million) and Guangzhou (18.827 million). As of 2024, there are 18 megacities (cities with a population of over 10 million), including Chongqing, Shanghai, Beijing, Chengdu, Guangzhou, Shenzhen, Wuhan, Tianjin, Xi'an, Suzhou, Zhengzhou, Hangzhou, Shijiazhuang, Linyi, Dongguan, Qingdao, Changsha and Hefei.

Among them, the total permanent population of Chongqing, Shanghai, Beijing and Chengdu is above 20 million. Shanghai is China's most populous urban area, while Chongqing is its largest city proper, the only city in China with the largest permanent population of over 30 million.

As of 2021, there were 113 Chinese cities with over 1 million people in urban areas.

== Definition and classification ==
According to the administrative divisions of China, there are three major levels of cities, namely direct-administered municipalities (直辖市), prefecture-level cities (地级市), and county-level cities (县级市). Not included in this administrative classification list are the special administrative regions (特别行政区) of Hong Kong and Macau as well as the cities controlled by the Republic of China. Prefecture-level cities nearly always contain multiple counties (县), county-level cities, and other such sub-divisions.

Municipalities and prefecture-level cities are not each a 'city' in the strictest sense of the term, but are instead an administrative unit typically comprising both the urban core (a city in the strict sense) and surrounding rural or less-urbanized areas. The term "市区" (shì qū; "urban area") is used to distinguish a city's actual urban center from its administratively defined boundaries. However, even this term often encompasses large suburban regions, often greater than 3,000 square kilometres (1,000 sq mi), or sometimes only the urban core, whereas the agglomeration overtakes the city limits. Thus, the "urban core" would be roughly comparable to the American term "city limit", and the "shì qū", or "urban area", would be roughly comparable to a city's "metropolitan area." The municipality is a political designation defining regions under control of a municipal government, which has no comparable designation in America.

While in 2013, Chongqing had the largest population total of any special municipality, 28 million, only 4.5 million of the people were in the actual Chongqing urban area, with the rest of the population in suburban and rural areas.

== List of major cities by population ==
The list contains all the cities with the administrative designation of "national central city" (国家中心城市) and "sub-provincial city" (副省级城市) – including five "cities with independent planning status" (计划单列市) and ten large "provincial capital cities" (省会城市), as well as some large "special economic zones" (经济特区城市), "open coastal cities" (沿海开放城市), and "prefecture-level cities" (地级市), as well as other cities that have a population of over 1 million.

This list defines a city's population as the population of a city's urban population, rather than the entire population of its municipal boundaries.

Legend:

^{⍟} National Capital City

^{#} National Central City

^{*} Provincial Capital City

^{~} Open Coastal City

^{†} Special Economic Zone

Direct-Administered Municipality
City with Independent Planning Status
Sub-Provincial City
Prefecture-Level City

City	Province	2020 Census	2010 Census	% change
Shanghai^{#~}	municipality	21,909,814	20,217,748	+8.37%
Beijing^{⍟#}	municipality	18,960,744	16,704,306	+13.51%
Shenzhen^{†}	Guangdong	17,444,609	10,358,381	+68.41%
Guangzhou^{#*~}	Guangdong	16,096,724	10,641,408	+51.26%
Chengdu^{#*}	Sichuan	13,568,357	7,791,692	+74.14%
Tianjin^{#~}	municipality	11,052,404	9,528,277	+16.00%
Wuhan^{#*}	Hubei	10,494,879	7,541,527	+39.16%
Dongguan	Guangdong	9,644,871	7,271,322	+32.64%
Chongqing^{#}	municipality	9,580,819	6,263,790	+52.96%
Xi'an^{#*}	Shaanxi	9,392,938	5,403,052	+73.85%
Hangzhou^{*}	Zhejiang	9,236,032	5,849,537	+57.89%
Foshan	Guangdong	9,042,509	6,771,895	+33.53%
Nanjing^{*}	Jiangsu	7,519,814	5,827,888	+29.03%
Shenyang^{*}	Liaoning	7,026,358	5,718,232	+22.88%
Zhengzhou^{#*}	Henan	6,461,013	3,677,032	+75.71%
Qingdao^{~}	Shandong	6,165,279	4,556,077	+35.32%
Suzhou	Jiangsu	5,892,892	3,721,700	+58.34%
Jinan^{*}	Shandong	5,648,162	3,641,562	+55.10%
Changsha^{*}	Hunan	5,630,256	3,193,354	+76.31%
Kunming^{*}	Yunnan	5,273,144	3,385,363	+55.76%
Harbin^{*}	Heilongjiang	5,242,897	4,596,313	+14.07%
Shijiazhuang^{*}	Hebei	5,090,440	3,095,219	+64.46%
Hefei^{*}	Anhui	5,055,978	3,098,727	+63.16%
Dalian^{~}	Liaoning	4,913,879	3,902,467	+25.92%
Xiamen^{†}	Fujian	4,617,251	3,119,110	+48.03%
Nanning^{*}	Guangxi	4,582,703	2,660,833	+72.23%
Changchun^{*}	Jilin	4,557,356	3,411,209	+33.60%
Taiyuan^{*}	Shanxi	4,303,673	3,154,157	+36.44%
Guiyang^{*}	Guizhou	4,021,275	2,520,061	+59.57%
Wuxi	Jiangsu	3,956,985	2,757,736	+43.49%
Ürümqi^{*}	Xinjiang	3,842,560	2,853,398	+34.67%
Zhongshan	Guangdong	3,841,873	2,740,994	+40.16%
Shantou^{†}	Guangdong	3,838,900	3,644,017	+5.35%
Ningbo^{~}	Zhejiang	3,731,203	2,583,073	+44.45%
Fuzhou^{*~}	Fujian	3,723,454	3,102,421	+20.02%
Nanchang^{*}	Jiangxi	3,518,975	2,614,380	+34.60%
Changzhou	Jiangsu	3,187,315	2,257,376	+41.20%
Lanzhou^{*}	Gansu	3,012,577	2,438,595	+23.54%
Nantong^{~}	Jiangsu	2,987,600	1,612,385	+85.29%
Huizhou	Guangdong	2,900,113	1,807,858	+60.42%
Xuzhou	Jiangsu	2,845,552	2,214,795	+28.48%
Zibo	Shandong	2,750,312	2,261,717	+21.60%
Linyi	Shandong	2,743,843	1,522,488	+80.22%
Wenzhou^{~}	Zhejiang	2,582,017	2,686,825	−3.90%
Tangshan	Hebei	2,549,968	2,128,191	+19.82%
Hohhot^{*}	Inner Mongolia	2,373,399	1,497,110	+58.53%
Haikou^{*}	Hainan	2,349,239	1,517,410	+54.82%
Shaoxing	Zhejiang	2,333,080	1,725,726	+35.19%
Yantai^{~}	Shandong	2,311,885	1,797,861	+28.59%
Luoyang	Henan	2,230,661	1,584,463	+40.78%
Zhuhai	Guangdong	2,207,090	1,369,538	+61.16%
Liuzhou	Guangxi	2,204,841	1,410,712	+56.29%
Baotou	Inner Mongolia	2,104,114	1,874,323	+12.26%
Handan	Hebei	2,095,134	1,540,827	+35.97%
Yangzhou	Jiangsu	2,067,254	1,584,237	+30.49%
Weifang	Shandong	1,998,405	1,161,582	+72.04%
Baoding	Hebei	1,940,384	1,397,350	+38.86%
Datong	Shanxi	1,809,505	1,420,467	+27.39%
Huai'an	Jiangsu	1,804,611	1,523,655	+18.44%
Jiangmen	Guangdong	1,795,459	1,480,023	+21.31%
Ganzhou	Jiangxi	1,778,132	1,035,911	+71.65%
Jining	Shandong	1,700,054	1,327,483	+28.07%
Xiangyang	Hubei	1,686,403	1,433,057	+17.68%
Xining^{*}	Qinghai	1,677,177	1,227,209	+36.67%
Zunyi	Guizhou	1,675,245	995,311	+68.31%
Yinchuan^{*}	Ningxia	1,662,968	1,159,457	+43.43%
Kunshan	Jiangsu	1,652,159	1,118,617	+47.70%
Daqing	Heilongjiang	1,604,027	1,433,698	+11.88%
Wuhu	Anhui	1,598,165	1,108,087	+44.23%
Mianyang	Sichuan	1,549,499	1,063,272	+45.73%
Putian	Fujian	1,539,389	1,107,199	+39.03%
Qinhuangdao	Hebei	1,520,199	1,088,587	+39.65%
Zhuzhou	Hunan	1,510,148	1,093,730	+38.07%
Jilin	Jilin	1,509,292	1,469,722	+2.69%
Taizhou	Zhejiang	1,485,502	1,189,276	+24.91%
Yiwu	Zhejiang	1,481,384	878,903	+68.55%
Xingtai	Hebei	1,480,754	1,060,749	+39.60%
Anshan	Liaoning	1,480,332	1,504,996	−1.64%
Quanzhou	Fujian	1,469,157	1,154,731	+27.23%
Cixi	Zhejiang	1,457,510	1,059,942	+37.51%
Tai'an	Shandong	1,416,591	1,123,541	+26.08%
Jinjiang	Fujian	1,416,151	1,172,827	+20.75%
Nanyang	Henan	1,407,616	899,899	+56.42%
Zhanjiang	Guangdong	1,400,709	1,038,762	+34.84%
Guilin	Guangxi	1,361,244	963,629	+41.26%
Yancheng	Jiangsu	1,353,475	1,136,826	+19.06%
Zaozhuang	Shandong	1,349,883	980,893	+37.62%
Taizhou	Jiangsu	1,348,327	1,053,601	+27.97%
Shangrao	Jiangxi	1,342,220	885,740	+51.54%
Weihai	Shandong	1,339,645	1,009,491	+32.70%
Zhangjiakou	Hebei	1,339,384	1,180,667	+13.44%
Jiangyin	Jiangsu	1,331,352	1,013,670	+31.34%
Maoming	Guangdong	1,307,802	1,033,196	+26.58%
Heze	Shandong	1,293,767	725,673	+78.29%
Yichang	Hubei	1,284,305	1,049,363	+22.39%
Xinxiang	Henan	1,271,350	918,078	+38.48%
Huainan	Anhui	1,255,619	1,238,488	+1.38%
Nanchong	Sichuan	1,254,455	890,402	+40.89%
Chaozhou	Guangdong	1,254,007	1,256,268	−0.18%
Jieyang	Guangdong	1,242,906	1,226,848	+1.31%
Changshu	Jiangsu	1,230,599	929,124	+32.45%
Fushun	Liaoning	1,228,890	1,318,808	−6.82%
Qingyuan	Guangdong	1,197,581	916,453	+30.68%
Kaifeng	Henan	1,193,802	894,142	+33.51%
Xianyang	Shaanxi	1,192,776	730,704	+63.24%
Fuyang	Anhui	1,191,810	780,522	+52.69%
Jiaxing	Zhejiang	1,188,321	762,643	+55.82%
Anyang	Henan	1,187,772	908,129	+30.79%
Hengyang	Hunan	1,185,130	1,055,964	+12.23%
Rizhao	Shandong	1,147,175	902,272	+27.14%
Dazhou	Sichuan	1,135,817	678,690	+67.35%
Luzhou	Sichuan	1,128,479	742,274	+52.03%
Yueyang	Hunan	1,125,448	924,099	+21.79%
Zhenjiang	Jiangsu	1,123,813	950,516	+18.23%
Baoji	Shaanxi	1,107,702	871,940	+27.04%
Yibin	Sichuan	1,100,737	708,447	+55.37%
Changde	Hunan	1,100,719	846,308	+30.06%
Chifeng	Inner Mongolia	1,093,068	902,285	+21.14%
Huzhou	Zhejiang	1,083,953	748,471	+44.82%
Suqian	Jiangsu	1,081,559	783,376	+38.06%
Wanzhou District	Chongqing municipality	1,078,149	859,662	+25.42%
Bengbu	Anhui	1,077,704	793,866	+35.75%
Lianyungang	Jiangsu	1,071,019	897,393	+19.35%
Lu'an	Anhui	1,069,940	661,217	+61.81%
Zhangjiagang	Jiangsu	1,055,893	762,625	+38.46%
Changzhi	Shanxi	1,047,461	848,227	+23.49%
Pingdingshan	Henan	1,045,966	813,020	+28.65%
Jinhua	Zhejiang	1,040,948	710,597	+46.49%
Zhaoqing	Guangdong	1,035,810	784,642	+32.01%
Shangqiu	Henan	1,031,123	618,549	+66.70%
Qiqihar	Heilongjiang	1,029,522	1,033,174	−0.35%
Jinzhou	Liaoning	1,021,478	946,098	+7.97%
Liaocheng	Shandong	1,020,430	606,366	+68.29%
Xinyang	Henan	1,014,843	625,302	+62.30%
Yuyao	Zhejiang	1,013,866	672,909	+50.67%
Rui'an	Zhejiang	1,012,731	927,383	+9.20%

== Map of the 50 most populous cities ==
Top 50 most populous cities in mainland China

== List of cities with a population between 100,000 and 1,000,000 ==
This list includes all cities with a population between 100,000 and 1,000,000. Many of these cities are prefecture-level cities, sub-prefectural or county-level cities, or any distinct urban area within a city or region. This list defines a city's population as the population of a city's urban area, rather than the entire population of its municipal boundaries. (This list is still a work in progress and only includes certain provinces' cities so far).

City	Province-level division	2020 Census	2010 Census	% change
Puning	Guangdong	935,668	874,954	+6.94%
Guigang	Guangxi	921,440	658,887	+39.85%
Langfang	Hebei	886,490	530,840	+67.00%
Hengshui	Hebei	885,468	554,810	+59.60%
Yangjiang	Guangdong	859,595	692,540	+24.12%
Jiangjin	Chongqing	817,888	686,189	+19.19%
Yongchuan	Chongqing	803,458	582,769	+37.87%
Shaoguan	Guangdong	803,375	726,267	+10.62%
Fuling	Chongqing	801,151	595,224	+34.60%
Hechuan	Chongqing	795,780	721,753	+10.26%
Sanhe	Hebei	760,107	386,902	+96.46%
Cangzhou	Hebei	759,403	499,411	+52.06%
Fuqing	Fujian	744,774	470,824	+58.19%
Sanya	Hainan	724,854	453,819	+59.72%
Boluo	Guangdong	712,593	471,902	+51.00%
Jiamusi	Heilongjiang	698,557	631,357	+10.64%
Meizhou	Guangdong	694,495	612,551	+13.38%
Ordos City	Inner Mongolia	671,048	510,242	+31.52%
Heyuan	Guangdong	662,950	450,953	+47.01%
Guiping	Guangxi	652,210	508,212	+28.33%
Beihai	Guangxi	651,091	431,285	+50.97%
Tongliao	Inner Mongolia	647,938	540,338	+19.91%
Huidong	Guangdong	640,377	473,147	+35.34%
Yanji	Jilin	630,612	505,516	+24.75%
Jixi	Heilongjiang	626,019	746,889	−16.18%
Kaizhou	Chongqing	608,485	416,415	+46.12%
Chengde	Hebei	604,354	484,027	+24.86%
Bobai	Guangxi	599,279	367,495	+63.07%
Hui'an	Fujian	584,053	465,638	+25.43%
Dingzhou	Hebei	577,440	482,121	+19.77%
Beiliu	Guangxi	573,761	652,853	−12.11%
Lhasa	Tibet	568,927	220,252	+158.31%
Hezhou	Guangxi	560,686	379,889	+47.59%
Songyuan	Jilin	551,749	464,999	+18.66%
Lufeng	Guangdong	545,474	579,527	−5.88%
Haifeng	Guangdong	537,278	489,304	+9.80%
Bishan	Chongqing	535,680	246,425	+117.38%
Binyang	Guangxi	531,511	315,875	+68.27%
Wuhai	Inner Mongolia	530,877	502,704	+5.60%
Hegang	Heilongjiang	514,826	600,941	−14.33%
Dazu	Chongqing	505,131	315,183	+60.27%
Qijiang	Chongqing	500,510	328,573	+52.33%
Anxi	Fujian	498,061	336,073	+48.20%
Yunyang	Chongqing	491,309	293,636	+67.32%
Gaozhou	Guangdong	490,301	352,006	+39.29%
Siping	Jilin	485,710	509,107	−4.60%
Changshou	Chongqing	484,331	408,261	+18.63%
Huazhou	Guangdong	472,746	320,418	+47.54%
Qian'an	Hebei	466,210	308,849	+50.95%
Huanghua	Hebei	465,846	296,978	+56.86%
Gaobeidian	Hebei	459,369	274,853	+67.13%
Renqiu	Hebei	458,878	430,896	+6.49%
Bazhou	Hebei	455,923	291,710	+56.29%
Sihui	Guangdong	452,536	355,709	+27.22%
Danzhou	Hainan	452,158	370,000	+22.20%
Lianjiang	Guangdong	443,812	359,225	+23.55%
Huilai	Guangdong	437,430	434,958	+0.57%
Taishan	Guangdong	433,266	394,855	+9.73%
Kaiping	Guangdong	430,035	371,019	+15.91%
Tongliang	Chongqing	423,008	248,962	+69.91%
Shizuishan	Ningxia	422,043	403,901	+4.49%
Xinyi	Guangdong	418,731	333,965	+25.38%
Fangchenggang	Guangxi	416,752	278,955	+49.40%
Bayannur	Inner Mongolia	413,117	354,507	+16.53%
Leizhou	Guangdong	412,291	344,043	+19.84%
Tonghua	Jilin	408,403	476,792	−14.34%
Liaoyuan	Jilin	407,296	385,049	+5.78%
Tongnan	Chongqing	401,323	247,084	+62.42%
Wuzhong	Ningxia	400,677	232,134	+72.61%
Rongchang	Chongqing	400,527	271,232	+47.67%
Yingde	Guangdong	398,066	346,927	+14.74%
Cenxi	Guangxi	397,639	337,052	+17.98%
Fu'an	Fujian	397,068	326,019	+21.79%
Raoping	Guangdong	394,636	418,709	−5.75%
Ulanqab	Inner Mongolia	394,269	319,723	+23.32%
Lingshan	Guangxi	391,284	248,437	+57.50%
Baishan	Jilin	391,234	503,287	−22.26%
Wuchuan	Guangdong	388,714	332,672	+16.85%
Gongzhuling	Jilin	384,715	337,851	+13.87%
Yunfu	Guangdong	380,044	298,914	+27.14%
Baicheng	Jilin	372,519	359,492	+3.62%
Hengzhou	Guangxi	372,273	232,183	+60.34%
Fengjie	Chongqing	368,869	269,302	+36.97%
Xingning	Guangdong	365,661	392,000	−6.72%
Binyang	Guangxi	362,779	265,157	+36.82%
Yangchun	Guangdong	360,359	287,391	+25.39%
Hulunbuir	Inner Mongolia	354,442	327,384	+8.26%
Fuding	Fujian	351,341	266,779	+31.70%
Nanchuan	Chongqing	348,987	255,045	+36.83%
Zhongxian	Chongqing	348,004	247,406	+40.66%
Shanwei	Guangdong	345,373	370,608	−6.81%
Ningjin	Hebei	342,341	258,301	+32.54%
Gu'an	Hebei	342,159	171,558	+99.44%
Wenchang	Hainan	341,862	251,795	+35.77%
Baise	Guangxi	337,516	185,497	+81.95%
Heshan	Guangdong	334,432	282,580	+18.35%
Wuhua	Guangdong	331,583	245,631	+34.99%
Fengfengkuang	Hebei	327,532	397,379	−17.58%
Xilinhot	Inner Mongolia	327,112	214,382	+52.58%
Lianjiang	Fujian	323,972	197,677	+63.89%
Liangping	Chongqing	323,483	235,753	+37.21%
Acheng	Heilongjiang	322,530	336,741	−4.22%
Dianjiang	Chongqing	320,460	241,424	+32.74%
Ulanhot	Inner Mongolia	318,009	276,406	+15.05%
Daming	Hebei	317,877	219,453	+44.85%
Luoding	Guangdong	317,060	263,338	+20.40%
Hepu	Guangxi	305,822	264,530	+15.61%
Caofeidian	Hebei	301,242	109,126	+176.05%
Chengmai	Hainan	300,915	184,266	+63.30%
Hejian	Hebei	296,820	243,458	+21.92%
Meihekou	Jilin	291,138	268,259	+8.53%
Linzhang	Hebei	290,955	194,110	+49.89%
Suixi	Guangdong	289,536	252,792	+14.54%
Qianjiang	Chongqing	288,462	173,997	+65.79%
Luanzhou	Hebei	278,807	208,212	+33.91%
Fengdu	Chongqing	274,294	224,003	+22.45%
Hechi	Guangxi	268,122	197,858	+35.51%
Guyuan	Ningxia	267,810	130,155	+105.76%
Chongzuo	Guangxi	265,077	113,539	+133.47%
Botou	Hebei	264,187	258,203	+2.32%
Qionghai	Hainan	262,524	194,400	+35.04%
Dehua	Fujian	259,496	193,120	+34.37%
Dongfang	Hainan	257,936	153,726	+67.79%
Youyang	Chongqing	256,260	137,635	+86.19%
Pengshui	Chongqing	256,007	137,409	+86.31%
Fengshun	Guangdong	254,264	207,417	+22.59%
Qinghe	Hebei	254,224	168,740	+50.66%
Yushu	Jilin	253,344	280,961	−9.83%
Quyang	Hebei	253,213	124,237	+103.81%
Enping	Guangdong	251,742	244,257	+3.06%
Jungar	Inner Mongolia	250,568	211,331	+18.57%
Zhongwei	Ningxia	249,307	160,279	+55.55%
Du'an	Guangxi	245,021	83,348	+193.97%
Quzhou	Hebei	244,750	113,309	+116.00%
Dunhua	Jilin	241,929	293,396	−17.54%
Laoting	Hebei	240,945	154,632	+55.82%
Fujin	Heilongjiang	240,925	215,237	+11.93%
Yakeshi	Inner Mongolia	239,742	338,275	−29.13%
Xuwen	Guangdong	238,402	238,246	+0.07%
Jinzhou	Hebei	238,153	160,284	+48.58%
Luannan	Hebei	237,640	198,167	+19.92%
Cixian	Hebei	235,811	200,501	+17.61%
Manzhouli	Inner Mongolia	234,932	248,420	−5.43%
Lixian	Hebei	231,467	164,230	+40.94%
Dingxing	Hebei	230,023	121,080	+89.98%
Pingquan	Hebei	228,261	136,401	+67.35%
Changli	Hebei	227,270	150,886	+50.62%
Qingxian	Hebei	226,363	176,612	+28.17%
Jian'ou	Fujian	226,100	192,557	+17.42%
Wanning	Hainan	225,608	221,263	+1.96%
Shizhu	Chongqing	225,190	134,173	+67.84%
Xiushan	Chongqing	224,955	150,566	+49.41%
Jiutai	Jilin	224,442	198,851	+12.87%
Helan	Ningxia	222,070	83,382	+166.33%
Huaiji	Guangdong	221,882	161,544	+37.35%
Pingshan	Hebei	219,902	131,550	+67.16%
Jingxian	Hebei	217,383	182,813	+18.91%
Dacheng	Hebei	215,121	171,399	+25.51%
Bei'an	Heilongjiang	213,850	248,471	−13.93%
Longyao	Hebei	212,776	172,669	+23.23%
Changting	Fujian	212,617	161,833	+31.38%
Huailai	Hebei	211,641	136,843	+54.66%
Lingao	Hainan	210,779	155,595	+35.47%
Lingchuan	Guangxi	210,194	123,534	+70.15%
Jianyang	Fujian	209,876	150,756	+39.22%
Jiexi	Guangdong	209,233	247,236	−15.37%
Yongning	Ningxia	207,698	76,590	+171.18%
Gucheng	Hebei	207,499	158,697	+30.75%
Zijin	Guangdong	207,394	231,072	−10.25%
Dalad	Inner Mongolia	207,102	204,300	+1.37%
Datong	Qinghai	205,729	144,484	+42.39%
Dehui	Jilin	202,988	187,956	+8.00%
Lingwu	Ningxia	200,920	125,976	+59.49%
Wushan	Chongqing	200,671	148,597	+35.04%
Qianxi	Hebei	200,036	160,113	+24.93%
Lechang	Guangdong	199,438	191,457	+4.17%
Longchuan	Guangdong	197,714	190,368	+3.86%
Golmud	Qinghai	197,153	186,341	+5.80%
Nong'an	Jilin	196,832	179,184	+9.85%
Anda	Heilongjiang	196,645	223,486	−12.01%
Lishu	Jilin	193,144	254,842	−24.21%
Fusui	Guangxi	192,689	127,371	+51.28%
Anping	Hebei	191,624	114,678	+67.10%
Anguo	Hebei	189,925	135,524	+40.14%
Yangxi	Guangdong	189,866	153,771	+23.47%
Hunchun	Jilin	189,760	174,355	+8.84%
Heihe	Heilongjiang	189,471	147,042	+28.86%
Feixiang	Hebei	188,215	82,244	+128.85%
Ejin Horo	Inner Mongolia	187,774	144,135	+30.28%
Wansheng	Chongqing	187,007	185,382	+0.88%
Anxin	Hebei	186,713	167,433	+11.52%
Xinxing	Guangdong	185,930	160,209	+16.05%
Fusong	Jilin	185,588	218,680	−15.13%
Huadian	Jilin	184,810	193,537	−4.51%
Hulin	Heilongjiang	184,294	193,028	−4.52%
Nangong	Hebei	183,450	188,260	−2.55%
Cheng'an	Hebei	181,879	138,137	+31.67%
Hailin	Heilongjiang	180,669	216,633	−16.60%
Pingxiang	Hebei	177,125	93,711	+89.01%
Shulan	Jilin	176,692	254,850	−30.67%
Lianzhou	Guangdong	176,572	161,667	+9.22%
Wulong	Chongqing	175,838	115,823	+51.82%
Zalantun	Inner Mongolia	174,049	167,493	+3.91%
Nanxiong	Guangdong	171,215	140,017	+22.28%
Dongguang	Hebei	170,863	147,857	+15.56%
Fularji	Heilongjiang	170,169	336,741	−49.47%
Jiaohe	Jilin	168,313	201,712	−16.56%
Alxa	Inner Mongolia	167,103	129,242	+29.29%
Hailun	Heilongjiang	164,766	188,461	−12.57%
Guangning	Guangdong	164,249	156,304	+5.08%
Zhongning	Ningxia	163,702	106,745	+53.36%
Panshi	Jilin	163,592	228,004	−28.25%
Laishui	Hebei	163,459	99,998	+63.46%
Pingluo	Ningxia	163,459	94,095	+73.72%
Laiyuan	Hebei	162,973	77,610	+109.99%
Binxian	Heilongjiang	162,735	146,031	+11.44%
Datian	Fujian	162,066	133,659	+21.25%
Qian Gorlos	Jilin	160,878	171,908	−6.42%
Gutian	Fujian	160,506	110,224	+45.62%
Yunan	Guangdong	160,255	152,342	+5.19%
Shuangyang	Jilin	159,392	129,699	+22.89%
Lingshui	Hainan	158,159	118,176	+33.83%
Guantao	Hebei	157,033	114,624	+37.00%
Wuxi	Chongqing	156,732	105,111	+49.11%
Baoqing	Heilongjiang	156,506	149,147	+4.93%
Dongxing	Guangxi	155,538	92,267	+68.57%
Dabu	Guangdong	154,719	161,014	−3.91%
Yangshan	Guangdong	154,401	125,246	+23.28%
Ningcheng	Inner Mongolia	153,827	117,976	+30.39%
Liucheng	Guangxi	151,595	121,395	+24.88%
Jingxi	Guangxi	150,456	92,786	+62.15%
Fengning	Hebei	148,332	99,355	+49.29%
Gaoyang	Hebei	148,172	100,486	+47.46%
Lipu	Guangxi	146,753	134,908	+8.78%
Shuangliao	Jilin	146,716	180,700	−18.81%
Chengde	Hebei	146,317	101,121	+44.69%
Longmen	Guangdong	146,193	90,831	+60.95%
Rongcheng	Hebei	145,215	99,048	+46.61%
Ledong	Hainan	145,063	132,625	+9.38%
Aohan	Inner Mongolia	144,417	118,673	+21.69%
Julu	Hebei	142,982	127,344	+12.28%
Qingtongxia	Ningxia	142,349	99,367	+43.26%
Lingshou	Hebei	142,289	89,340	+59.27%
Dongshan	Fujian	141,511	102,791	+37.67%
Jize	Hebei	141,302	76,598	+84.47%
Guangping	Hebei	141,156	74,967	+88.29%
Jalaid	Inner Mongolia	141,147	122,741	+15.00%
Linxi	Hebei	141,043	119,056	+18.47%
Changjiang	Hainan	140,954	106,960	+31.78%
Kuancheng	Hebei	140,890	86,762	+62.39%
Tongxin	Ningxia	140,077	104,261	+34.35%
Longhua	Hebei	138,768	96,253	+44.17%
Nanpi	Hebei	137,293	94,508	+45.27%
Da'an	Jilin	136,823	202,322	−32.37%
Fogang	Guangdong	136,789	118,429	+15.50%
Urad Front	Inner Mongolia	136,352	106,495	+28.04%
Qinglong	Hebei	135,890	114,643	+18.53%
Bayan	Heilongjiang	135,099	143,909	−6.12%
Dahua	Guangxi	134,949	113,539	+18.86%
Jiagedaqi	Heilongjiang	133,790	142,465	−6.09%
Luhe	Guangdong	133,178	150,902	−11.75%
Jingxing	Hebei	132,756	91,804	+44.61%
Minhe	Qinghai	131,715	80,600	+63.42%
Naiman	Inner Mongolia	131,429	110,318	+19.14%
Holingol	Inner Mongolia	130,239	101,496	+28.32%
Luanping	Hebei	129,894	79,856	+62.66%
Oroqen	Inner Mongolia	128,919	151,156	−14.71%
Otog	Inner Mongolia	128,829	119,423	+7.88%
Fucheng	Hebei	128,484	93,672	+37.16%
Ongniud	Inner Mongolia	127,237	123,532	+3.00%
Changling	Jilin	125,129	198,717	−37.03%
Cangxian	Hebei	125,085	107,692	+16.15%
Ledu	Qinghai	125,048	69,939	+78.80%
Fuyu	Jilin	124,874	164,673	−24.17%
Arun	Inner Mongolia	124,589	83,098	+49.93%
Liancheng	Fujian	124,550	82,974	+50.11%
Fengkai	Guangdong	124,170	116,798	+6.31%
Huinan	Jilin	123,574	172,792	−28.48%
Lulong	Hebei	123,352	65,371	+88.70%
Kailu	Inner Mongolia	123,077	111,502	+10.38%
Fengzhen	Inner Mongolia	122,193	123,811	−1.31%
Huzhu	Qinghai	122,069	57,489	+112.33%
Horqin Left Middle	Inner Mongolia	119,166	148,310	−19.65%
Jarud	Inner Mongolia	118,424	92,510	+28.01%
Haiyuan	Ningxia	117,462	51,815	+126.69%
Tumed Right	Inner Mongolia	116,238	108,200	+7.43%
Neiqiu	Hebei	115,960	84,416	+37.37%
Taonan	Jilin	115,946	164,976	−29.72%
Ding'an	Hainan	115,856	104,960	+10.38%
Heping	Guangdong	115,301	103,233	+11.69%
Wengyuan	Guangdong	114,951	103,372	+11.20%
Tunchang	Hainan	114,523	100,684	+13.74%
Wangqing	Jilin	114,193	155,514	−26.57%
Huanan	Heilongjiang	114,107	134,270	−15.02%
Hanggin Rear	Inner Mongolia	114,058	82,225	+38.71%
Fuchuan	Guangxi	113,719	72,087	+57.75%
Boye	Hebei	113,588	74,534	+52.40%
Tongyu	Jilin	113,347	131,624	−13.89%
Dongfeng	Jilin	112,665	129,020	−12.68%
Qiuxian	Hebei	112,644	82,214	+37.01%
Wuyuan	Inner Mongolia	112,379	119,330	−5.83%
Huanjiang	Guangxi	111,118	67,292	+65.13%
Yitong	Jilin	110,229	124,604	−11.54%
Linxi	Inner Mongolia	109,890	99,301	+10.66%
Bairin	Inner Mongolia	109,060	90,259	+20.83%
Dachang	Hebei	109,011	50,722	+114.92%
Ewenki	Inner Mongolia	108,893	109,665	−0.70%
Harqin	Inner Mongolia	107,771	92,372	+16.67%
Ar Horqin	Inner Mongolia	107,140	79,430	+34.89%
Horqin Left Back	Inner Mongolia	106,278	107,530	−1.16%
Boli	Heilongjiang	106,061	119,659	−11.36%
Zhenlai	Jilin	105,997	125,088	−15.26%
Tumed Left	Inner Mongolia	105,947	88,477	+19.75%
Lianping	Guangdong	105,906	110,851	−4.46%
Antu	Jilin	104,649	124,927	−16.23%
Mengcun	Hebei	104,220	85,885	+21.35%
Liuhe	Jilin	102,743	114,123	−9.97%
Fuyu	Heilongjiang	102,726	108,929	−5.69%
Xinfeng	Guangdong	102,680	99,897	+2.79%
Guangzong	Hebei	102,448	59,009	+73.61%
Daxin	Guangxi	101,841	58,829	+73.11%
Jiaoling	Guangdong	101,777	98,287	+3.55%
Gaoyi	Hebei	100,414	47,020	+113.56%
Fuping	Hebei	100,321	40,330	+148.75%
Chicheng	Hebei	100,137	62,616	+59.92%

== Cities by urban population ==
Largest cities by urban population (2020–2021)
City	Urban population
Shanghai	29,867,918
Beijing	21,893,095
Guangzhou	18,810,600
Chengdu	16,935,567
Chongqing	16,875,000
Shenzhen	14,678,000
Tianjin	13,866,009
Wuhan	12,326,500
Xi'an	11,904,805
Hangzhou	10,711,238
Dongguan	10,466,625
Foshan	9,498,863
Nanjing	9,314,685
Jinan	8,352,574
Shenyang	7,885,142
Qingdao	7,172,451
Harbin	6,976,136
Zhengzhou	6,650,532
Changsha	5,980,707
Kunming	5,950,578
Dalian	5,736,383
Changchun	5,691,024
Xiamen	5,163,970
Ningbo	5,057,140
Taiyuan	4,529,141
Zhongshan	4,418,060
Ürümqi	4,335,017
Suzhou	4,330,000
Shantou	4,312,192
Hefei	4,216,940
Shijiazhuang	4,098,243
Fuzhou	4,094,491
Nanning	3,839,800
Wenzhou	3,604,446
Changzhou	3,601,079
Nanchang	3,576,547
Guiyang	3,483,100
Tangshan	3,399,231
Wuxi	3,256,000
Lanzhou	3,072,100
Handan	2,845,790
Hohhot	2,681,758
Weifang	2,659,938
Jiangmen	2,657,662
Zibo	2,640,000
Huai'an	2,632,788
Xuzhou	2,623,066
Maoming	2,539,148
Shaoxing	2,521,964
Yantai	2,511,053
Huizhou	2,509,243
Zhuhai	2,439,585
Luoyang	2,372,571
Linyi	2,303,648
Nantong	2,273,326
Haikou	2,250,000
Baotou	2,181,077
Liuzhou	2,153,419
Datong	2,030,203
Putian	2,003,000
Lianyungang	2,001,009
Baoding	1,976,000
Xining	1,954,795
Zhanjiang	1,931,455
Wuhu	1,870,000
Shangqiu	1,859,723
Chaozhou	1,750,945
Qingyuan	1,738,424
Kaifeng	1,735,581
Tai'an	1,735,425
Yichang	1,698,400
Yangzhou	1,665,000
Yinchuan	1,662,968
Xiangyang	1,658,000
Anshan	1,647,000
Jilin City	1,623,000
Yancheng	1,615,717
Taizhou	1,607,108
Qinhuangdao	1,586,000
Ganzhou	1,585,000
Daqing	1,574,389
Guilin	1,572,300
Huzhou	1,558,826
Zhaoqing	1,553,109
Jiaxing	1,518,654
Jining	1,518,000
Jinhua	1,463,990
Changde	1,457,519
Hengyang	1,453,000
Suqian	1,440,000
Baoji	1,437,802
Zhangjiakou	1,435,000
Mianyang	1,355,331
Qiqihar	1,350,434
Heze	1,346,717
Fushun	1,307,200
Yangjiang	1,292,987
Liaocheng	1,229,768
Tianshui	1,212,791
Benxi	1,176,490
Chifeng	1,175,391
Jiujiang	1,164,268
Anyang	1,146,839
Huaibei	1,142,000
Yulin	1,117,800
Xinxiang	1,047,088
Shaoguan	1,028,460
Dongying	998,968
Luzhou	998,900
Meizhou	992,351
Leshan	987,000
Dezhou	986,192
Xingtai	971,300
Chenzhou	960,000
Mudanjiang	930,105
Tongliao	921,808
Chengde	920,395
Laiwu	907,839
Taishan	907,354
Quzhou	902,767
Zhoushan	882,932
Suihua	877,114
Langfang	868,066
Hengshui	856,705
Yingkou	848,100
Panjin	846,500
Weihai	844,310
Anqing	804,493
Liaoyang	793,700
Puyang	760,300
Fuxin	759,100
Jieyang	741,674
Yangquan	731,228
Jiamusi	726,622
Huludao	724,800
Zhumadian	721,670
Kashgar	711,300
Dazhou	705,321
Heyuan	703,607
Longyan	703,524
Aksu City	695,000
Ordos City	693,038
Hegang	690,000
Binzhou	682,717
Siping	680,600
Sanmenxia	669,307
Dandong	659,400
Suining	658,798
Sanya	644,727
Ji'an	643,399
Cangzhou	621,300
Qitaihe	620,935
Yichun	598,000
Tonghua	584,209
Jixi	580,000
Korla	549,324
Chaoyang	537,800
Dingxi	525,044
Shuangyashan	507,257
Songyuan	495,900
Nanping	491,287
Liaoyuan	475,400
Lhasa	464,736
Karamay	462,347
Shanwei	437,000
Tieling	434,799
Suihua	428,795
Ulanqab	425,059
Hami	412,305
Huangshan City	410,973
Hotan	408,894
Wuwei	408,000
Baishan	402,600
Sanming	379,701
Yunfu	369,321
Hailar	365,012
Zhaotong	352,831
Ningde	343,262
Baicheng	332,826
Hunchun	271,000
Zhangjiajie	225,700
Golmud	205,700
Yumen City	168,300
Altay City	114,995

== See also ==
- List of capitals in China
- List of cities in China
- List of largest cities in the world
- List of urban areas in China
- List of villages in China
