= Kucheng =

Kucheng may refer to:

- Guzheng, a traditional Chinese musical instrument
- Gucheng (disambiguation), numerous places in China
- Gutian County, a county in Fujian, China
