= List of cities in China =

City (shi)

Chinese name
- Simplified Chinese: 市
- Traditional Chinese: 市
Transcriptions
Standard Mandarin
- Hanyu Pinyin: Shì
other Mandarin
- Xiao'erjing: شِـ

Tibetan name
- Tibetan: གྲོང་ཁྱེར།
Transcriptions
- Wylie: grong khyer
- Tibetan Pinyin: Chongkyir

Zhuang name
- Zhuang: Si

Korean name
- Hangul: 시
Transcriptions
- Revised Romanization: si
- McCune–Reischauer: si

Mongolian name
- Mongolian Cyrillic: хот
- Mongolian script: ᠬᠣᠲᠠ
Transcriptions
- SASM/GNC: qota

Uyghur name
- Uyghur: شەھەر
Transcriptions
- Latin Yëziqi: Sheher

Manchu name
- Manchu script: ᡥᠣᡨᠣᠨ
- Möllendorff: hoton

Kazakh name
- Kazakh: قالا қала qala

Kyrgyz name
- Kyrgyz: شاار шаар şaar

Daur name
- Daur: hotn

Xibe name
- Xibe: ᡥᠣᡨᠣᠨ hoton

Evenki name
- Evenki: HƟTƟNG

Oroqen name
- Oroqen: kutuun

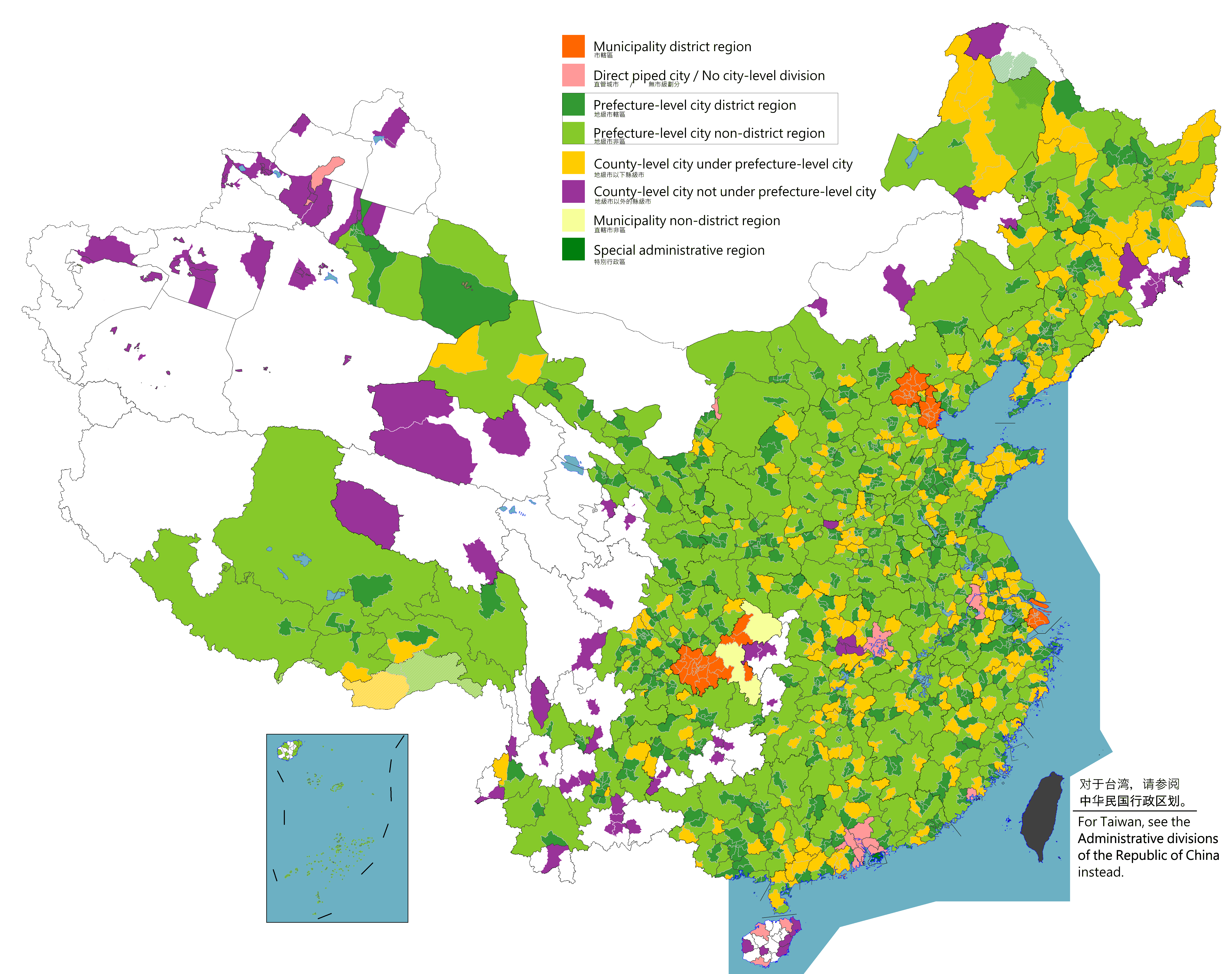
Cities in the People's Republic of China

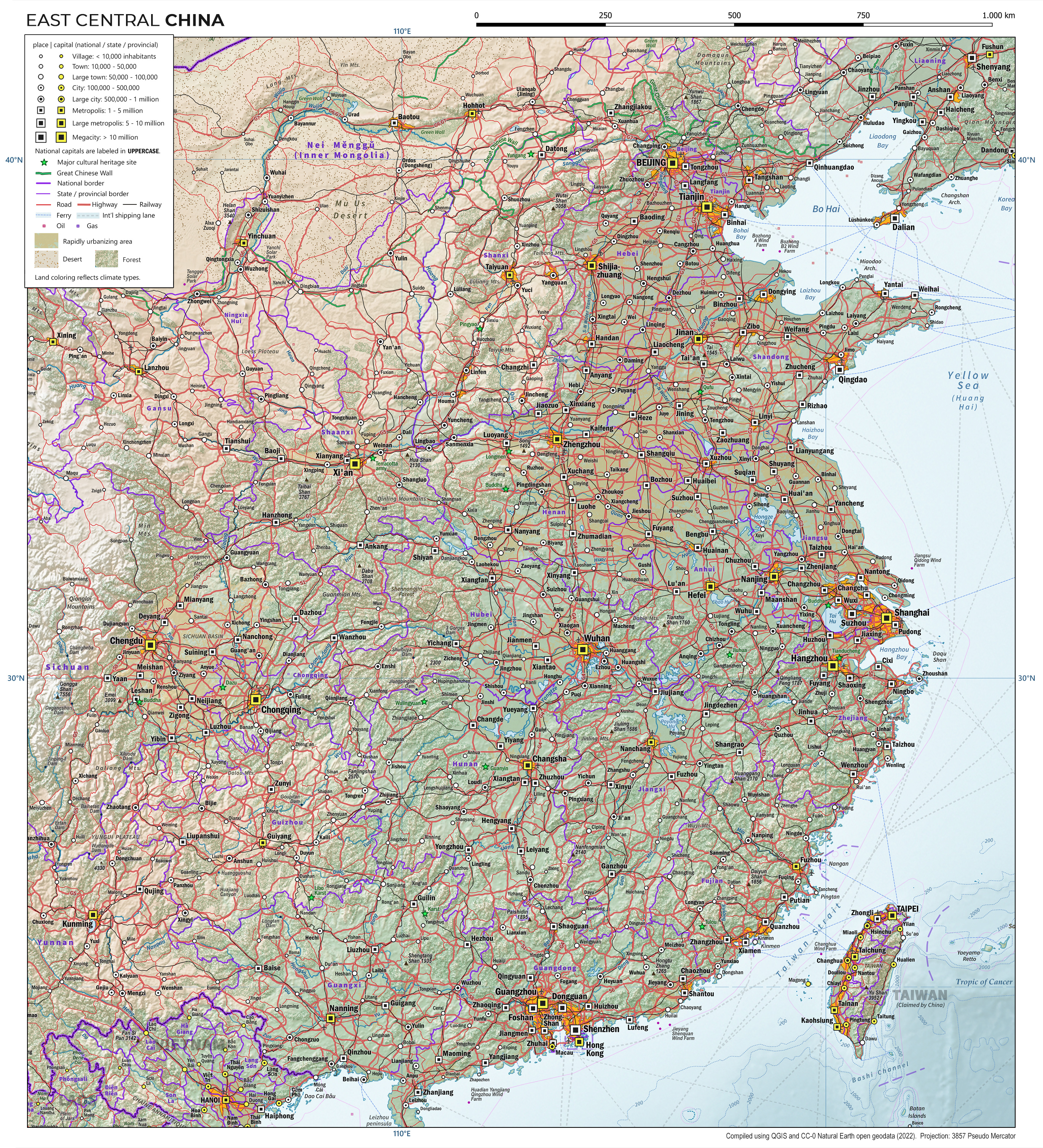
General topographic map of the populous part of China as per 2024, including the population class for each place (click to enlarge)

According to the administrative divisions of the People's Republic of China, there are three levels of cities: provincial-level cities (consisting of directly-administered municipalities and the special administrative regions of Hong Kong and Macau), prefecture-level cities, and county-level cities. As of January 2024, the PRC has a total of 707 cities: 4 municipalities, 2 SARs, 293 prefecture-level cities (including the 15 sub-provincial cities) and 408 county-level cities (including the 38 sub-prefectural cities and 12 XXPC cities). This list does not include any cities in the disputed Taiwan Province and portions of Fujian Province, which are claimed by the PRC under the One China Policy, as these areas are controlled by the Republic of China (see the List of cities in Taiwan).

Prefecture-level cities nearly always contain multiple counties (县), county-level cities, and other such sub-divisions. Because of this, prefecture-level cities often overlap in area with county-level cities.

Four cities are centrally administered municipalities, which include dense urban areas, suburbs, and large rural areas: Chongqing (32.05 million), Shanghai (24.87 million), Beijing (21.89 million), and Tianjin (13.87 million).

In 2024, there were 105 cities governed by the People's Republic of China with an urban population of over 1 million.

== List of cities ==
=== Contemporary cities ===
==== Types of cities ====
Name	Chinese	No.
Provincial-level city division
Direct-administered municipality	直辖市	4
Prefectural-level city divisions
Prefecture-level city Sub-provincial city Ordinary prefectural city	地级市 副省级市 普通地级市	293 15 278
County-level city divisions
County-level city Sub-prefectural city Ordinary county city	县级市 副地级市 普通县级市	397 47 350
Special administrative region
Special administrative region	特别行政区	2

City	Chinese	Province	Prefecture	Founded (PRC)
Hong Kong	香港特别行政區	autonomous	none	1997-07-01
Macau	澳門特别行政區	autonomous	none	1999-12-20
Beijing	北京市	municipal	none	1949-10-01
Chongqing	重庆市	municipal	none	1997-03-14
Shanghai	上海市	municipal	none	1949-10-01
Tianjin	天津市	municipal	none	1967-01-02
Anqing	安庆市	Anhui	direct administration	1979-11-04
Bengbu	蚌埠市	Anhui	direct administration	1949-10-01
Bozhou	亳州市	Anhui	direct administration	2000-05-21
Chaohu	巢湖市	Anhui	Hefei	2011-07-14
Chizhou	池州市	Anhui	direct administration	2000-06-25
Chuzhou	滁州市	Anhui	direct administration	1992-12-20
Fuyang	阜阳市	Anhui	direct administration	1996-01-01
Guangde	广德市	Anhui	Xuancheng	2019-07-12
Hefei	合肥市	Anhui	direct administration	1949-10-01
Huaibei	淮北市	Anhui	direct administration	1960-04-16
Huainan	淮南市	Anhui	direct administration	1951-01-18
Huangshan	黄山市	Anhui	direct administration	1987-11-27
Jieshou	界首市	Anhui	Fuyang	1989-09-27
Lu'an	六安市	Anhui	direct administration	1999-09-02
Ma'anshan	马鞍山市	Anhui	direct administration	1956-10-12
Mingguang	明光市	Anhui	Chuzhou	1994-05-31
Ningguo	宁国市	Anhui	Xuancheng	1997-03-11
Qianshan	潜山市	Anhui	Anqing	2018-07-02
Suzhou	宿州市	Anhui	direct administration	1998-12-06
Tianchang	天长市	Anhui	Chuzhou	1993-09-18
Tongcheng	桐城市	Anhui	Anqing	1996-08-20
Tongling	铜陵市	Anhui	direct administration	1971-12-11
Wuhu	芜湖市	Anhui	direct administration	1972-12-30
Wuwei	无为市	Anhui	Wuhu	2019-11-20
Xuancheng	宣城市	Anhui	direct administration	2000-06-25
Fu'an	福安市	Fujian	Ningde	1989-11-13
Fuding	福鼎市	Fujian	Ningde	1995-10-13
Fuqing	福清市	Fujian	Fuzhou	1990-12-26
Fuzhou	福州市	Fujian	direct administration	1949-10-01
Jian'ou	建瓯市	Fujian	Nanping	1992-10-20
Jinjiang	晋江市	Fujian	Quanzhou	1992-03-06
Longhai	龙海市	Fujian	Zhangzhou	1993-05-12
Longyan	龙岩市	Fujian	direct administration	1996-11-20
Nan'an	南安市	Fujian	Quanzhou	1993-05-12
Nanping	南平市	Fujian	direct administration	1994-09-05
Ningde	宁德市	Fujian	direct administration	1999-11-14
Putian	莆田市	Fujian	direct administration	1983-09-09
Quanzhou	泉州市	Fujian	direct administration	1985-05-14
Sanming	三明市	Fujian	direct administration	1983-04-28
Shaowu	邵武市	Fujian	Nanping	1983-08-17
Shishi	石狮市	Fujian	Quanzhou	1987-12-17
Wuyishan	武夷山市	Fujian	Nanping	1989-08-21
Xiamen	厦门市	Fujian	direct administration	1949-10-01
Yong'an	永安市	Fujian	Sanming	1984-09-12
Zhangping	漳平市	Fujian	Longyan	1990-08-15
Zhangzhou	漳州市	Fujian	direct administration	1985-05-14
Baiyin	白银市	Gansu	direct administration	1985-05-14
Dingxi	定西市	Gansu	direct administration	2003-04-04
Dunhuang	敦煌市	Gansu	Jiuquan	1987-08-21
Hezuo	合作市	Gansu	Gannan	1996-05-28
Huating	华亭市	Gansu	Pingliang	2018-07-02
Jiayuguan	嘉峪关市	Gansu	direct administration	1971-09-10
Jinchang	金昌市	Gansu	direct administration	1981-02-09
Jiuquan	酒泉市	Gansu	direct administration	2002-06-18
Lanzhou	兰州市	Gansu	direct administration	1949-10-01
Linxia	临夏市	Gansu	Linxia	1983-08-31
Longnan	陇南市	Gansu	direct administration	2004-01-11
Pingliang	平凉市	Gansu	direct administration	2002-06-02
Qingyang	庆阳市	Gansu	direct administration	2002-06-22
Tianshui	天水市	Gansu	direct administration	1985-07-08
Wuwei	武威市	Gansu	direct administration	2001-05-09
Yumen	玉门市	Gansu	Jiuquan	1961-11-15
Zhangye	张掖市	Gansu	direct administration	2002-03-01
Chaozhou	潮州市	Guangdong	direct administration	1991-12-07
Dongguan	东莞市	Guangdong	direct administration	1988-01-07
Enping	恩平市	Guangdong	Jiangmen	1994-02-28
Foshan	佛山市	Guangdong	direct administration	1975-11-22
Gaozhou	高州市	Guangdong	Maoming	1993-06-08
Guangzhou	广州市	Guangdong	direct administration	1954-06-19
Heshan	鹤山市	Guangdong	Jiangmen	1993-11-08
Heyuan	河源市	Guangdong	direct administration	1988-01-07
Huazhou	化州市	Guangdong	Maoming	1994-07-04
Huizhou	惠州市	Guangdong	direct administration	1988-01-07
Jiangmen	江门市	Guangdong	direct administration	1975-11-22
Jieyang	揭阳市	Guangdong	direct administration	1991-12-07
Kaiping	开平市	Guangdong	Jiangmen	1993-01-05
Lechang	乐昌市	Guangdong	Shaoguan	1994-04-28
Leizhou	雷州市	Guangdong	Zhanjiang	1994-04-26
Lianjiang	廉江市	Guangdong	Zhanjiang	1993-12-10
Lianzhou	连州市	Guangdong	Qingyuan	1994-04-22
Lufeng	陆丰市	Guangdong	Shanwei	1995-01-19
Luoding	罗定市	Guangdong	Yunfu	1993-04-08
Maoming	茂名市	Guangdong	direct administration	1975-11-22
Meizhou	梅州市	Guangdong	direct administration	1988-01-07
Nanxiong	南雄市	Guangdong	Shaoguan	1996-06-17
Puning	普宁市	Guangdong	Jieyang	1993-04-06
Qingyuan	清远市	Guangdong	direct administration	1988-01-07
Shantou	汕头市	Guangdong	direct administration	1975-11-22
Shanwei	汕尾市	Guangdong	direct administration	1988-01-07
Shaoguan	韶关市	Guangdong	direct administration	1975-11-22
Shenzhen	深圳市	Guangdong	direct administration	1979-03-05
Sihui	四会市	Guangdong	Zhaoqing	1993-11-25
Taishan	台山市	Guangdong	Jiangmen	1992-04-17
Wuchuan	吴川市	Guangdong	Zhanjiang	1994-05-26
Xingning	兴宁市	Guangdong	Meizhou	1994-06-06
Xinyi	信宜市	Guangdong	Maoming	1995-09-11
Yangchun	阳春市	Guangdong	Yangjiang	1994-05-05
Yangjiang	阳江市	Guangdong	direct administration	1988-01-07
Yingde	英德市	Guangdong	Qingyuan	1994-01-12
Yunfu	云浮市	Guangdong	direct administration	1994-04-05
Zhanjiang	湛江市	Guangdong	direct administration	1975-11-22
Zhaoqing	肇庆市	Guangdong	direct administration	1988-01-07
Zhongshan	中山市	Guangdong	direct administration	1988-01-07
Zhuhai	珠海市	Guangdong	direct administration	1979-03-05
Baise	百色市	Guangxi	direct administration	2002-06-02
Beihai	北海市	Guangxi	direct administration	1983-10-08
Beiliu	北流市	Guangxi	Yulin	1994-04-18
Cenxi	岑溪市	Guangxi	Wuzhou	1995-09-11
Chongzuo	崇左市	Guangxi	direct administration	2002-12-23
Dongxing	东兴市	Guangxi	Fangchenggang	1996-04-29
Fangchenggang	防城港市	Guangxi	direct administration	1993-05-23
Guigang	贵港市	Guangxi	direct administration	1995-10-27
Guilin	桂林市	Guangxi	direct administration	1961-11-25
Guiping	桂平市	Guangxi	Guigang	1994-05-18
Hechi	河池市	Guangxi	direct administration	2002-06-18
Hengzhou	横州市	Guangxi	Nanning	2021-02-03
Heshan	合山市	Guangxi	Laibin	1981-06-29
Hezhou	贺州市	Guangxi	direct administration	2002-06-18
Jingxi	靖西市	Guangxi	Baise	2015-08-01
Laibin	来宾市	Guangxi	direct administration	2002-09-29
Lipu	荔浦市	Guangxi	Guilin	2018-07-02
Liuzhou	柳州市	Guangxi	direct administration	1961-11-25
Nanning	南宁市	Guangxi	direct administration	1961-12-23
Pingguo	平果市	Guangxi	Baise	2019-11-20
Pingxiang	凭祥市	Guangxi	Chongzuo	1961-05-27
Qinzhou	钦州市	Guangxi	direct administration	1994-06-28
Wuzhou	梧州市	Guangxi	direct administration	1961-11-25
Yulin	玉林市	Guangxi	direct administration	1997-04-22
Anshun	安顺市	Guizhou	direct administration	2000-06-23
Bijie	毕节市	Guizhou	direct administration	2011-10-22
Chishui	赤水市	Guizhou	Zunyi	1990-09-30
Duyun	都匀市	Guizhou	Qiannan	1966-03-09
Fuquan	福泉市	Guizhou	Qiannan	1996-12-02
Guiyang	贵阳市	Guizhou	direct administration	1949-10-01
Kaili	凯里市	Guizhou	Qiandongnan	1983-08-19
Liupanshui	六盘水市	Guizhou	direct administration	1978-12-18
Panzhou	盘州市	Guizhou	Liupanshui	2017-04-09
Qianxi	黔西市	Guizhou	Bijie	2021-01-20
Qingzhen	清镇市	Guizhou	Guiyang	1992-11-06
Renhuai	仁怀市	Guizhou	Zunyi	1995-11-30
Tongren	铜仁市	Guizhou	direct administration	2011-10-22
Xingren	兴仁市	Guizhou	Qianxinan	2018-07-02
Xingyi	兴义市	Guizhou	Qianxinan	1987-11-06
Zunyi	遵义市	Guizhou	direct administration	1997-06-10
Danzhou	儋州市	Hainan	direct administration	2015-02-19
Dongfang	东方市	Hainan	none	1997-03-12
Haikou	海口市	Hainan	direct administration	1986-05-31
Qionghai	琼海市	Hainan	none	1992-11-06
Sansha	三沙市	Hainan	direct administration	2012-06-21
Sanya	三亚市	Hainan	direct administration	1987-11-20
Wanning	万宁市	Hainan	none	1996-08-05
Wenchang	文昌市	Hainan	none	1995-11-07
Wuzhishan	五指山市	Hainan	none	1986-06-12
Anguo	安国市	Hebei	Baoding	1991-05-06
Baoding	保定市	Hebei	direct administration	1983-11-15
Bazhou	霸州市	Hebei	Langfang	1990-01-04
Botou	泊头市	Hebei	Cangzhou	1982-12-13
Cangzhou	沧州市	Hebei	direct administration	1983-11-15
Chengde	承德市	Hebei	direct administration	1983-11-15
Dingzhou	定州市	Hebei	Baoding	1986-03-05
Gaobeidian	高碑店市	Hebei	Baoding	1993-04-09
Handan	邯郸市	Hebei	direct administration	1983-11-15
Hengshui	衡水市	Hebei	direct administration	1996-05-31
Hejian	河间市	Hebei	Cangzhou	1990-10-18
Huanghua	黄骅市	Hebei	Cangzhou	1989-07-27
Jinzhou	晋州市	Hebei	Shijiazhuang	1991-11-30
Langfang	廊坊市	Hebei	direct administration	1988-09-13
Luanzhou	滦州市	Hebei	Tangshan	2018-07-02
Nangong	南宫市	Hebei	Xingtai	1986-03-05
Pingquan	平泉市	Hebei	Chengde	2017-04-09
Qian'an	迁安市	Hebei	Tangshan	1996-10-10
Qinhuangdao	秦皇岛市	Hebei	direct administration	1983-03-03
Renqiu	任丘市	Hebei	Cangzhou	1986-03-05
Sanhe	三河市	Hebei	Langfang	1993-03-03
Shahe	沙河市	Hebei	Xingtai	1987-02-20
Shenzhou	深州市	Hebei	Hengshui	1994-07-04
Shijiazhuang	石家庄市	Hebei	direct administration	1978-03-11
Tangshan	唐山市	Hebei	direct administration	1978-03-11
Xinji	辛集市	Hebei	Shijiazhuang	1986-03-05
Wu'an	武安市	Hebei	Handan	1988-09-01
Xingtai	邢台市	Hebei	direct administration	1983-11-15
Xinle	新乐市	Hebei	Shijiazhuang	1992-10-08
Zhangjiakou	张家口市	Hebei	direct administration	1983-11-15
Zhuozhou	涿州市	Hebei	Baoding	1986-09-24
Zunhua	遵化市	Hebei	Tangshan	1992-02-17
Anda	安达市	Heilongjiang	Suihua	1984-11-17
Bei'an	北安市	Heilongjiang	Heihe	1982-12-18
Daqing	大庆市	Heilongjiang	direct administration	1965-12-28
Dongning	东宁市	Heilongjiang	Mudanjiang	2015-12-15
Fujin	富锦市	Heilongjiang	Jiamusi	1988-08-30
Fuyuan	抚远市	Heilongjiang	Jiamusi	2016-01-13
Hailin	海林市	Heilongjiang	Mudanjiang	1992-07-28
Hailun	海伦市	Heilongjiang	Suihua	1989-12-23
Harbin	哈尔滨市	Heilongjiang	direct administration	1954-06-19
Hegang	鹤岗市	Heilongjiang	direct administration	1966-02-08
Heihe	黑河市	Heilongjiang	direct administration	1993-02-08
Hulin	虎林市	Heilongjiang	Jixi	1996-10-11
Jiamusi	佳木斯市	Heilongjiang	direct administration	1983-10-08
Jixi	鸡西市	Heilongjiang	direct administration	1966-02-08
Mishan	密山市	Heilongjiang	Jixi	1988-11-17
Mohe	漠河市	Heilongjiang	Daxing'anling	2018-02-22
Mudanjiang	牡丹江市	Heilongjiang	direct administration	1983-10-08
Muling	穆棱市	Heilongjiang	Mudanjiang	1995-03-07
Nehe	讷河市	Heilongjiang	Qiqihar	1992-09-02
Nenjiang	嫩江市	Heilongjiang	Heihe	2019-07-12
Ning'an	宁安市	Heilongjiang	Mudanjiang	1993-02-12
Qiqihar	齐齐哈尔市	Heilongjiang	direct administration	1964-01-15
Qitaihe	七台河市	Heilongjiang	direct administration	1983-10-08
Shangzhi	尚志市	Heilongjiang	Harbin	1988-09-14
Shuangyashan	双鸭山市	Heilongjiang	direct administration	1966-02-08
Suifenhe	绥芬河市	Heilongjiang	Mudanjiang	1975-08-15
Suihua	绥化市	Heilongjiang	direct administration	1999-12-28
Tieli	铁力市	Heilongjiang	Yichun	1988-09-13
Tongjiang	同江市	Heilongjiang	Jiamusi	1987-02-24
Wuchang	五常市	Heilongjiang	Harbin	1993-06-01
Wudalianchi	五大连池市	Heilongjiang	Heihe	1983-10-08
Yichun	伊春市	Heilongjiang	direct administration	1979-12-14
Zhaodong	肇东市	Heilongjiang	Suihua	1986-09-08
Anyang	安阳市	Henan	direct administration	1982-03-10
Changge	长葛市	Henan	Xuchang	1993-12-14
Changyuan	长垣市	Henan	Xinxiang	2019-07-12
Dengfeng	登封市	Henan	Zhengzhou	1994-05-30
Dengzhou	邓州市	Henan	Nanyang	1988-11-17
Gongyi	巩义市	Henan	Zhengzhou	1991-06-12
Hebi	鹤壁市	Henan	direct administration	1974-01-19
Huixian	辉县市	Henan	Xinxiang	1988-10-11
Jiaozuo	焦作市	Henan	direct administration	1974-01-19
Jiyuan	济源市	Henan	none	1988-06-25
Kaifeng	开封市	Henan	direct administration	1961-12-25
Lingbao	灵宝市	Henan	Sanmenxia	1993-05-12
Linzhou	林州市	Henan	Anyang	1994-01-24
Luohe	漯河市	Henan	direct administration	1986-01-18
Luoyang	洛阳市	Henan	direct administration	1964-04-30
Mengzhou	孟州市	Henan	Jiaozuo	1996-04-29
Nanyang	南阳市	Henan	direct administration	1994-07-01
Pingdingshan	平顶山市	Henan	direct administration	1969-03-15
Puyang	濮阳市	Henan	direct administration	1983-09-01
Qinyang	沁阳市	Henan	Jiaozuo	1989-09-27
Ruzhou	汝州市	Henan	Pingdingshan	1988-06-25
Sanmenxia	三门峡市	Henan	direct administration	1986-01-18
Shangqiu	商丘市	Henan	direct administration	1997-06-10
Weihui	卫辉市	Henan	Xinxiang	1988-10-08
Wugang	舞钢市	Henan	Pingdingshan	1990-09-04
Xiangcheng	项城市	Henan	Zhoukou	1993-12-16
Xingyang	荥阳市	Henan	Zhengzhou	1994-04-05
Xinmi	新密市	Henan	Zhengzhou	1994-04-05
Xinxiang	新乡市	Henan	direct administration	1982-03-10
Xinyang	信阳市	Henan	direct administration	1998-06-09
Xinzheng	新郑市	Henan	Zhengzhou	1994-05-16
Xuchang	许昌市	Henan	direct administration	1986-01-18
Yanshi	偃师市	Henan	Luoyang	1993-12-15
Yima	义马市	Henan	Sanmenxia	1981-04-04
Yongcheng	永城市	Henan	Shangqiu	1996-10-11
Yuzhou	禹州市	Henan	Xuchang	1988-06-25
Zhengzhou	郑州市	Henan	direct administration	1949-10-01
Zhoukou	周口市	Henan	direct administration	2000-06-08
Zhumadian	驻马店市	Henan	direct administration	2000-06-08
Anlu	安陆市	Hubei	Xiaogan	1987-09-04
Chibi	赤壁市	Hubei	Xianning	1986-05-27
Dangyang	当阳市	Hubei	Yichang	1988-10-22
Danjiangkou	丹江口市	Hubei	Shiyan	1983-08-19
Daye	大冶市	Hubei	Huangshi	1994-02-18
Enshi	恩施市	Hubei	Enshi	1981-11-07
Ezhou	鄂州市	Hubei	direct administration	1983-08-19
Guangshui	广水市	Hubei	Suizhou	1988-10-11
Hanchuan	汉川市	Hubei	Xiaogan	1997-03-12
Honghu	洪湖市	Hubei	Jingzhou	1987-07-31
Huanggang	黄冈市	Hubei	direct administration	1995-12-23
Huangshi	黄石市	Hubei	direct administration	1950-08-30
Jianli	监利市	Hubei	Jingzhou	2020-06-12
Jingmen	荆门市	Hubei	direct administration	1983-08-19
Jingshan	京山市	Hubei	Jingmen	2018-02-22
Jingzhou	荆州市	Hubei	direct administration	1994-09-29
Laohekou	老河口市	Hubei	Xiangyang	1979-11-16
Lichuan	利川市	Hubei	Enshi	1986-05-27
Macheng	麻城市	Hubei	Huanggang	1986-05-27
Qianjiang	潜江市	Hubei	none	1988-05-25
Shishou	石首市	Hubei	Jingzhou	1986-05-27
Shiyan	十堰市	Hubei	direct administration	1973-02-17
Suizhou	随州市	Hubei	direct administration	2000-06-25
Songzi	松滋市	Hubei	Jingzhou	1995-12-29
Tianmen	天门市	Hubei	none	1987-08-03
Wuhan	武汉市	Hubei	direct administration	1954-06-19
Wuxue	武穴市	Hubei	Huanggang	1987-10-23
Xiangyang	襄阳市	Hubei	direct administration	1979-06-21
Xianning	咸宁市	Hubei	direct administration	1998-12-06
Xiantao	仙桃市	Hubei	none	1986-05-27
Xiaogan	孝感市	Hubei	direct administration	1993-04-10
Yichang	宜昌市	Hubei	direct administration	1979-06-21
Yicheng	宜城市	Hubei	Xiangyang	1994-06-10
Yidu	宜都市	Hubei	Yichang	1987-11-30
Yingcheng	应城市	Hubei	Xiaogan	1986-05-27
Zaoyang	枣阳市	Hubei	Xiangyang	1988-01-08
Zhijiang	枝江市	Hubei	Yichang	1996-07-30
Zhongxiang	钟祥市	Hubei	Jingmen	1992-05-20
Changde	常德市	Hunan	direct administration	1988-01-23
Changning	常宁市	Hunan	Hengyang	1996-11-26
Changsha	长沙市	Hunan	direct administration	1949-10-01
Chenzhou	郴州市	Hunan	direct administration	1994-12-17
Hengyang	衡阳市	Hunan	direct administration	1980-02-20
Hongjiang	洪江市	Hunan	Huaihua	1979-09-01
Huaihua	怀化市	Hunan	direct administration	1997-11-29
Jinshi	津市市	Hunan	Changde	1979-12-19
Jishou	吉首市	Hunan	Xiangxi	1982-08-03
Leiyang	耒阳市	Hunan	Hengyang	1986-11-11
Lengshuijiang	冷水江市	Hunan	Loudi	1983-07-13
Lianyuan	涟源市	Hunan	Loudi	1987-06-10
Liling	醴陵市	Hunan	Zhuzhou	1985-05-24
Linxiang	临湘市	Hunan	Yueyang	1992-09-01
Liuyang	浏阳市	Hunan	Changsha	1993-01-16
Loudi	娄底市	Hunan	direct administration	1999-01-20
Miluo	汨罗市	Hunan	Yueyang	1987-09-23
Ningxiang	宁乡市	Hunan	Changsha	2017-04-09
Shaoshan	韶山市	Hunan	Xiangtan	1990-12-26
Shaodong	邵东市	Hunan	Shaoyang	2019-07-12
Shaoyang	邵阳市	Hunan	direct administration	1980-02-20
Wugang	武冈市	Hunan	Shaoyang	1994-02-18
Xiangtan	湘潭市	Hunan	direct administration	1980-02-20
Xiangxiang	湘乡市	Hunan	Xiangtan	1986-09-12
Yiyang	益阳市	Hunan	direct administration	1994-03-07
Yongzhou	永州市	Hunan	direct administration	1995-11-21
Yuanjiang	沅江市	Hunan	Yiyang	1988-10-11
Yueyang	岳阳市	Hunan	direct administration	1983-02-08
Zhangjiajie	张家界市	Hunan	direct administration	1988-05-18
Zhuzhou	株洲市	Hunan	direct administration	1956-11-30
Zixing	资兴市	Hunan	Chenzhou	1984-12-20
Arxan	阿尔山市	Inner Mongolia	Hinggan	1996-06-10
Baotou	包头市	Inner Mongolia	direct administration	1950-02-13
Bayannur	巴彦淖尔市	Inner Mongolia	direct administration	2003-12-01
Chifeng	赤峰市	Inner Mongolia	direct administration	1983-10-10
Erenhot	二连浩特市	Inner Mongolia	Xilingol	1966-01-18
Ergun	额尔古纳市	Inner Mongolia	Hulunbuir	1994-07-13
Fengzhen	丰镇市	Inner Mongolia	Ulanqab	1990-11-15
Genhe	根河市	Inner Mongolia	Hulunbuir	1994-04-28
Hohhot	呼和浩特市	Inner Mongolia	direct administration	1950-01-18
Holingol	霍林郭勒市	Inner Mongolia	Tongliao	1985-11-09
Hulunbuir	呼伦贝尔市	Inner Mongolia	direct administration	2001-10-10
Manzhouli	满洲里市	Inner Mongolia	Hulunbuir	1954-05-21
Ordos	鄂尔多斯市	Inner Mongolia	direct administration	2001-02-26
Tongliao	通辽市	Inner Mongolia	direct administration	1999-01-13
Ulanhot	乌兰浩特市	Inner Mongolia	Hinggan	1980-07-26
Ulanqab	乌兰察布市	Inner Mongolia	direct administration	2003-12-01
Wuhai	乌海市	Inner Mongolia	direct administration	1975-08-30
Xilinhot	锡林浩特市	Inner Mongolia	Xilingol	1983-10-10
Yakeshi	牙克石市	Inner Mongolia	Hulunbuir	1983-10-10
Zhalantun	扎兰屯市	Inner Mongolia	Hulunbuir	1983-10-10
Changshu	常熟市	Jiangsu	Suzhou	1983-01-18
Changzhou	常州市	Jiangsu	direct administration	1962-06-25
Danyang	丹阳市	Jiangsu	Zhenjiang	1987-12-15
Dongtai	东台市	Jiangsu	Yancheng	1987-12-17
Gaoyou	高邮市	Jiangsu	Yangzhou	1991-02-06
Hai'an	海安市	Jiangsu	Nantong	2018-02-22
Huai'an	淮安市	Jiangsu	direct administration	1983-01-18
Jiangyin	江阴市	Jiangsu	Wuxi	1987-04-23
Jingjiang	靖江市	Jiangsu	Taizhou	1993-07-14
Jurong	句容市	Jiangsu	Zhenjiang	1995-04-06
Liyang	溧阳市	Jiangsu	Changzhou	1990-08-15
Lianyungang	连云港市	Jiangsu	direct administration	1962-06-25
Kunshan	昆山市	Jiangsu	Suzhou	1989-07-27
Nanjing	南京市	Jiangsu	direct administration	1953-12-17
Nantong	南通市	Jiangsu	direct administration	1962-06-25
Pizhou	邳州市	Jiangsu	Xuzhou	1992-07-07
Qidong	启东市	Jiangsu	Nantong	1989-11-13
Rugao	如皋市	Jiangsu	Nantong	1991-02-06
Suqian	宿迁市	Jiangsu	direct administration	1996-07-19
Suzhou	苏州市	Jiangsu	direct administration	1962-06-25
Taicang	太仓市	Jiangsu	Suzhou	1993-01-08
Taixing	泰兴市	Jiangsu	Taizhou	1992-09-21
Taizhou	泰州市	Jiangsu	direct administration	1996-07-19
Wuxi	无锡市	Jiangsu	direct administration	1949-10-01
Xinghua	兴化市	Jiangsu	Taizhou	1987-12-22
Xinyi	新沂市	Jiangsu	Xuzhou	1990-02-05
Xuzhou	徐州市	Jiangsu	direct administration	1962-06-25
Yancheng	盐城市	Jiangsu	direct administration	1983-01-18
Yangzhong	扬中市	Jiangsu	Zhenjiang	1994-05-18
Yangzhou	扬州市	Jiangsu	direct administration	1983-01-18
Yixing	宜兴市	Jiangsu	Wuxi	1988-01-09
Yizheng	仪征市	Jiangsu	Yangzhou	1986-04-21
Zhangjiagang	张家港市	Jiangsu	Suzhou	1986-09-16
Zhenjiang	镇江市	Jiangsu	direct administration	1983-01-18
Dexing	德兴市	Jiangxi	Shangrao	1990-12-26
Fengcheng	丰城市	Jiangxi	Yichun	1988-10-04
Fuzhou	抚州市	Jiangxi	direct administration	2000-06-23
Ganzhou	赣州市	Jiangxi	direct administration	1998-12-24
Gao'an	高安市	Jiangxi	Yichun	1993-12-08
Gongqingcheng	共青城市	Jiangxi	Jiujiang	2010-09-10
Guixi	贵溪市	Jiangxi	Yingtan	1996-05-28
Ji'an	吉安市	Jiangxi	direct administration	2000-05-11
Jingdezhen	景德镇市	Jiangxi	direct administration	1953-06-15
Jinggangshan	井冈山市	Jiangxi	Ji'an	1984-12-13
Jiujiang	九江市	Jiangxi	direct administration	1980-03-28
Leping	乐平市	Jiangxi	Jingdezhen	1992-07-27
Longnan	龙南市	Jiangxi	Ganzhou	2020-06-12
Lushan	庐山市	Jiangxi	Jiujiang	2016-03-20
Nanchang	南昌市	Jiangxi	direct administration	1949-10-01
Pingxiang	萍乡市	Jiangxi	direct administration	1970-03-10
Ruichang	瑞昌市	Jiangxi	Jiujiang	1989-12-20
Ruijin	瑞金市	Jiangxi	Ganzhou	1994-05-18
Shangrao	上饶市	Jiangxi	direct administration	2000-06-23
Xinyu	新余市	Jiangxi	direct administration	1983-07-27
Yichun	宜春市	Jiangxi	direct administration	2000-05-22
Yingtan	鹰潭市	Jiangxi	direct administration	1983-07-27
Zhangshu	樟树市	Jiangxi	Yichun	1988-10-13
Baicheng	白城市	Jilin	direct administration	1993-06-14
Baishan	白山市	Jilin	direct administration	1985-02-04
Changchun	长春市	Jilin	direct administration	1954-06-19
Da'an	大安市	Jilin	Baicheng	1988-08-30
Dehui	德惠市	Jilin	Changchun	1994-07-06
Dunhua	敦化市	Jilin	Yanbian	1985-02-28
Fuyu	扶余市	Jilin	Songyuan	2013-01-24
Gongzhuling	公主岭市	Jilin	Changchun	1985-12-19
Helong	和龙市	Jilin	Yanbian	1993-07-05
Huadian	桦甸市	Jilin	Jilin	1988-05-25
Hunchun	珲春市	Jilin	Yanbian	1988-05-25
Ji'an	集安市	Jilin	Tonghua	1988-03-16
Jiaohe	蛟河市	Jilin	Jilin	1989-08-15
Jilin	吉林市	Jilin	direct administration	1949-10-01
Liaoyuan	辽源市	Jilin	direct administration	1983-08-30
Linjiang	临江市	Jilin	Baishan	1993-11-28
Longjing	龙井市	Jilin	Yanbian	1988-05-25
Meihekou	梅河口市	Jilin	Tonghua	1985-12-19
Panshi	磐石市	Jilin	Jilin	1995-08-30
Shuangliao	双辽市	Jilin	Siping	1996-04-29
Shulan	舒兰市	Jilin	Jilin	1992-10-08
Siping	四平市	Jilin	direct administration	1983-08-30
Songyuan	松原市	Jilin	direct administration	1992-06-06
Taonan	洮南市	Jilin	Baicheng	1987-05-21
Tonghua	通化市	Jilin	direct administration	1985-02-04
Tumen	图们市	Jilin	Yanbian	1965-03-27
Yanji	延吉市	Jilin	Yanbian	1953-05-04
Yushu	榆树市	Jilin	Changchun	1990-12-26
Anshan	鞍山市	Liaoning	direct administration	1954-06-19
Benxi	本溪市	Liaoning	direct administration	1954-06-19
Beipiao	北票市	Liaoning	Chaoyang	1985-01-17
Beizhen	北镇市	Liaoning	Jinzhou	1995-03-21
Chaoyang	朝阳市	Liaoning	direct administration	1984-06-30
Dalian	大连市	Liaoning	direct administration	1954-06-19
Dandong	丹东市	Liaoning	direct administration	1949-10-01
Dashiqiao	大石桥市	Liaoning	Yingkou	1992-11-03
Dengta	灯塔市	Liaoning	Liaoyang	1996-08-27
Diaobingshan	调兵山市	Liaoning	Tieling	1986-09-12
Donggang	东港市	Liaoning	Dandong	1993-06-18
Fengcheng	凤城市	Liaoning	Dandong	1994-03-08
Fushun	抚顺市	Liaoning	direct administration	1954-06-19
Fuxin	阜新市	Liaoning	direct administration	1949-10-01
Gaizhou	盖州市	Liaoning	Yingkou	1992-11-03
Haicheng	海城市	Liaoning	Anshan	1985-01-17
Huludao	葫芦岛市	Liaoning	direct administration	1989-06-12
Jinzhou	锦州市	Liaoning	direct administration	1949-10-01
Kaiyuan	开原市	Liaoning	Tieling	1988-12-27
Liaoyang	辽阳市	Liaoning	direct administration	1965-12-27
Linghai	凌海市	Liaoning	Jinzhou	1993-11-16
Lingyuan	凌源市	Liaoning	Chaoyang	1991-12-21
Panjin	盘锦市	Liaoning	direct administration	1984-06-05
Shenyang	沈阳市	Liaoning	direct administration	1954-06-19
Tieling	铁岭市	Liaoning	direct administration	1984-06-30
Wafangdian	瓦房店市	Liaoning	Dalian	1985-01-17
Xingcheng	兴城市	Liaoning	Huludao	1986-09-12
Xinmin	新民市	Liaoning	Shenyang	1993-06-14
Yingkou	营口市	Liaoning	direct administration	1949-10-01
Zhuanghe	庄河市	Liaoning	Dalian	1992-09-21
Guyuan	固原市	Ningxia	direct administration	2001-07-07
Lingwu	灵武市	Ningxia	Yinchuan	1996-04-29
Qingtongxia	青铜峡市	Ningxia	Wuzhong	1984-12-17
Shizuishan	石嘴山市	Ningxia	direct administration	1975-11-23
Wuzhong	吴忠市	Ningxia	direct administration	1998-05-11
Yinchuan	银川市	Ningxia	direct administration	1958-08-11
Zhongwei	中卫市	Ningxia	direct administration	2003-12-31
Delingha	德令哈市	Qinghai	Haixi	1988-04-19
Golmud	格尔木市	Qinghai	Haixi	1980-06-14
Haidong	海东市	Qinghai	direct administration	2013-02-08
Mangnai	茫崖市	Qinghai	Haixi	2018-02-22
Tongren	同仁市	Qinghai	Huangnan	2020-06-12
Xining	西宁市	Qinghai	direct administration	1956-07-14
Yushu	玉树市	Qinghai	Yushu	2013-07-04
Ankang	安康市	Shaanxi	direct administration	2000-06-23
Baoji	宝鸡市	Shaanxi	direct administration	1971-10-05
Binzhou	彬州市	Shaanxi	Xianyang	2018-02-22
Hancheng	韩城市	Shaanxi	Weinan	1983-09-09
Hanzhong	汉中市	Shaanxi	direct administration	1996-02-21
Huayin	华阴市	Shaanxi	Weinan	1990-12-27
Shangluo	商洛市	Shaanxi	direct administration	2001-08-31
Shenmu	神木市	Shaanxi	Yulin	2017-04-09
Tongchuan	铜川市	Shaanxi	direct administration	1966-06-24
Weinan	渭南市	Shaanxi	direct administration	1983-09-09
Xi'an	西安市	Shaanxi	direct administration	1954-06-19
Xianyang	咸阳市	Shaanxi	direct administration	1983-09-09
Xingping	兴平市	Shaanxi	Xianyang	1993-06-18
Xunyang	旬阳市	Shaanxi	Ankang	2021-01-20
Yan'an	延安市	Shaanxi	direct administration	1996-11-05
Yulin	榆林市	Shaanxi	direct administration	1999-12-05
Zichang	子长市	Shaanxi	Yan'an	2019-07-12
Anqiu	安丘市	Shandong	Weifang	1994-01-18
Binzhou	滨州市	Shandong	direct administration	2000-06-10
Changyi	昌邑市	Shandong	Weifang	1994-06-10
Dezhou	德州市	Shandong	direct administration	1994-12-17
Dongying	东营市	Shandong	direct administration	1982-11-10
Feicheng	肥城市	Shandong	Tai'an	1992-08-01
Gaomi	高密市	Shandong	Weifang	1994-05-18
Haiyang	海阳市	Shandong	Yantai	1996-04-29
Heze	菏泽市	Shandong	direct administration	2000-06-23
Jiaozhou	胶州市	Shandong	Qingdao	1987-02-12
Jinan	济南市	Shandong	direct administration	1949-10-01
Jining	济宁市	Shandong	direct administration	1983-08-30
Laixi	莱西市	Shandong	Qingdao	1990-12-18
Laiyang	莱阳市	Shandong	Yantai	1987-02-20
Laizhou	莱州市	Shandong	Yantai	1988-02-24
Leling	乐陵市	Shandong	Dezhou	1988-09-01
Liaocheng	聊城市	Shandong	direct administration	1997-08-29
Linqing	临清市	Shandong	Liaocheng	1983-08-30
Linyi	临沂市	Shandong	direct administration	1994-12-17
Longkou	龙口市	Shandong	Yantai	1986-09-23
Pingdu	平度市	Shandong	Qingdao	1989-07-27
Qingdao	青岛市	Shandong	direct administration	1949-10-01
Qingzhou	青州市	Shandong	Weifang	1986-03-01
Qixia	栖霞市	Shandong	Yantai	1995-11-30
Qufu	曲阜市	Shandong	Jining	1986-06-02
Rizhao	日照市	Shandong	direct administration	1989-06-12
Rongcheng	荣成市	Shandong	Weihai	1988-11-01
Rushan	乳山市	Shandong	Weihai	1993-07-17
Shouguang	寿光市	Shandong	Weifang	1993-06-01
Tai'an	泰安市	Shandong	direct administration	1985-03-27
Tengzhou	滕州市	Shandong	Zaozhuang	1988-03-07
Weifang	潍坊市	Shandong	direct administration	1983-08-30
Weihai	威海市	Shandong	direct administration	1987-06-15
Xintai	新泰市	Shandong	Tai'an	1983-08-30
Yantai	烟台市	Shandong	direct administration	1983-08-30
Yucheng	禹城市	Shandong	Dezhou	1993-09-09
Zaozhuang	枣庄市	Shandong	direct administration	1961-09-12
Zhaoyuan	招远市	Shandong	Yantai	1991-12-21
Zhucheng	诸城市	Shandong	Weifang	1987-04-20
Zibo	淄博市	Shandong	direct administration	1961-09-12
Zoucheng	邹城市	Shandong	Jining	1992-10-04
Zouping	邹平市	Shandong	Binzhou	2018-07-02
Changzhi	长治市	Shanxi	direct administration	1975-07-09
Datong	大同市	Shanxi	direct administration	1972-03-09
Fenyang	汾阳市	Shanxi	Lüliang	1996-08-20
Gaoping	高平市	Shanxi	Jincheng	1993-05-12
Gujiao	古交市	Shanxi	Taiyuan	1988-02-24
Hejin	河津市	Shanxi	Yuncheng	1994-01-12
Houma	侯马市	Shanxi	Linfen	1971-06-05
Huairen	怀仁市	Shanxi	Shuozhou	2018-02-22
Huozhou	霍州市	Shanxi	Linfen	1989-12-23
Jiexiu	介休市	Shanxi	Jinzhong	1992-02-10
Jincheng	晋城市	Shanxi	direct administration	1985-04-30
Jinzhong	晋中市	Shanxi	direct administration	1999-09-24
Linfen	临汾市	Shanxi	direct administration	2000-06-23
Lüliang	吕梁市	Shanxi	direct administration	2003-10-23
Shuozhou	朔州市	Shanxi	direct administration	1988-03-24
Taiyuan	太原市	Shanxi	direct administration	1949-10-01
Xiaoyi	孝义市	Shanxi	Lüliang	1992-02-10
Xinzhou	忻州市	Shanxi	direct administration	2000-06-14
Yangquan	阳泉市	Shanxi	direct administration	1972-03-09
Yongji	永济市	Shanxi	Yuncheng	1994-01-12
Yuncheng	运城市	Shanxi	direct administration	2000-06-14
Yuanping	原平市	Shanxi	Xinzhou	1993-06-17
Barkam	马尔康市	Sichuan	Ngawa	2015-11-02
Bazhong	巴中市	Sichuan	direct administration	2000-06-14
Chengdu	成都市	Sichuan	direct administration	1949-10-01
Chongzhou	崇州市	Sichuan	Chengdu	1994-06-20
Dazhou	达州市	Sichuan	direct administration	1999-06-20
Deyang	德阳市	Sichuan	direct administration	1983-08-18
Dujiangyan	都江堰市	Sichuan	Chengdu	1988-03-03
Emeishan	峨眉山市	Sichuan	Leshan	1988-09-01
Guang'an	广安市	Sichuan	direct administration	1998-07-31
Guanghan	广汉市	Sichuan	Deyang	1988-02-24
Guangyuan	广元市	Sichuan	direct administration	1985-02-08
Huaying	华蓥市	Sichuan	Guang'an	1985-02-04
Huili	会理市	Sichuan	Liangshan	2021-02-01
Jiangyou	江油市	Sichuan	Mianyang	1988-02-24
Jianyang	简阳市	Sichuan	Chengdu	1994-04-05
Kangding	康定市	Sichuan	Garzê	2015-02-17
Langzhong	阆中市	Sichuan	Nanchong	1991-01-12
Leshan	乐山市	Sichuan	direct administration	1985-02-11
Longchang	隆昌市	Sichuan	Neijiang	2017-04-09
Luzhou	泸州市	Sichuan	direct administration	1983-03-03
Mianzhu	绵竹市	Sichuan	Deyang	1996-10-15
Meishan	眉山市	Sichuan	direct administration	2000-06-10
Mianyang	绵阳市	Sichuan	direct administration	1985-02-08
Nanchong	南充市	Sichuan	direct administration	1993-07-02
Neijiang	内江市	Sichuan	direct administration	1985-02-11
Panzhihua	攀枝花市	Sichuan	direct administration	1965-04-22
Pengzhou	彭州市	Sichuan	Chengdu	1993-12-01
Qionglai	邛崃市	Sichuan	Chengdu	1994-06-19
Shifang	什邡市	Sichuan	Deyang	1995-11-08
Shehong	射洪市	Sichuan	Suining	2019-07-12
Suining	遂宁市	Sichuan	direct administration	1985-02-08
Wanyuan	万源市	Sichuan	Dazhou	1993-07-14
Xichang	西昌市	Sichuan	Liangshan	1979-07-19
Ya'an	雅安市	Sichuan	direct administration	2000-06-14
Yibin	宜宾市	Sichuan	direct administration	1996-10-05
Zigong	自贡市	Sichuan	direct administration	1949-10-01
Ziyang	资阳市	Sichuan	direct administration	2000-06-14
Lhasa	拉萨市	Tibet	direct administration	1960-01-07
Nagqu	那曲市	Tibet	direct administration	2017-07-18
Nyingchi	林芝市	Tibet	direct administration	2015-03-16
Qamdo	昌都市	Tibet	direct administration	2014-10-29
Shannan	山南市	Tibet	direct administration	2016-01-07
Xigazê	日喀则市	Tibet	direct administration	2014-06-26
Aksu	阿克苏市	Xinjiang	Aksu	1983-08-19
Alashankou	阿拉山口市	Xinjiang	Bortala	2012-12-17
Altay	阿勒泰市	Xinjiang	Altay	1984-11-17
Aral	阿拉尔市	Xinjiang (XPCC)	none	2002-09-17
Artux	阿图什市	Xinjiang	Kizilsu	1986-06-07
Beitun	北屯市	Xinjiang (XPCC)	none	2011-12-27
Bole	博乐市	Xinjiang	Bortala	1985-06-24
Changji	昌吉市	Xinjiang	Changji	1983-07-21
Fukang	阜康市	Xinjiang	Changji	1992-11-03
Hami	哈密市	Xinjiang	direct administration	2016-01-07
Hotan	和田市	Xinjiang	Hotan	1983-09-09
Huyanghe	胡杨河市	Xinjiang (XPCC)	none	2019-11-06
Karamay	克拉玛依市	Xinjiang	direct administration	1982-02-16
Kashgar	喀什市	Xinjiang	Kashgar	1952-05-22
Khorgas	霍尔果斯市	Xinjiang	Ili	2014-06-26
Kokdala	可克达拉市	Xinjiang (XPCC)	none	2015-03-16
Korla	库尔勒市	Xinjiang	Bayingolin	1979-09-02
Kunyu	昆玉市	Xinjiang (XPCC)	none	2016-01-07
Kuqa	库车市	Xinjiang	Aksu	2019-11-20
Kuytun	奎屯市	Xinjiang	Ili	1975-08-29
Shawan	沙湾市	Xinjiang	Tacheng	2021-01-20
Shihezi	石河子市	Xinjiang (XPCC)	none	1976-01-02
Shuanghe	双河市	Xinjiang (XPCC)	none	2014-01-25
Tacheng	塔城市	Xinjiang	Tacheng	1984-11-17
Tiemenguan	铁门关市	Xinjiang (XPCC)	none	2012-12-17
Tumxuk	图木舒克市	Xinjiang (XPCC)	none	2002-09-17
Turpan	吐鲁番市	Xinjiang	direct administration	2015-03-16
Ürümqi	乌鲁木齐市	Xinjiang	direct administration	1949-10-01
Wujiaqu	五家渠市	Xinjiang (XPCC)	none	2002-09-17
Wusu	乌苏市	Xinjiang	Tacheng	1996-07-10
Xinxing	新星市	Xinjiang (XPCC)	none	2021-02-04
Yining	伊宁市	Xinjiang	Ili	1952-05-22
Anning	安宁市	Yunnan	Kunming	1995-10-13
Baoshan	保山市	Yunnan	direct administration	2000-12-30
Chengjiang	澄江市	Yunnan	Yuxi	2019-11-20
Chuxiong	楚雄市	Yunnan	Chuxiong	1983-09-09
Dali	大理市	Yunnan	Dali	1983-09-09
Gejiu	个旧市	Yunnan	Honghe	1958-09-16
Jinghong	景洪市	Yunnan	Xishuangbanna	1993-12-22
Kaiyuan	开远市	Yunnan	Honghe	1981-01-18
Kunming	昆明市	Yunnan	direct administration	1949-10-01
Lincang	临沧市	Yunnan	direct administration	2003-12-26
Lijiang	丽江市	Yunnan	direct administration	2002-12-26
Lufeng	禄丰市	Yunnan	Chuxiong	2021-01-20
Lushui	泸水市	Yunnan	Nujiang	2016-06-16
Mangshi	芒市	Yunnan	Dehong	1996-10-28
Mengzi	蒙自市	Yunnan	Honghe	2010-09-10
Mile	弥勒市	Yunnan	Honghe	2013-01-24
Pu'er	普洱市	Yunnan	direct administration	2003-10-30
Qujing	曲靖市	Yunnan	direct administration	1997-05-06
Ruili	瑞丽市	Yunnan	Dehong	1992-06-26
Shangri-La	香格里拉市	Yunnan	Dêqên	2014-12-16
Shuifu	水富市	Yunnan	Zhaotong	2018-07-02
Tengchong	腾冲市	Yunnan	Baoshan	2015-08-01
Wenshan	文山市	Yunnan	Wenshan	2010-12-02
Xuanwei	宣威市	Yunnan	Qujing	1994-02-18
Yuxi	玉溪市	Yunnan	direct administration	1997-12-13
Zhaotong	昭通市	Yunnan	direct administration	2001-01-13
Cixi	慈溪市	Zhejiang	Ningbo	1988-10-13
Dongyang	东阳市	Zhejiang	Jinhua	1988-05-25
Haining	海宁市	Zhejiang	Jiaxing	1986-11-22
Hangzhou	杭州市	Zhejiang	direct administration	1949-10-01
Huzhou	湖州市	Zhejiang	direct administration	1983-07-27
Jiande	建德市	Zhejiang	Hangzhou	1992-04-01
Jiangshan	江山市	Zhejiang	Quzhou	1987-11-27
Jiaxing	嘉兴市	Zhejiang	direct administration	1983-07-27
Jinhua	金华市	Zhejiang	direct administration	1985-05-15
Lanxi	兰溪市	Zhejiang	Jinhua	1985-05-15
Linhai	临海市	Zhejiang	Taizhou	1986-03-01
Lishui	丽水市	Zhejiang	direct administration	2000-05-20
Longgang	龙港市	Zhejiang	Wenzhou	2019-08-16
Longquan	龙泉市	Zhejiang	Lishui	1990-12-26
Ningbo	宁波市	Zhejiang	direct administration	1949-12-20
Pinghu	平湖市	Zhejiang	Jiaxing	1991-06-15
Quzhou	衢州市	Zhejiang	direct administration	1985-05-15
Ruian	瑞安市	Zhejiang	Wenzhou	1987-04-15
Shaoxing	绍兴市	Zhejiang	direct administration	1983-07-27
Shengzhou	嵊州市	Zhejiang	Shaoxing	1995-08-30
Taizhou	台州市	Zhejiang	direct administration	1994-08-22
Tongxiang	桐乡市	Zhejiang	Jiaxing	1993-03-26
Wenling	温岭市	Zhejiang	Taizhou	1994-02-18
Wenzhou	温州市	Zhejiang	direct administration	1949-11-06
Yiwu	义乌市	Zhejiang	Jinhua	1988-05-25
Yongkang	永康市	Zhejiang	Jinhua	1992-08-24
Yueqing	乐清市	Zhejiang	Wenzhou	1993-09-18
Yuhuan	玉环市	Zhejiang	Taizhou	2017-04-09
Yuyao	余姚市	Zhejiang	Ningbo	1985-07-16
Zhoushan	舟山市	Zhejiang	direct administration	1987-01-23
Zhuji	诸暨市	Zhejiang	Shaoxing	1989-09-27

=== Renamed cities ===
Before	Chinese	After	Chinese	Renamed date
Weihaiwei	威海卫市	Weihai	威海市	1949-11-01
Xingshan	兴山市	Hegang	鹤岗市	1950-03-23
Xi'an	西安市	Liaoyuan	辽源市	1952-04-03
Nanzheng	南郑市	Hanzhong	汉中市	1953-10-24
Dihua	迪化市	Ürümqi	乌鲁木齐市	1953-11-20
Guisui	归绥市	Hohhot	呼和浩特市	1954-04-20
Xinhailian	新海连市	Lianyungang	连云港市	1961-09-02
Andong	安东市	Dandong	丹东市	1965-01-20
Suixi	濉溪市	Huaibei	淮北市	1971-03-30
Anda	安达市	Daqing	大庆市	1979-12-14
Sucheng	宿城市	Suzhou	宿州市	1980-02-29
Lüda	旅大市	Dalian	大连市	1981-02-09
Dukou	渡口市	Panzhihua	攀枝花市	1987-01-23
Meixian	梅县市	Meizhou	梅州市	1988-01-07
Daxian	达县市	Dazhou	达州市	1993-07-05
Hunjiang	浑江市	Baishan	白山市	1994-01-31
Dayong	大庸市	Zhangjiajie	张家界市	1994-04-04
Jinxi	锦西市	Huludao	葫芦岛市	1994-09-20
Jingsha	荆沙市	Jingzhou	荆州市	1996-11-20
Puqi	蒲圻市	Chibi	赤壁市	1998-06-11
Zhicheng	枝城市	Yidu	宜都市	1998-06-11
Huaiyin	淮阴市	Huai'an	淮安市	2000-12-21
Tongza	通什市	Wuzhishan	五指山市	2001-07-05
Tiefa	铁法市	Diaobingshan	调兵山市	2002-02-20
Beining	北宁市	Beizhen	北镇市	2006-02-08
Simao	思茅市	Pu'er	普洱市	2007-01-21
Luxi	潞西市	Mangshi	芒市	2007-12-30
Xiangfan	襄樊市	Xiangyang	襄阳市	2010-11-26

=== Dissolved cities ===
City	Chinese	Founded	Dissolved	Merged division	Former status
Acheng	阿城市	1987-02-24	2006-08-15	merge into Harbin	County-level city
Anjiang	安江市	1961-07-09	1962-10-20	merge into Huaihua Prefecture	
Bayangol	巴彦郭勒市	1960-01-07	1964-07-20	merge into Bayannur League	
Bayanhot	巴彦浩特市	1954-06-19	1956-04-03	merge into Alxa League	
Beibei	北碚市	1951-11-05	1953-03-13	merge into Chongqing	
Boshan	博山市	1949-10-01	1950-05-09	merge into Zibo Prefecture	
Changle	长乐市	1994-02-18	2017-07-18	merge into Fuzhou, Fujian	County-level city
Chaohu	巢湖市	1999-07-09	2011-07-14	merge into Hefei	Prefecture-level city
Chaoyang	潮阳市	1993-04-09	2003-01-29	merge into Shantou	County-level city
Chenghai	澄海市	1994-04-18	2003-01-29	merge into Shantou	County-level city
Conghua	从化市	1994-03-26	2014-02-12	merge into Guangzhou	County-level city
Dafeng	大丰市	1996-08-01	2015-07-23	merge into Yancheng	County-level city
Da Qaidam	大柴旦市	1960-11-17	1964-06-05	merge into Haixi Prefecture	
Dêwolu	德乌鲁市	1958-12-20	1961-12-15	merge into Gannan Prefecture	
Dongchuan	东川市	1958-10-20	1998-12-06	merge into Kunming	Prefecture-level city
Dongjiang	东江市	1961-07-09	1962-10-20	merge into Binzhou	
Dongsheng	东胜市	1983-10-10	2001-02-26	merge into Ordos	County-level city
Echeng	鄂城市	1960-11-17	1961-12-15	merge into Huanggang Prefecture	
Fengfeng	峰峰市	1955-05-06	1956-10-12	merge into Handan	
Fenghua	奉化市	1988-10-13	2016-09-14	merge into Ningbo	County-level city
Fengnan	丰南市	1994-04-05	2002-02-01	merge into Tangshan	County-level city
Fuling	涪陵市	1995-11-05	1997-03-14	merge into Chongqing	Prefecture-level city
Fuyang	富阳市	1994-01-18	2014-12-13	merge into Hangzhou	County-level city
Gaocheng	藁城市	1989-07-02	2014-09-09	merge into Shijiazhuang	County-level city
Gaoming	高明市	1994-04-18	2002-12-08	merge into Foshan	County-level city
Gaoyao	高要市	1993-09-28	2015-05-07	merge into Zhaoqing	County-level city
Haibowan	海勃湾市	1961-07-09	1975-08-30	merge into Wuhai	
Hailar	海拉尔市	1949-10-01	2001-10-10	merge into Hulunbuir	County-level city
Haimen	海门市	1994-04-26	2020-06-05	merge into Nantong	County-level city
Hangu	汉沽市	1953-11-06	1958-06-06	merge into Tianjin	
Hankou	汉口市	1949-10-01	1949-10-01	merge into Wuhan	
Hanyang	汉阳市	1949-10-01	1949-10-01	merge into Wuhan	
Hechuan	合川市	1952-04-04	2006-10-22	merge into Chongqing	County-level city
Hekou	河口市	1950-06-10	1955-01-03	merge into Honghe Prefecture	
Huadu	花都市	1993-06-18	2000-05-21	merge into Guangzhou	County-level city
Huangyan	黄岩市	1989-09-27	1994-08-22	merge into Taizhou, Zhejiang	County-level city
Huangzhou	黄州市	1990-12-26	1995-12-23	merge into Huanggang	County-level city
Huiyang	惠阳市	1994-05-06	2003-03-06	merge into Huizhou	County-level city
Jiangdu	江都市	1994-04-26	2011-11-14	merge into Yangzhou	County-level city
Jiangjin	江津市	1992-08-04	2006-10-22	merge into Chongqing	County-level city
Jiangyan	姜堰市	1994-07-17	2012-12-20	merge into Taizhou, Jiangsu	County-level city
Jiaojiang	椒江市	1981-07-21	1994-08-22	merge into Taizhou, Zhejiang	County-level city
Jianyang	建阳市	1994-03-04	2014-05-15	merge into Nanping	County-level city
Jiaonan	胶南市	1990-12-18	2012-12-01	merge into Qingdao	County-level city
Jimo	即墨市	1989-07-27	2017-07-18	merge into Qingdao	County-level city
Jintan	金坛市	1993-11-10	2015-04-29	merge into Changzhou	County-level city
Jingpohu	镜泊湖市	1986-07-01	1987-11-27	merge into Mudanjiang	
Jining	集宁市	1954-06-19	2003-12-01	merge into Ulanqab	County-level city
Jiutai	九台市	1988-08-30	2014-11-02	merge into Changchun	County-level city
Jizhou	冀州市	1993-09-22	2016-06-08	merge into Hengshui	County-level city
Laiwu	莱芜市	1992-11-22	2019-01-09	merge into Jinan	Prefecture-level city
Lenghu	冷湖市	1960-11-17	1964-06-05	merge into Haixi Prefecture	
Lengjiang	冷江市	1961-07-09	1962-10-20	merge into Loudi	
Lengshuitan	冷水滩市	1961-07-09	1962-10-20	merge into Yongzhou Prefecture	
Lin'an	临安市	1996-10-28	2017-07-18	merge into Hangzhou	County-level city
Linchuan	临川市	1987-08-22	2000-06-23	merge into Fuzhou, Jiangxi	County-level city
Linhe	临河市	1984-12-11	2003-12-01	merge into Bayannur	County-level city
Lishi	离石市	1996-04-02	2003-10-23	merge into Lüliang	County-level city
Liuzhi	六枝市	1960-05-26	1962-10-20	merge into Anshun Prefecture	
Lucheng	潞城市	1994-04-26	2018-06-18	merge into Changzhi	County-level city
Luquan	鹿泉市	1989-07-02	2014-09-09	merge into Shijiazhuang	County-level city
Lüshun	旅顺市	1949-10-01	1960-01-07	merge into Lüda	
Malipo	麻栗坡市	1950-06-10	1955-01-03	merge into Wenshan Prefecture	
Miquan	米泉市	1996-12-30	2007-06-30	merge into Ürümqi	County-level city
Nanchuan	南川市	1994-06-10	2006-10-22	merge into Chongqing	County-level city
Nanhai	南海市	1992-09-02	2002-12-08	merge into Foshan	County-level city
Nankang	南康市	1995-03-07	2013-10-18	merge into Ganzhou	County-level city
Panyu	番禺市	1992-05-20	2000-05-21	merge into Guangzhou	County-level city
Penglai	蓬莱市	1991-11-30	2020-06-05	merge into Yantai	County-level city
Pulandian	普兰店市	1991-11-30	2015-10-13	merge into Dalian	County-level city
Qingjiang	清江市	1950-12-18; 1964-08-18	1958-09-05; 1983-01-18	rename as Huaiyin	
Qiongshan	琼山市	1994-01-24	2002-10-16	merge into Haikou	County-level city
Runan	汝南市	1950-05-09	1951-04-26	merge into Xinyang Prefecture	
Sanshui	三水市	1993-03-29	2002-12-08	merge into Foshan	County-level city
Shangyu	上虞市	1992-08-24	2013-10-18	merge into Shaoxing	County-level city
Shangzhou	商州市	1988-05-24	2001-08-31	merge into Shangluo	County-level city
Shanhaiguan	山海关市	1949-10-01	1953-01-02	merge into Qinhuangdao	
Shashi	沙市市	1979-06-21	1994-09-29	merge into Jingsha	Prefecture-level city
Shayang	沙洋市	1960-11-17	1961-12-15	merge into Jingzhou	
Shuangcheng	双城市	1988-09-14	2014-05-15	merge into Harbin	County-level city
Shidao	石岛市	1949-10-01	1950-05-09	merge into Rongcheng	
Shiqi	石岐市	1953-03-12	1959-03-20	merge into Zhongshan	
Shunde	顺德市	1992-03-26	2002-12-08	merge into Foshan	County-level city
Taishan	泰山市	1958-06-01	1958-11-01	merge into Tai'an	
Tongguanshan	铜官山市	1956-07-02	1958-09-05	merge into Tongling	
Tongzhou	通州市	1953-11-06	1958-03-07	merge into Beijing	
Tongzhou	通州市	1993-01-08	2009-03-31	merge into Nantong	County-level city
Tunxi	屯溪市	1975-12-19	1987-11-27	merge into Huangshan	
Wanding	畹町市	1985-01-31	1999-01-02	merge into Dehong Prefecture	County-level city
Wanxian	万县市	1992-12-11	1997-03-14	merge into Chongqing	Prefecture-level city
Wuchang	武昌市	1949-10-01	1949-10-01	merge into Wuhan	
Wendeng	文登市	1988-10-24	2014-03-18	merge into Weihai	County-level city
Wuda	乌达市	1961-07-09	1975-08-30	merge into Wuhai	
Wujiang	吴江市	1992-02-17	2010-09-01	merge into Suzhou, Jiangsu	County-level city
Wujin	武进市	1995-06-08	2002-04-03	merge into Changzhou	County-level city
Wutongqiao	五通桥市	1952-04-04	1985-02-11	merge into Leshan	
Wuxian	吴县市	1995-06-08	2000-12-31	merge into Suzhou, Jiangsu	County-level city
Xiaguan	下关市	1951-03-14; 1962-03-27	1960-09-13; 1983-09-09	merge into Dali Prefecture	
Xiaoshan	萧山市	1987-11-27	2001-02-02	merge into Hanzhou	County-level city
Xifeng	西峰市	1986-01-01	2002-06-22	merge into Qingyang	County-level city
Xinhui	新会市	1992-10-08	2002-06-22	merge into Jiangmen	County-level city
Xinwen	新汶市	1960-03-28	1983-08-30	merge into Xintai	
Xishan	锡山市	1995-06-08	2000-12-21	merge into Wuxi	County-level city
Xuanhua	宣化市	1952-11-05	1955-08-08	merge into Zhengjiakou	
Yangkou	杨口市	1949-10-01	1950-05-09	merge into Qinghe	
Yanzhou	兖州市	1992-08-01	2013-10-18	merge into Jining	County-level city
Yizhou	宜州市	1993-09-09	2016-11-24	merge into Hechi	County-level city
Yongchuan	永川市	1992-03-09	2006-10-22	merge into Chongqing	County-level city
Yuci	榆次市	1954-04-09	1999-09-24	merge into Jinzhong	County-level city
Yuhang	余杭市	1994-04-05	2001-02-02	merge into Hangzhou	County-level city
Zengcheng	增城市	1993-12-08	2014-02-12	merge into Guangzhou	County-level city
Zhangqiu	章丘市	1992-08-01	2016-09-14	merge into Jinan	County-level city
Zhangzhou	张周市	1950-11-18	1954-12-09	merge into Zibo	
Zhuji	朱集市	1949-10-01	1951-08-03	merge into Shangqiu	

== Tier system ==
The Chinese central government introduced a ranking system in the 1980s to facilitate the staged rollout of infrastructure and urban development throughout the country. Cities were ranked by tier according to the government's development priorities. The tier system began as a bureaucratic classification, but has since the later 1990s acquired new salience from the perspectives of real estate development, commercial vitality and cosmopolitanness, besides the old notions of population, economic size, and political ranking. It has now become a proxy for demographic and social segmentation in China, especially relevant to those college-educated seeking non-governmental employment.

It is the general consensus that four cities, namely Beijing, Shanghai, Guangzhou, Shenzhen, belong to the first tier, hereafter ‘new Tier I' and 'Tier II' includes other major cities. Small and medium cities are grouped into Tier III or IV.

== Republic of China (1912–1949) ==
Note: All names are transliterated in pinyin.
Fu (府) cities

City	Chinese	Province	Administration period
Nanjing	南京府	Nanjing	1914–1927
Shuntian	順天府 (顺天府)	Shuntian	1914–1921

Shi (市) cities

Type	No.
Special/Yuan/Direct-controlled*	16
Province-controlled	70

City	Chinese	Province	Type	Administration period	Founded (ROC)
Guangzhou	廣州市 (广州市)	Guangdong Guangzhou	Province-controlled (de facto) Ordinary (de jure) Yuan-controlled Direct-controlled	15 Feb. 1921 – Jan. 1930; 20 June 1930 – 7 June 1947 3 July 1921 – 29 December 1928 Jan. 1930 – 20 June 1930 Jan. 1930 – 20 June 1930; 7 June 1947 – 1 October 1949	1921-02-15
Shantou	汕頭市 (汕头市)	Guangdong	Province-controlled	Mar. 1921 – 1 October 1949	1921-03-
Beiping Jingdu Beiping	北平市 京都市 北平市	Hebei Jingdu Beiping	Province-controlled (claimed) Special (de jure) Yuan-controlled Direct-controlled	Apr 1921 – 20 June 1928; 20 June 1930 – Dec. 1930 3 July 1921 – 29 December 1928 20 June 1928 – 30 May 1930 30 May 1930 – 20 June 1930; Dec. 1930 – 1 October 1949	1921-04-
Chengdu	成都市	Sichuan	Province-controlled	June 1921 – 1 October 1949	1921-06-
Qingdao	青島市 (青岛市)	Qingdao	Special Yuan-controlled Direct-controlled	3 July 1921 – 29 December 1928 July 1929 – 30 May 1930 30 May 1930 – 1 October 1949	1921-07-03
Harbin	哈爾濱市 (哈尔滨市)	Harbin	Special Direct-controlled	3 July 1921 – 29 December 1928 5 June 1947 – 1 October 1949	1921-07-03
Wuxi	無錫市 (无锡市)	Jiangsu	Ordinary Province-controlled	3 July 1921 – 29 December 1928 1929 – Apr. 1930	1921-07-03
Hangzhou	杭州市	Zhejiang	Ordinary (de jure) Province-controlled (de facto)	3 July 1921 – 29 December 1928 Apr. 1927 – 1 October 1949	1921-07-03
Ningbo	寧波市 (宁波市)	Zhejiang	Ordinary (de jure) Province-controlled (de facto)	3 July 1921 – 29 December 1928 Apr. 1927– Feb. 1931	1921-07-03
Anqing	安慶市 (安庆市)	Anhui	Ordinary (de jure) Province-controlled (de facto)	3 July 1921 – 29 December 1928 1927 – Sep. 1930	1921-07-03
Wuchang	武昌市	Hubei	Ordinary Province-controlled	3 July 1921 – 29 December 1928 July 1935 – 1 October 1949	1921-07-03
Nanchang	南昌市	Jiangxi	Ordinary Province-controlled	3 July 1921 – 29 December 1928 July 1935 – 1 October 1949	1921-07-03
Wuzhou	梧州市	Guangxi	Ordinary (de iure) Province-controlled (de facto)	3 July 1921 – 29 December 1928 Dec. 1927 – June 1932	1921-07-03
Jingu Tianjin	津沽市 天津市	Jingu Hebei Tianjin	Special (de jure) Province-controlled (claimed) Yuan-controlled Direct-controlled	3 July 1921 – 29 December 1928 6 Oct. 1923 – 20 June 1928; Dec. 1930 – June 1935 20 June 1928 – 30 May 1930 30 May 1930 – Dec. 1930; June 1935 – 1 October 1949	1921-07-03
Jiangmen	江門市 (江门市)	Guangdong	Province-controlled	Aug. 1925 – Feb. 1931	1925-08-
Foshan	佛山市	Guangdong	Province-controlled	1925–1927	1925– -
Jiujiang	九江市	Guangdong	Province-controlled	1925–1936	1925– -
Beihai	北海市	Guangdong	Province-controlled	1925 – May 1930	1925– -
Hankou Wuhan Hankou	漢口市 (汉口市) 武漢市 (武汉市) 漢口市 (汉口市)	Hankou Hubei Wuhan Hankou	Special (de jure) Province-controlled (de facto) Yuan-controlled Direct-controlled	3 July 1921 – 29 December 1928 Oct. 1926-10 – Apr. 1927; Jan. 1929 – Apr. 1929; July 1931 – 7 June 1947 Apr. 1927 – Jan. 1929 Apr. 1929 – 30 May 1930 30 May 1930 – July 1931; 7 June 1947 – 1 October 1949	1921-07-03
Haikou	海口市	Guangdong	Province-controlled	Dec. 1926 – Feb. 1931; Apr. 1949 – 1 October 1949	1926-12-
Chencun	陳村市 (陈村市)	Guangdong	Province-controlled	1926 (failed)	(failed)
Meilu	梅菉市	Guangdong	Province-controlled	1926–1932	1926– -
Wuhu	蕪湖市 (芜湖市)	Anhui	Province-controlled	1927 – Mar. 1930	1927– -
Songhu Shanghai	淞滬市 (淞沪市) 上海市	Songhu Shanghai	Special (de jure) Yuan-controlled (de facto) Direct-controlled	3 July 1921 – 29 December 1928 Mar. 1927 – 30 May 1930 30 May 1930 – 1 October 1949	1921-07-03
Jiujiang	九江市	Jiangxi	Province-controlled	Mar. 1927 – Sep. 1930	1927-03-
Zigong	自貢市 (自贡市)	Sichuan	Province-controlled	Mar. 1927 – 1 October 1949	1927-03-
Chongqing	重慶市 (重庆市)	Sichuan	Province-controlled Direct-controlled	Mar. 1927 – 5 May 1939 5 May 1939 – 1 October 1949	1927-03-
Nanjing	南京市	Nanjing	Yuan-controlled Direct-controlled	May 1927 – 30 May 1930 30 May 1930 – 1 October 1949	1927-05-
Shilong	石龍市 (石龙市)	Guangdong	Province-controlled	Aug. 1927 (failed)	(failed)
Zhengzhou	鄭州市 (郑州市)	Henan	Province-controlled	1928–1931	1928– -
Xijing / Xi'an	西京市 西安市	Shaanxi Xijing Xi'an	Province-controlled Direct-controlled	1928 – 7 June 1947 1933 (failed) 7 June 1947 – 1 October 1949	1928– -
Changsha	長沙市 (长沙市)	Hunan	Province-controlled	Jan. 1928 – 1 October 1949	1928-01-
Liuzhou	柳州市	Guangxi	Province-controlled	Apr. 1928– Oct. 1928	1928-04-
Nanning	南寧市 (南宁市)	Guangxi	Province-controlled	Apr. 1928 – Oct. 1932	1928-04-
Kunming	昆明市	Yunnan	Province-controlled	Aug. 1928 – 1 October 1949	1928-08-
Wanxian	萬縣市 (万县市)	Sichuan	Province-controlled	Nov. 1928 – 1935	1928-11-
Suzhou	蘇州市 (苏州市)	Jiangsu	Province-controlled	Nov. 1928 – Apr. 1930	1928-11-
Kaifeng	開封市 (开封市)	Henan	Province-controlled	1929–1930	1929– -
Guilin	桂林市	Guangxi	Province-controlled	Nov. 1932 (failed); June 1940 – 1944; 1945 – 1 October 1949	1940– -
Baotou	包頭市 (包头市)	Suiyuan	Province-controlled	Apr. 1933 – 1 October 1949	1933-04-
Fuzhou	福州市	Fujian	Province-controlled	May 1933 – July 1934; Jan. 1946 – 1 October 1949	1933-05-
Lianyun	連雲市 (连云市)	Jiangsu	Province-controlled	Feb. 1935 – 1 October 1949	1935-02-
Xiamen	廈門市 (厦门市)	Fujian	Province-controlled	Apr. 1935 – 1 October 1949	1935-04-
Lanzhou	蘭州市 (兰州市)	Gansu	Province-controlled	May 1941 – 1 October 1949	1941-05-
Hengyang	衡陽市 (衡阳市)	Hunan	Province-controlled	July 1941 – 1 October 1949	1941-07-
Guiyang	貴陽市 (贵阳市)	Guizhou	Province-controlled	July 1941 – 1 October 1949	1941-07-
Taiyuan	太原市	Shanxi	Province-controlled	Nov. 1941 – 1 October 1949	1941-11-
Shanba	陝壩市 (陕坝市)	Suiyuan	Province-controlled	Mar. 1943 – 1 October 1949	1943-03-
Shaoguan	韶關市 (韶关市)	Guangdong	Province-controlled	Oct. 1943 – 1944	1943-10-
Yinchuan	銀川市 (银川市)	Ningxia	Province-controlled	Jan. 1944 – 1 October 1949	1944-01-
Weihaiwei	威海衛市 (威海卫市)	Shandong	Province-controlled	1945 – 1 October 1949	1945– -
Dihua	迪化市	Xinjiang	Province-controlled	Aug. 1945 – 1 October 1949	1945-08-
Zhanjiang	湛江市	Guangdong	Province-controlled	Sep. 1945 – 1 October 1949	1945-09-
Xuzhou	徐州市	Jiangsu	Province-controlled	Oct. 1945 – 1 October 1949	1945-10-
Xining	西宁市	Qinghai	Province-controlled	Nov. 1945 – 1 October 1949	1945-11-
Keelung	基隆市	Taiwan	Province-controlled	25 Oct. 1945 – … (List of cities in Taiwan)	1945-10-25
Hsinchu	新竹市	Taiwan	Province-controlled	25 Oct. 1945 – … (List of cities in Taiwan)	1945-10-25
Taichung	臺中市 (台中市)	Taiwan	Province-controlled	25 Oct. 1945 – … (List of cities in Taiwan)	1945-10-25
Chiayi City	嘉義市	Taiwan	Province-controlled	25 Oct. 1945 - … (List of cities in Taiwan)	1945-10-25
Tainan	臺南市 (台南市)	Taiwan	Province-controlled	25 Oct. 1945 – … (List of cities in Taiwan)	1945-10-25
Changhua City	彰化市	Taiwan	Province-controlled	25 Oct. 1945 – … (List of cities in Taiwan)	1945-10-25
Pingtung City	屏東市	Taiwan	Province-controlled	25 Oct. 1945 - … (List of cities in Taiwan)	1945-10-25
Taipei	臺北市 (台北市)	Taiwan	Province-controlled	25 Oct. 1945 – … (List of cities in Taiwan)	1945-10-25
Kaohsiung	高雄市	Taiwan	Province-controlled	25 Oct. 1945 -… (List of cities in Taiwan)	1945-10-25
Tangshan	唐山市	Hebei	Province-controlled	Apr. 1946 – 1 October 1949	1946-04-
Shimen	石門市 (石门市)	Hebei	Province-controlled	Apr. 1946 – 1 October 1949	1946-04-
Jinan	濟南市 (济南市)	Shandong	Province-controlled	Sep. 1946 – 1 October 1949	1946-09-
Yantai	煙臺市 (烟台市)	Shandong	Province-controlled	1947 – 1 October 1949	1947– -
Bengbu	蚌埠市	Anhui	Province-controlled	Apr. 1947 – 1 October 1949	1947-04-
Zhangyuan	張垣市 (张垣市)	Qahar	Province-controlled	June 1947 – 1 October 1949	1947-06-
Yingkou	營口市 (营口市)	Liaoning	Province-controlled	June 1947 – 1 October 1949	1947-06-
Lüshun	旅順市 (旅顺市)	Liaoning	Province-controlled	June 1947 – 1 October 1949	1947-06-
Tonghua	通化市	Andong	Province-controlled	June 1947 – 1 October 1949	1947-06-
Andong	安東市 (安东市)	Andong	Province-controlled	June 1947 – 1 October 1949	1947-06-
Siping	四平市	Liaobei	Province-controlled	June 1947 – 1 October 1949	1947-06-
Jilin	吉林市	Jilin	Province-controlled	June 1947 – 1 October 1949	1947-06-
Changchun	長春市 (长春市)	Jilin	Province-controlled	June 1947 – 1 October 1949	1947-06-
Mudanjiang	牡丹江市	Songjiang	Province-controlled	June 1947 – 1 October 1949	1947-06-
Yanji	延吉市	Songjiang	Province-controlled	June 1947 – 1 October 1949	1947-06-
Jiamusi	佳木斯市	Hejiang	Province-controlled	June 1947 – 1 October 1949	1947-06-
Bei'an	北安市	Heilongjiang	Province-controlled	June 1947 – 1 October 1949	1947-06-
Qiqihar	齊齊哈爾市 (齐齐哈尔市)	Nenjiang	Province-controlled	June 1947 – 1 October 1949	1947-06-
Hailar	海拉爾市 (海拉尔市)	Xing'an	Province-controlled	June 1947 – 1 October 1949	1947-06-
Dalian	大連市 (大连市)	Dalian	Direct-controlled	5 June 1947 – 1 October 1949	1947-06-05
Shenyang	瀋陽市 (沈阳市)	Shenyang	Direct-controlled	5 June 1947 – 1 October 1949	1947-06-05
Jinzhou	錦州市 (锦州市)	Liaoning	Province-controlled	July 1947 – 1 October 1949	1947-07-
Guisui	歸綏市 (归绥市)	Suiyuan	Province-controlled	Nov. 1947 – 1 October 1949	1947-11-

== See also ==
- List of capitals in China
- List of top Chinese cities by GDP
- List of top Chinese cities by GDP per capita
- List of prefecture-level divisions of China by GDP
- List of cities in China by population
- List of cities in the Republic of China (Taiwan)
- List of fu prefectures of China
- List of villages in China
