= List of capitals in China =

The scope of this list is limited to capital cities of first-level administrative divisions such as provinces, autonomous regions, municipalities, and special administrative regions, also including sub-provincial cities which are governed by a province but administered independently in many ways from a province.

== Provincial-level capitals ==
Provincial-level administrative divisions and capitals of China
Legend: Capital Direct-administered municipality East South West North Central Special Administrative Region (SAR)
- Note: The People's Republic of China claims Taiwan as one of its provinces, which it does not control.

Jurisdiction	Capital	Chinese	Capital since	Land area (km²)	Population (2020)	Urban area population (2020)	Symbol	Seat	Map
Anhui	Hefei	合肥市	1853	11,434	9,369,881	5,118,199	庐	Shushan	
Beijing (Municipality)	Beijing	北京市	1927	16,801	21,893,095	21,893,095	京	Tongzhou	
Chongqing (Municipality)	Chongqing	重庆市	1927	82,401	32,054,159	22,251,500	渝	Yuzhong	
Fujian	Fuzhou	福州市	1278	12,177	8,291,268	4,094,491	榕	Gulou	
Gansu	Lanzhou	兰州市	1667	13,300	4,359,446	3,072,100	兰	Chengguan	
Guangdong	Guangzhou	广州市	1369	7,434	18,676,605	16,492,590	穗	Yuexiu	
Guangxi (Autonomous region)	Nanning	南宁市	1912	22,189	8,741,584	5,977,185	邕	Qingxiu	
Guizhou	Guiyang	贵阳市	1413	8,034	5,987,018	4,506,134	筑	Guanshanhu	
Hainan	Haikou	海口市	1988	2,237	2,046,189	2,046,189	海	Xiuying	
Hebei	Shijiazhuang	石家庄市	1968	15,722	11,235,086	4,717,198	石	Chang'an	
Heilongjiang	Harbin	哈尔滨市	1949	53,100	10,009,854	7,152,381	哈	Songbei	
Henan	Zhengzhou	郑州市	1954	7,507	12,600,574	6,650,532	郑	Zhongyuan	
Hong Kong (Special administrative region)	Hong Kong	香港特别行政区	1997	1,104	7,481,800	7,481,800	港	Central & Western	
Hubei	Wuhan	武汉市	1927	8,494	12,326,500	12,326,500	汉	Jiang'an	
Hunan	Changsha	长沙市	1664	11,819	10,047,914	6,242,453	星	Yuelu	
Inner Mongolia (Autonomous region)	Hohhot	呼和浩特市	1952	17,224	3,446,100	2,681,758	呼	Xincheng	
Jiangsu	Nanjing	南京市	1952	6,598	9,314,685	9,314,685	宁	Xuanwu	
Jiangxi	Nanchang	南昌市	1277	7,372	6,255,007	3,929,660	洪	Honggutan	
Jilin	Changchun	长春市	1954	20,532	9,066,906	5,691,024	春	Nanguan	
Liaoning	Shenyang	沈阳市	1662	12,942	9,070,093	7,885,142	沈	Hunnan	
Macau (Special administrative region)	Macau	澳门特别行政区	1999	29	683,100	683,100	澳	São Lourenço	
Ningxia (Autonomous region)	Yinchuan	银川市	1928	4,467	2,859,074	1,901,793	银	Jinfeng	
Qinghai	Xining	西宁市	1928	7,372	2,467,965	1,954,795	湟	Chengzhong	
Shaanxi	Xi'an	西安市	1286	9,983	12,952,907	11,904,805	镐	Weiyang	
Shandong	Jinan	济南市	1377	8,177	9,202,432	8,352,574	济	Lixia	
Shanghai (Municipality)	Shanghai	上海市	1927	6,340	24,870,895	24,870,895	沪	Huangpu	
Shanxi	Taiyuan	太原市	1369	6,959	5,305,061	4,529,141	并	Xinghualing	
Sichuan	Chengdu	成都市	1286	12,132	20,937,757	15,419,445	蓉	Wuhou	
Tianjin (Municipality)	Tianjin	天津市	1927	11,760	13,866,009	10,932,000	津	Hexi	
Tibet (Autonomous region)	Lhasa	拉萨市	1642	29,274	867,891	648,044	拉	Chengguan	
Xinjiang (Autonomous region)	Ürümqi	乌鲁木齐市	1884	14,577	3,112,559	3,029,372	乌	Tianshan	
Yunnan	Kunming	昆明市	1275	21,473	8,460,088	5,604,310	昆	Chenggong	
Zhejiang	Hangzhou	杭州市	1367	16,847	11,936,010	10,711,238	杭	Jianggan	

== Sub-provincial cities that are not themselves provincial capitals ==
Sub-provincial cities have a status that is below that of the municipalities, which are independent and equivalent to provinces, but above other, regular prefecture-level cities, which are completely ruled by their respective provinces. However, these sub-provincial cities are marked the same as other provincial capitals (or a prefecture-level city if the city is not a provincial capital) on almost all maps.

In total, there are five sub-provincial cities that are not themselves provincial capitals. These five cities have been designated as "Cities with Independent Planning Status" (Chinese: 计划单列市; pinyin: Jìhuá Dānliè Shì).

=== List of the Cities with Independent Planning Status ===
Jurisdiction	City	Chinese	Designation	Land area (km²)	Population (2010)	Urban area population (2010)	Symbol	Seat	Map
Fujian	Xiamen	厦门市	1988	1,699	3,531,347	3,119,110	鹭	Siming	
Guangdong	Shenzhen	深圳市	1988	2,050	10,358,381	10,358,381	深	Futian	
Liaoning	Dalian	大连市	1984	13,237	8,106,171	4,222,409	连	Xigang	
Shandong	Qingdao	青岛市	1986	11,026	8,715,087	4,556,077	胶	Shinan	
Zhejiang	Ningbo	宁波市	1987	9,816	7,605,689	2,823,065	甬	Yinzhou	

With the exception of Fuzhou, the provincial capital of Fujian Province, the provincial capitals of the other four provinces listed above – Guangzhou, Shenyang, Jinan, and Hangzhou – are themselves sub-provincial cities. Before 1997, when Chongqing was a sub-provincial city of Sichuan Province, provincial capital Chengdu was also a sub-provincial city.

== See also ==
- List of former capitals of China
- List of former capitals of Chinese provinces
- List of cities in China
- List of cities in China by population
