= Gucheng =

Gucheng, formerly romanized as Ku Ch'eng, may refer to the following places in China:

== Gucheng meaning "old city/fort" (古城) ==
=== Communities ===
- Gucheng, Chengzhong, Chengzhong Subdistrict, Yingcheng, Xiaogan, Hubei

=== Counties ===
- Qitai County (formerly 古城) in the Changji Hui Autonomous Prefecture, Xinjiang, one of the more famous sites named Gucheng

=== Towns ===
- Gucheng, Bozhou, in Anhui
- Gucheng, Feidong County, in Anhui
- Gucheng, Fuchuan County, in Guangxi
- Gucheng, Luchuan County, in Guangxi
- Gucheng, Fujian
- Gucheng, Gansu, in Liangzhou District, Wuwei
- Gucheng, Fucheng County, in Hebei
- Gucheng, Keshan County, in Heilongjiang
- Gucheng, Linkou County, in Heilongjiang
- Gucheng, Xuchang, in Yuzhou, Henan
- Gucheng, Bayan Nur, in the Linhe District of Bayan Nur, Inner Mongolia
- Gucheng, Togtoh County, in Togtoh County, Inner Mongolia
- Gucheng, Jiangxi, in Jinggangshan City, Jiangxi
- Gucheng, Huanren County, in Liaoning
- Gucheng, Pengyang County, in Ningxia
- Gucheng, Wuzhong, in Litong District in Ningxia
- Gucheng, Luonan County, in Shaanxi
- Gucheng, Xixiang County, in Shaanxi
- Gucheng, Shen County, in Shandong
- Gucheng, Zhanhua County, in Shandong
- Gucheng, Shanyin County, in Shanxi
- Gucheng, Xiangfen County, in Shanxi
- Gucheng, Yanggao County, in Shanxi
- Gucheng, Yuanqu County, in Shanxi
- Gucheng, Pi County, in Sichuan
- Gucheng, Pingwu County, in Sichuan

=== Districts ===
- Gucheng District (古城区), Lijiang, Yunnan

=== Townships ===
- Gucheng Township, Huaiyuan County, in Anhui
- Gucheng Township, Yingshang County, in Anhui
- Changgucheng Township (长古城乡) in Baoding, Hebei
- Xigucheng Township in Xingtai, Hebei
- Gucheng Township, Da'an, Jilin
- Gucheng Township, Fugou County, in Henan
- Gucheng Township, Huaibin County, in Henan
- Gucheng Township, Luoyang, in Henan
- Gucheng Township, Qingfeng County, in Henan
- Gucheng Township, Tanghe County, in Henan
- Gucheng Township, Zhumadian, in Henan
- Gucheng Township, Qitai County, in Xinjiang

=== Subdistricts ===
- Gucheng Subdistrict, Beijing, in Shijingshan District, Beijing
- Gucheng Subdistrict, Dengzhou, in Dengzhou City, Henan
- Gucheng Subdistrict, Shangqiu, in Suiyang District, Shangqiu, Henan
- Gucheng Subdistrict, Suqian, in Sucheng District, Suqian, Jiangsu
- Gucheng Subdistrict, Dengta, in Dengta City, Liaoning
- Gucheng Subdistrict, Xingcheng, in Xingcheng City, Liaoning
- Gucheng Subdistrict, Shouguang, in Shouguang City, Shandong
- Gucheng Subdistrict, Taiyuan, in Jiancaoping District, Taiyuan, Shanxi
- Gucheng Subdistrict, Linhai, in Linhai City, Zhejiang

=== Metro Stations ===
- Gucheng station, a station on Line 1 of the Beijing Subway

== Gucheng meaning "former city" (故城) ==
=== Counties ===
- Gucheng County, Hebei (故城县), in Hengshui, Hebei

=== Towns ===
- Gucheng, Gucheng County, Hebei (故城镇)
- Gucheng, Wuxiang County (故城镇) in Shanxi

== Other forms ==
- Gucheng County, Hubei (谷城县), in Xiangyang, Hubei
- Gucheng, Longyao County (固城镇) in Hebei
- Gucheng Township, Li County (固城乡), in Gansu
- Gǔcheng Township, Qingfeng County (固城乡), in Henan
