= Hengzhou, Guangxi =

Hengzhou 横州市 · Hwngzcouh Si
- County-level city
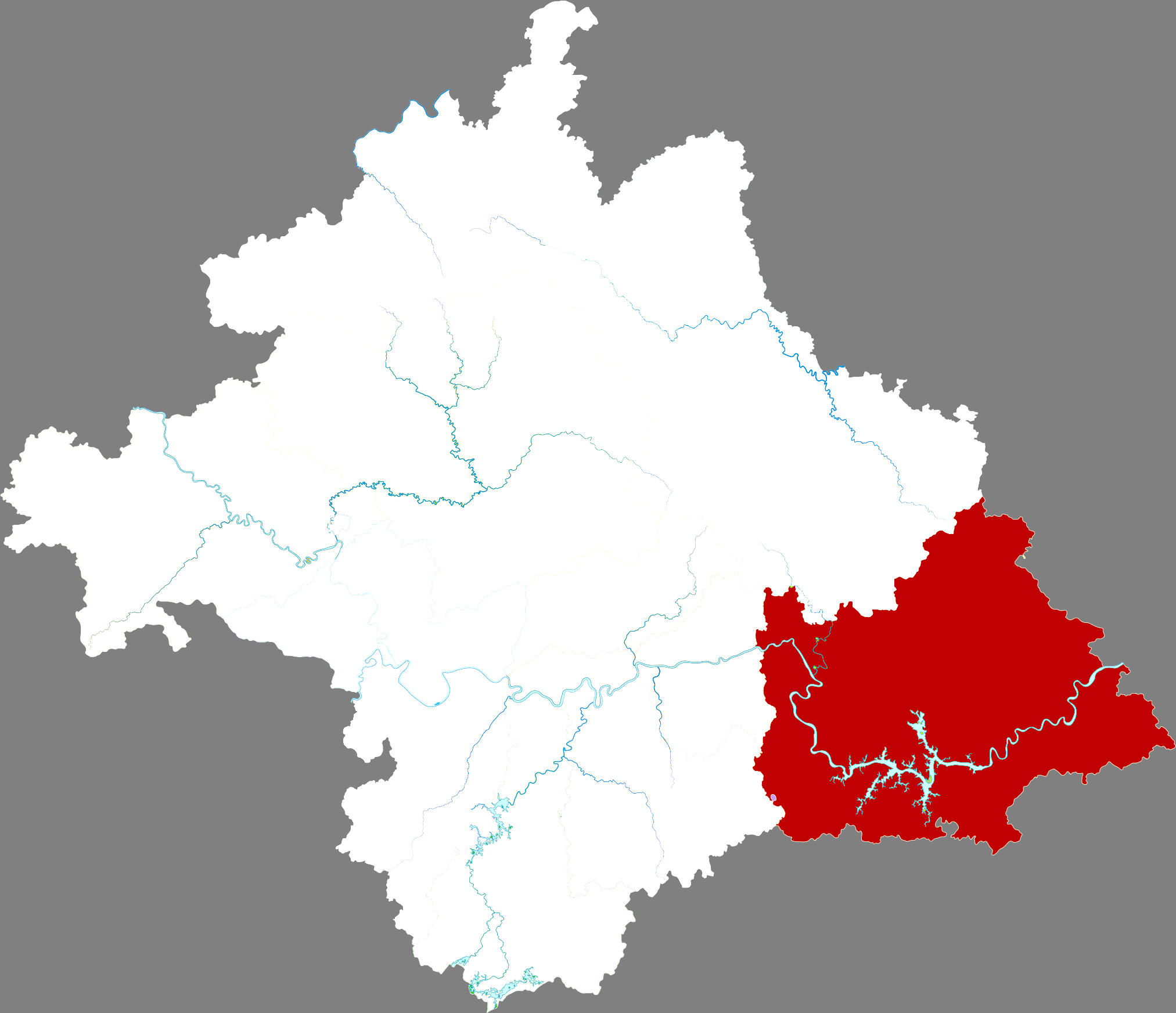
- Location in Nanning

- Location of the seat in Guangxi
- Coordinates: 22°40′48″N 109°15′41″E
- Country: China
- Autonomous region: Guangxi
- Prefecture-level city: Nanning
- Municipal seat: Hengzhou (横州镇)

Area
  - Total: 3,464 km^{2} (1,337 sq mi)
- Elevation: 56 m (184 ft)

Population (2010)
  - Total: 863,001
  - Density: 249.1/km^{2} (645.3/sq mi)
- Time zone: UTC+8 (China Standard)
- Postal code: 5303XX

Hengzhou (Chinese: 横州; pinyin: Héngzhōu Shì), formerly Heng County or Hengxian (simplified Chinese: 横县; traditional Chinese: 橫縣; pinyin: Héng Xiàn; Standard Zhuang: Hwngz Yen), is a county-level city of Guangxi Zhuang Autonomous Region, China. It is under the administration of the prefecture-level city of Nanning, the capital of Guangxi, with a permanent population of 863,001, and a Hukou population of 1,200,521 as of the 2010 Census.

The easternmost county-level division of Nanning City, it borders the prefecture-level cities of Guigang to the northeast, Yulin to the east, and Qinzhou to the south. The county-level city was approved and elevated by the former Heng County by the State Council on February 3, 2021.

60% speak Pinghua as their mother tongue and a further 30% speak Pingua as a second language.

== Administrative divisions ==
There are 16 towns and 1 township in the county-level city:

Towns:

- Hengzhou (横州镇), Luancheng (峦城镇), Liujing (六景镇), Shitang (石塘镇), Taoxu (陶圩镇), Xiaoyi (校椅镇), Yunbiao (云表镇), Baihe (百合镇), Nayang (那阳镇), Nanxiang (南乡镇), Xinfu (新福镇), Liantang (莲塘镇), Pingma (平马镇), Maling (马岭镇), Mashan (马山镇), Pinglang (平朗镇)

Township:

- Zhenlong Township (镇龙乡)

== Climate ==
Climate data for Hengzhou, elevation 89 m (292 ft), (1991–2020 normals, extremes 1981–present)
Month	Jan	Feb	Mar	Apr	May	Jun	Jul	Aug	Sep	Oct	Nov	Dec	Year
Record high °C (°F)	28.5 (83.3)	32.9 (91.2)	33.1 (91.6)	36.1 (97.0)	35.8 (96.4)	37.5 (99.5)	38.5 (101.3)	38.0 (100.4)	37.9 (100.2)	36.0 (96.8)	32.9 (91.2)	30.8 (87.4)	38.5 (101.3)
Mean daily maximum °C (°F)	16.5 (61.7)	18.5 (65.3)	21.1 (70.0)	26.6 (79.9)	30.4 (86.7)	32.0 (89.6)	32.8 (91.0)	32.8 (91.0)	31.5 (88.7)	28.5 (83.3)	24.2 (75.6)	19.0 (66.2)	26.2 (79.1)
Daily mean °C (°F)	12.4 (54.3)	14.5 (58.1)	17.3 (63.1)	22.5 (72.5)	26.1 (79.0)	27.8 (82.0)	28.3 (82.9)	28.1 (82.6)	26.7 (80.1)	23.5 (74.3)	19.1 (66.4)	14.2 (57.6)	21.7 (71.1)
Mean daily minimum °C (°F)	9.6 (49.3)	11.7 (53.1)	14.7 (58.5)	19.6 (67.3)	22.9 (73.2)	24.9 (76.8)	25.3 (77.5)	25.0 (77.0)	23.4 (74.1)	19.8 (67.6)	15.5 (59.9)	10.9 (51.6)	18.6 (65.5)
Record low °C (°F)	0.8 (33.4)	0.9 (33.6)	2.7 (36.9)	7.5 (45.5)	13.9 (57.0)	18.1 (64.6)	20.1 (68.2)	20.5 (68.9)	15.1 (59.2)	9.4 (48.9)	5.1 (41.2)	−0.5 (31.1)	−0.5 (31.1)
Average precipitation mm (inches)	53.2 (2.09)	45.2 (1.78)	86.6 (3.41)	98.0 (3.86)	192.1 (7.56)	259.7 (10.22)	273.9 (10.78)	220.5 (8.68)	139.5 (5.49)	72.3 (2.85)	62.3 (2.45)	41.3 (1.63)	1,544.6 (60.8)
Average precipitation days (≥ 0.1 mm)	10.3	11.0	15.8	13.5	15.4	17.6	17.7	16.6	11.3	6.4	7.0	7.4	150
Average relative humidity (%)	77	79	83	81	80	83	82	83	80	75	74	72	79
Mean monthly sunshine hours	68.4	55.4	47.8	83.2	137.0	134.1	178.2	180.8	174.5	172.2	137.3	113.8	1,482.7
Percentage possible sunshine	20	17	13	22	33	33	43	46	48	48	42	34	33
Source: China Meteorological Administrationall-time October record
