= List of semi-automatic train systems =

This is a list of current semi-automatic train systems capable of GoA2 as according to the Grade of Automation classifications specified by the standard IEC 62290‐1. These are explained diagrammatically by the UITP. For the systems capable of GoA3 and higher, see the list of driverless train systems. Canceled automated train systems are in the list of defunct automated train systems.

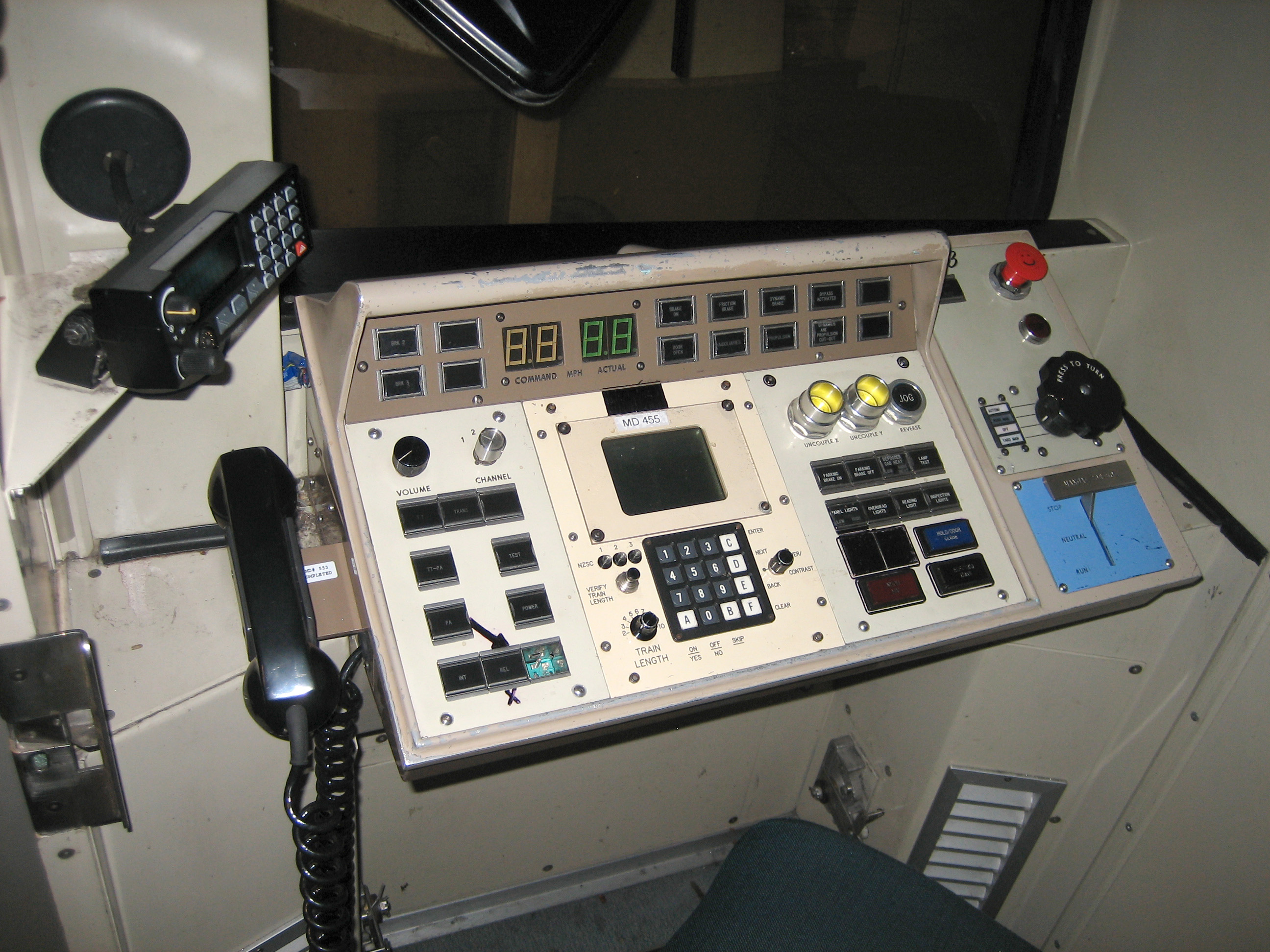
Control panel of a BART train, which has a black knob to allow the driver to switch between different modes of operation.

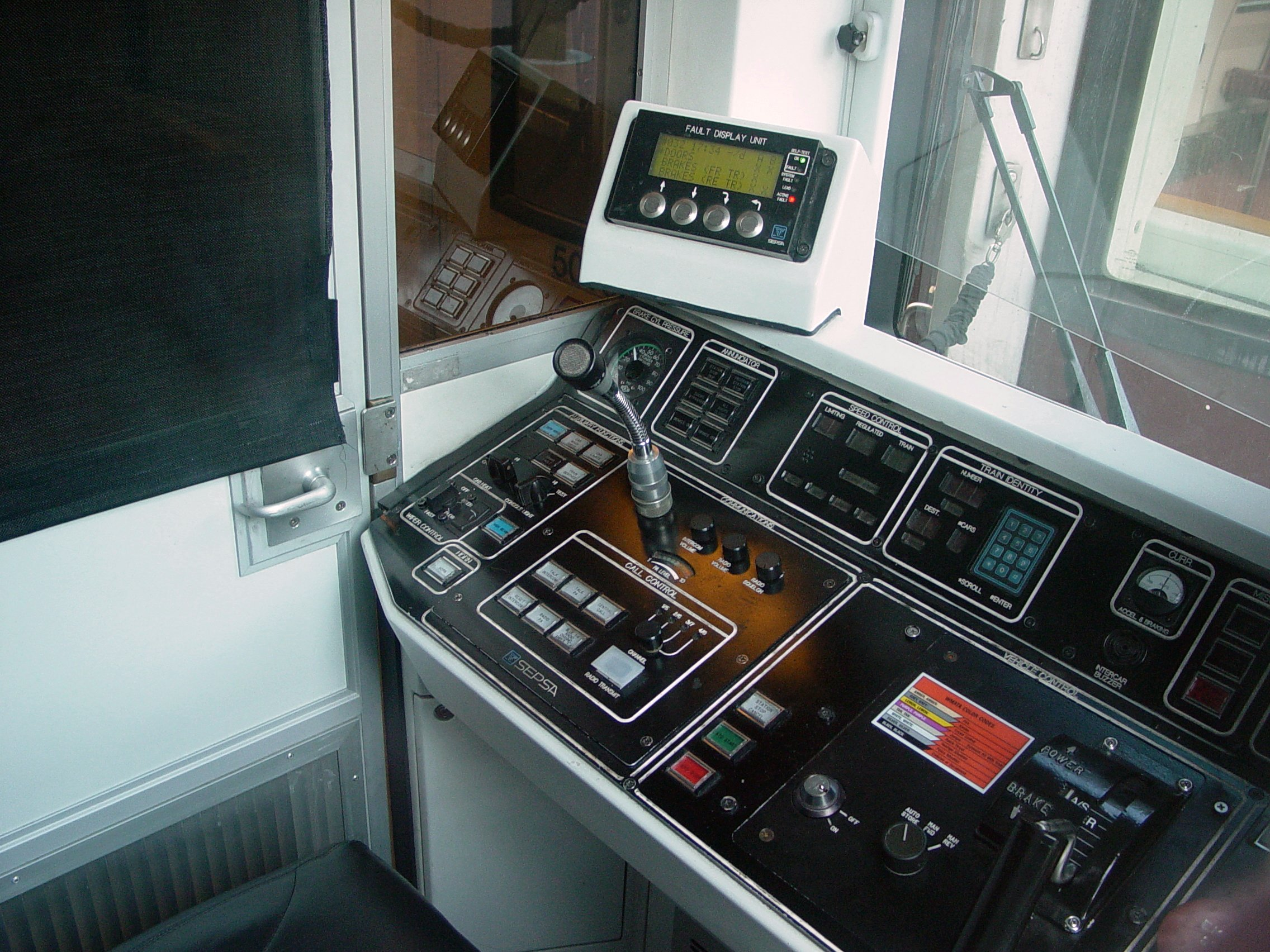
Much like BART, Washington Metro trains also have a rotary switch to allow the driver to switch between automatic and manual operation.

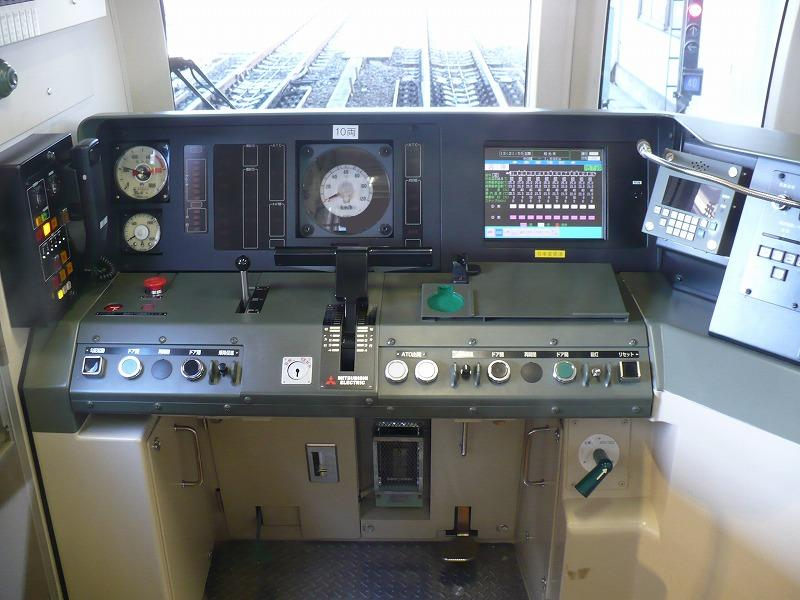
Control panel of a Tokyo Metro 10000 series train, which has a green lever to allow the driver to switch between different modes of operation. Two white ATO start buttons are also placed beside the master controller lever.

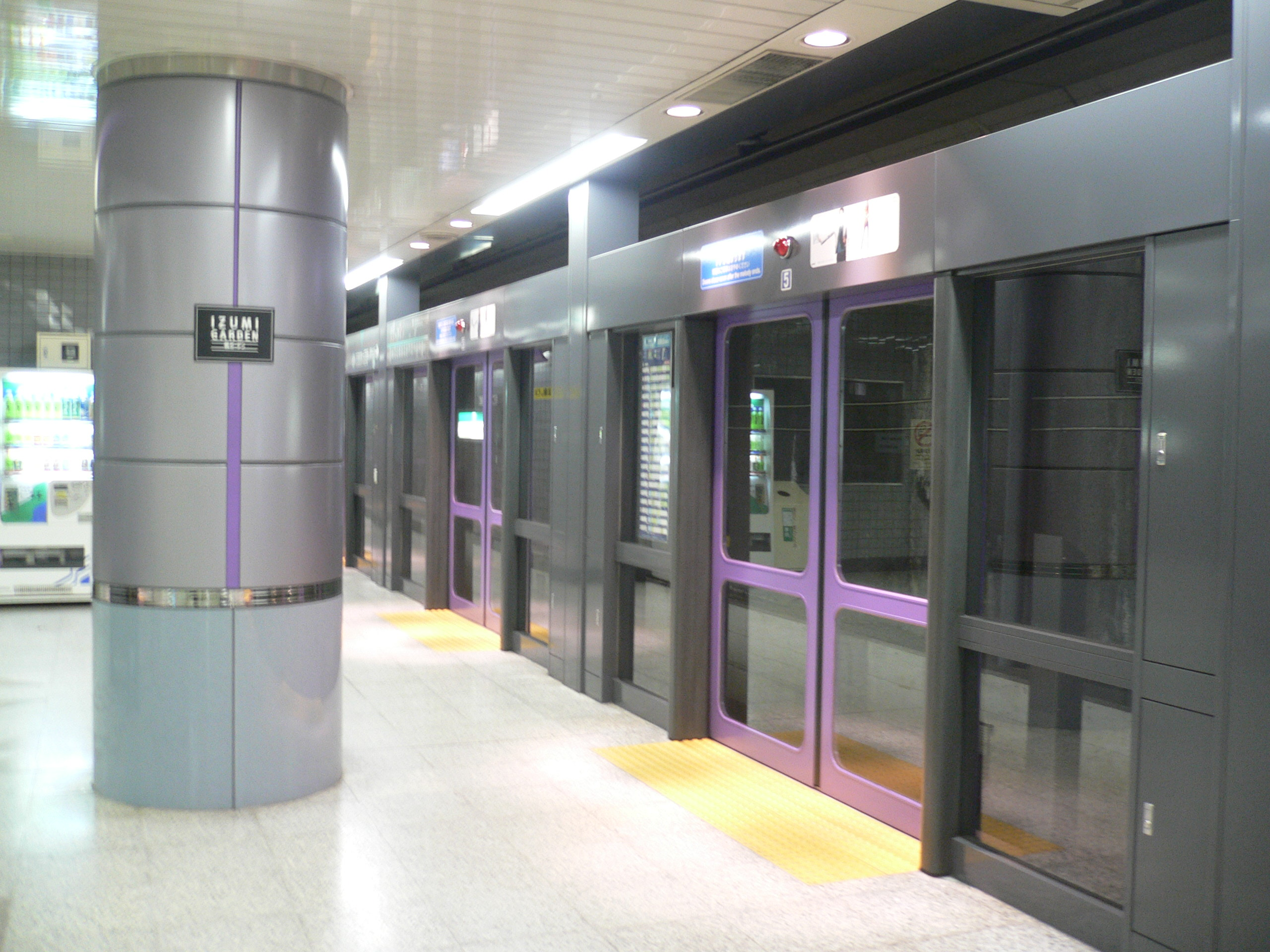
Many metro systems with automatic train operation, such as the Tokyo Metro Namboku Line, are equipped with platform screen doors

== Africa ==
Country/region	Name of system	Line	Date	System	Notes
Algeria	Algiers Metro	Line 1	1 November 2011	Siemens CBTC	

== Americas ==
Country/region	Name of system	Line	Date	System	Notes
Argentina	Buenos Aires Underground	Line C	2016	Siemens Trainguard MT CBTC	
Argentina	Buenos Aires Underground	Line H	2016	Siemens Trainguard MT CBTC	
Argentina	Buenos Aires Underground	Line D	2024	Siemens Trainguard MT CBTC	
Canada	Montreal Metro	Line 1 Green	1976		(Note: Converted from manual to automated operation)
Canada	Montreal Metro	Line 2 Orange	1976		(Note: Converted from manual to automated operation)
Canada	Montreal Metro	Line 5 Blue	1986		
Canada	O-Train	Line 1	14 September 2019	SelTrac	
Canada	Toronto subway	Line 1 Yonge–University	December 2017	Alstom Urbalis 400	(Note: Effective September 24, 2022, the entirety of Line 1 had been fully converted to automatic train control (ATC).)
Canada	Toronto subway	Line 5 Eglinton	February 2026	Bombardier CITYFLO 650	(Note: Between Mount Dennis and Laird stations)
Chile	Santiago Metro	Line 1	2012	Alstom Urbalis 400	CBTC implementation started on 2016
Chile	Santiago Metro	Line 4	2005	Alstom Urbalis 200	
Chile	Santiago Metro	Line 4A	2006	Alstom Urbalis 200	
Mexico	Guadalajara light rail system	Line 3	14 September 2020		
Mexico	Mexico City Metro	Line 12	30 October 2012	Alstom Urbalis 400	
Panama	Panama Metro	Line 1	6 April 2014	Alstom Urbalis 400	
Panama	Panama Metro	Line 2	25 April 2019	Alstom Urbalis 400	
Puerto Rico	Tren Urbano		19 December 2004		(Note: Entire system is fully automated, but can be over-ridden. Substations providing the power are remotely controlled from an operational control centre.)
United States	Bay Area Rapid Transit	Orange Line	11 September 1972	Westinghouse / Alstom	
United States	Bay Area Rapid Transit	Yellow Line	21 May 1973	Alstom / GRS / Westinghouse / Bombardier	
United States	Bay Area Rapid Transit	Green Line	16 August 1974	Alstom / Westinghouse	
United States	Bay Area Rapid Transit	Red Line	19 April 1976	Westinghouse / Bombardier	
United States	Bay Area Rapid Transit	Blue Line	10 May 1997	GRS / Westinghouse	
United States	Skyline		2023	Hitachi Rail Italy Driverless Metro	
United States	Los Angeles Metro Rail	B Line	1993	US&S	
United States	Los Angeles Metro Rail	C Line	1995	US&S	(Note: By the time the K Line opens, manual mode will be required from Aviation/Century to Expo/Crenshaw due to grade crossings and street running. The K Line will overlap most of the C Line east of Aviation/LAX.)
United States	Los Angeles Metro Rail	D Line	2006	US&S	
United States	MARTA rail	Red Line	1996		
United States	MARTA rail	Gold Line	1981		
United States	MARTA rail	Blue Line	1979		
United States	MARTA rail	Green Line	1992		
United States	Muni Metro	Market Street subway / Twin Peaks Tunnel	1997	SelTrac	(Note: Switch to automatic control while operating in the Market Street subway and in the Twin Peaks Tunnel. The operator manages the doors in-station and pilots the vehicle when running aboveground.)
United States	New York City Subway	BMT Canarsie Line (L train)	2012	Siemens Trainguard MT CBTC	
United States	New York City Subway	IRT Flushing Line (7 and <7> trains)	10 May 2019	Thales CBTC	
United States	PATCO Speedline	Between Philadelphia and New Jersey	4 January 1969		
United States	Walt Disney World Monorail System		22 June 2014		
United States	Washington Metro	Red Line	27 March 1976		(Note: Has an automated mode, where the driver is responsible for opening and closing of doors and of overriding the system. However, the system has been operating in manual mode since the June 2009 Washington Metro train collision, and plans are to operate in manual mode until newer railcars are delivered.)
United States	Washington Metro	Blue Line	1 July 1977		(Note: Has an automated mode, where the driver is responsible for opening and closing of doors and of overriding the system. However, the system has been operating in manual mode since the June 2009 Washington Metro train collision, and plans are to operate in manual mode until newer railcars are delivered.)
United States	Washington Metro	Orange Line	20 November 1978		(Note: Has an automated mode, where the driver is responsible for opening and closing of doors and of overriding the system. However, the system has been operating in manual mode since the June 2009 Washington Metro train collision, and plans are to operate in manual mode until newer railcars are delivered.)
United States	Washington Metro	Yellow Line	30 April 1983		(Note: Has an automated mode, where the driver is responsible for opening and closing of doors and of overriding the system. However, the system has been operating in manual mode since the June 2009 Washington Metro train collision, and plans are to operate in manual mode until newer railcars are delivered.)
United States	Washington Metro	Green Line	11 May 1991		(Note: Has an automated mode, where the driver is responsible for opening and closing of doors and of overriding the system. However, the system has been operating in manual mode since the June 2009 Washington Metro train collision, and plans are to operate in manual mode until newer railcars are delivered.)
United States	Washington Metro	Silver Line	26 July 2014		(Note: Has an automated mode, where the driver is responsible for opening and closing of doors and of overriding the system. However, the system has been operating in manual mode since the June 2009 Washington Metro train collision, and plans are to operate in manual mode until newer railcars are delivered.)

== Asia ==
Country/region	Name of system	Line	Date	System	Notes
China	Beijing Subway	Line 1	9 December 2015	CASCO/Alstom Urbalis 888	Previously used Westinghouse ATC in GoA1
China	Beijing Subway	Line 2	9 June 2008	CASCO/Alstom Urbalis 888	Previously used Westinghouse ATC in GoA1
China	Beijing Subway	Line 4	28 September 2009	SelTrac	
China	Beijing Subway	Line 5	7 October 2007	Westinghouse ATC	Newer BTCT LCF-300 will be added and interoperable with existing system
China	Beijing Subway	Line 6	30 December 2012	CASCO/Alstom Urbalis 888	
China	Beijing Subway	Line 7	28 December 2014	BTCT LCF-300	
China	Beijing Subway	Line 8	19 July 2008	CRSC FL300	
China	Beijing Subway	Line 9	31 December 2011	CASCO Urbalis 888	
China	Beijing Subway	Line 10	19 July 2008	Siemens Trainguard CBTC	
China	Beijing Subway	Line 11	31 December 2021		
China	Beijing Subway	Line 14	5 May 2013	BTCT LCF-300	
China	Beijing Subway	Line 15	30 December 2010	Nippon Signal SPARCS	
China	Beijing Subway	Line 16	31 December 2016	BTCT LCF-300	
China	Beijing Subway	Batong Line	3 November 2019	CASCO Urbalis 888	Previously used Westinghouse ATC in GoA1
China	Beijing Subway	Changping Line	30 December 2010	BTCT LCF-300	
China	Beijing Subway	Daxing Line	30 December 2010	SelTrac	
China	Beijing Subway	Fangshan Line	30 December 2010	CASCO/Alstom Urbalis 888	
China	Beijing Subway	Yizhuang Line	30 December 2010	BTCT LCF-300	
China	Beijing Subway	S1 Line	30 December 2017		
China	Changchun Rail Transit	Line 1	30 June 2017	CASCO Urbalis 888	
China	Changchun Rail Transit	Line 2	30 August 2018	CASCO Urbalis 888	
China	Changchun Rail Transit	Line 4	30 June 2011		
China	Changsha Maglev Express		6 May 2016		
China	Changsha Metro	Line 1	28 June 2016		
China	Changsha Metro	Line 2	29 April 2014		
China	Changsha Metro	Line 3	28 June 2020		
China	Changsha Metro	Line 4	26 May 2019		
China	Changsha Metro	Line 5	28 June 2020		
China	Changsha Metro	Line 6	28 June 2022		
China	Changzhou Metro	Line 1	21 September 2019	Bombardier CITYFLO 650	
China	Changzhou Metro	Line 2	28 June 2021		
China	Chengdu Metro	Line 1	27 September 2010	Ansaldo STS CBTC	
China	Chengdu Metro	Line 2	16 September 2012	Ansaldo STS CBTC	
China	Chengdu Metro	Line 3	31 July 2016	BTCT LCF-300	
China	Chengdu Metro	Line 4	26 December 2015	Alstom Urbalis 400	
China	Chengdu Metro	Line 5	27 December 2019	BTCT LCF-300	
China	Chengdu Metro	Line 6	18 December 2020		
China	Chengdu Metro	Line 7	6 December 2017	Alstom Urbalis 400	
China	Chengdu Metro	Line 8	18 December 2020		
China	Chengdu Metro	Line 10	6 September 2017	Ansaldo STS CBTC	
China	Chengdu Metro	Line 17	18 December 2020		
China	Chengdu Metro	Line 18	27 September 2020	CASCO Urbalis 888	
China	China Railway	Beijing–Zhangjiakou intercity railway	30 December 2019	CTCS-3+ATO	(Note: Only CR400BF-C trainsets support ATO.)
China	Chongqing Rail Transit	Loop Line	28 December 2018	BTCT LCF-300	Interoperable with other lines with Type As trainset despite different suppliers
China	Chongqing Rail Transit	Line 1	28 July 2011	Siemens Trainguard MT CBTC	
China	Chongqing Rail Transit	Line 3	29 September 2011	BTCT CBTC	
China	Chongqing Rail Transit	Line 4	28 December 2018	UniTTEC BiTRACON CBTC	Interoperable with other lines with Type As trainset despite different suppliers
China	Chongqing Rail Transit	Line 5	28 December 2017	CRSC FZL300	Interoperable with other lines with Type As trainset despite different suppliers
China	Chongqing Rail Transit	Line 6	28 September 2012	Siemens Trainguard MT CBTC	
China	Chongqing Rail Transit	Line 9	25 January 2022	CARS MTC-I	Interoperable with other lines with Type As trainset despite different suppliers
China	Chongqing Rail Transit	Line 10	28 December 2017	CARS MTC-I	Interoperable with other lines with Type As trainset despite different suppliers
China	Chongqing Rail Transit	Line 18	28 December 2023		
China	Dalian Metro	Line 1	30 October 2015	Ansaldo STS CBTC	
China	Dalian Metro	Line 2	22 May 2015	Ansaldo STS CBTC	
China	Dalian Metro	Line 5	17 March 2023		
China	Dalian Metro	Line 12	30 December 2013	CRSC	
China	Dalian Metro	Line 13	28 December 2021		
China	Dongguan Rail Transit	Line 1	28 November 2025		
China	Dongguan Rail Transit	Line 2	27 May 2016	SelTrac CBTC	
China	Foshan Metro	Line 1	3 November 2010	Siemens Trainguard MT CBTC	
China	Foshan Metro	Line 2	28 December 2021		
China	Foshan Metro	Line 3	28 December 2022		
China	Fuzhou Metro	Line 1	18 May 2016	Siemens Trainguard MT CBTC	
China	Fuzhou Metro	Line 2	26 April 2019	Siemens Trainguard MT CBTC	
China	Fuzhou Metro	Line 5	29 April 2022		
China	Fuzhou Metro	Line 6	28 August 2022		
China	Guangzhou Metro	Line 1	28 June 1997	Siemens LZB 700M	
China	Guangzhou Metro	Line 2	25 September 2010	Siemens LZB 700M	
China	Guangzhou Metro	Line 3	26 December 2005	SelTrac	
China	Guangzhou Metro	Line 4	26 December 2005	Siemens Trainguard MT CBTC	
China	Guangzhou Metro	Line 5	28 December 2009	Siemens Trainguard MT CBTC	
China	Guangzhou Metro	Line 6	28 December 2013	CASCO Urbalis 888	
China	Guangzhou Metro	Line 7	28 December 2016	CARS MTC-I	
China	Guangzhou Metro	Line 8	25 September 2010	Siemens LZB 700M	
China	Guangzhou Metro	Line 9	28 December 2017	SelTrac	
China	Guangzhou Metro	Line 13	28 December 2017	CASCO Urbalis 888	
China	Guangzhou Metro	Line 14	28 December 2017	SelTrac	
China	Guangzhou Metro	Line 18	28 September 2021		
China	Guangzhou Metro	Line 21	28 December 2018	SelTrac	
China	Guangzhou Metro	Line 22	31 March 2022		
China	Guiyang Metro	Line 1	28 December 2017	BTCT LCF-300	
China	Guiyang Metro	Line 2	28 April 2021		
China	Guiyang Metro	Line 3	16 December 2023		
China	Guiyang Metro	Line S1	28 December 2024		
China	Harbin Metro	Line 1	26 September 2013	Kyosan	
China	Harbin Metro	Line 2	19 September 2021		
China	Harbin Metro	Line 3	26 January 2017		
China	Hangzhou Metro	Line 1	24 November 2012	Ansaldo STS CBTC	
China	Hangzhou Metro	Line 2	24 November 2014	Ansaldo STS CBTC	
China	Hangzhou Metro	Line 3	21 February 2022		
China	Hangzhou Metro	Line 4	2 February 2015	UniTTEC BiTRACON CBTC	
China	Hangzhou Metro	Line 5	24 June 2019	UniTTEC BiTRACON CBTC	
China	Hangzhou Metro	Line 6	30 December 2020		
China	Hangzhou Metro	Line 7	30 December 2020		
China	Hangzhou Metro	Line 8	28 June 2021	CASCO Urbalis 888	
China	Hangzhou Metro	Line 9	10 July 2021		
China	Hangzhou Metro	Line 10	21 February 2022		
China	Hangzhou Metro	Line 16	23 April 2020	SelTrac CBTC	
China	Hangzhou Metro	Line 19	22 September 2022		
China	Hangzhou Metro	Hangzhou–Haining intercity railway	28 June 2021		
China	Hefei Metro	Line 1	26 December 2016	SelTrac CBTC	
China	Hefei Metro	Line 2	26 December 2017		
China	Hefei Metro	Line 3	26 December 2019	CRSC FZL-300	
China	Hefei Metro	Line 4	26 December 2021		
China	Hefei Metro	Line 5	26 December 2020		
China	Hohhot Metro	Line 1	29 December 2019	CASCO Urbalis 888	
China	Hohhot Metro	Line 2	1 October 2020		
China	Jinan Metro	Line 1	1 April 2019		
China	Jinan Metro	Line 2	26 March 2021		
China	Jinan Metro	Line 3	28 December 2019	CASCO Urbalis 888	
China	Kunming Metro	Line 1	20 May 2013	CASCO/Alstom Urbalis 888	
China	Kunming Metro	Line 2	30 April 2014	CASCO/Alstom Urbalis 888	
China	Kunming Metro	Line 3	29 August 2017	CASCO Urbalis 888	
China	Kunming Metro	Line 4	23 September 2020		
China	Kunming Metro	Line 5	29 June 2022		
China	Kunming Metro	Line 6	29 August 2017	CASCO Urbalis 888	
China	Lanzhou Metro	Line 1	23 June 2019	CASCO Urbalis 888	
China	Lanzhou Metro	Line 2	29 June 2023	CASCO Urbalis 888	
China	Luoyang Subway	Line 1	28 March 2021		
China	Luoyang Subway	Line 2	26 December 2021	CASCO Urbalis 888	
China	Nanchang Metro	Line 1	26 December 2015	SelTrac CBTC	
China	Nanchang Metro	Line 2	18 August 2017	SelTrac CBTC	
China	Nanchang Metro	Line 3	26 December 2020		
China	Nanchang Metro	Line 4	26 December 2021		
China	Nanjing Metro	Line 1	3 September 2005	Siemens LZB 700 M	
China	Nanjing Metro	Line 2	28 May 2010	Siemens Trainguard MT CBTC	
China	Nanjing Metro	Line 3	1 April 2015	Siemens Trainguard MT CBTC	
China	Nanjing Metro	Line 4	18 January 2017		
China	Nanjing Metro	Line 10	1 July 2014	Siemens LZB 700M	
China	Nanjing Metro	Line S1	1 July 2014	SelTrac CBTC	
China	Nanjing Metro	Line S3	6 December 2017		
China	Nanjing Metro	Line S6	28 December 2021		
China	Nanjing Metro	Line S7	26 May 2018	SelTrac CBTC	
China	Nanjing Metro	Line S8	1 August 2014	CASCO Urbalis 888	
China	Nanjing Metro	Line S9	30 December 2017	Siemens Trainguard MT CBTC	
China	Nanning Metro	Line 1	28 June 2016	CASCO Urbalis 888	
China	Nanning Metro	Line 2	28 December 2017	CASCO Urbalis 888	
China	Nanning Metro	Line 3	6 June 2019	CASCO Urbalis 888	
China	Nanning Metro	Line 4	23 November 2020		
China	Nantong Metro	Line 1	10 November 2022		
China	Nantong Metro	Line 2	27 December 2023	CASCO Urbalis 888	
China	Ningbo Rail Transit	Line 1	30 May 2014	Alstom Urbalis 400	
China	Ningbo Rail Transit	Line 2	26 September 2015	Alstom Urbalis 400	
China	Ningbo Rail Transit	Line 3	30 June 2019		
China	Ningbo Rail Transit	Line 4	23 December 2020		
China	Pearl River Delta Metropolitan Region intercity railway	Guangzhu ICR	7 January 2011	CASCO INTXIS	Within CTCS-2 framework, plus ATO function
China	Pearl River Delta Metropolitan Region intercity railway	Guanhui ICR	30 March 2016	CASCO INTXIS	Within CTCS-2 framework, plus ATO function
China	Pearl River Delta Metropolitan Region intercity railway	Guangfozhao ICR	30 March 2016	CASCO INTXIS	Within CTCS-2 framework, plus ATO function
China	Pearl River Delta Metropolitan Region intercity railway	Suishen ICR	15 December 2019	CASCO INTXIS	Within CTCS-2 framework, plus ATO function
China	Pearl River Delta Metropolitan Region intercity railway	Zhuji ICR	18 August 2020	CASCO INTXIS	Within CTCS-2 framework, plus ATO function
China	Pearl River Delta Metropolitan Region intercity railway	Guangqing ICR	30 November 2020	CASCO INTXIS	Within CTCS-2 framework, plus ATO function
China	Pearl River Delta Metropolitan Region intercity railway	Guangzhou East Ring ICR	30 November 2020	CASCO INTXIS	Within CTCS-2 framework, plus ATO function
China	Pearl River Delta Metropolitan Region intercity railway	Palian ICR	29 September 2025	CASCO INTXIS	Within CTCS-2 framework, plus ATO function
China	Qingdao Metro	Line 1	24 December 2020		
China	Qingdao Metro	Line 2	10 December 2017		
China	Qingdao Metro	Line 3	16 December 2015		
China	Qingdao Metro	Line 4	26 December 2022		
China	Qingdao Metro	Line 8	24 December 2020		
China	Qingdao Metro	Oceantec Valley Line	23 April 2018	CASCO Urbalis 888	
China	Qingdao Metro	West Coast Line	26 December 2018		
China	Shanghai Maglev Train		2004	Transrapid	
China	Shanghai Metro	Line 1	1995	General Railway Signal Micro Cabmatic	
China	Shanghai Metro	Line 2	11 June 2000	Union Switch & Signal International MicroCab	(Note: Newer trains (since 2019) use an on-board system jointly developed by CASCO and Hitachi Rail STS. Interoperable with both CBTC and the existing track circuit based signal system.)
China	Shanghai Metro	Line 3	26 December 2000	SACEM/Urbalis 200	
China	Shanghai Metro	Line 4	31 December 2005	SACEM/Urbalis 200	
China	Shanghai Metro	Line 6	2011	Seltrac	
China	Shanghai Metro	Line 7	2010	Seltrac	
China	Shanghai Metro	Line 8	2011	Seltrac	
China	Shanghai Metro	Line 9	2011	Seltrac	
China	Shanghai Metro	Line 11	2012	Seltrac	
China	Shanghai Metro	Line 12	29 December 2013	CASCO Urbalis 888	
China	Shanghai Metro	Line 13	20 April 2010	CASCO Urbalis 888	
China	Shanghai Metro	Line 16	29 December 2013	CASCO Urbalis 888	
China	Shaoxing Metro	Line 1	28 June 2021		
China	Shenyang Metro	Line 1	27 September 2010	Ansaldo STS CBTC	
China	Shenyang Metro	Line 2	9 January 2012	Ansaldo STS CBTC	
China	Shenyang Metro	Line 3	30 December 2024		
China	Shenyang Metro	Line 4	29 September 2023		
China	Shenyang Metro	Line 9	25 May 2019	CASCO Urbalis 888	
China	Shenyang Metro	Line 10	29 April 2020		
China	Shenzhen Metro	Line 1	28 December 2004	Siemens LZB 700M	
China	Shenzhen Metro	Line 2	28 December 2010	CASCO/Alstom Urbalis 888	
China	Shenzhen Metro	Line 3	28 December 2010	Bombardier CITYFLO 650	
China	Shenzhen Metro	Line 4	28 December 2004	Siemens LZB 700M	
China	Shenzhen Metro	Line 5	22 June 2011	CASCO Urbalis 888	
China	Shenzhen Metro	Line 6	18 August 2020	CASCO Urbalis 888	
China	Shenzhen Metro	Line 7	28 October 2016	BTCT LCF-300	
China	Shenzhen Metro	Line 8	28 October 2020	CASCO Urbalis 888	
China	Shenzhen Metro	Line 9	28 October 2016	SelTrac CBTC	
China	Shenzhen Metro	Line 10	18 August 2020	BTCT LCF-300	
China	Shenzhen Metro	Line 11	28 June 2016	CASCO/Alstom Urbalis 888	
China	Shijiazhuang Metro	Line 1	26 June 2017		
China	Shijiazhuang Metro	Line 2	26 August 2020		
China	Shijiazhuang Metro	Line 3	26 June 2017		
China	Suzhou Metro	Line 1	28 April 2012		
China	Suzhou Metro	Line 2	28 December 2013		
China	Suzhou Metro	Line 3	25 December 2019	CASCO Urbalis 888	
China	Suzhou Metro	Line 4	15 April 2017	CASCO Urbalis 888	
China	Taiyuan Metro	Line 1	22 February 2025		
China	Tianjin Metro	Line 1	12 June 2006		
China	Tianjin Metro	Line 2	1 July 2012	Bombardier CITYFLO 650	
China	Tianjin Metro	Line 3	1 October 2012	Bombardier CITYFLO 650	
China	Tianjin Metro	Line 4	28 December 2021		
China	Tianjin Metro	Line 5	22 October 2018		
China	Tianjin Metro	Line 6	6 August 2016		
China	Tianjin Metro	Line 9	28 March 2006		
China	Ürümqi Metro	Line 1	25 October 2018		
China	Wenzhou Rail Transit	Line S1	23 January 2019		
China	Wenzhou Rail Transit	Line S2	26 August 2023		
China	Wuhan Metro	Line 1	28 July 2004	SelTrac	
China	Wuhan Metro	Line 2	28 December 2012	CASCO/Alstom Urbalis 888	
China	Wuhan Metro	Line 3	28 December 2015		
China	Wuhan Metro	Line 4	28 December 2013	Alstom Urbalis 400	
China	Wuhan Metro	Line 6	28 December 2016	CASCO/Alstom Urbalis 888	
China	Wuhan Metro	Line 7	1 October 2018		
China	Wuhan Metro	Line 8	26 December 2017	CASCO Urbalis 888	
China	Wuhan Metro	Line 11	1 October 2018		
China	Wuhan Metro	Line 16	26 December 2021		
China	Wuxi Metro	Line 1	1 July 2014	Alstom Urbalis 400	
China	Wuxi Metro	Line 2	28 December 2014	Alstom Urbalis 400	
China	Wuxi Metro	Line 3	28 October 2020		
China	Wuxi Metro	Line 4	17 December 2021		
China	Wuxi Metro	Line S1	31 January 2024		
China	Xi'an Metro	Line 1	15 September 2013	Siemens Trainguard MT CBTC	
China	Xi'an Metro	Line 2	16 September 2011	Ansaldo STS CBTC	
China	Xi'an Metro	Line 3	8 November 2016		
China	Xi'an Metro	Line 4	26 December 2018	CASCO Urbalis 888	
China	Xi'an Metro	Line 5	28 December 2020		
China	Xi'an Metro	Line 6	28 December 2020		
China	Xi'an Metro	Line 9	28 December 2020		
China	Xi'an Metro	Line 14	29 September 2019		
China	Xiamen Metro	Line 1	31 December 2017	CASCO Urbalis 888	
China	Xiamen Metro	Line 2	25 December 2019	CASCO Urbalis 888	
China	Xiamen Metro	Line 3	25 June 2021		
China	Xuzhou Metro	Line 1	28 September 2019		
China	Xuzhou Metro	Line 2	28 November 2020		
China	Xuzhou Metro	Line 3	28 June 2021		
China	Zhengzhou Metro	Line 1	28 December 2013		
China	Zhengzhou Metro	Line 2	19 August 2016	CASCO/Alstom Urbalis 888	
China	Zhengzhou Metro	Line 3	26 December 2020		
China	Zhengzhou Metro	Line 4	26 December 2020		
China	Zhengzhou Metro	Line 5	20 May 2019	CASCO Urbalis 888	
China	Zhengzhou Metro	Line 6	30 September 2022		
China	Zhengzhou Metro	Line 14	19 September 2019	CASCO TRANAVI	
China	Zhengzhou Metro	Chengjiao Line	12 January 2017	CASCO Urbalis 888	
Hong Kong	MTR	Kwun Tong line	1 October 1979	SACEM	(Note: Same system as Paris RER line A)
Hong Kong	MTR	Tsuen Wan line	17 May 1982	SACEM	(Note: Same system as Paris RER line A)
Hong Kong	MTR	Island line	31 May 1985	SACEM	(Note: Same system as Paris RER line A)
Hong Kong	MTR	Tung Chung line	21 June 1998	SACEM	(Note: Same system as Paris RER line A)
Hong Kong	MTR	Airport Express	6 July 1998	SACEM	(Note: Same system as Paris RER line A)
Hong Kong	MTR	Tseung Kwan O line	18 August 2002	SACEM	(Note: Same system as Paris RER line A)
Hong Kong	MTR	East Rail line	6 February 2021	Siemens Trainguard MT CBTC	Replaced the Alstom TBL system which used ATO since 2002
Hong Kong	MTR	West Rail line	20 December 2003	SelTrac	
Hong Kong	MTR	Ma On Shan line	21 December 2004	SelTrac	
India	Ahmedabad Metro	East-West Corridor	4 March 2019	Nippon Signal SPARCS	
India	Ahmedabad Metro	North-South Line	6 October 2022	Nippon Signal SPARCS	
India	Chennai Metro	Blue Line	21 September 2016		
India	Chennai Metro	Green Line	25 September 2015		
India	Delhi Metro	Red Line	25 December 2002	Alstom Urbalis 200	(Note: Uses signalling systems supplied by Alstom.)
India	Delhi Metro	Yellow Line	20 December 2004	Alstom Urbalis 200	(Note: Uses signalling systems supplied by Alstom.)
India	Delhi Metro	Blue Line	31 December 2005	Siemens	(Note: Uses LZB 700 signalling systems supplied by Siemens.)
India	Delhi Metro	Green Line	3 April 2010	Bombardier CITYFLO 350	
India	Delhi Metro	Violet Line	3 October 2010	Bombardier CITYFLO 350	
India	Delhi Metro	Airport Express	23 February 2011	Bombardier CITYFLO 350	
India	Hyderabad Metro	Red Line	28 November 2017	SelTrac	(Note: Line partially opened)
India	Hyderabad Metro	Blue Line	28 November 2017	SelTrac	(Note: Line partially opened)
India	Hyderabad Metro	Green Line	7 February 2020	SelTrac	(Note: Line partially opened)
India	Kanpur Metro	Orange Line	28 December 2021	Bombardier CITYFLO 650	
India	Kochi Metro	Line 1	17 June 2017	Alstom Urbalis 400	
India	Kolkata Metro	Blue Line			
India	Kolkata Metro	Green Line	13 February 2020	Ansaldo STS CBTC	
India	Kolkata Metro	Purple Line	30 December 2022		
India	Kolkata Metro	Orange Line	6 March 2024		
India	Kolkata Metro	Yellow Line	22 August 2025		
India	Lucknow Metro	Red Line	5 September 2017	Alstom Urbalis 400	
India	Mumbai Metro	Line 1	8 June 2014	Siemens LZB 700M	
India	Nagpur Metro	Orange Line	7 March 2019		
India	Nagpur Metro	Aqua Line	28 January 2020		
India	Namma Metro	Purple Line	20 October 2011	Alstom Urbalis 200	
India	Namma Metro	Green Line	1 March 2014	Alstom Urbalis 200	
India	Noida Metro	Aqua Line	25 January 2019	Ansaldo STS CBTC	
India	Pune Metro	Purple Line	6 March 2022		
India	Pune Metro	Aqua Line	6 March 2022		
India	Rapid Metro Gurgaon		14 November 2013		
Indonesia	Jakarta LRT	LRT Line A	1 December 2019		
Indonesia	Jakarta MRT	MRT North-South Line	24 March 2019	Nippon Signal SPARCS	
Japan	Fukuoka City Subway	Airport Line			
Japan	Fukuoka City Subway	Hakozaki Line			
Japan	Fukuoka City Subway	Nanakuma Line	3 February 2005		
Japan	Kobe Municipal Subway	Seishin-Yamate Line			
Japan	Kobe Municipal Subway	Kaigan Line	7 June 2001		
Japan	Kobe Municipal Subway	Hokushin Line	2 April 1988		(Note: A continuation of the Kobe Municipal Subway Seishin-Yamate Line.)
Japan	Kitakyushu Monorail	Kokura Line	9 January 1985		
Japan	Kyoto Municipal Subway	Tōzai Line	12 October 1997		
Japan	Nagoya Municipal Subway	Higashiyama Line	2015		
Japan	Nagoya Municipal Subway	Sakura-dōri Line	16 February 1994		
Japan	Okinawa Urban Monorail		10 August 2003		
Japan	Osaka Metro	Tanimachi Line			(Note: ATO trialled from October 1967 until February 1968; trains now operated in manual mode.)
Japan	Osaka Metro	Sennichimae Line	2015		(Note: ATO previously trialled from October 1973 until July 1974.)
Japan	Osaka Metro	Nagahori Tsurumi-ryokuchi Line	31 March 1990		
Japan	Saitama Railway	Saitama Rapid Railway Line	28 March 2001		(Note: A continuation of the Tokyo Metro Namboku Line.)
Japan	Sapporo Municipal Subway	Namboku Line	2012		
Japan	Sapporo Municipal Subway	Tōzai Line	2008		(Note: Previously used ATO from 1976 until 1990.)
Japan	Sapporo Municipal Subway	Tōhō Line	2016		
Japan	Sendai Subway	Namboku Line	15 July 1987		(Note: World's first railway system to use fuzzy logic to control the speed of trains.)
Japan	Sendai Subway	Tōzai Line	6 December 2015		
Japan	Shinkansen	Joetsu Shinkansen	November 2021		Installed on an E7 Series Shinkansen (Note: In November 2021, JR East demonstrated autonomously operated bullet train E7 in Niigata prefecture; 5 km between Niigata Station and Niigata Shinkansen Stock Yard. They started testing on 29 October.)
Japan	Tama Monorail	Tama Toshi Monorail Line	27 November 1998		
Japan	Tokyo Metro	Marunouchi Line			(Note: Main line converted to ATO in 2010, but Hōnanchō branch continues to use ATC/TASC)
Japan	Tokyo Metro	Namboku Line			
Japan	Tokyo Metro	Fukutoshin Line			
Japan	Tokyo Metro	Yūrakuchō Line			
Japan	Tokyo Metro	Chiyoda Line			(Kita-Ayase branch)
Japan	Tokyo Metro	Hibiya Line			(Note: ATO trialled during the 1960s. Trains now operated in manual mode.)
Japan	Tokyo Metropolitan Bureau of Transportation	Toei Ōedo Line	10 December 1991		
Japan	Tokyo Metropolitan Bureau of Transportation	Toei Mita Line			
Japan	Tsukuba Express		24 August 2005		
Japan	Yokohama Municipal Subway	Blue Line	20 January 2007		
Japan	Yokohama Municipal Subway	Green Line	30 March 2008		
Malaysia	Express Rail Link	KLIA Ekspres	14 April 2002	Bombardier CITYFLO 550	
Malaysia	Express Rail Link	KLIA Transit	14 April 2002	Bombardier CITYFLO 550	
Malaysia	Rapid KL	KL Monorail	31 August 2003		
Philippines	Manila Light Rail Transit System	Line 2	5 April 2003		
Saudi Arabia	Mecca Metro	Al Mashaaer Al Mugaddassah Metro line	13 November 2010	SelTrac	
South Korea	Busan Metro	Line 1	19 July 1985		
South Korea	Busan Metro	Line 2	30 June 1999		
South Korea	Busan Metro	Line 3	28 November 2005		
South Korea	Daegu Metro	Line 1	26 November 1997		
South Korea	Daegu Metro	Line 2	18 October 2005		
South Korea	Daejeon Metro	Line 1	16 March 2006		
South Korea	Gwangju Metro	Line 1	28 April 2004		
South Korea	Incheon Subway	Line 1	6 October 1999		
South Korea	Seoul Metropolitan Subway	Line 2	2010	Siemens LZB 700M	(Note: Older trains still drive in manual mode)
South Korea	Seoul Metropolitan Subway	Line 5	15 November 1995		(Note: Driver on standby and will drive the train when ATO malfunctions or is not available.)
South Korea	Seoul Metropolitan Subway	Line 6	7 August 2000		(Note: Driver on standby and will drive the train when ATO malfunctions or is not available.)
South Korea	Seoul Metropolitan Subway	Line 7	11 October 1996		(Note: Driver on standby and will drive the train when ATO malfunctions or is not available.)
South Korea	Seoul Metropolitan Subway	Line 8	23 November 1999		(Note: Driver on standby and will drive the train when ATO malfunctions or is not available.)
South Korea	Seoul Metropolitan Subway	Line 9	24 July 2009		(Note: Driver on standby and will drive the train when ATO malfunctions or is not available.)
South Korea	Seoul Metropolitan Subway	AREX	23 March 2007		(Note: Driver on standby and will drive the train when ATO malfunctions or is not available.)
South Korea	Seoul Metropolitan Subway	Bundang Line	2006	SelTrac	(Note: Utilizes the SelTrac system with driver on board in case of emergencies.)
South Korea	Seoul Metropolitan Subway	Seohae Line	16 June 2018	Siemens Trainguard MT CBTC	
Taiwan	Kaohsiung Rapid Transit	Red line	9 March 2008		
Taiwan	Kaohsiung Rapid Transit	Orange line	14 September 2008		
Taiwan	Taipei Metro	Tamsui–Xinyi line	28 March 1997		
Taiwan	Taipei Metro	Songshan–Xindian line	24 December 1998		
Taiwan	Taipei Metro	Zhonghe–Xinlu line	24 December 1998		
Taiwan	Taipei Metro	Bannan line	24 December 1999		
Taiwan	Taoyuan Metro	Taoyuan Airport MRT	2 March 2017	Siemens Trainguard MT CBTC	
Thailand	BTS Skytrain	Sukhumvit Line	5 December 1999	Bombardier CITYFLO 450	
Thailand	BTS Skytrain	Silom Line	5 December 1999	Bombardier CITYFLO 450	
Thailand	MRT (Bangkok)	Blue Line	3 July 2004	Siemens LZB 700M	
Thailand	MRT (Bangkok)	Purple Line	6 August 2016	Bombardier CITYFLO 650	
Thailand	State Railway of Thailand	Suvarnabhumi Airport Rail Link	23 August 2010	Siemens LZB 700M	
Turkey	Ankara Metro	Batıkent Metrosu (M1)	29 December 1997	Ansaldo STS CBTC	Previously used Seltrac CBTC (Note: Uses a modified version of Toronto subway's H6 subway model made by Bombardier Transportation and configured for driverless operation.)
Turkey	Ankara Metro	Koru Metrosu (M2)	2014	Ansaldo STS CBTC	
Turkey	Ankara Metro	Törekent Metrosu (M3)	2014	Ansaldo STS CBTC	
Turkey	Ankara Metro	Keçiören Metrosu (M4)	5 January 2017	Ansaldo STS CBTC	
Turkey	Istanbul Metro	Line M4	17 August 2012	Seltrac CBTC	
Turkey	Marmaray		29 October 2013	Invensys Sirius CBTC	
Vietnam	Hanoi Metro	Line 2A	6 November 2021		
Vietnam	Hanoi Metro	Line 3	8 August 2024		
Vietnam	Ho Chi Minh City Metro	Line 1	22 December 2024		

== Europe ==
Country/region	Name of system	Line	Date	System	Notes
Austria	Vienna U-Bahn	Line U1			(Note: Uses the same system as Munich with fully driverless turning at some terminuses.)
Austria	Vienna U-Bahn	Line U2			(Note: Uses the same system as Munich with fully driverless turning at some terminuses.)
Austria	Vienna U-Bahn	Line U3			(Note: Uses the same system as Munich with fully driverless turning at some terminuses.)
Austria	Vienna U-Bahn	Line U4			(Note: Uses the same system as Munich with fully driverless turning at some terminuses.)
Belarus	Minsk Metro	Zelenaluzhskaya line	6 November 2020		
Czech Republic	Prague Metro	Line A		AŽD Praha LZA	
Czech Republic	Prague Metro	Line B		AŽD Praha LZA	(Note: Line B is partly automated.)
Czech Republic	Prague Metro	Line C		Siemens PA 135	To be converted to GoA4
Czech Republic	Czech railways		1991		(Note: Czech railways have used GoA2 operation since 1991. Currently, about 400 vehicles are equipped with on-board units. 1500 km of lines (of total 9000 km network) are equipped with lineside part of ATO, next 1500 km are covered by data for GPS localisation.)
France	Lyon Metro	Line A			
France	Paris Metro	Line 2			
France	Paris Metro	Line 3	2010	OCTYS System	
France	Paris Metro	Line 5	2013	OCTYS System	
France	Paris Metro	Line 6			
France	Paris Metro	Line 7			
France	Paris Metro	Line 8			
France	Paris Metro	Line 9		OCTYS System	
France	Paris Metro	Line 11			
France	Paris Metro	Line 12			
France	Paris Metro	Line 13	2013	SelTrac	Planned conversion to GoA4
France	Paris Metro	Paris RER	RER A	September 1989	SACEM
Germany	Düsseldorf Stadtbahn				(Note: Driver operates the doors and handles emergency situations, accelerating and braking is fully automated, but just between the 22 underground stations. Outside the underground stations the driver operates the train manual.)
Germany	Munich U-Bahn				(Note: Driver operates the doors and handles emergency situations, accelerating and braking is fully automated; a fully driverless turning at terminus stations is planned.)
Germany	ICE			Linienzugbeeinflussung	(Note: German ICE high-speed lines equipped with the Linienzugbeeinflussung (LZB) signalling system support a form of GoA2 ATO operation called AFB (Automatische Fahr- und Bremssteuerung, lit. automatic driving and braking control) which enables the driver to let the on-board train computer drive the train on autopilot, automatically driving at the maximum speed currently allowed by LZB signalling. In this mode, the driver only monitors the train and watches for unexpected obstacles on the tracks. On lines equipped with only PZB/Indusi, AFB acts entirely as a speed cruise control, driving according to the speed set by the driver with manual braking if needed.)
Hungary	Budapest Metro	Line 2	2013	Siemens CBTC	
Hungary	Budapest Metro	Line 3		Matra PA 135	
Hungary	Budapest Metro	Line 4	2014	Siemens CBTC	
Italy	Milan Metro	Line 1	2010	Alstom Urbalis	
Italy	Milan Metro	Line 3		Siemens LZB 700M	
Italy	Naples Metro	Line 1		Ansaldo STS ATIS	
Netherlands	Amsterdam Metro	Route 50		Alstom Urbalis 400	
Netherlands	Amsterdam Metro	Route 51		Alstom Urbalis 400	
Netherlands	Amsterdam Metro	Route 52	30 July 2018	Alstom Urbalis 400	
Netherlands	Amsterdam Metro	Route 53		Alstom Urbalis 400	
Netherlands	Amsterdam Metro	Route 54		Alstom Urbalis 400	
Romania	Bucharest Metro	Line M1		Bombardier CITYFLO 350	
Romania	Bucharest Metro	Line M2		Bombardier CITYFLO 350	
Romania	Bucharest Metro	Line M3		Bombardier CITYFLO 350	
Romania	Bucharest Metro	Line M4		Siemens TBS100FB	
Romania	Bucharest Metro	Line M5	15 September 2020	Alstom Urbalis 400	
Russia	Kazan Metro	Central Line	27 August 2005	Dvizhenie	
Russia	Saint Petersburg Metro	Line 2		Dvizhenie	
Russia	Saint Petersburg Metro	Line 4		PUAV	
Russia	Saint Petersburg Metro	Line 5		PA-M	
Spain	Barcelona Metro	Line 1		Bombardier CITYFLO 350	
Spain	Barcelona Metro	Line 2			
Spain	Barcelona Metro	Line 3		Bombardier CITYFLO 350	
Spain	Barcelona Metro	Line 5			
Spain	Barcelona Metro	Line 6			
Spain	Barcelona Metro	Line 7			
Spain	Barcelona Metro	Line 8			
Spain	Bilbao Metro	Line 1	11 November 1995	Bombardier CITYFLO 350	
Spain	Bilbao Metro	Line 2	13 April 2002	Bombardier CITYFLO 350	
Spain	Bilbao Metro	Line 3	8 April 2017	Bombardier CITYFLO 350	
Spain	Madrid Metro	Line 1	July 2009	Bombardier CITYFLO 650	
Spain	Madrid Metro	Line 2	2011		
Spain	Madrid Metro	Line 3			
Spain	Madrid Metro	Line 4			
Spain	Madrid Metro	Line 5			
Spain	Madrid Metro	Line 6	July 2008	Bombardier CITYFLO 650	
Spain	Madrid Metro	Line 7	2011	Invensys CBTC	
Spain	Madrid Metro	Line 8			
Spain	Madrid Metro	Line 9			
Spain	Madrid Metro	Line 10			
Spain	Madrid Metro	Line 11			
Spain	Madrid Metro	Line 12			
Spain	Madrid Metro	Ramal			
Spain	Málaga Metro	Line 1	30 July 2014	Alstom Urbalis 400	
Spain	Málaga Metro	Line 2	30 July 2014	Alstom Urbalis 400	
Spain	Metrovalencia	Line 1			(Note: Between Empalme and Torrent stations)
Spain	Metrovalencia	Line 2			(Note: Between Les Carolines-Fira and Torrent stations)
Spain	Seville Metro	Line 1	2 April 2009	Bombardier CITYFLO 350	
Sweden	Stockholm Metro	Line 17			
Sweden	Stockholm Metro	Line 18			
Sweden	Stockholm Metro	Line 19			
Turkey	Istanbul Metro	Line M2	16 September 2000	Siemens Trainguard MT CBTC	
Turkey	Istanbul Metro	Line M3	14 June 2013	Bombardier CITYFLO 350	
Turkey	Istanbul Metro	Line M6	19 April 2015	Siemens Trainguard MT CBTC	
Turkey	Istanbul Metro	Line M9	29 May 2021	Bombardier CITYFLO 350	
Turkey	Marmaray		29 October 2013	Invensys Sirius CBTC	
United Kingdom	Glasgow Subway		16 April 1980		
United Kingdom	London Underground	Victoria line	1967		
United Kingdom	London Underground	Central line	1990s (mid-decade)		(Note: A member of staff opens & closes the train doors monitors the train and fixes faults on board. Drivers drive the trains on Sundays and Bank holidays. All shunt moves are made by the drivers and whenever the train stops for fail safe reasons such as excess wheel spin or sliding the driver takes over; at other times trains are computer driven.)
United Kingdom	London Underground	Circle line	2022		
United Kingdom	London Underground	Jubilee line	2011		(Note: A member of staff opens & closes the train doors, drives the train on Sundays, fixes faults.)
United Kingdom	London Underground	Northern line	2012	SelTrac	(Note: A driver operates the doors and presses buttons to start the train, the train is driven manually on Sundays, and can be driven in manual outside of peak hours.)
United Kingdom	Thameslink		2018		(Note: Between St Pancras and Blackfriars stations)
United Kingdom	Elizabeth line	Crossrail	24 May 2022	Siemens Trainguard MT CBTC	(Note: Between Paddington and Whitechapel stations)

== Oceania ==
Country/region	Name of system	Line	Date	System	Notes
Australia	Rio Tinto AutoHaul	Hamersley & Robe River railway line	10 July 2018	ETCS Level 2 with GoA4	
Australia	Metro Trains Melbourne	Sunbury–Dandenong Line	30 July 2023	Bombardier CITYFLO 650	
Australia	Queensland Rail Citytrain	Cross River Rail	2026	ETCS Level 2	

== Future systems ==
=== Americas ===
Country/region	Name of system	Line	Date	System	Notes
Argentina	Buenos Aires Underground	Line A			
Argentina	Buenos Aires Underground	Line B			
Argentina	Buenos Aires Underground	Line F			
Canada	Toronto subway	Line 2 Bloor-Danforth	2030	Alstom Urbalis 400	(Note: Expected to have ATC/ATO implemented on the Yonge–University–Spadina Line by 2019 and the Bloor–Danforth Line, funding permitting, by 2030.)
United States	New York City Subway	IND Culver Line (F, <F>, and G trains)		SelTrac	
United States	New York City Subway	IND Queens Boulevard Line (E, F, <F>, M, and R trains)		Siemens Trainguard MT CBTC	
United States	New York City Subway	IND Eighth Avenue Line (A, C, and E trains)		Siemens Trainguard MT CBTC	

=== Asia ===
Country/region	Name of system	Line	Date	System	Notes
China	Guiyang Metro	Line T2	2027		
China	Qingdao Metro	Line 7	2027		
China	Shenyang Metro	Line 6	2027		
China	Ürümqi Metro	Line 2	December 2026		
India	Kolkata Metro	Pink Line			
India	Lucknow Metro	Blue Line			
Turkey	Istanbul Metro	Line M10	2027	Seltrac CBTC	

=== Europe ===
Country/region	Name of system	Line	Date	System	Notes
United Kingdom	London Underground	All Subsurface Lines: District, Hammersmith & City and Metropolitan.		SelTrac	(Note: Phased migration as part of 4 Lines Modernisation (4LM).)
United Kingdom	London Underground	Deep level tube: Bakerloo, Piccadilly and Waterloo & City.		SelTrac	
Finland	Helsinki Metro	Line M1	2029	CAF OPTIO CBTC	
Finland	Helsinki Metro	Line M2	2029	CAF OPTIO CBTC	
Spain	Metro de Madrid	All Subsurface Lines (A.T.O.)			

== See also ==
- Automatic train operation
- Automated guided vehicle
- Janes World Railways
- Communications-based train control
