= Hong Prefecture =

Historical administrative division in Jiangxi, China

Hongzhou or Hong Prefecture (洪州) was a zhou (prefecture) in modern Jiangxi, China, seated in modern Nanchang. It existed (intermittently) from 589 to 1165.

== Geography ==
The administrative region of Hongzhou in the Tang dynasty falls within modern Jiangxi. It probably includes parts of modern:

- Under the administration of Nanchang:
  - Nanchang: Donghu District, Xihu District, Qingyunpu District, Wanli District and Qingshanhu District
  - Nanchang County
  - Anyi County
  - Xinjian County
  - Jinxian County
- Under the administration of Jiujiang:
  - Yongxiu County
  - Wuning County
  - Xiushui County
- Under the administration of Yichun:
  - Tonggu County
  - Wanzai County
  - Shanggao County
  - Yifeng County
  - Fengxin County
  - Jing'an County
  - Gao'an
  - Fengcheng
