= Line 1 (Nanchang Metro) =

Metro line in Nanchang, China

- 1
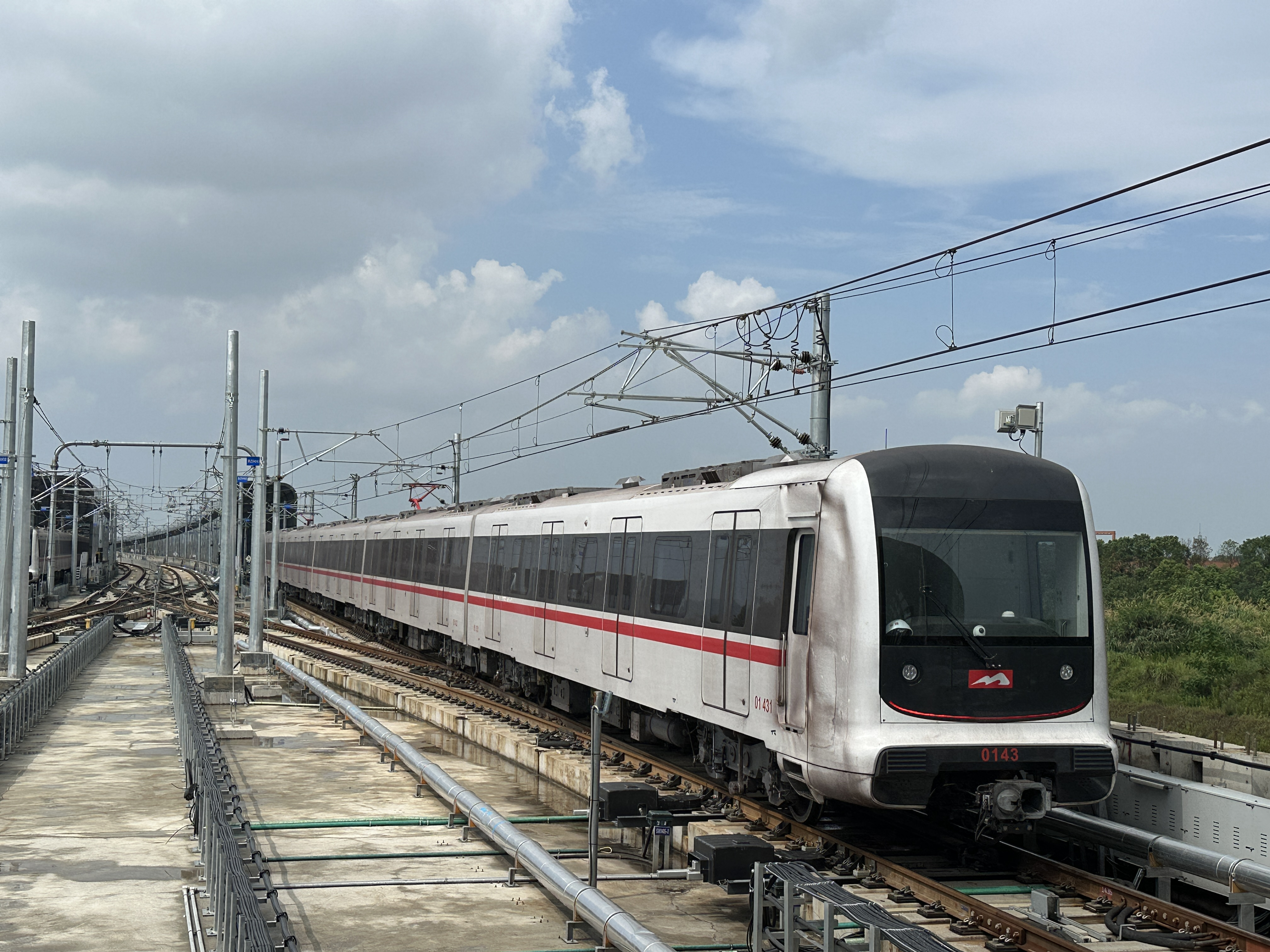
- Line 1 train leaving Huixian Avenue station

Overview
- Other name: Nanchang Rail Transit Line 1
- Native name: 南昌地铁1号线
- Status: Operational
- Locale: Nanchang, Jiangxi, China
- Termini: Changbei Airport; Maqiu
- Stations: 34

Service
- Type: Rail Transit
- System: Nanchang Metro
- Depot(s): Jiaoqiao Train Shed; Yaohu MPD
- Rolling stock: 6-car Type B

History
- Opened: 26 December 2015; 10 years ago

Technical
- Line length: 48.55 km (30.17 mi)
- Track gauge: 1,435 mm (4 ft 8 1/2 in)
- Electrification: Overhead catenary, DC 1500 V
- Operating speed: 80 km/h (50 mph)

Nanchang Metro Line 1 (also known as Nanchang Rail Transit Line 1 in official documents) is the first rail transit line ever constructed in Nanchang and has opened in 2015. The Phase 1 of Line 1 runs from Shuanggang to Olympic Stadium, covered North Nanchang (Changbei, Chinese: 昌北), Old Town and East Nanchang (Changdong, Chinese: 昌东). It is planned in Phase 2 that Line 1 will be extended to Changbei Airport to the northwest and Maqiu (Chinese: 麻丘) to the east.

== Introduction ==
Nanchang Metro Line 1 shapes like the letter 'L', its Phase 1 is 28.737 km in length and includes 24 stations. The average distance between stations is 1,251 m. The construction has begun in 29 July 2009 and was finished by 2015.

In the initial plan of 2008, Line 1 spanned from Yao Lake (Chinese: 瑶湖) in the east to Lehua (Chinese: 乐化) in the northwest, and is 35 km in length in the long-term plan, which was confirmed in June 2013 again.

- East extension: Phase 2 extends Line 1 from Olympic Stadium on the west bank of Yao Lake to Maqiu on the east bank. This extension is planned to be 4 km in length, underground, and have 2 stations.
- North extension: Phase 2 extends Line 1 to Changbei Airport via Lehua.

== Opening timeline ==
Segment	Commencement	Length	Station(s)	Name
Shuanggang — Yaohu Lake West	26 December 2015	28.737 km (17.86 mi)	24	Phase 1
Changbei Airport — Shuanggang	28 June 2025	16.62 km (10.33 mi)	8	North extension
Yaohu Lake West — Maqiu	28 June 2025	4.34 km (2.70 mi)	2	East extension

== Stations ==
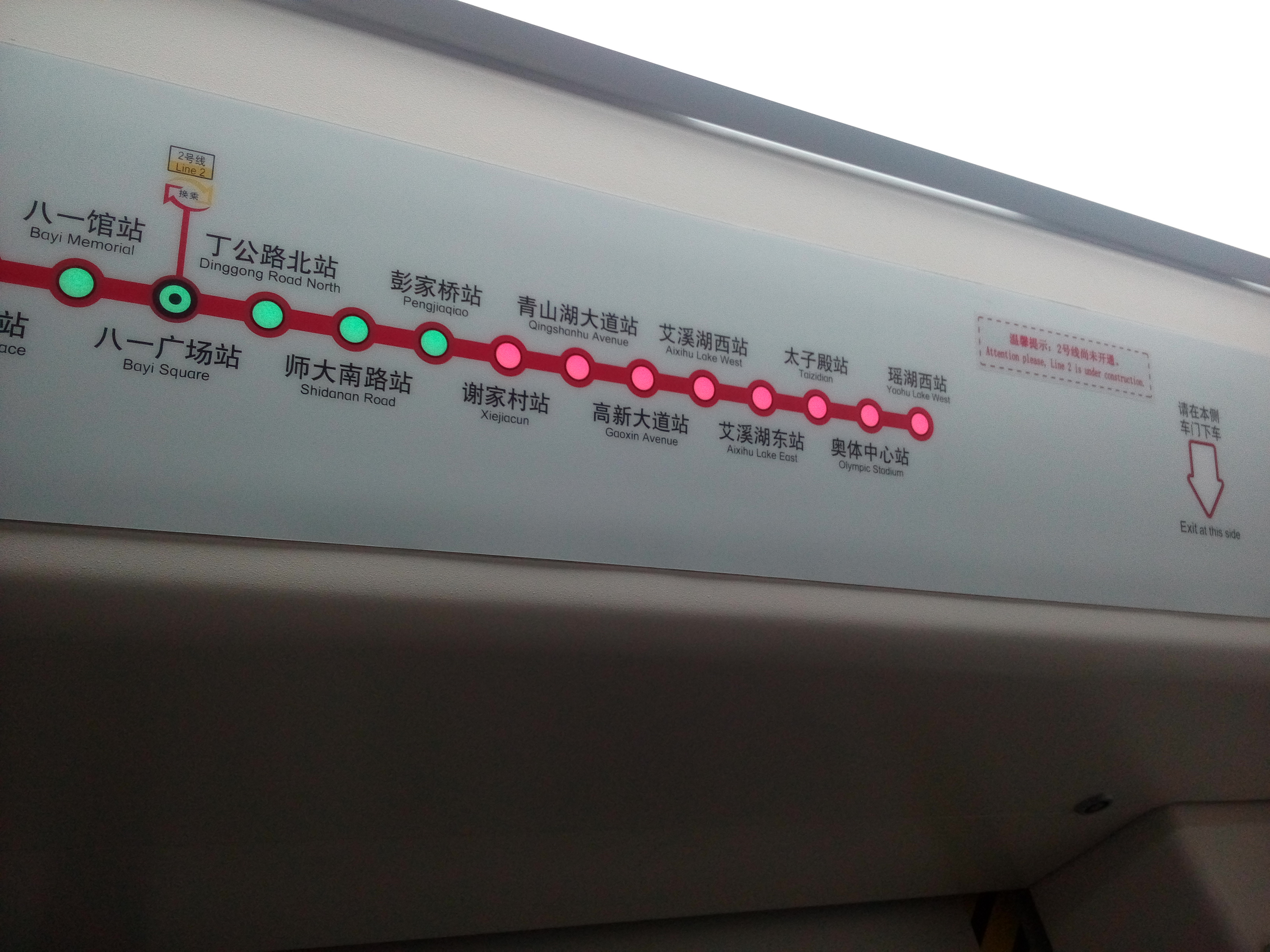
LED progress indicator on Line 1, taken between Pengjiaqiao and Xiejiacun.

Service Routes		Station name		Connections	Distance km		Location (urban district)
Service Routes		English	Chinese	Connections	Distance km		Location (urban district)
●		Changbei Airport	昌北机场	KHN	0.00	0.00	Xinjian
●		Huixian Avenue	汇贤大道		6.61	6.61	Xinjian
●		Jianye Avenue	建业大道		1.56	8.17	Xinjian
●		Dingzishan	定子山		2.85	11.02	Xinjian
●		Guanshan	冠山		1.15	12.17	Xinjian
●		Nanchi	南齿		1.61	13.78	Xinjian
●		Fang Zhimin Avenue	方志敏大道		0.90	14.68	Xinjian
●		Jiaoqiao	蛟桥		0.84	15.52	Xinjian
●	●	Shuanggang	双港		1.02	16.54	Xinjian
●	●	Kongmuhu Lake	孔目湖		1.22	17.76	Xinjian
●	●	Changjiang Road	长江路		3.08	20.84	Honggutan
●	●	Zhujiang Road	珠江路		1.21	22.05	Honggutan
●	●	South Lushan Avenue	庐山南大道		1.31	23.36	Honggutan
●	●	Lüyin Road	绿茵路		0.89	24.25	Honggutan
●	●	Weidong	卫东		1.18	25.43	Honggutan
●	●	Metro Central	地铁大厦	2	0.99	26.42	Honggutan
●	●	Qiushui Square	秋水广场		0.79	27.21	Honggutan
●	●	Tengwang Pavilion	滕王阁		2.03	29.24	Donghu / Xihu
●	●	Wanshou Palace	万寿宫		0.81	30.05	Donghu / Xihu
●	●	Bayi Memorial	八一馆	3	0.59	30.64	Donghu / Xihu
●	●	Bayi Square	八一广场	2	1.10	31.74	Donghu / Xihu
●	●	Dinggong Road North	丁公路北	4	1.05	32.79	Donghu / Xihu
●	●	Shidanan Road	师大南路		1.05	33.84	Donghu / Qingshanhu
●	●	Pengjiaqiao	彭家桥		0.86	34.70	Qingshanhu
●	●	Xiejiacun	谢家村		0.78	35.48	Qingshanhu
●	●	Qingshanhu Avenue	青山湖大道		0.80	36.28	Qingshanhu
●	●	Gaoxin Avenue	高新大道	5	1.12	37.34	Qingshanhu
●	●	Aixihu Lake West	艾溪湖西		1.34	38.74	Qingshanhu
●	●	Aixihu Lake East	艾溪湖东		1.89	40.63	Qingshanhu
●	●	Taizidian	太子殿		1.72	42.35	Nanchang Co.
●	●	Olympic Stadium	奥体中心		1.33	43.68	Nanchang Co.
●	●	Yaohu Lake West	瑶湖西		1.37	45.05	Nanchang Co.
●	●	Yaohu Lake East	瑶湖东		2.06	47.11	Nanchang Co.
●	●	Maqiu	麻丘		1.44	48.55	Nanchang Co.

== Rolling stock ==
The line is operated with Type B rolling stock at a maximum speed of 80 km/h. 27 trains of 6-car set, 162 cars in total will be operated at the first stage. These cars are 2.8 m in width, 3.8 m in height and 19 m in length, providing the system with a maximum capacity of 30,000 to 55,000 passengers per hour per direction, and minimum service interval of 2 minutes.
