= Line 3 (Nanchang Metro) =

Line of Nanchang Metro

- 3
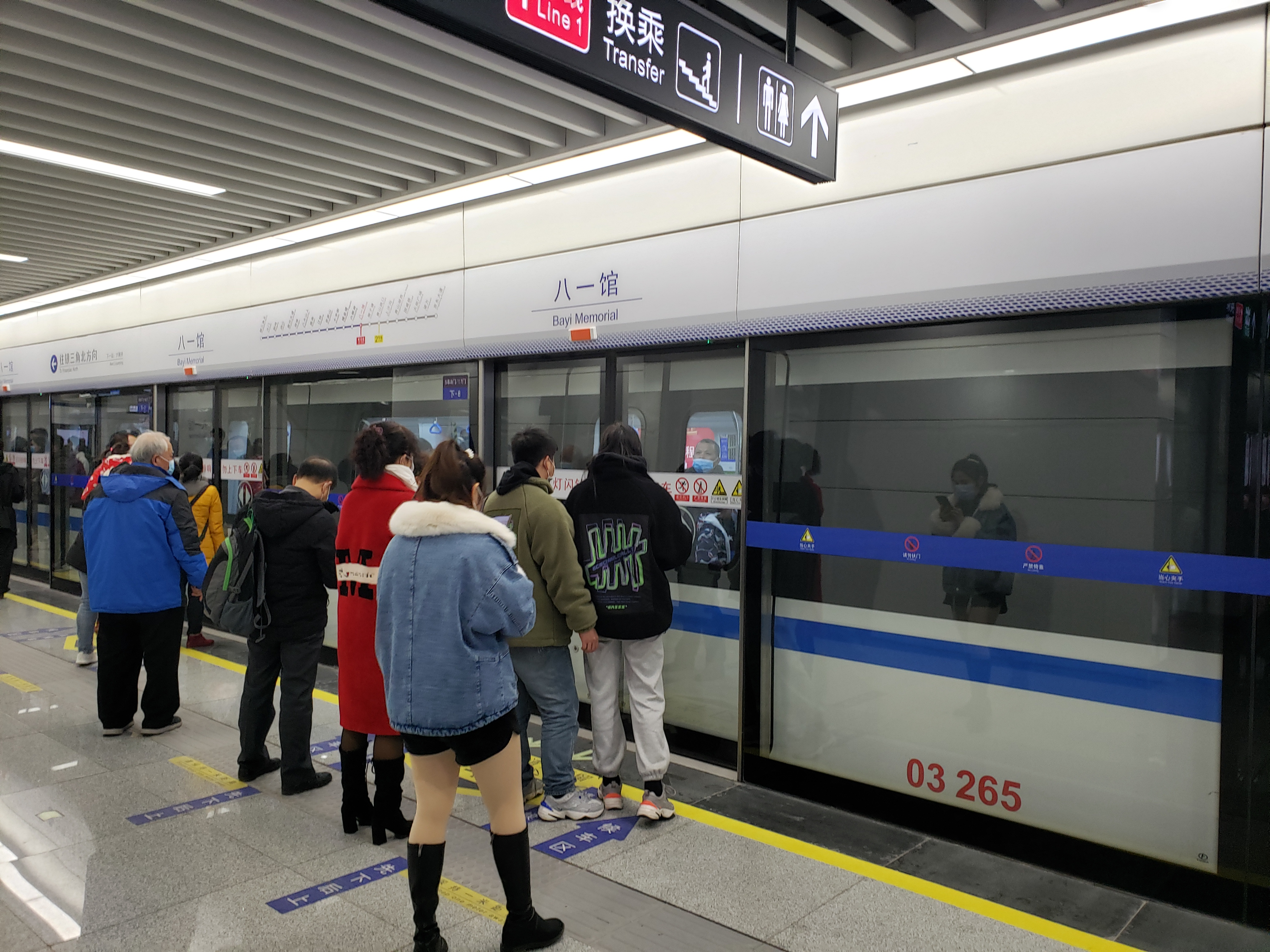
- Bayi Memorial station

Overview
- Native name: 南昌地铁3号线
- Status: Operational
- Locale: Nanchang, Jiangxi, China
- Termini: Yinsanjiao North; Jingdong Avenue
- Stations: 22

Service
- Type: Rail Transit
- System: Nanchang Metro
- Operator(s): China Railway (Nanchang) Suicheng Rail Transit Construction and Operation Co., Ltd.
- Rolling stock: 6-car Type B

History
- Opened: 26 December 2020; 5 years ago

Technical
- Line length: 28.666 km (17.812 mi)
- Track gauge: 1,435 mm (4 ft 8 1/2 in)

Nanchang Metro Line 3 is the third line to open in the Nanchang Metro rapid transit system. Construction officially began on 30 December 2015 and opened on 26 December 2020.

== Opening timeline ==
Segment	Commencement	Length	Station(s)	Name
Yinsanjiao North — Jingdong Avenue	26 December 2020	28.5 km (17.71 mi)	22	Phase 1

== Stations ==
Station name		Connections	Distance km	Location
English	Chinese	Connections	Distance km	Location
Yinsanjiao North	银三角北			Nanchang Co.
Doumen	斗门			Nanchang Co.
Baigang	柏岗			Nanchang Co.
Lishan	沥山			Nanchang Co.
Fuxing Avenue East	复兴大道东			Nanchang Co.
Dengbu	邓埠			Nanchang Co. / Qingyunpu
Badashanren Memorial	八大山人			Qingyunpu
Shiyao	施尧			Qingyunpu
Jiangling Motors	江铃	5		Qingyunpu
Jingjiashan	京家山			Qingyunpu
Shizi Street	十字街			Qingyunpu
Shengjin Pagoda	绳金塔	4		Xihu
Liuyanjing	六眼井			Xihu
Bayi Memorial	八一馆	1		Xihu / Donghu
Dunzitang	墩子塘			Donghu
Qingshan Road	青山路口	2		Donghu
Shangshagou	上沙沟	4		Donghu
Qingshanhu Lake West	青山湖西			Donghu
Guowei Road	国威路			Qingshanhu
Huoju Square	火炬广场			Qingshanhu
Liangwan	梁万			Qingshanhu
Jingdong Avenue	京东大道			Qingshanhu
