= Line 4 (Nanchang Metro) =

Line of Nanchang Metro

- 4
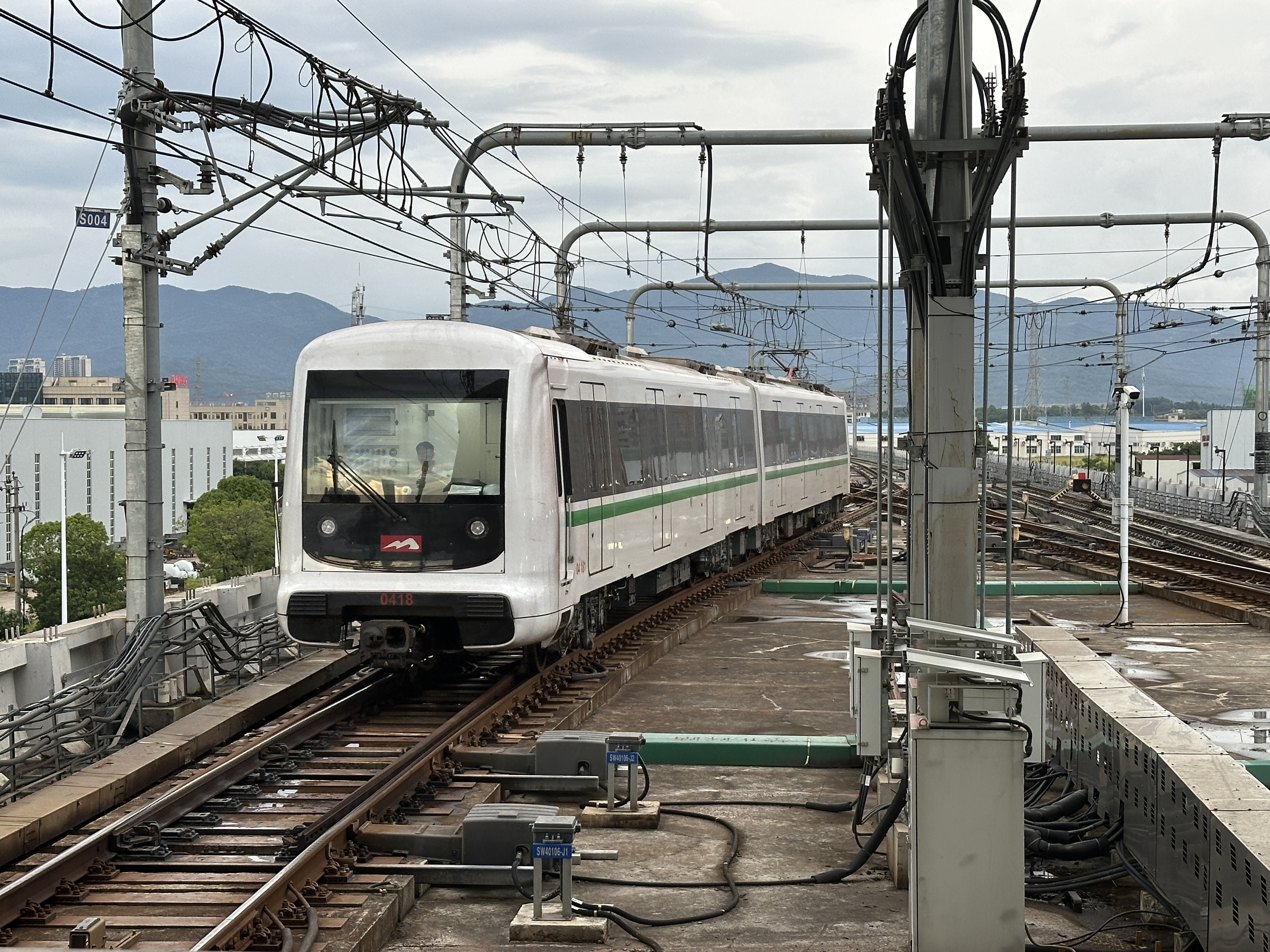
- Line 4 train approaching Baimashan station

Overview
- Native name: 南昌地铁4号线
- Status: Operational
- Locale: Nanchang, Jiangxi, China
- Termini: Baimashan; Yuweizhou
- Stations: 29

Service
- Type: Rail Transit
- System: Nanchang Metro
- Rolling stock: 6-car Type B

History
- Opened: 26 December 2021; 4 years ago

Technical
- Line length: 39.737 km (24.691 mi)
- Track gauge: 1,435 mm (4 ft 8 1/2 in)

Nanchang Metro Line 4 is the fourth metro line to open in Nanchang, Jiangxi, China, which began construction at the end of December 2017 and opened on 26 December 2021..

== Opening timeline ==
Segment	Commencement	Length	Station(s)	Name
Baimashan — Yuweizhou	26 December 2021	39.6 km (24.61 mi)	29	Phase 1

== Stations ==
Station name		Connections	Distance km	Location
English	Chinese	Connections	Distance km	Location
Baimashan	白马山			Xinjian
Yufeng Street	裕丰街			Honggutan
Huangxi	璜溪			Honggutan
Zhongbao	中堡			Honggutan
Lizhuangshan	礼庄山			Honggutan
South Square of West Railway Station	西站南广场	2		Honggutan
Huaiyushan Avenue	怀玉山大道			Honggutan
Anfeng	安丰			Honggutan
Dongxin	东新			Nanchang Co.
New Hongcheng Market	新洪城大市场			Nanchang Co.
Dingjiazhou	丁家洲			Xihu
Guanzhou	观洲			Xihu
Yuntian Road	云天路			Xihu
Guanying Road	灌婴路			Xihu
Nanchang Bridge East	南昌大桥东			Xihu
Taoyuan	桃苑			Xihu
Shengjin Pagoda	绳金塔	3		Xihu
Tanzikou	坛子口			Xihu
Dinggong Road South	丁公路南	2		Xihu
Dinggong Road North	丁公路北	1		Xihu
People's Park	人民公园			Donghu
Shangshagou	上沙沟	3		Donghu
Qifeng Road	起凤路			Donghu
Qili	七里			Donghu
Minyuan Road West	民园路西			Qingshanhu
Huoju	火炬			Qingshanhu
Beili	北沥			Qingshanhu
High-tech Park	科技城			Qingshanhu
Yuweizhou	鱼尾洲			Qingshanhu
