= Line 2 (Nanchang Metro) =

Metro line in Nanchang, China

- 2
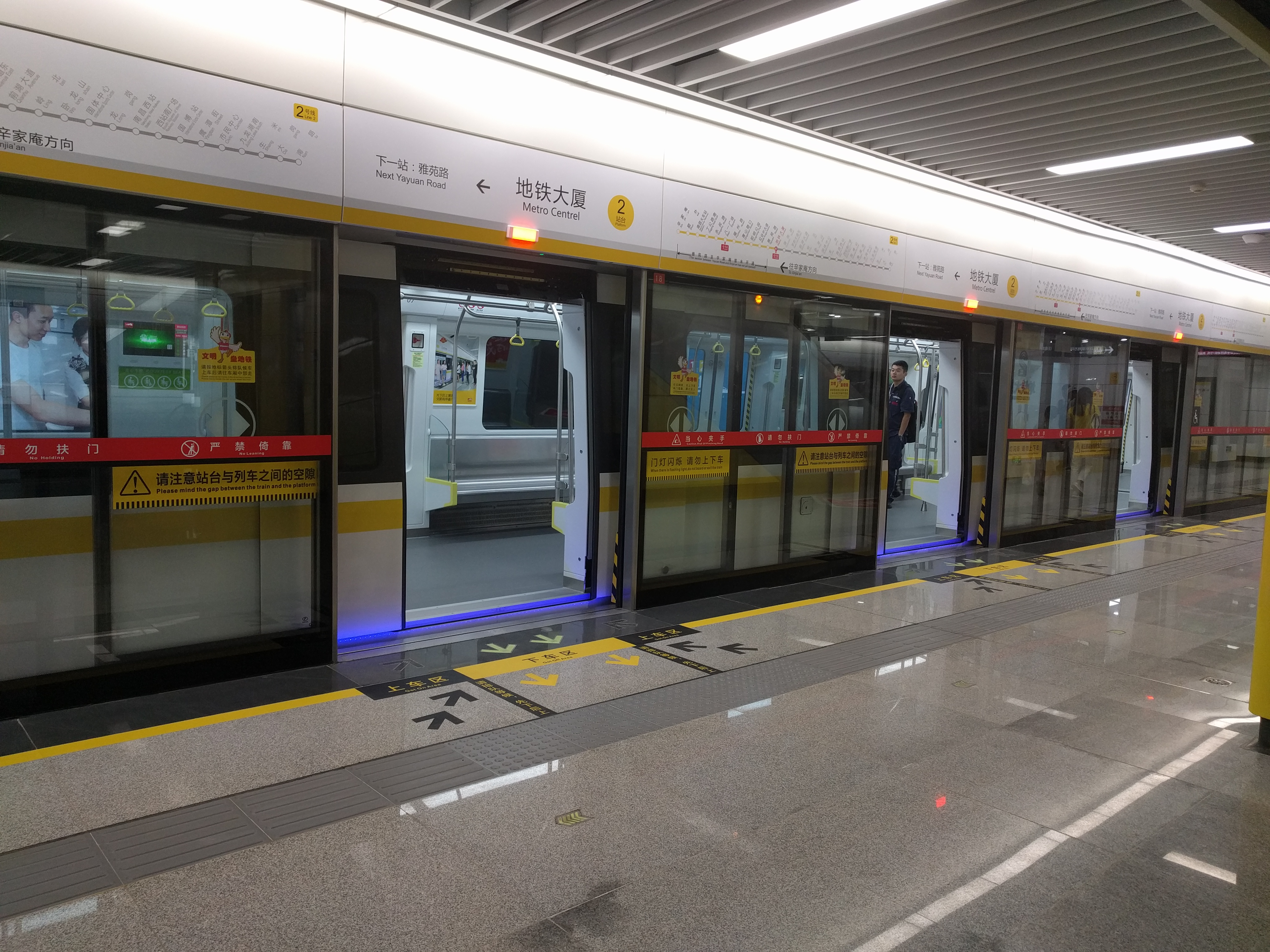
- Metro Central station

Overview
- Other name: Nanchang Rail Transit Line 2
- Native name: 南昌地铁2号线
- Status: Operational
- Locale: Nanchang, Jiangxi, China
- Termini: Nanlu; Nanchang East Railway Station
- Stations: 37

Service
- Type: Rapid transit
- System: Nanchang Metro
- Depot: Shengmi South Depot
- Rolling stock: 6-car Type B

History
- Opened: 18 August 2017; 9 years ago

Technical
- Line length: 45.1 km (28.0 mi)
- Track gauge: 1,435 mm (4 ft 8 1/2 in)
- Electrification: Overhead catenary, 1500 V DC
- Operating speed: 80 km/h (50 mph)

Nanchang Metro Line 2 (also known as Nanchang Rail Transit Line 2 in official documents) is a rapid transit line in Nanchang, from Nanlu to Nanchang East Railway Station. The line is 45.1 km in length with 37 stations.

Construction officially began on 25 October 2013.

The section from Nanlu to Metro Central (19.63 km) opened on 18 August 2017. The section from Metro Central to Xinjia'an (11.88 km) opened on 30 June 2019.

== Opening timeline ==
Segment	Commencement	Length	Station(s)	Name
Nanlu — Metro Central	18 August 2017	19.63 km (12.20 mi)	17	Phase 1 (Section 1) & Phase 2 (Southern extension)
Metro Central — Xinjia'an	30 June 2019	11.88 km (7.38 mi)	11	Phase 1 (Section 2)
Xinjia'an — Nanchang East Railway Station	25 June 2025	10.52 km (6.54 mi)	9	Phase 2 (Eastern extension)

== Stations ==
station name		Connections	Distance km		Location
English	Chinese	Connections	Distance km		Location
Nanlu	南路		---	0.000	Xinjian
Nanchang High School (Note: Was Dagang (大岗) until 15 December 2024.)	南昌中学		0.890	0.890	Xinjian
Shengmi	生米				Xinjian
Jiulong Lake South	九龙湖南				Xinjian
Civic Center	市民中心				Xinjian
Yingtan Street	鹰潭街				Xinjian
International Expo Center	国博				Xinjian
South Square of West Railway Station	西站南广场	NXG 4			Xinjian
Nanchang West Railway Station	南昌西站	NXG			Xinjian
Longgang	龙岗				Xinjian
International Sports Center	国体中心				Xinjian
Wolongshan	卧龙山				Xinjian
Lingbei	岭北				Xinjian
Qianhu Avenue	前湖大道				Xinjian
Xuefu Avenue East	学府大道东				Xinjian
Cuiyuan Road	翠苑路				Xinjian
Metro Central	地铁大厦	1			Donghu / Qingshanhu / Xinjian
Yayuan Road	雅苑路				Donghu / Qingshanhu
Middle Honggu Avenue	红谷中大道				Donghu
Yangming Park	阳明公园				Donghu
Qingshan Road	青山路口	3			Donghu
Fuzhou Road	福州路				Donghu
Bayi Square	八一广场	1			Donghu
Yongshu Road	永叔路				Xihu
Dinggong Road South	丁公路南	4			Xihu
Nanchang Railway Station	南昌火车站	NCG			Xihu / Qingshanhu
Shunwai	顺外				Qingshanhu
Xinjia'an	辛家庵				Qingshanhu
Lengshang	楞上				Qingyunpu
Beiluo	北罗				Qingyunpu
Lixiang	李巷				Qingyunpu
Shenqiao	沈桥				Qingyunpu
Guantian	观田				Qingyunpu
Luojiaji	罗家集				Qingyunpu
Fengxia	枫下				Qingyunpu
International Exhibition Center	国展中心				Qingyunpu
Nanchang East Railway Station	南昌东站	NUG			Qingyunpu

== Rolling stock ==
The line is operated with Type B rolling stock with a maximum speed of 80 km/h. 22 trains of 6-car set, 132 cars in total will be operated at the first stage. These cars are 2.8 m in width, 3.8 m in height and 19 m in length, providing the system with a maximum capacity of 30,000 to 55,000 passengers per hour in each direction, and a minimum service interval of 2 minutes.

== History ==
The construction of Phase 1 started in July 2013.

In the initial plan of 2008, Line 2 spans from Luojia Town in the east to Wangcheng (Chinese: 望城) in the west, and is 39 km in length in the long-term plan. Its Phase 1 starts from Nanchang West railway station to Hongdu Zhong Dadao, which was extended to Xinjia'an to the east in the end of 2010 and then extended further south to Jiulonghu in early 2013.
