= Nanchang Metro =

Metro system in Nanchang, China

Nanchang Rail Transit
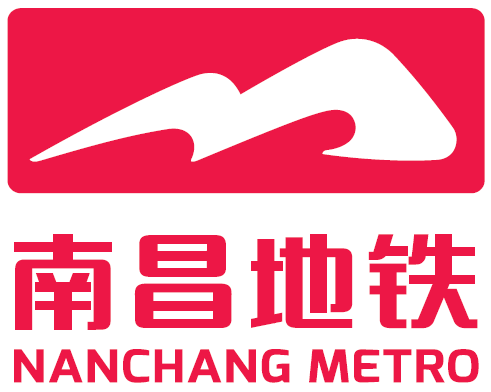

Overview
- Locale: Nanchang, Jiangxi, China
- Transit type: Rapid transit
- Number of lines: 4
- Number of stations: 122
- Daily ridership: 1,182,700 (2025 average); 2.6996 million (2025 Peak)

Operation
- Began operation: December 26, 2015; 10 years ago (Line 1)
- Operators: Nanchang Rail Transit Group Co., Ltd. (All, except Line 3); China Railway (Nanchang) Suicheng Rail Transit Construction and Operation Co., Ltd. (Line 3 only)

Nanchang Rail Transit
- Simplified Chinese: 南昌轨道交通
- Traditional Chinese: 南昌軌道交通
Transcriptions
Standard Mandarin
- Hanyu Pinyin: Nánchāng Gǔidào Jiāotōng
Gan
- Romanization: Lan4cong1 Gu3itao5 Gao1tung1

Nanchang Metro
- Simplified Chinese: 南昌地铁
- Traditional Chinese: 南昌地鐵
Transcriptions
Standard Mandarin
- Hanyu Pinyin: Nánchāng dìtiě
Gan
- Romanization: Lan4cong1 Ti5tiet6

Nanchang Metro, officially Nanchang Rail Transit, is a rapid transit system in Nanchang, Jiangxi, China. The Metro opened for commercial operation in December 2015. As of 2025, four lines are operational. After the latest expansions in June 2025, the network is currently 163.0 km (101.3 mi) in length. A Line 5 is currently still under planning.

== Network ==
=== Network map ===

Line	Terminals (District)		Commencement	Newest Extension	Length km	Stations
1	Changbei Airport (Xinjian)	Maqiu (Nanchang Co.)	December 26, 2015	June 28, 2025	49.8	34
2	Nanlu (Xinjian)	Nanchang East Railway Station (Qingshanhu)	August 18, 2017	June 25, 2025	45.1	37
3	Jingdong Avenue (Qingshanhu)	Yinsanjiao North (Nanchang Co.)	December 26, 2020	—	28.5	22
4	Yuweizhou (Qingshanhu)	Baimashan (Honggutan)	December 26, 2021	—	39.6	29
Total					163.0	122

== History ==
=== Origins ===
The construction of a rail transit system in Nanchang was first proposed in the beginning of the 2000s. The population of the urban core of Nanchang is projected to reach 3.5 million people by 2020. In August 2005, Jiangxi Provincial Development & Reform Commission and Nanchang City Government replied to the proposal of building a metro system, and the City Government considered listing the proposal in the Eleventh Five-year plan. In November, a plan of 4 metro and 1 light rail was drafted. In 2006, the City officially started the research of building a rail transit system. In the second half of 2007, the prophase research of the construction of the system was initiated. On 30 July 2008, the construction of Nanchang Metro was formally included in the priority agenda.

=== Planning ===
==== Initial Plan ====
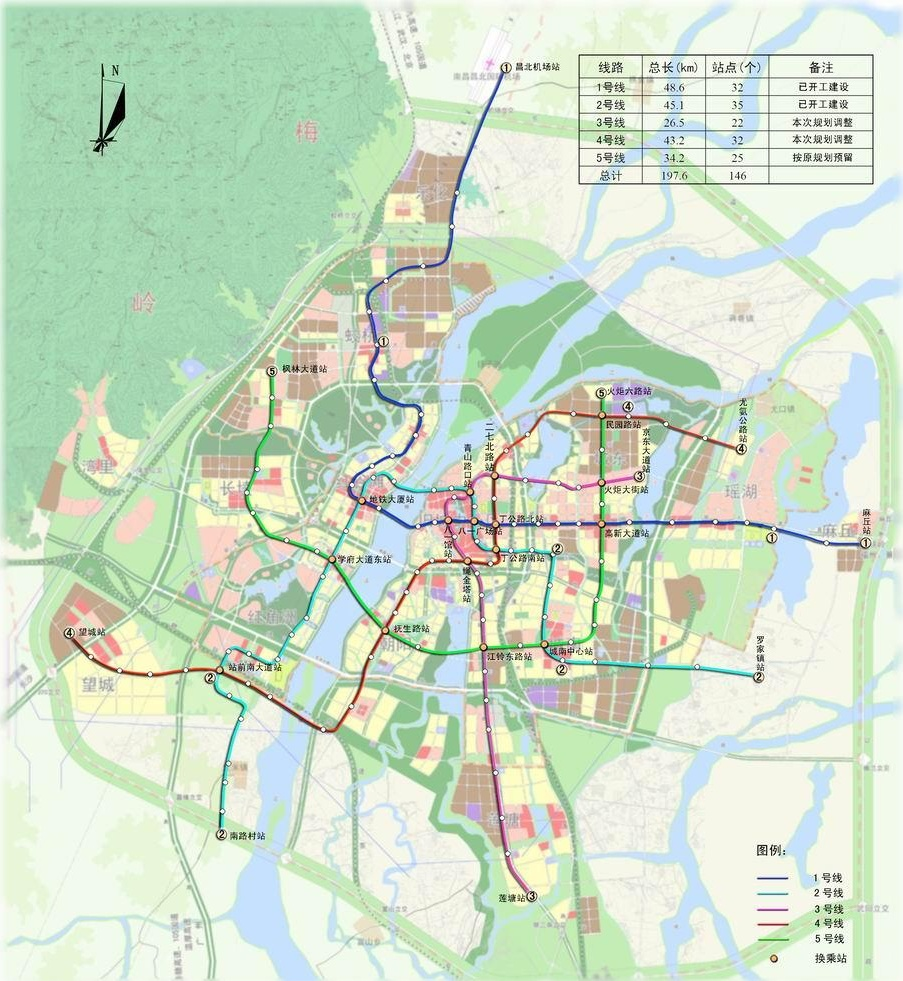
Planned network of Nanchang Metro in 2014

In 2008, Nanchang was approved to build a rail transit system by the State Council, and Nanchang Rail Transit Group Co., Ltd. was incorporated on 16 October 2008 to construct and operate Nanchang Metro. On 15 September, the planned 5 routes were notified to the public, which was approved by the State Council in July 2009. On 29 July 2009, the construction of Nanchang City Rapid Rail Transit officially began, and also on the same day the detailed route and construction plan of the five lines was proclaimed at the press conference. In July 2010, the National Development and Reform Commission approved the feasibility study report of the first phase of Nanchang Metro Line 1.

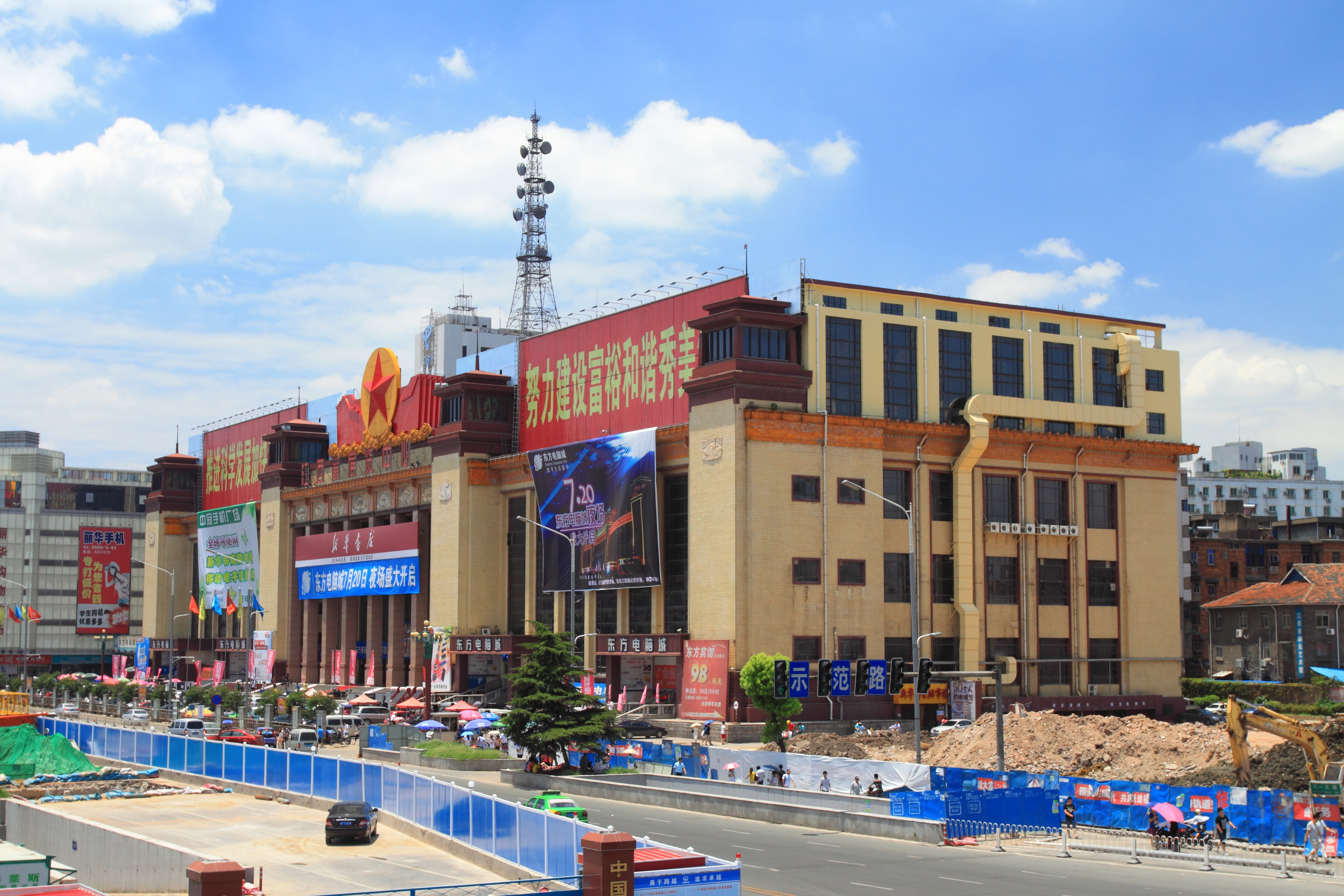
The Xinhua Bookstore by Bayi Square was demolished to make space for Nanchang Metro Line 1

Construction of Line 1 has started on 29 July 2009, and the line opened on December 26, 2015.

In April 2013, the Government planned to acquire approval for all 5 lines by 2014, start constructing all planned lines from 2015, and plan Line 6 to Line 10 to complement the existing network.

As of August 2013, the construction of Line 2 also started with the first section opening on August 18, 2017. The construction was planned for Line 3 to start in September 2014, and Line 4 will be constructed as soon as September 2015.

==== Phase 2 ====
On 31 May 2013, Nanchang Government submitted three candidate plans for the Phase 2 construction (2014-2020) to the expert panel, which chose the compromising Plan 2. According to the plan, Line 2 will be extended to both directions from 2014, Line 1 from 2016.

Line 1 north and Line 2 east extension both started construction in September 2021. The project extended Line 1 north from Shuanggang Station to Changbei Airport. The extension is 16.62 km (10.33 mi) in length, including 11.86 km (7.37 mi) underground and 3.23 km (2.01 mi) elevated. Line 2 was extended from Xinjia'an Station to Nanchang East railway station, the extension is 10.52 km (6.54 mi) in length and fully underground. Both extensions were opened in June 2025.

=== Future ===
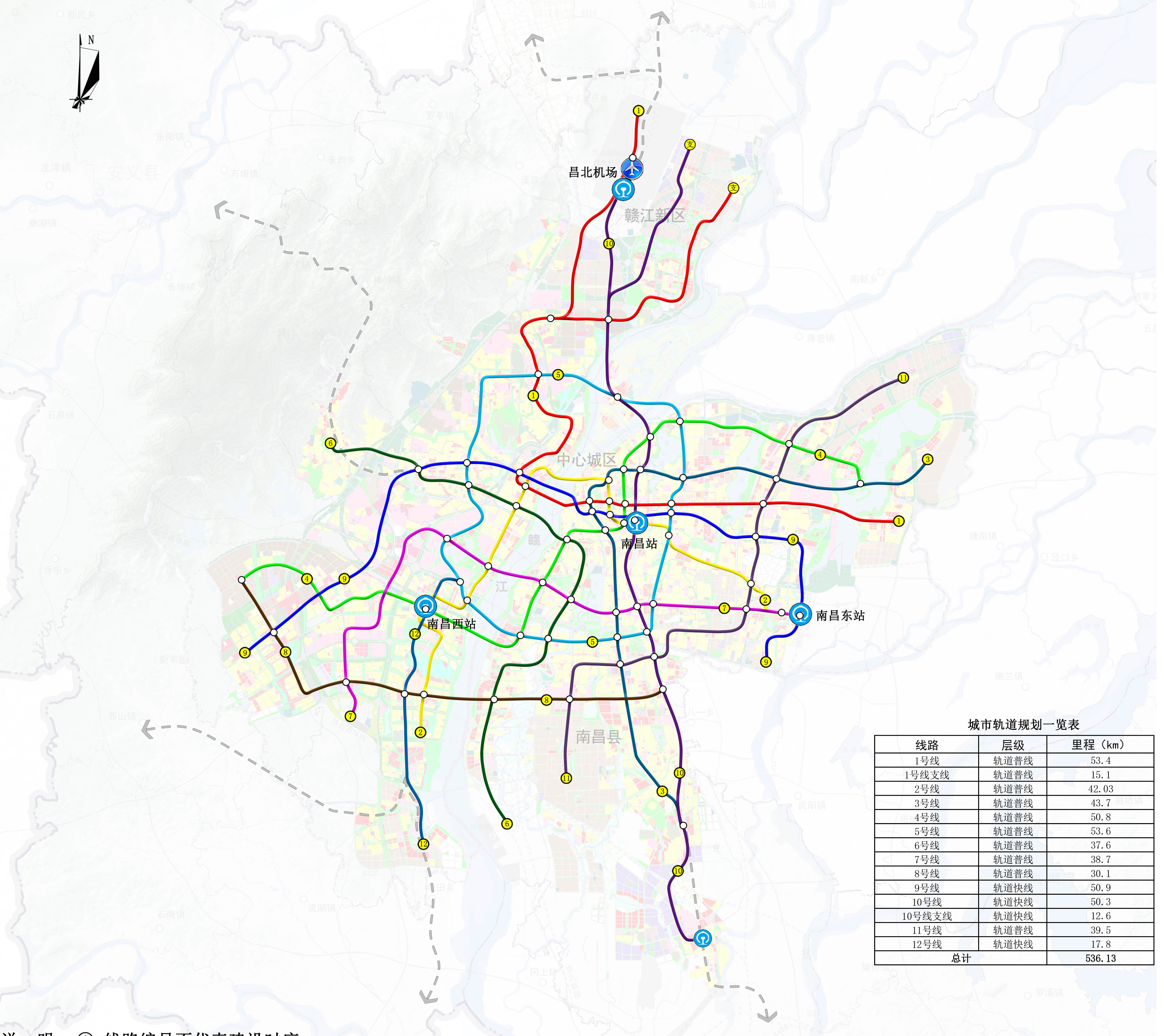
Planned network of Nanchang Metro in 2022

=== Rolling Stock ===
Nanchang Metro uses Type B rolling stock, whose cars are 2.8 m (9 ft 2 in) in width, 3.8 m (12 ft 6 in) in height and 19 m (62 ft 4 in) in length, providing the system with maximum capacity of 30,000 to 55,000 passenger per hour per direction.

=== Ticketing ===
Single ticket will be available as plastic packaged RFID coin like many other cities in China. Existing pre-payment smart cards such as local Hongcheng Tong (Chinese: 洪城通) are also expected to be used in Nanchang Metro.
