= Guanzhou station =

Guanzhou station may refer to:

- Guanzhou station (Guangzhou Metro), a station on Line 4 of the Guangzhou Metro in Guangzhou, Guangdong Province, China.
- Guanzhou station (Nanchang Metro), a station on Line 4 of the Nanchang Metro in Nanchang, Jiangxi Province, China
