= Xixia (disambiguation) =

Xixia (1038–1227) was a Tanggut-ruled empire in northwestern China.

Xixia may also refer to:

- Xixia County (西峡县), in Nanyang, Henan
- Xixia District (西夏区), in Yinchuan, Ningxia, named after the empire
- Xixia, Jiangxi (溪霞镇), a town in Nanchang, Jiangxi

== See also ==
- Xi Qia or Xi Xia (1883–1950), Chinese general
