= Taohua =

Táohuā (桃花) could refer to the following locations in China:

- Taohua, Feixi County, Anhui
- Taohua, Yu County, Hebei, town
- Taohua, Nanchang, town in Xihu District, Nanchang, Jiangxi
- Taohua, Zhoushan, town in Putuo District, Zhoushan, Zhejiang
