= People's Park (Nanchang) =

Urban public park in Donghu, Nanchang, Jiangxi, China

- Renmin Park
- Interactive map of People's Park
- Type: Urban park
- Location: Nanchang, Jiangxi, China
- Coordinates: 28°40′51″N 115°54′49″E
- Area: 32.6 ha (81 acres)
- Created: 1954

People's Park (Chinese: 人民公园; pinyin: Rénmín Gōngyuán) is an urban public park in Donghu District of central Nanchang, capital of Jiangxi province, China. Covering an area of 32.6 hectares (81 acres), it is the largest park in downtown Nanchang. It has more than 14,000 trees of 175 different species. Its layout is in the style of typical Chinese gardens of the Jiangnan region. It is popular with residents and tourists alike.

The park was established in 1954 and originally called New Park (新公园). It was renamed as People's Park in 1958. It is known for its orchid garden, which was created in 1963 at the suggestion of Marshal Zhu De. The park's name is inscribed in Zhu's calligraphy.

People's Park is located at 96 Fuzhou Road in Donghu District, south of the Jiangxi Stadium and north of the old Jiangxi Provincial Government. Admission to the park is free.
