= Jingdong, Jiangxi =

Jingdong 京东镇
- Town
- Location in Jiangxi Jingdong (China)
- Coordinates: 28°41′14″N 115°57′47″E
- Country: People's Republic of China
- Province: Jiangxi
- Prefecture-level city: Nanchang
- District: Qingshanhu District
- Time zone: UTC+8 (China Standard)

Jingdong (Chinese: 京东; pinyin: Jīngdōng) is a town in Qingshanhu District, Nanchang, Jiangxi province, China. As of 2020, it administers the following sixteen residential communities and ten villages:

- Jingdong Xiaoqu Community (京东小区社区)
- Nanyang Huayuan Community (南洋花园社区)
- Qingchun Jiayuan Community (青春家园社区)
- Yilanyuan Community (怡兰苑社区)
- Jiayuan Community (嘉苑社区)
- Aixihuxi Community (艾溪湖西社区)
- Jingze Community (京泽社区)
- Jing'an Community (京安社区)
- Chengdong Huayuan Community (城东花园社区)
- Nanfang Community (南方社区)
- Donghua Institute of Metrology Community (东华计量所家委会)
- Jinghua Community (京华社区)
- Jingrong Community (京荣社区)
- Tielujiucun First Community (铁路九村第一社区)
- Tielujiucun Second Community (铁路九村第二社区)
- Tianxiang Community (天香社区)
- Liangwan Village (梁万村)
- Taosheng Village (桃胜村)
- Taohu Village (桃湖村)
- Gaoxing Village (高兴村)
- Tangnan Village (塘南村)
- Hexing Village (何兴村)
- Taozhu Village (桃竹村)
- Huangcheng Village (黄城村)
- Liansheng Village (联胜村)
- Yuefang Village (月坊村)
