= Xixia, Jiangxi =

Xixia 溪霞镇
- Town
- Location in Jiangxi Xixia (China)
- Coordinates: 28°51′33″N 115°50′25″E
- Country: China
- Province: Jiangxi
- Prefecture-level city: Nanchang
- District: Xinjian District
- Time zone: UTC+8 (China Standard)

Xixia (Chinese: 溪霞; pinyin: Xīxiá) is a town of Xinjian District, Nanchang, Jiangxi, China. As of 2020, it administers Xinxi Street Community (新溪街道社区) and the following 15 villages:

- Xixia Village
- Nanping Village (南坪村)
- Wushi Village (乌石村)
- Wanfu Village (万福村)
- Qiaonan Village (桥南村)
- Dianqian Village (店前村)
- Xianli Village (仙里村)
- Qiaoling Village (乔岭村)
- Taohua Village (桃花村)
- Ganshe Village (甘舍村)
- Huzhao Village (胡赵村)
- Shiju Village (石咀村)
- Baiguo Village (白果村)
- Chihai Village (赤海村)
- Shenjia Village (申家村)
