= Donghu, Nanchang =

Donghu 东湖区
- District
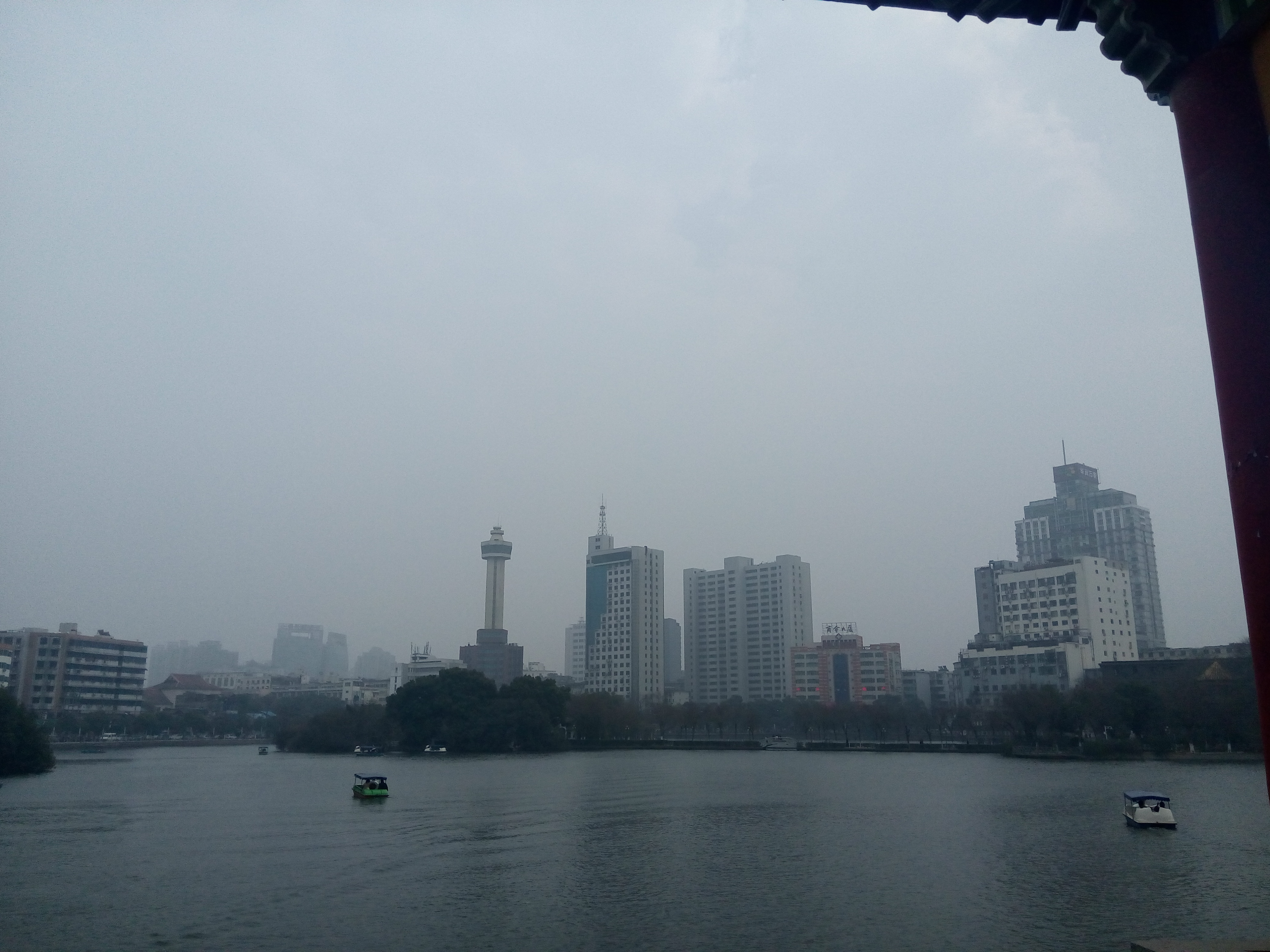
- Donghu (East Lake)

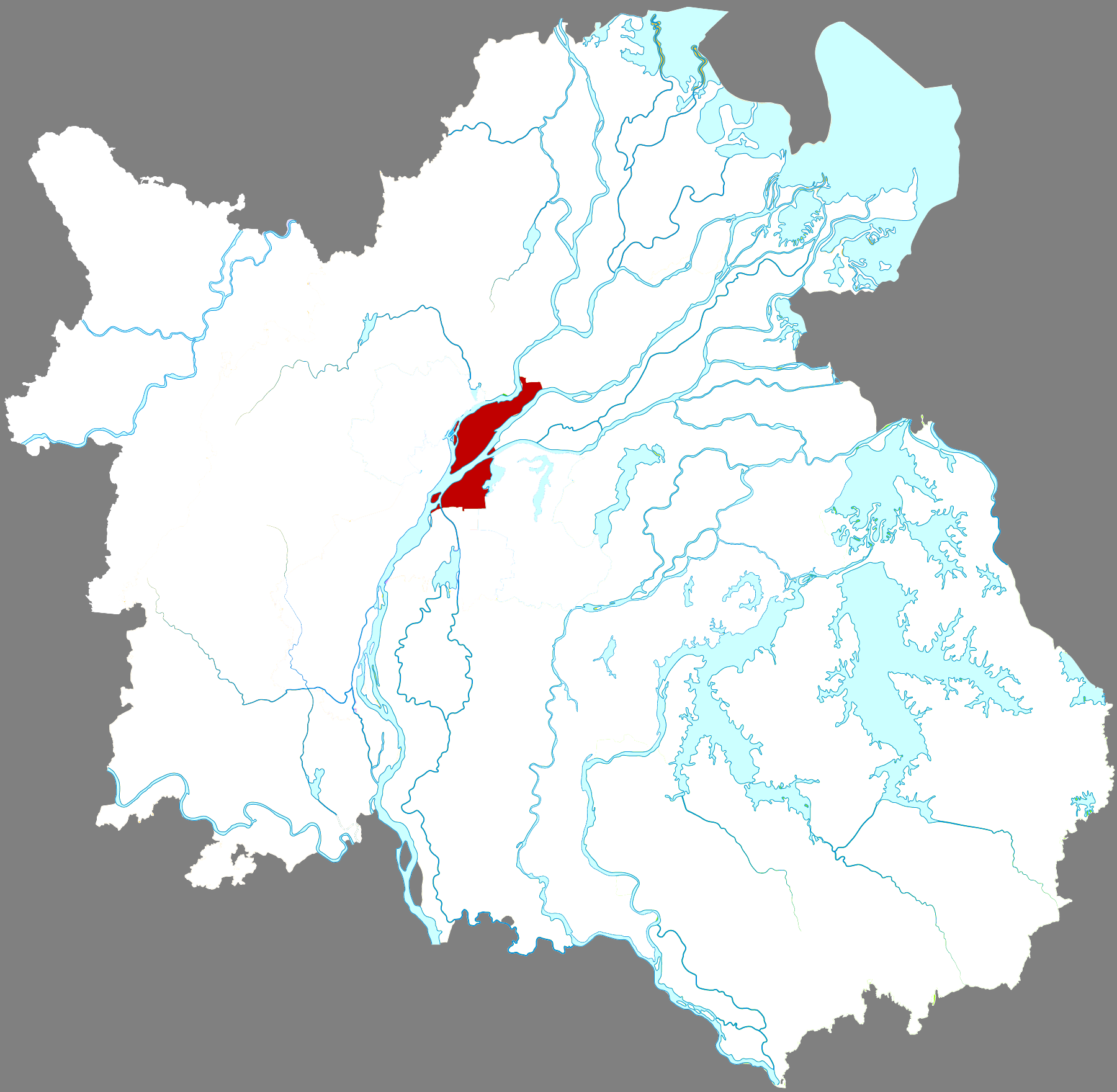
- Donghu (This shows the East Lake where the name of Donghu was originally from)
- Coordinates (Bayi Park): 28°40′44″N 115°53′49″E
- Country: People's Republic of China
- Province: Jiangxi
- Prefecture-level city: Nanchang

Area
  - Total: 56.95 km^{2} (21.99 sq mi)

Population (2018)
  - Total: 501,596
  - Density: 8,808/km^{2} (22,810/sq mi)
- Time zone: UTC+8 (China Standard)
- Postal code: 330000

Donghu District (simplified Chinese: 东湖区; traditional Chinese: 東湖區; pinyin: Dōnghú Qū; lit. 'east lake district') is one of 6 urban districts of the prefecture-level city of Nanchang, the capital of Jiangxi Province, China. The district was created in the Tang dynasty when a bridge was built across Nanchang's Taihu lake, dividing the area into the East and West Lake districts. It covers over 56.95 square kilometres (21.99 sq mi) with a population of 482,000 as of 2019. Among them, the urban resident population is 476,300, and the population urbanization rate is 98.83%. The birth rate was 8.68%, and the natural growth rate was 3.2%. People's Park, the largest public park in downtown Nanchang, is located in Donghu.

== Toponymy ==
The district's name in Chinese literally means "East Lake" which refers to Nanchang's East Lake. Donghu is also referred to in Lei Cizong's Records of Yuzhang, written during the Liu Song dynasty.

== History ==
During the Northern Wei dynasty, Li Daoyuan's Commentary on the Water Classic calls the lake Taihu, but it has been called Dong Hu (East Lake) since the Tang and Song dynasties.

The district contains five gates of the old city of Nanchang, dating to the Qing dynasty - Zhangjiang Gate, Desheng Gate, Yonghe Gate, Guangrun Gate, and a part of Hue Gate. Three historic streets (Middle Street, West Street, East Street), are all within one jurisdiction which later became Donghu District.

In 1926, after Nanchang was officially a city, it had different districts.

The government divided the jurisdiction of the area into two districts at the beginning of 1949 but did not give them distinct names and merged into one. Then, the first and second districts were restored in August 1951, and in April 1955, they were renamed Donghu District and Shengli District, respectively. In June 1980, the two districts later merged into one Donghu District.

In 2019, Donghu District's two sub-districts and one town (Shajin subdistrict, Weidong subdistrict, Shengmi town) were placed under the jurisdiction of Honggutan District.

== Geography ==
Donghu District is in the northeast of Nanchang, between 28°40'15''-28°47'50'' north latitude and 115°50'39''-115°58'50'' east longitude.

From south to north, it is bounded by Hongdu North Avenue, Fudayoudi, the southern branch of Ganjiang River, Qingshanhu District, and Nanchang County; Donghu is also bounded by Xihu District to the south (which includes Beijing West Road, the south part of Bayi Square, Bayi Avenue, Zhongshan Road, and the Zhongshan Bridge), Xinjian District and Qingshanhu District to the west, and the Xinjian district and Nanchang county to the north.

In the southwest, the landscape of the Donghu District is high, whereas, in the northeast, it is flat. The highest point in Donghu District is 27.2 meters above sea level, while the lowest point is 16.4 meters above sea level.

=== Climate ===
The yearly average temperature of the Donghu District is 17.5 °C (63.5 °F). The monthly mean temperature in January is 5.0 °C (41 °F), and the mean in July is 29.6 °C (85.28 °F). The record cold temperature recorded in this area is -9.3 °C (15.26 °F), recorded in February 1972, and the record hot temperature is 40.6 °C (105.08 °F), recorded in July 1961.

The annual average sunshine hours are 1903.9 hours, and the annual total radiation is 4819 kcal/cm^{2}.

== Demographics ==
Population census

Year	Pop.	±% p.a.
2016	527,473	—
2017	508,461	−3.60%
2018	503,610	−0.95%

Year	Pop.	±% p.a.
2019	481,978	−4.30%
2020	433,377	−10.08%

Donghu District statistical bulletin

=== 2016 - 2019 ===
As of the 2016 to 2019 Donghu District National Economic and Social Development Statistical Report, the census reports that the population dropped from 527,473 to 481,978. At the end of 2019, there were 476,315 urban resident population.

The birth rate also dropped from 9.78‰ including 5,137 newborns in 2016 to 8.68‰ including 4,277 newborns in 2019. From 2016 to 2019, other statistics include a drop in natural growth rate from 4.14‰ to 3.20‰ and a drop in death rate from 5.64‰ to 5.47‰.

=== 2020 ===
As of the 2020 Donghu District National Economic and Social Development Statistical Report, the census reports that the population was 433,377, including 214,620 males and 218757 females.

There were 3,460 newborns with a birth rate of 6.07‰ including 1,792 males and 1,668 females. Other statistic includes a 1.93‰ natural growth rate and a 4.13‰ death rate with a 2,357 death population.

== Administrative divisions ==
Donghu District is divided into 9 subdistricts and 1 town:

- Dayuan (大院街道)
- Dongjiayao (董家窑街道)
- Gongyuan (公园街道)
- Baihuazhou (百花洲街道)
- Dunzitang (墩子塘街道)
- Yuzhang (豫章街道)
- Bayiqiao (八一桥街道)
- Tengwangge (滕王阁街道)
- Yangzizhou (扬子洲镇)
- Pengjiaqiao (彭家桥街道)

== Tourism ==
- Pavilion of Prince Teng, one of the Four Great Towers of China, also one of the Three Great Towers of Jiangnan
- Baihuazhou
- Youmin Temple, provincial historical and cultural site protected unit
- Bayi Park (Chinese: 八一公园), built around Donghu
- Bayi Square, one of the largest city squares in the world
- SupuChunshu, one of the Ten Scenery of Yuzhang
- People's Park
- Shuiguanyin Pavilion (Chinese: 水观音亭)
- Acacia Park (Chinese: 相思林公园)

== Education ==
- Nanchang University, one of China's Project 211
- Jiangxi University of Traditional Chinese Medicine, ranked 43rd in Chinese medical universities on CUCAS
- Jiangxi University of Finance and Economics
- Nanchang Yuzhang Middle School (Chinese: 南昌市豫章中学)
- Nanchang No.28 Middle School (Chinese: 南昌市第二十八中学)
- Nanchang Experimental Middle School (Chinese: 南昌市实验中学)
- Nanchang Bayi Middle School (Chinese: 南昌市八一中学)

== Notable people ==
- Shi Daocan, Song dynasty poet
- Wang Fu, Song dynasty poet and politician
- Zhang Huang, Ming dynasty philosopher and educator
- Shu Yuejing, Ming dynasty educator and scholar
- Wan Shihua, Ming dynasty scholar
