= Xinjian, Nanchang =

Xinjian 新建区
- District
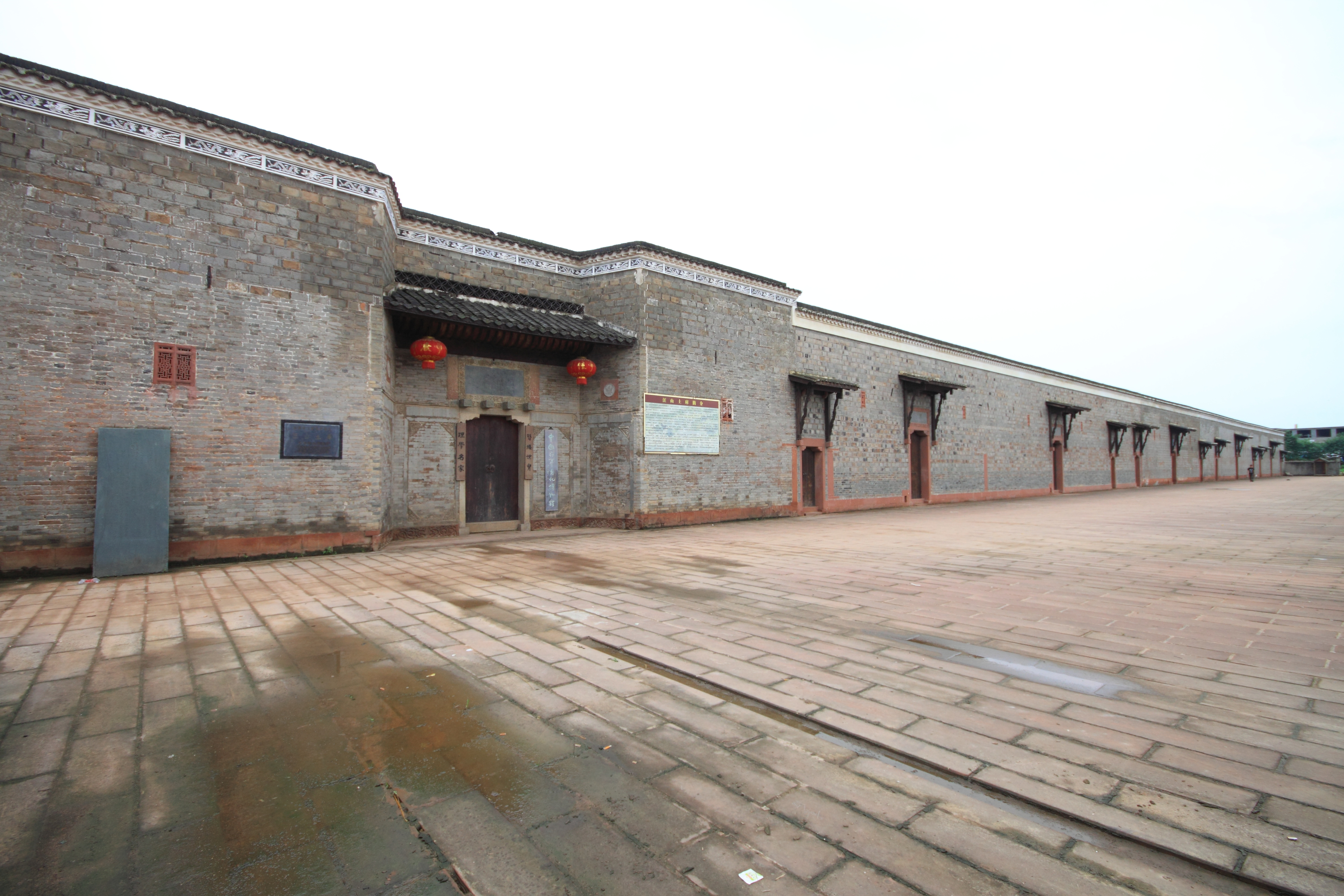
- Interactive map of Xinjian
- Coordinates: 28°41′34″N 115°48′55″E
- Country: China
- Province: Jiangxi
- Prefecture-level city: Nanchang

Area
  - Total: 2,121.1 km^{2} (819.0 sq mi)

Population (2019)
  - Total: 709,600
  - Density: 334.5/km^{2} (866.5/sq mi)
- Time zone: UTC+8 (China Standard)
- Postal code: 330100

Xinjian (Chinese: 新建区; pinyin: Xīnjiàn Qū) is one of 6 urban districts of the prefecture-level city of Nanchang, the capital of Jiangxi Province, China, located on the western (left) bank of the Gan River. It consists of two disjoint sections to the north and south of Wanli and Qingshanhu districts.

In 1999 it had a population of 643,535.

== Administrative divisions ==
Xinjian District is divided to 12 towns and 7 townships.

12 towns

- Changpo (长堎镇)
- Wangcheng (望城镇)
- Shengmi (生米镇)
- Xishan (西山镇)
- Shigang (石岗镇)
- Songhu (松湖镇)
- Qiaohe (樵舍镇)
- Lehua (乐化镇)
- Xixia (溪霞镇)
- Xiangshan (象山镇)
- Shibu (石埠镇)
- Lianwei (联圩镇)

7 townships

- Liuhu (流湖乡)
- Houtian (厚田乡)
- Jinqiao (金桥乡)
- Tiehe (铁河乡)
- Datangping (大塘坪乡)
- Changyi (昌邑乡)
- Nanji (南矶乡)

== Climate ==
Climate data for Xinjian, elevation 40 m (130 ft), (1991–2020 normals, extremes 1981–2010)
Month	Jan	Feb	Mar	Apr	May	Jun	Jul	Aug	Sep	Oct	Nov	Dec	Year
Record high °C (°F)	25.5 (77.9)	28.5 (83.3)	33.2 (91.8)	35.3 (95.5)	35.6 (96.1)	37.9 (100.2)	40.9 (105.6)	40.4 (104.7)	39.0 (102.2)	36.6 (97.9)	31.1 (88.0)	23.4 (74.1)	40.9 (105.6)
Mean daily maximum °C (°F)	9.3 (48.7)	12.2 (54.0)	16.3 (61.3)	22.8 (73.0)	27.5 (81.5)	30.1 (86.2)	33.9 (93.0)	33.5 (92.3)	29.8 (85.6)	24.7 (76.5)	18.4 (65.1)	12.1 (53.8)	22.6 (72.6)
Daily mean °C (°F)	6.1 (43.0)	8.5 (47.3)	12.4 (54.3)	18.5 (65.3)	23.5 (74.3)	26.4 (79.5)	29.9 (85.8)	29.5 (85.1)	25.8 (78.4)	20.5 (68.9)	14.3 (57.7)	8.4 (47.1)	18.7 (65.6)
Mean daily minimum °C (°F)	3.7 (38.7)	5.9 (42.6)	9.5 (49.1)	15.3 (59.5)	20.2 (68.4)	23.5 (74.3)	26.7 (80.1)	26.4 (79.5)	22.8 (73.0)	17.4 (63.3)	11.4 (52.5)	5.7 (42.3)	15.7 (60.3)
Record low °C (°F)	−4.3 (24.3)	−6.2 (20.8)	−1.3 (29.7)	3.5 (38.3)	9.5 (49.1)	14.5 (58.1)	19.0 (66.2)	19.3 (66.7)	14.1 (57.4)	3.3 (37.9)	−1.5 (29.3)	−9.8 (14.4)	−9.8 (14.4)
Average precipitation mm (inches)	76.8 (3.02)	87.7 (3.45)	172.5 (6.79)	211.9 (8.34)	227.7 (8.96)	316.6 (12.46)	185.3 (7.30)	120.0 (4.72)	66.5 (2.62)	46.4 (1.83)	86.0 (3.39)	49.2 (1.94)	1,646.6 (64.82)
Average precipitation days (≥ 0.1 mm)	12.7	13.0	17.1	16.4	15.1	16.4	11.4	10.9	6.7	6.8	9.2	9.6	145.3
Average snowy days	3.1	1.8	0.4	0	0	0	0	0	0	0	0.1	1.1	6.5
Average relative humidity (%)	72	73	75	74	74	79	72	73	71	66	69	68	72
Mean monthly sunshine hours	82.2	86.3	95.5	118.2	136.4	126.0	211.7	203.2	177.4	164.6	129.0	117.0	1,647.5
Percentage possible sunshine	25	27	26	31	33	30	50	50	48	47	41	37	37
Source: China Meteorological Administration
