= Nanchang County =

Nanchang 南昌县
- County
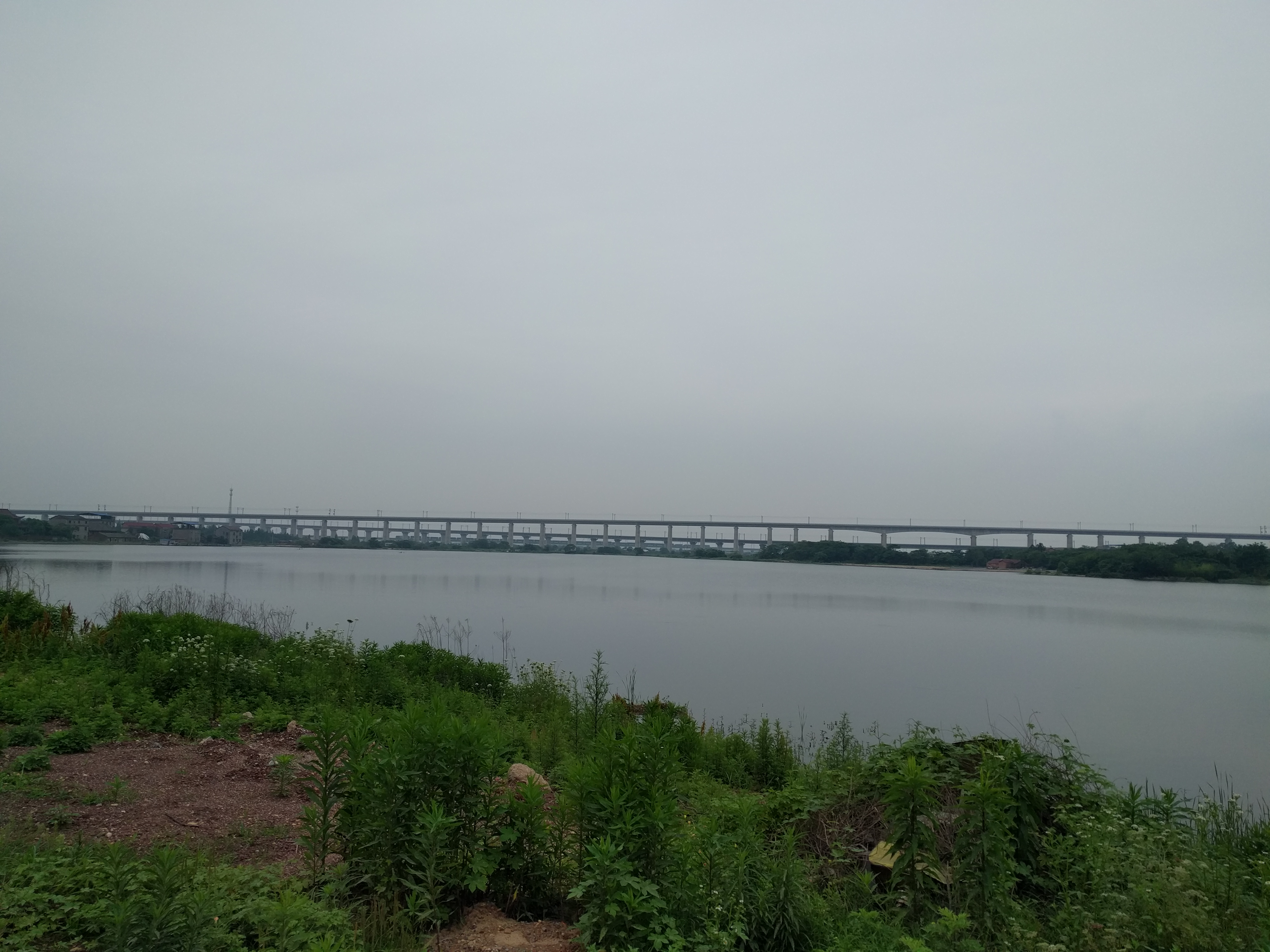
- Interactive map of Nanchang
- Coordinates: 28°33′29″N 115°55′59″E
- Country: People's Republic of China
- Province: Jiangxi
- Prefecture-level city: Nanchang

Area
  - Total: 1,810.7 km^{2} (699.1 sq mi)

Population (2019)
  - Total: 1,058,294
  - Density: 584.47/km^{2} (1,513.8/sq mi)
- Time zone: UTC+8 (China Standard)
- Postal code: 330200

Nanchang County (Chinese: 南昌县; pinyin: Nánchāng Xiàn) is a county of Jiangxi Province, China. It is under the administration of the prefecture-level city of Nanchang, the provincial capital.

The population in 1999 was 986,031.

== Administration ==
Nanchang County has 11 towns and 7 townships.

=== Towns ===
- Liantang (莲塘镇)
- Xiangtang (向塘镇)
- Sanjiang (三江镇)
- Jiangxiang (蒋巷镇)
- Youlan (幽兰镇)
- Tangnan (塘南镇)
- Gangshang (冈上镇)
- Wuyang (武阳镇)
- Guangfu (广福镇)
- Changdong (昌东镇)
- Maqiu (麻丘镇)

=== Townships ===
- Nanxin (南新乡)
- Tacheng (塔城乡)
- Jingkou (泾口乡)
- Bayi (八一乡)
- Huangma (黄马乡)
- Fushan (富山乡)
- Dongxin (东新乡)

== Climate ==
Climate data for Nanchang County, elevation 32 m (105 ft), (1991–2020 normals)
Month	Jan	Feb	Mar	Apr	May	Jun	Jul	Aug	Sep	Oct	Nov	Dec	Year
Mean daily maximum °C (°F)	9.3 (48.7)	12.2 (54.0)	16.8 (62.2)	23.0 (73.4)	27.6 (81.7)	30.3 (86.5)	34.3 (93.7)	33.6 (92.5)	29.7 (85.5)	24.5 (76.1)	18.2 (64.8)	11.7 (53.1)	22.6 (72.7)
Daily mean °C (°F)	6.0 (42.8)	8.4 (47.1)	12.7 (54.9)	18.6 (65.5)	23.5 (74.3)	26.4 (79.5)	30.0 (86.0)	29.4 (84.9)	25.7 (78.3)	20.4 (68.7)	14.1 (57.4)	8.0 (46.4)	18.6 (65.5)
Mean daily minimum °C (°F)	3.6 (38.5)	5.7 (42.3)	9.7 (49.5)	15.2 (59.4)	20.2 (68.4)	23.5 (74.3)	26.6 (79.9)	26.3 (79.3)	22.7 (72.9)	17.4 (63.3)	11.2 (52.2)	5.2 (41.4)	15.6 (60.1)
Average precipitation mm (inches)	72.0 (2.83)	97.6 (3.84)	170.0 (6.69)	199.6 (7.86)	217.7 (8.57)	318.1 (12.52)	169.4 (6.67)	121.1 (4.77)	63.9 (2.52)	48.0 (1.89)	93.9 (3.70)	56.1 (2.21)	1,627.4 (64.07)
Average precipitation days	12.1	13.2	17.0	16.3	15.0	15.7	10.6	10.4	6.9	6.9	9.8	9.2	143.1
Average snowy days	2.8	1.5	0.2	0	0	0	0	0	0	0	0	1	5.5
Average relative humidity (%)	75	77	77	76	76	80	73	73	73	70	74	71	75
Mean monthly sunshine hours	79.1	77.9	94.2	122.8	136.8	130.3	221.6	210.0	172.1	151.7	125.1	116.1	1,637.7
Percentage possible sunshine	24	24	25	32	33	31	52	52	47	43	39	36	37
Source: China Meteorological Administration
