= Xihu, Nanchang =

District of Nanchang, Jiangxi, China

Xihu 西湖区
- District
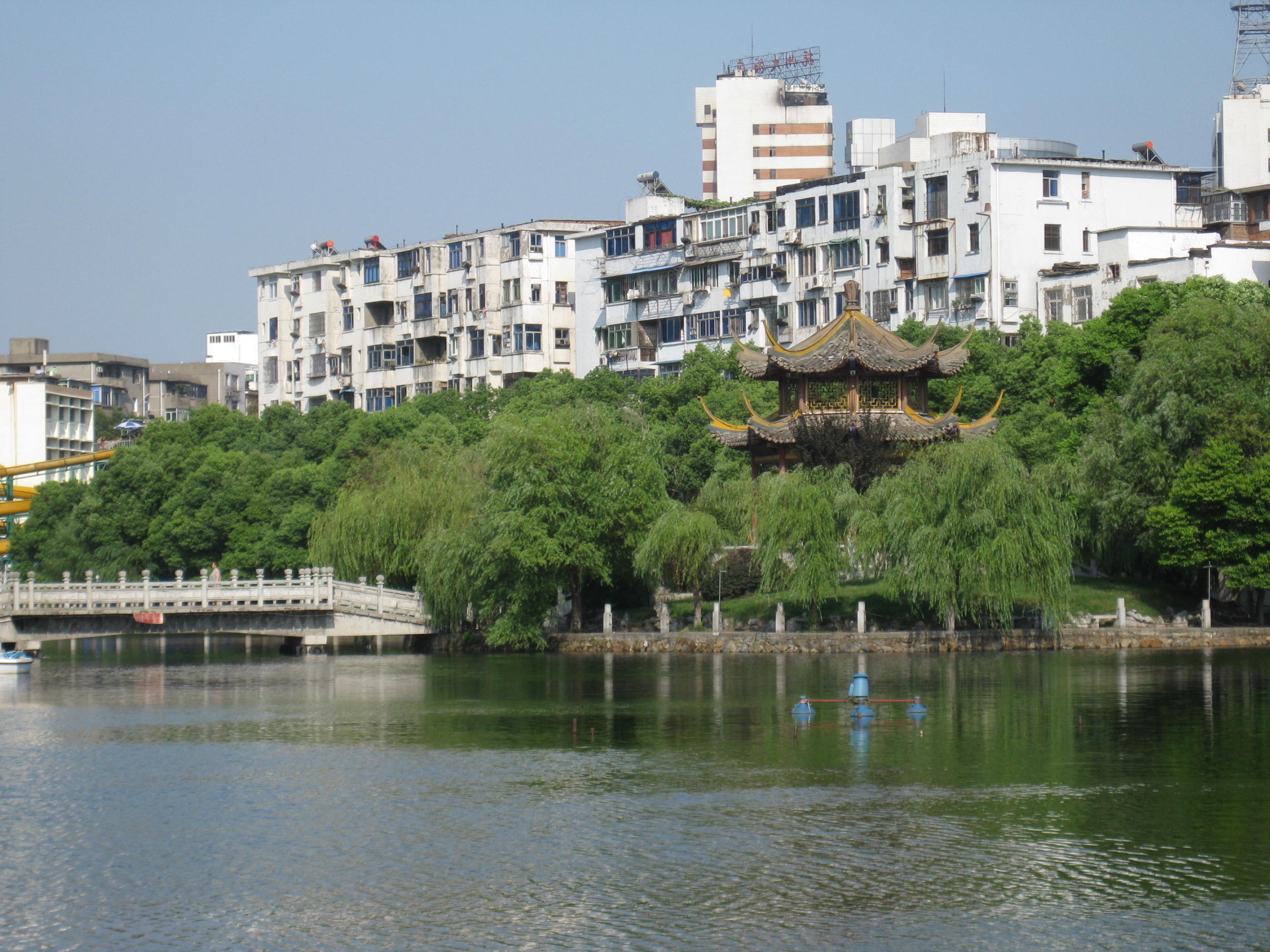
- Interactive map of Xihu
- Coordinates: 28°39′27″N 115°52′38″E
- Country: People's Republic of China
- Province: Jiangxi
- Prefecture-level city: Nanchang

Area
  - Total: 34.8 km^{2} (13.4 sq mi)

Population (2019)
  - Total: 495,600
  - Density: 14,200/km^{2} (36,900/sq mi)
- Time zone: UTC+8 (China Standard)
- Postal code: 330009

Xihu District (Chinese: 西湖区; pinyin: Xīhú Qū), literally meaning "west lake district", is one of six urban districts of the prefecture-level city of Nanchang, the capital of Jiangxi Province, China. The district was created in the Tang dynasty when a bridge was built across Nanchang's Taihu lake, dividing the area into the East and West Lake districts. It covers over 39 square kilometers and as of 2004 had a population of 460,000.

== Administrative divisions ==
Xihu District is divided into 10 subdistricts and 1 town.

10 subdistricts

- Shenjinta (绳金塔街道)
- Taoyuan (桃源街道)
- Chaoyangzhou (朝阳洲街道)
- Guangrunmen (广润门街道)
- Nanpu (南浦街道)
- Xihu (西湖街道)
- Simazhuang (系马桩街道)
- Shizijie (十字街街道)
- Dinggonglu (丁公路街道)
- Nanzhan (南站街道)

1 town

- Taohua (桃花镇)
