= Qingshanhu, Nanchang =

Qingshanhu 青山湖区
- District
- Interactive map of Qingshanhu
- Coordinates: 28°40′59″N 115°57′43″E
- Country: People's Republic of China
- Province: Jiangxi
- Prefecture-level city: Nanchang

Area
  - Total: 127.6 km^{2} (49.3 sq mi)

Population (2019)
  - Total: 640,000
  - Density: 5,000/km^{2} (13,000/sq mi)
- Time zone: UTC+8 (China Standard)
- Postal code: 330006

Qingshanhu District (Chinese: 青山湖区; pinyin: Qīngshānhú Qū), is one of 6 urban districts of the prefecture-level city of Nanchang, the capital of Jiangxi Province, China. It covers over 120 km^{2} (46 sq mi), and as of 2003 had a population of 670,000.

== Administrative divisions ==
Qingshanhu is divided into 3 sub-districts, and 6 towns.

=== Sub-districts ===
- Qingshanlu (青山路街道)
- Shanghailu (上海路街道)
- Nangang (南钢街道)

=== Towns ===
- Jingdong (京东镇)
- Hufang (湖坊镇)
- Tangshan (塘山镇)
- Luojia (罗家镇)
- Jiaoqiao (蛟桥镇)
- Yangzizhou (扬子洲乡)- is upgraded from township
