= List of foreign-language schools in China =

This is a list of foreign language schools in China, organized by geographic region.

== Eastern China ==
- Nanjing Foreign Language School, Jiangsu
- Changzhou Foreign Languages School, Changzhou
- Hangzhou Foreign Languages School, Zhejiang
- Shanghai Foreign Language School, Shanghai
- Jinan Foreign Language School, Shandong
- Nanchang Foreign Language School, Jiangxi
- Pudong Foreign Languages School, Shanghai
- Suzhou Foreign Language School, Jiangsu
- LTL Language School, Shanghai
- Shanghai MEIZHI Mandarin School, Shanghai

== Western China ==
- Chengdu Foreign Languages School, Sichuan
- Chongqing Foreign Language School, Chongqing

== Northern China ==
- Tianjin Foreign Languages School, Tianjin
- Taiyuan Foreign Language School, Shanxi
- Hebei Tangshan Foreign Language School, Hebei
- LTL Language School, Beijing

== Southern China ==
- English School Attached to Guangdong University of Foreign Studies. Guangdong
- Fuzhou Foreign Language School, Fujian
- Shenzhen Foreign Languages School, Guangdong
- Xiamen Foreign Language School, Fujian
- Shenzhen Foreign Languages GBA Academy, Guangdong

== Central China ==
- Wuhan Foreign Languages School, Hubei
- Shijiazhuang Foreign Language School, Hebei
- Zhengzhou Foreign Language School, Henan

== Northeastern China ==
- Changchun Foreign Languages School, Jilin

== See also ==
- List of language education in China
- School of Foreign Languages and Cultures of NNU (founded in 1898)
