= WFLS =

WFLS may refer to:

- WFLS-FM, a radio station in Fredericksburg, Virginia.
- Wuhan Foreign Languages School, a secondary school in China.
