= Qirui =

Qirui may refer to:

- Cai Qirui, a Chinese chemist, educator and academician
- Duan Qirui, a Chinese warlord and politician
- Lai Qirui, Chinese footballer
- Chery Automobile, also known by its Chinese name Qirui
