= Sfls =

SFLS may refer to:

- San Francisco Law School
- Shenzhen Foreign Languages School
- Shanghai Foreign Language School
