= Taiyuan Foreign Language School =

Public school in Shanxi, China

- 太原市外国语学校
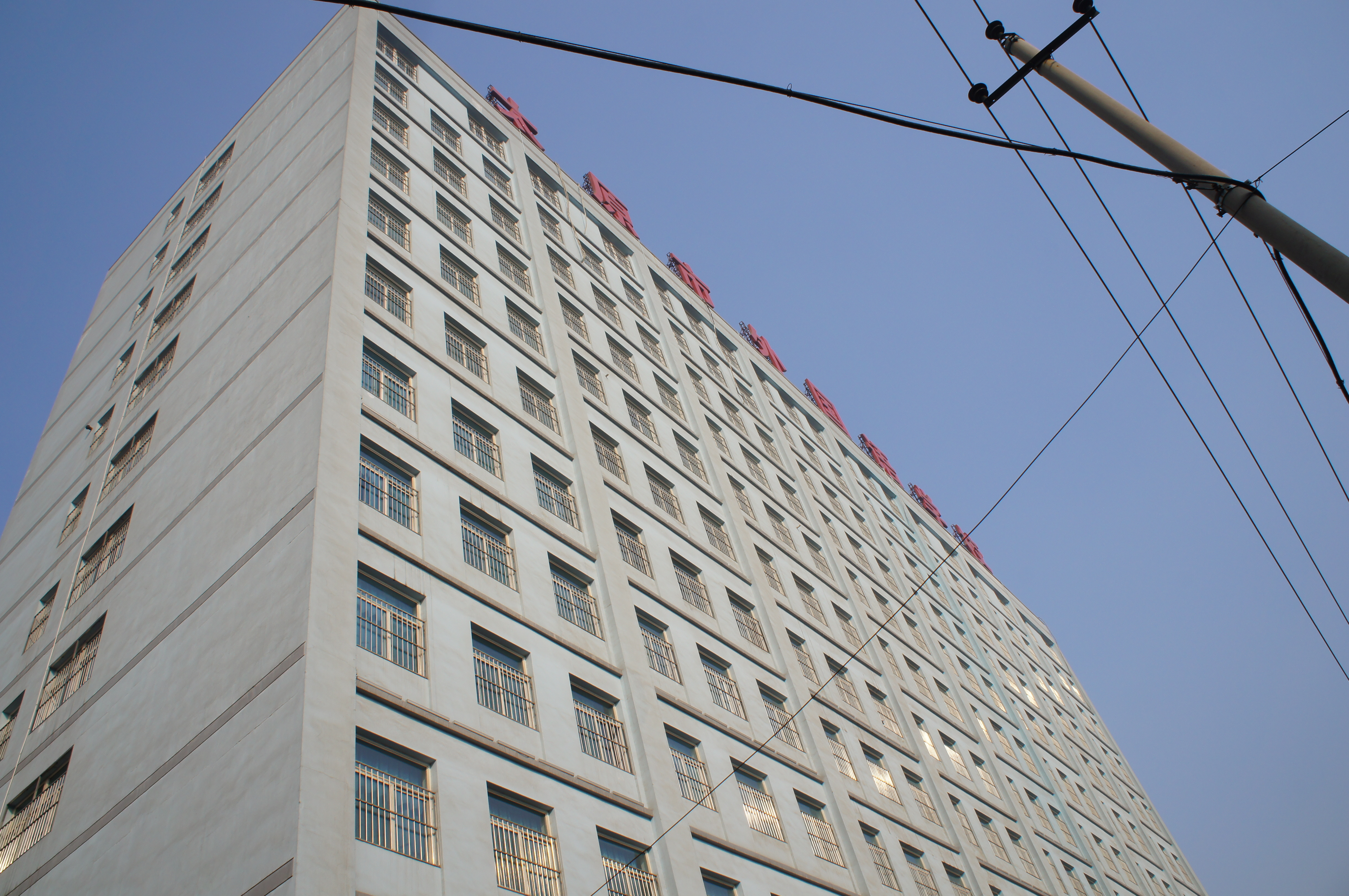
- The exterior of the high school section building

Location
- Yifenyuan, Yifen Street; Taiyuan, Shanxi; China

Information
- Type: Public
- Motto: 启智以明德，笃行以致远。
- Established: 1984
- School district: Wanbailin
- Principal: Wu Fanwang (武翻旺)
- Faculty: 180 (as of 2009)
- Enrollment: Circa 3,000
- Nickname: Waiguoyu (外国语), Taiwai (太外)
- Affiliations: The Ministry of Education, People's Republic of China and Taiyuan Municipal Education Bureau
- Website: Official website (in Simplified Chinese)

Taiyuan Foreign Language School (TFLS, Chinese: 太原市外国语学校) is a secondary school, a comprehensive public middle school and high school, located in Taiyuan, Shanxi, China. It is one of the first foreign language schools in China, and one of the 17 foreign language schools that are recognized by the Ministry of Education. Locally, TFLS has one of the most competitive admission standards, and has been awarded "Key High School of Shanxi Province" and "Demonstrative High School of Shanxi Province" by Shanxi Provincial Ministry of Education.

Founded in 1909 as Taiyuan Women's Normal School, Taiyuan Foreign Language School is now co-ed, and devotes its efforts to educating students to be adept in foreign languages, academically well-rounded, and familiar with both Chinese and Western cultures.

TFLS enrolls students from grades 7 through 12 and is famous for quality foreign language courses and other subjects. Along with 16 other foreign language schools including Nanjing Foreign Language School (NFLS), Shanghai Foreign Language School (SFLS), TFLS is eligible to recommend 12th-grade students to first-tier domestic universities annually via early admissions, prior to Gaokao.

== History ==
Taiyuan Foreign Language School was founded in 1984. The campus at the time of the founding was located at Guoshi Street, across Fen River. In the early 1990s, TFLS relocated to its new campus in Yifenyuan, in the west bank of Fen River. The relocation also split the school into two schools: Taiyuan Foreign Language School, which relocated, and Taiyuan No. 18 Middle School, which still occupies the Guoshi campus.

== Facilities ==
After more than 20 years of development, Taiyuan Foreign Language School has separate campuses for the middle school section (初中部), the high school section (高中部), and Phoenix Bilingual School (branch).

The 12-story building for the high school section was put in use in September 2009. The high school section building covers 1.15 acres and has a total building area of 21,100 square meters. It is also facilitated with a two-storey-high lecture hall, which provides the venue for guest lectures and performing events. North of the senior high school building is a 4.78-acre standard sport field, with 400m plastic athletic tracks, basketball fields, and badminton fields. Also, the high school section building has a good view of Yifen Park, which borders and integrates with the high school campus. The high school building also features a library on the 10th floor, which has spacious reading and study rooms, and computer labs.

The Yifenyuan campus is occupied by the middle school section and Phoenix Bilingual School, across the street from the high school section.

== Academics ==
Taiyuan Foreign Language School (excluding the international section) adopts Chinese middle school and high school curricula. In the first two years of high school, every student has to take classes in Chinese, mathematics, foreign language, moral education, history, geography, physics, chemistry, biology, physical education, music, and fine arts. In their senior year, students in the humanities and social sciences pathway only take Chinese, mathematics, foreign language, moral education, history, geography, and physical education classes. Students in the science pathway only take Chinese, mathematics, foreign language, physics, chemistry, biology, and physical education classes. Class schedules are fixed except for elective classes.

There are three types of classes in the high school section. The first type is general class (Chinese: 普通班), which students automatically get in and makes up most of the student body. Students need to take examinations to get into experimental class (Chinese: 实验班) or smaller experimental class (honors class, Chinese: 小实验班). What differentiates the latter from the former is that the honors classes usually have smaller class size and are equipped with specially-selected teachers. There are no more than two honors classes in 11th and 12th grades, one for the humanities and social sciences pathway and the other for the sciences pathway.

=== Foreign Language Courses ===
The size of foreign language classes is usually under 30 to encourage students' class participation and student-teacher interactions. In addition to generally used textbooks, English classes also adopts its special textbook to provide students with more international and interesting reading materials. Besides traditional teaching methods, students also learn the special English textbook through telling stories and perform by themselves to develop interests in English.

=== Foreign Language Classes Offered ===
English Japanese Russian German French Spanish

== Admissions ==
TFLS middle school section's entrance examination is held annually at the Yifenyuan campus. Prospective students of the entering class are recommended by their respective elementary schools to take this examination. Admission decisions are made based on the results of this exam. The content of the examination varies from year to year, but usually includes English, Chinese and mathematics.

As for admissions of the high school section, TFLS (excluding Fenghuang branch) has four admission channels: tongzhao (统招), bi-foreign-language courses (双外语班), international courses (国际班), and zexiao (择校). TFLS admits middle school graduates through High School Entrance Examination, held by the Provincial Department of Education of Shanxi. In the years of 2012, 2013, and 2014, Taiyuan Foreign Language School's admission standards all ranked 4th in Taiyuan, only after the High School Affiliated to Shanxi University, Taiyuan No. 5 Middle School, and Shanxi Experimental Secondary School.

== College Matriculation ==
In general, 99% of TFLS graduates are enrolled at four-year higher education institutions at home or abroad.

Through Gaokao(college entrance examination) and the recommendation system, example domestic colleges that TFLS graduates attend in the recent few years include: Peking University, Tsinghua University, Zhejiang University, Renmin University of China, Shanghai International Studies University, and Beijing Foreign Studies University etc. Approximately 90% of each class take either the Gaokao or are recommended to domestic universities.

The school authority encourages students choosing to pursue their higher learning overseas. TFLS graduates have also been enrolled in international colleges, including Duke University and Brown University in the United States, The Chinese University of Hong Kong in Hong Kong SAR, University of Toronto in Canada, and Waseda University in Japan etc. Approximately 10% of each class choose to attend international colleges and universities.

== Sports ==
Basketball is a traditional school sport of TFLS. Taiyuan Foreign Language School Men's Basketball Varsity Team was crowned national champion in the 2011 National High School Basketball Championship in China. This is the first time for a Taiyuan-based high school to win this national championship.

== Honors ==
Key high school of Shanxi province

Demonstrative high school of Shanxi province

National Base for Chinese language promotion

Qualified to recommend students to Peking University through the principal (北京大学校长实名推荐制) and Tsinghua University (清华大学新百年领军计划) (2012, 2013, and 2014)

High-quality feeder of Tsinghua University, Zhejiang University, University of Science and Technology Beijing, China University of Mining and Technology, and Beijing University of Chemical Technology

== See also ==
List of Foreign Language Schools in China
