= Zhi Yueying =

Zhi Yueying (Chinese: 支月英; pinyin: Zhī yuè yīng; born May 1961) is a Chinese educator teaching at Bath Town, Fengxin County, Yichun City, Jiangxi Province, an impoverished area. She dedicated her life to improving children's education in impoverished areas, providing them with opportunities to change their social status. She invented new education techniques specialized for rural children. She also provided financial aid to children in need. She is a member of the Chinese Communist Party (CCP).

== Early life ==
Zhi was born in Nanchang City's Jin-xian County in May 1961. When she was 17, she began to study at the predecessor of Jiangxi Agricultural University. At that time, she received a letter from her classmate Cai Jiangning, asking if she would consider a post at a primary school where he worked in the mountains. Zhi took the recruiting test, passed it, and became a member of the teaching staff at the school.

== Career ==
In 1980, there was a scarcity of teachers in rural villages in Fengxin County, Jiangxi Province. The location of the school scared many teachers from coming, but Yueying lived in this condition for 41 years. To support more students, she used her holidays to do labor work, including carrying wood and bamboo. She believes that education opportunities should also be available to rural children, allowing them to choose to stay or go to the city. Over the span of 41 years, she provided education to more than 1000 children. Before her arrival, the school was in despair, so Yueying bought all the materials and fixed it herself.

The tremendous amount of work did result in health issues. Yueying was often tired and dizzy. Her high blood pressure led to retinal hemorrhages. At one point, she got in a car accident with a truck, putting her in a coma. Because Yueying did not want to delay class, she did not go down the mountain in time to seek medical treatment. Consequently, she missed the best treatment time, which resulted in deafness in the right ear and blindness in her right eye.

On October 18, 2003, she was lecturing despite her body experiencing severe pain. Several parents had to send her to the hospital. The doctor diagnosed her with choledochal gallbladder stones, and immediately carried out the surgery. Just after being discharged from the hospital, she immediately returned to school.
