= List of ambassadors of China to Somalia =

Coordinates: 2.037011°N 45.339782°E

Chinese Ambassador to Somalia
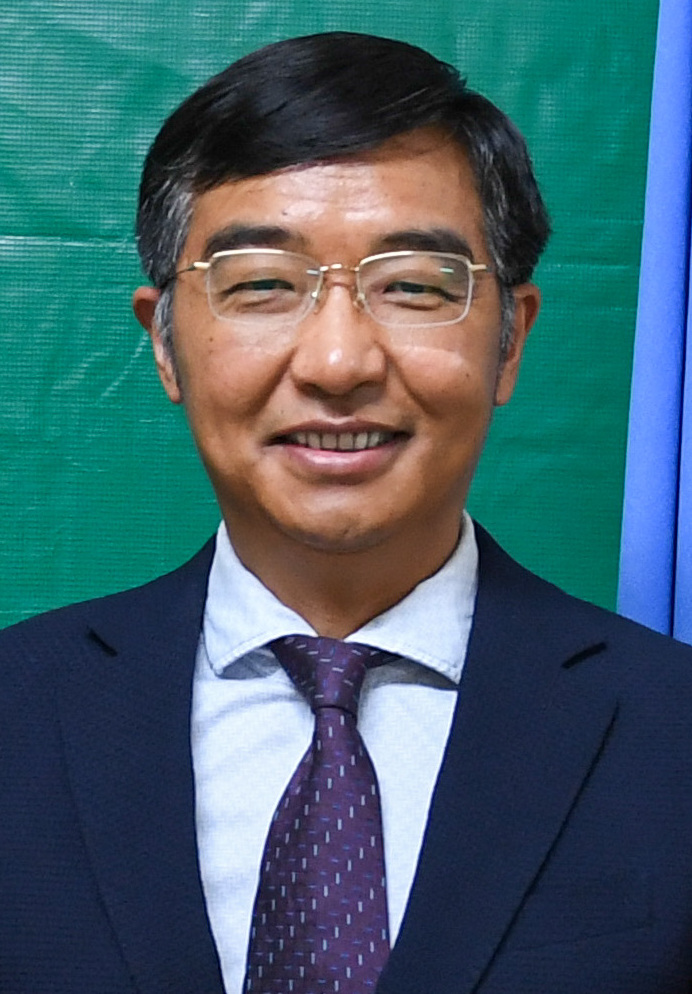
- Incumbent; Fei Shengchao since 5 September 2021
- Inaugural holder: Zhang Yue
- Formation: 1 May 1961; 65 years ago
- Website: http://so.china-embassy.gov.cn/eng/

The Chinese ambassador to Somalia is the official representative of the People's Republic of China to the Federal Republic of Somalia.

== List of representatives ==
Diplomatic agrément/Diplomatic accreditation	Ambassador	Chinese language zh:中国驻索马里大使列表	Observations	Premier of the People's Republic of China	List of prime ministers of Somalia	Term end
December 27, 1960			The governments in Mogadishu and Beijing established diplomatic relations.	Zhou Enlai	Abdirashid Ali Shermarke	
May 1, 1961	Zhang Yue (PRC diplomat)	張越		Zhou Enlai	Abdirashid Ali Shermarke	July 1, 1964
September 1, 1964	Yang Shouzheng	zh:杨守正	(*1915 ): From September 1964 - March 1967 he was ambassador in Somalia.; From April 1970 - April 1974 he was ambassador in Sudan.; From December 1974 - July 1977 he was ambassador in Ethiopia.; From November 1977 - January 1980 he was ambassador in Mozambique.; From April 1980 - January 1985 he was ambassador in Soviet Union	Zhou Enlai	Abdirizak Haji Hussein	March 1, 1970
September 1, 1970	Fan Zuokai	zh:樊作楷	(*November 2, 1918 - October 1, 2004): From September 1970 - January 1975 he was ambassador in Somalia.; From September 1975 - December 197 he was ambassador in Mali.; From March 1983 - January 1986 he was ambassador in Iran.	Zhou Enlai	Siad Barre	January 1, 1975
March 1, 1975	Zhang Shijie (PRC diplomat)	zh:張世傑	From August 1960 - November 1965 he was ambassador in Nepal.; From March 1975 - April 1979 he was ambassador in Somalia.	Zhou Enlai	Siad Barre	April 1, 1979
October 1, 1979	Li Yuchi	李玉池		Hua Guofeng	Siad Barre	February 1, 1983
September 1, 1983	Wang Shikun	王世琨		Zhao Ziyang	Siad Barre	October 1, 1985
January 1, 1986	Shi Chengxun	施承训		Zhao Ziyang	Siad Barre	March 1, 1990
April 1, 1990	Xu Yingjie	zh:徐英杰	From April 1990 - April 1992 he was ambassador in Somalia.; From March 1992 - July 1995 he was ambassador in Uganda.	Li Peng	Mohammed Hawadle Madar	April 1, 1992
October 1, 2014	en:Wei Hongtian	韦宏添		Li Keqiang	Abdiweli Sheikh Ahmed	March 1, 2017
March 1, 2017	Qin Jian	覃俭		Li Keqiang	Hassan Ali Khaire	September 5, 2021
September 5, 2021	Fei Shengchao	费胜潮		Li Keqiang	Mohamed Hussein Roble	

== See also ==
- China–Somalia relations
