= Honggutan, Nanchang =

Coordinates: 28°42′14″N 115°51′53″E

Honggutan District 红谷滩区
- District
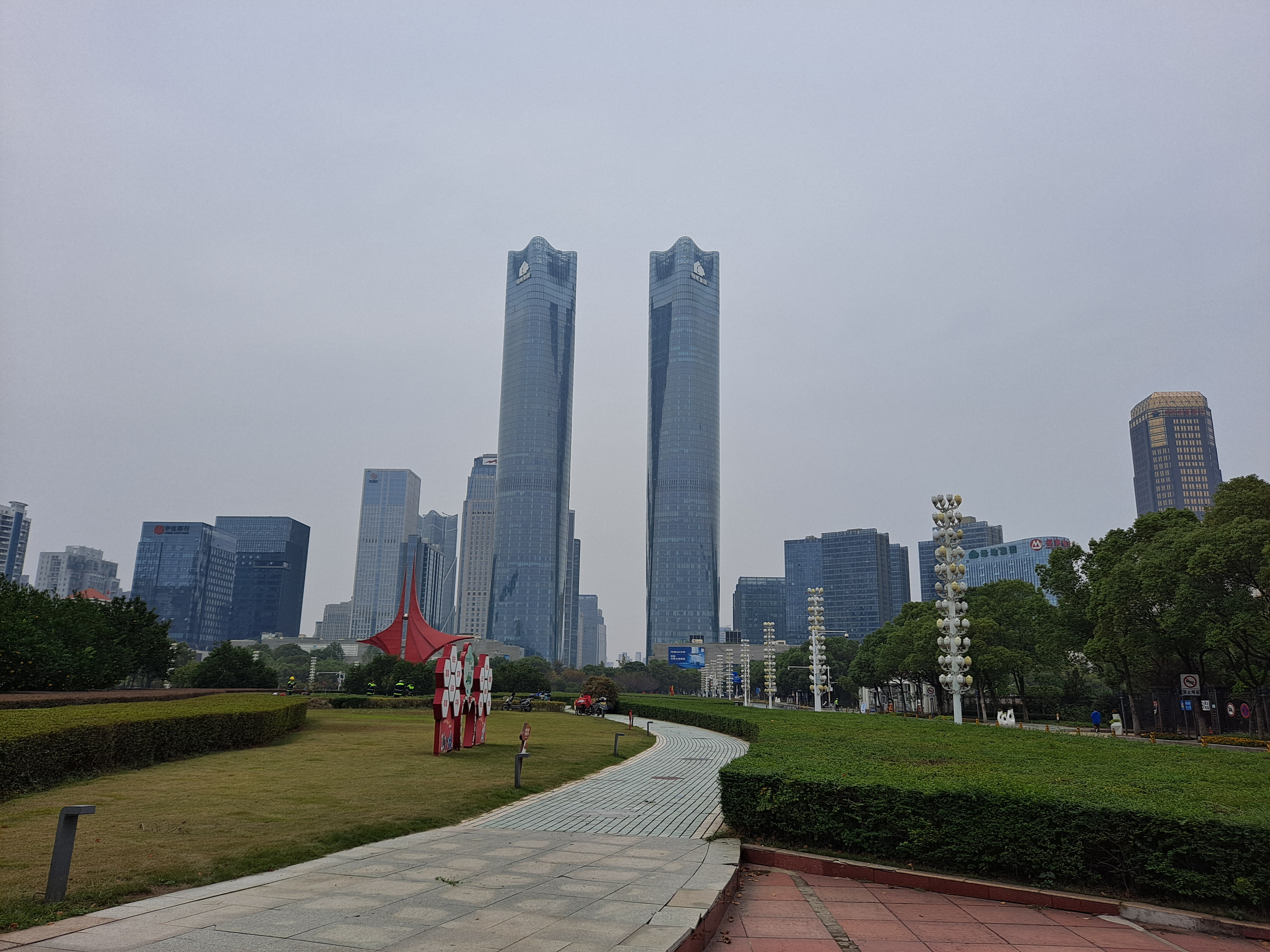
- Honggutan Administrative Square

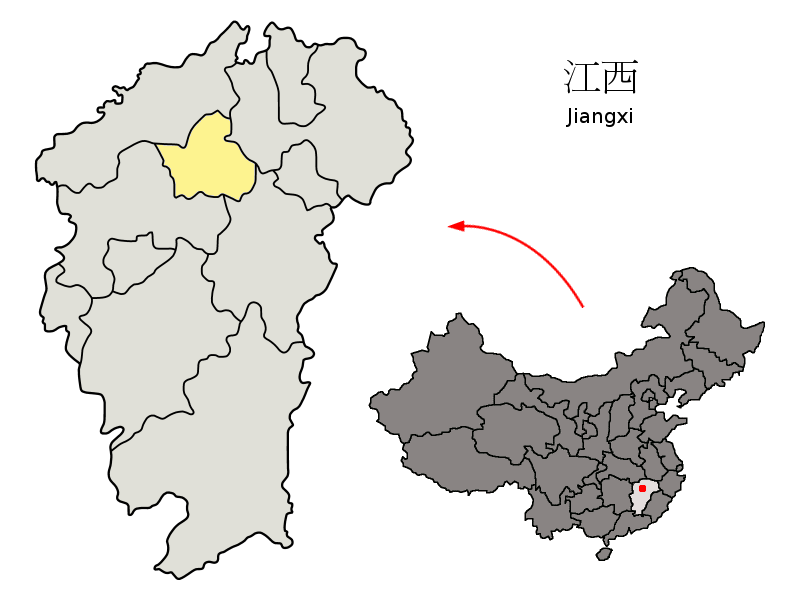
- Location of Nanchang
- Country: People's Republic of China
- Province: Jiangxi
- Prefecture-level city: Nanchang

Area
  - Total: 175 km^{2} (68 sq mi)

Population (2019)
  - Total: 600,000
  - Density: 3,400/km^{2} (8,900/sq mi)
- Time zone: UTC+8 (China Standard)
- Postal Code: 330038
- Website: hgt.nc.gov.cn

Honggutan, Nanchang
- Simplified Chinese: 红谷滩
- Traditional Chinese: 紅谷灘
Transcriptions
Standard Mandarin
- Hanyu Pinyin: Hónggǔtān

Honggutan District (Chinese: 红谷滩区; pinyin: Hónggǔtān qū) is a district and the municipal seat of Nanchang, the capital of Jiangxi Province, China. It covers over 175 square kilometers and had a population of 600,000.

== Administrative divisions ==
Honggutan District is divided into 2 subdistricts, 1 town and 3 management offices:

2 subdistricts

- Shajing (沙井街道)
- Weidong (卫东街道)

1 town

- Shengmi (生米镇)

3 management offices

- Fenghuang Zhou (凤凰洲管理处)
- Hongjue Zhou (红角洲管理处)
- Jiulong Hu (九龙湖管理处)

== Metro ==
- 1 Line 1 - Changjiang Road, Zhujiang Road, South Lushan Avenue, Lüyin Road, Weidong, 2Metro Central, Qiushui Square
- 2 Line 2 - 1Metro Central, Cuiyuan Road, 5Xuefu Avenue East, Qianhu Avenue, Lingbei, Wolongshan, International Sports Center, Longgang, Nanchang West RS, South Square of West RS, International Expo Center, Yingtan Street, Civic Center, Jiulong Lake South, Shengmi, Dagang, Nanlu
- 5 Line 5
