= Lai Qirui =

Chinese footballer

Personal information
- Date of birth: 18 January 1998 (age 28)
- Place of birth: Chongqing, China
- Height: 1.80 m (5 ft 11 in)
- Position: Midfielder

Team information
- Current team: Chongqing Rich

Youth career
- Chengdu FA

Senior career*
Years	Team	Apps	(Gls)
2018–2019	Sinđelić Beograd	3	(0)
2021–2023	Urad Middle Banner Hasar		
2023–	Chongqing Rich		
- * Club domestic league appearances and goals as of 16:41, 25 April 2023 (UTC)

Lai Qirui (simplified Chinese: 赖奇睿; traditional Chinese: 賴奇睿; pinyin: Lài Qíruì; born 18 January 1998) is a Chinese footballer currently playing as a midfielder for Chongqing Rich.

== Club career ==
Born in Chongqing, Lai moved to Chengdu as a child, where he joined the Chengdu provincial team, and would be a ball boy for the Chengdu Blades. In May 2012, he went on trial with German side Bayern Munich. He won the 'best athlete' award at the 2012 Chengdu School Football Tournament in December of the same year, representing the Chengdu Foreign Languages School. The following year, he went on trial with French team Metz, alongside Chengdu FA teammate Li Shanglin.

Lai moved to Serbia for the 2018–19 season, joining second division side Sinđelić Beograd. He made four appearances in all competitions, before leaving the club at the end of the season. He returned to China, and in 2021 joined Urad Middle Banner Hasar in the Chinese Champions League, the fourth tier of Chinese football.

== Career statistics ==
=== Club ===
As of 31 December 2019.

Appearances and goals by club, season and competition
Club	Season	League			Cup		Other		Total	
Club	Season	Division	Apps	Goals	Apps	Goals	Apps	Goals	Apps	Goals
Sinđelić Beograd	2018–19	Serbian First League	3	0	1 (Note: Appearances in the Serbian Cup)	0	0	0	4	0
Career total			3	0	1	0	0	0	4	0
