= Changchun Foreign Languages School =

- 长春外国语学校
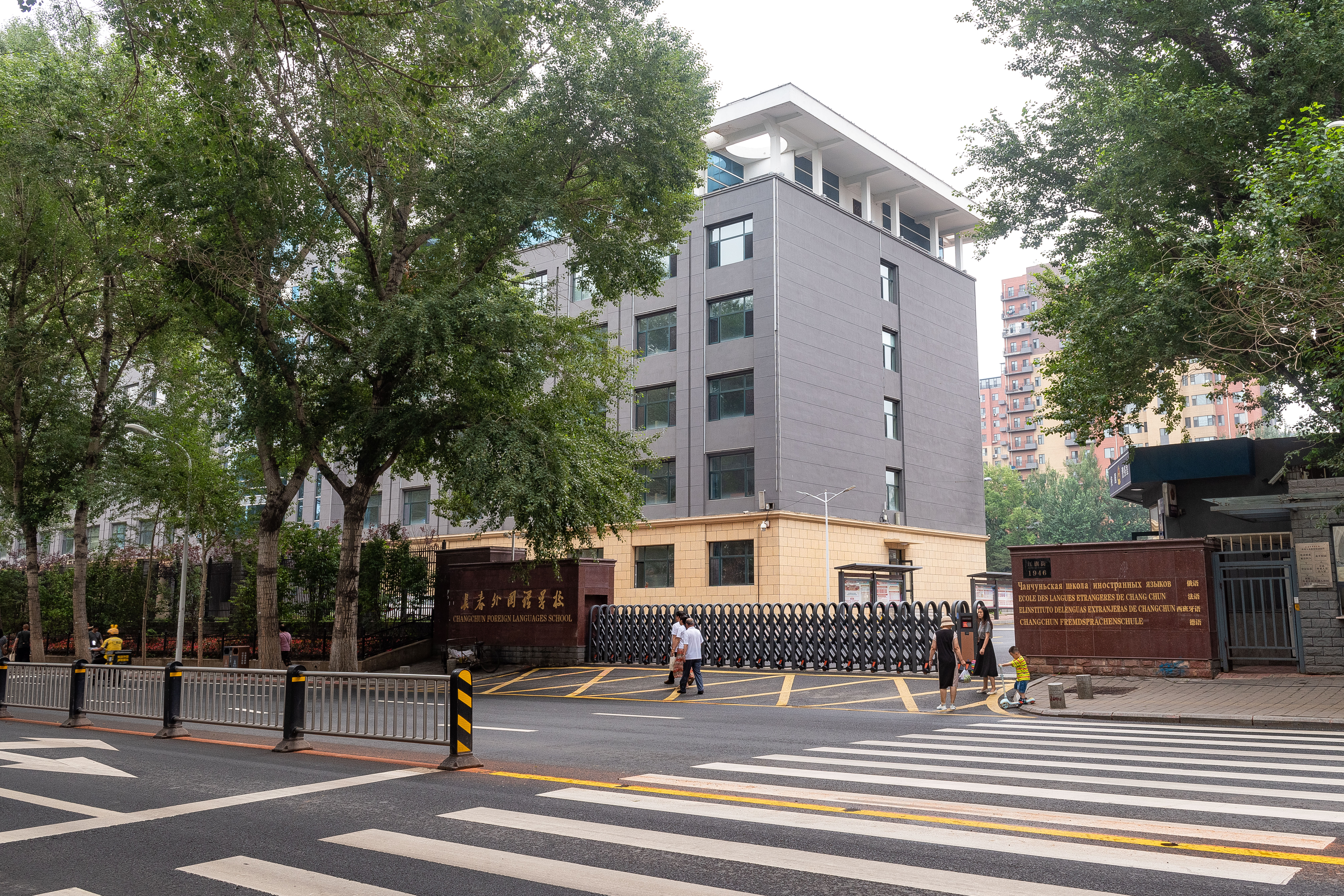

Location
- No. 1946, Hongqi Street, Changchun, Jilin, China

Information
- Type: public
- Motto: 民族精神，国际视野 (National Spirit, International Vision)
- Established: 1963
- Principal: Wang Hao
- Student Union/Association: the Students' Union of Changchun Foreign Languages School
- Affiliation: The Education Department of Jilin Province
- secretary of school's branch of CPC: Huang Baoguo
- Website: www.ccfls.cn

Changchun Foreign Languages School (Chinese: 长春外国语学校) is a public secondary school in Changchun, Jilin, China. The school was founded in 1963 and is managed by the Jilin Provincial Education Department.

== See also ==
- List of foreign-language schools in China
