= Nanchang =

Capital of Jiangxi, China

Nanchang 南昌市
- Prefecture-level city
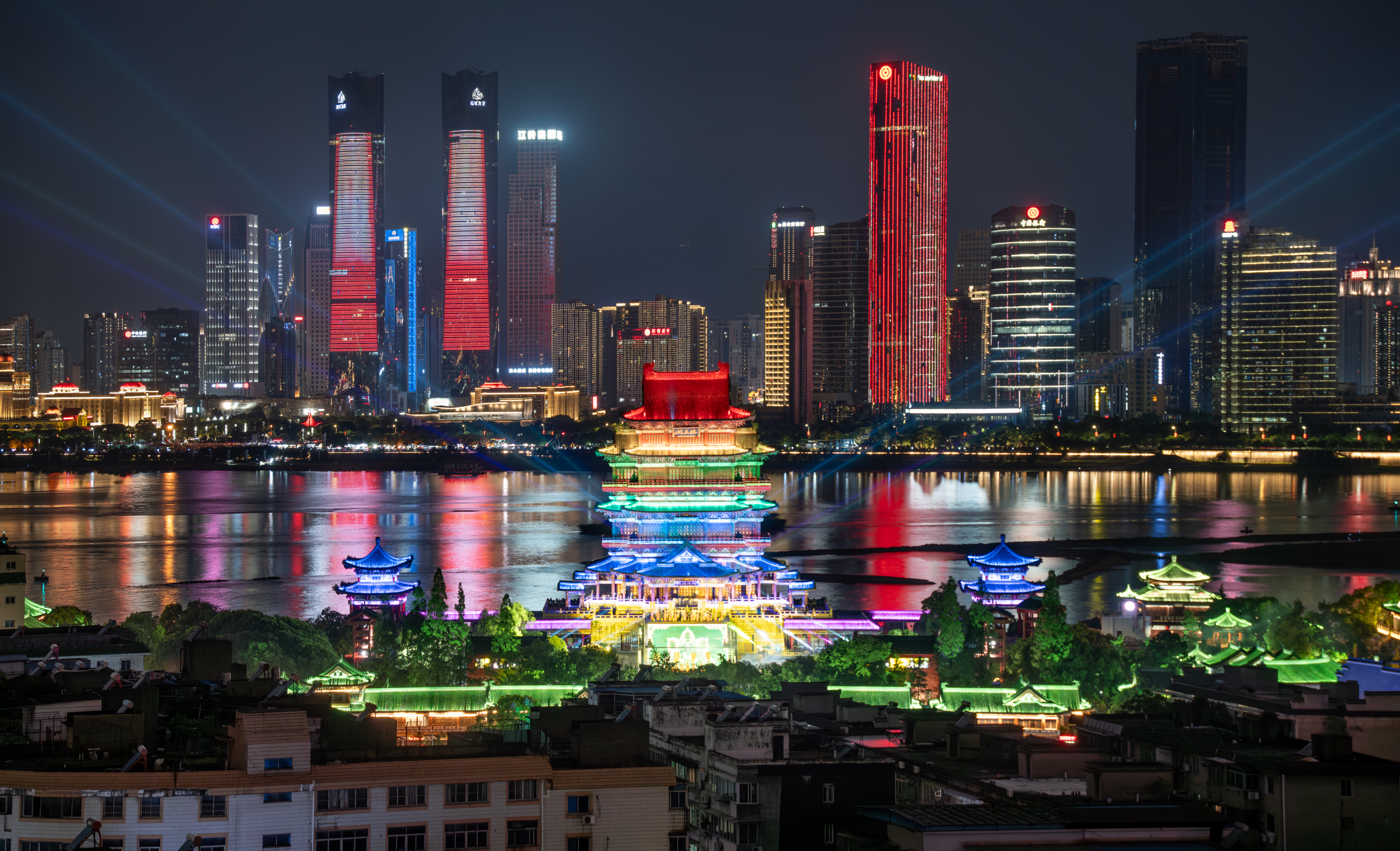
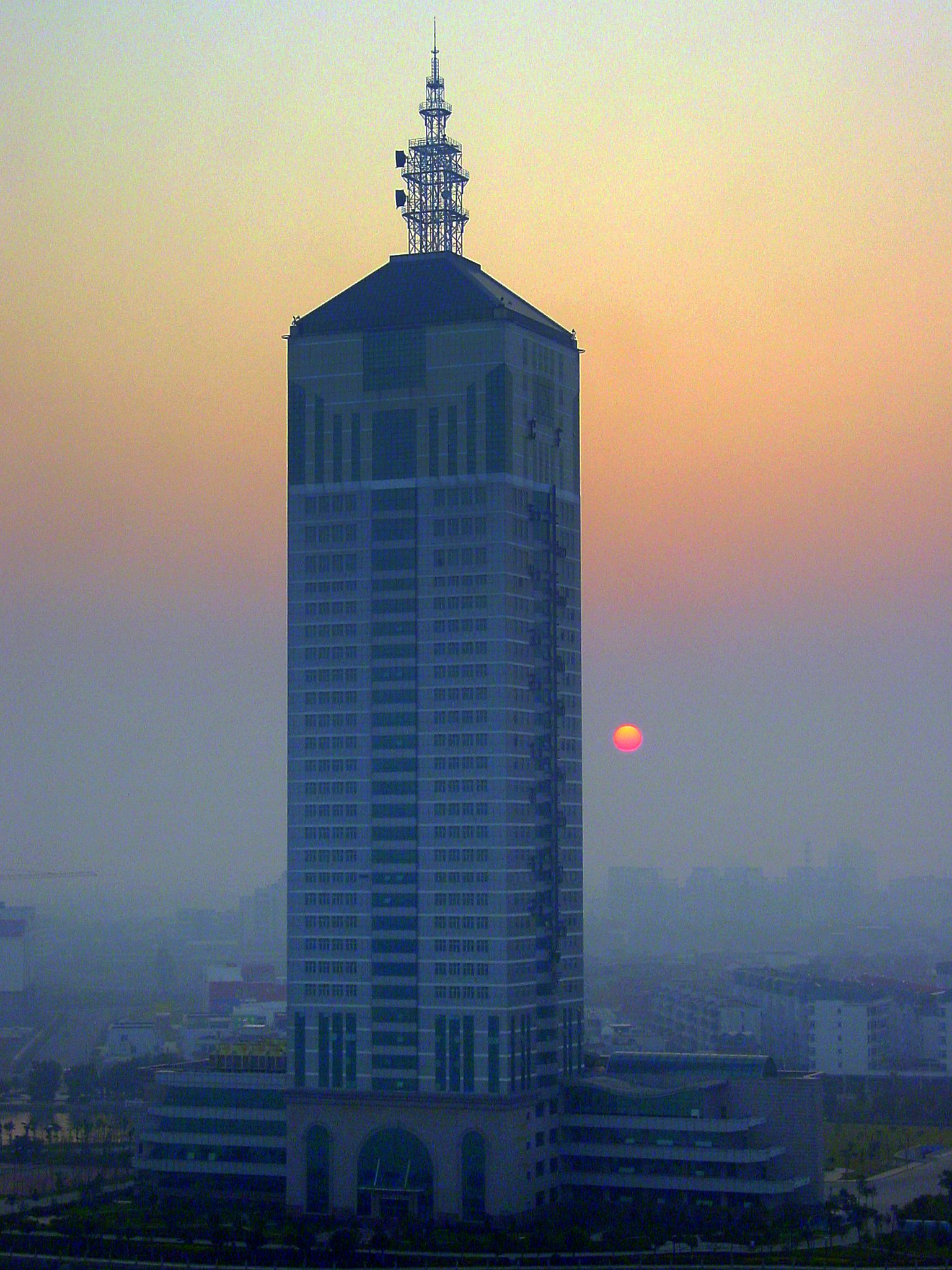
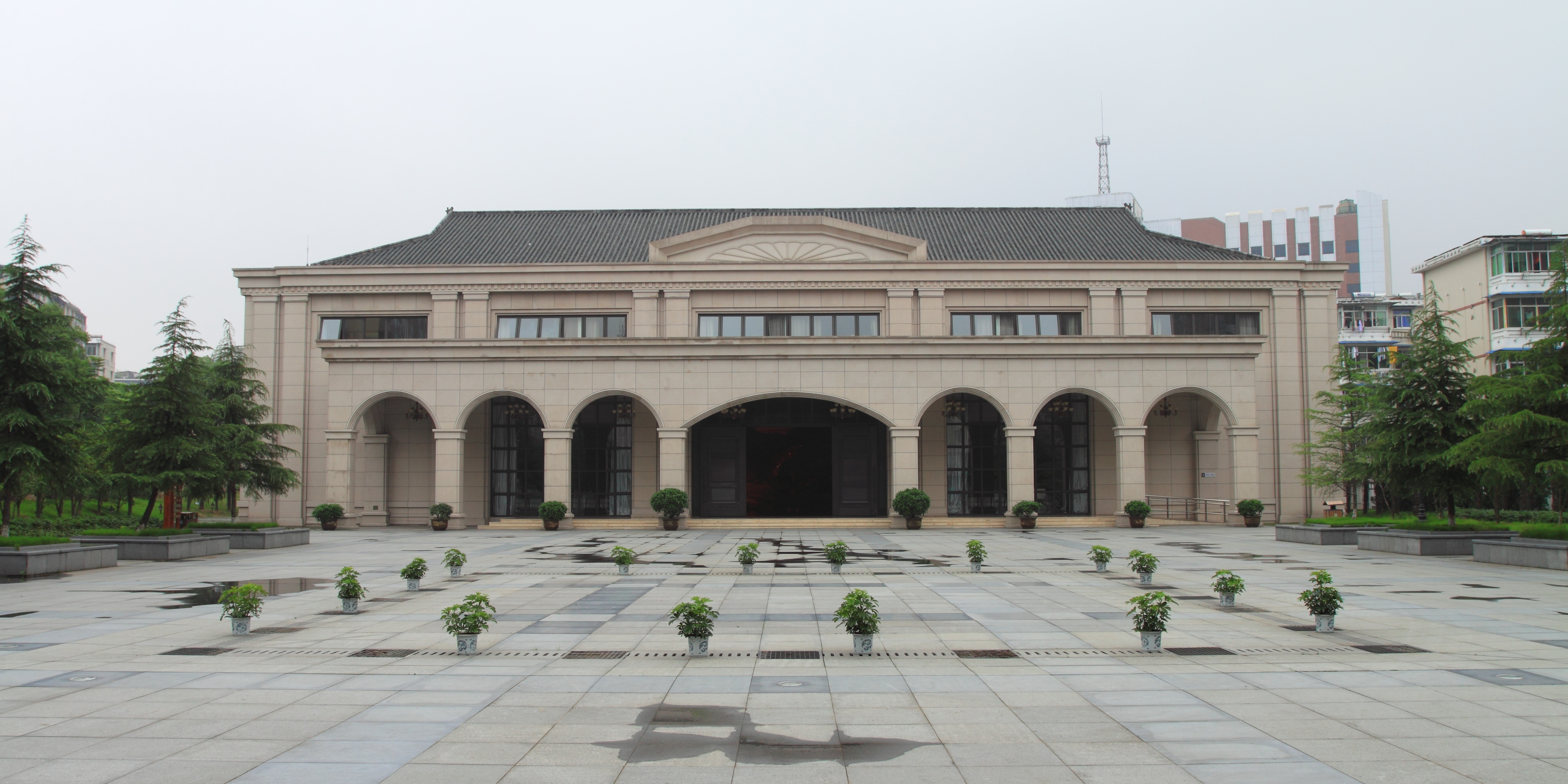
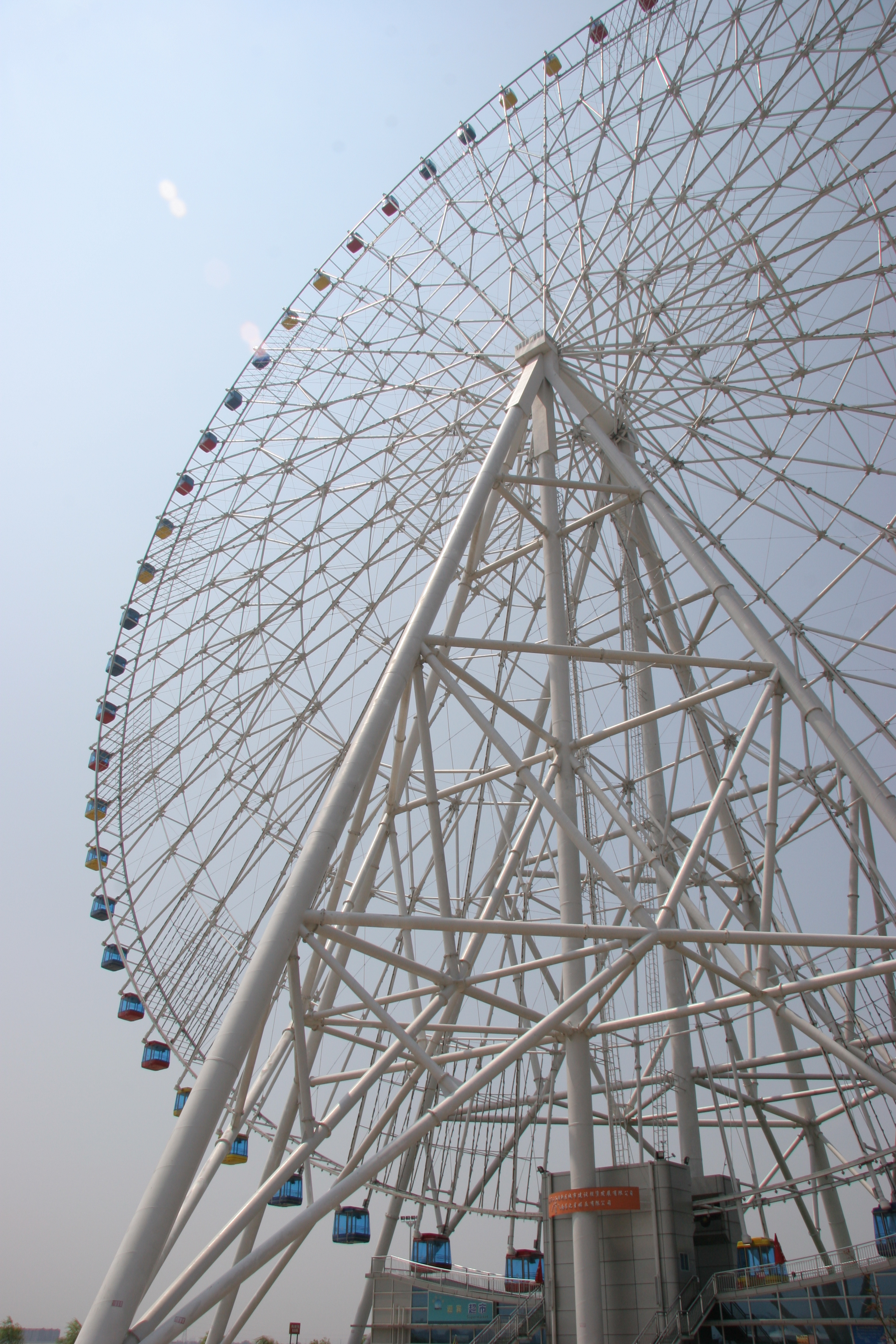
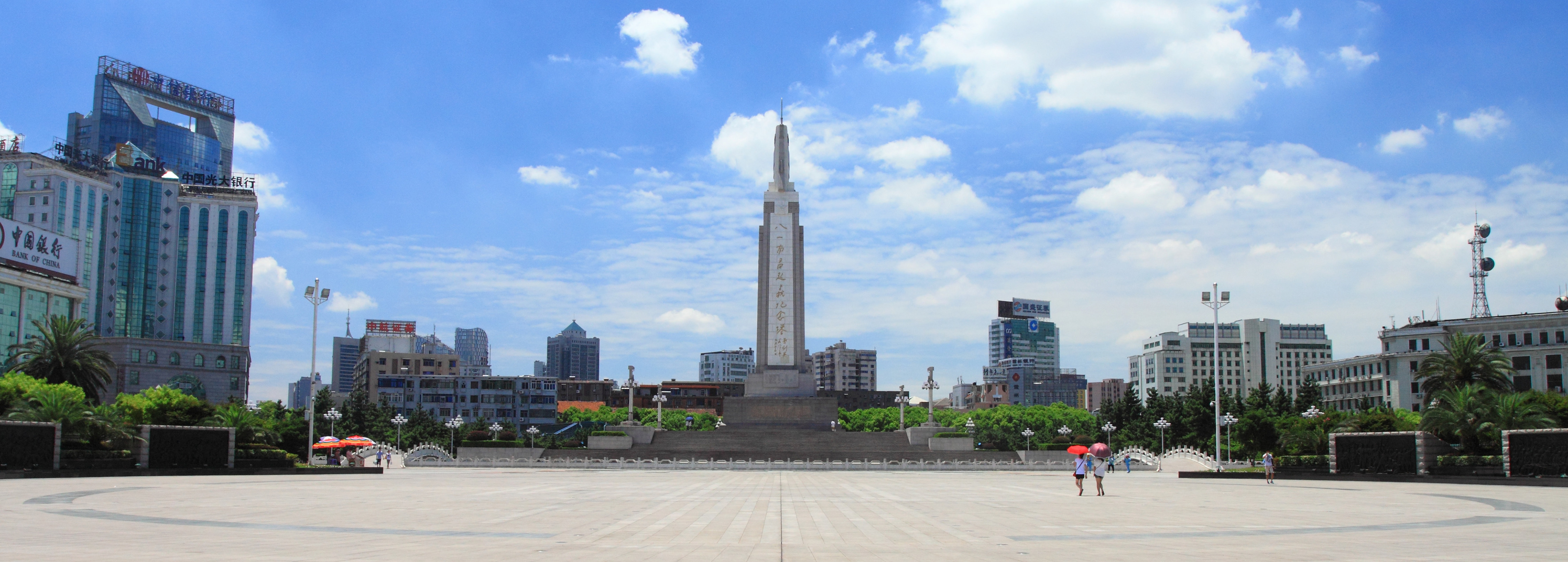
- Nanchang Skyline, with the Pavilion of Prince Teng in the front Sunrise in Nanchang New Fourth Army Headquarters Star of Nanchang Bayi Square
- Nicknames: Hongcheng (洪城 lit. Grand City), Hongdu (洪都 lit. Grand Metropolis), Yuzhang (豫章)
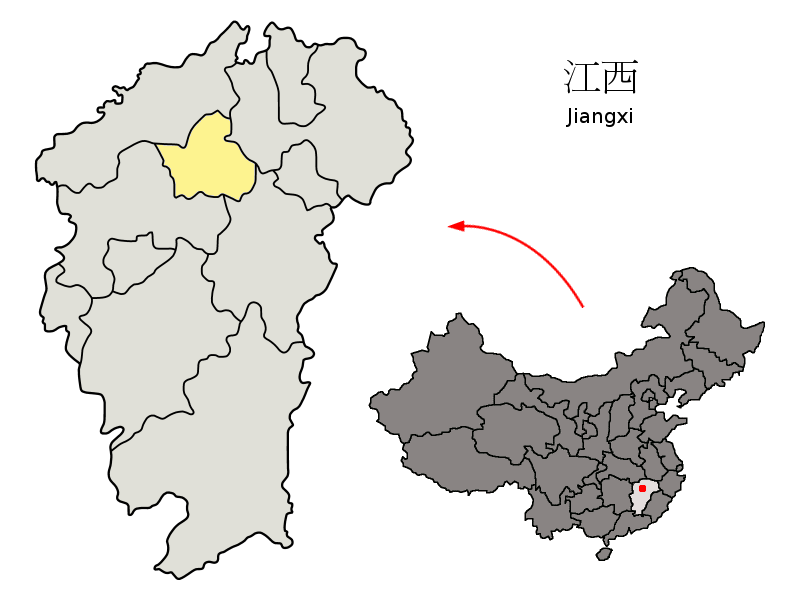
- Location of Nanchang City jurisdiction in Jiangxi

- Location in eastern China Nanchang (China)
- Coordinates (Nanchang municipal government): 28°40′59″N 115°51′29″E
- Country: China
- Province: Jiangxi
- County-level divisions: 6 districts, 3 counties
- Municipal seat: Honggutan District

Government
  - Type: Prefecture-level city
  - Body: Nanchang Municipal People's Congress
  - CCP Secretary: Sheng Qiuping
  - Congress Chairman: Li Zhenfa
  - Mayor: Gao Shiwen
  - CPPCC Chairman: Wang Aidong

Area
  - Prefecture-level city: 7,194 km^{2} (2,778 sq mi)
  - Urban: 686 km^{2} (265 sq mi)
  - Metro: 4,588 km^{2} (1,771 sq mi)
- Elevation: 37 m (121 ft)

Population (2020 census)
  - Prefecture-level city: 6,255,007
  - Density: 869.5/km^{2} (2,252/sq mi)
  - Urban: 3,929,660
  - Urban density: 5,730/km^{2} (14,800/sq mi)
  - Metro: 5,382,162
  - Metro density: 1,173/km^{2} (3,038/sq mi)

GDP (2024)
  - Prefecture-level city: CN¥ 780.04 billion US$ 109.53 billion
  - Per capita: CN¥ 117,843; US$ 16,547
- Time zone: UTC+8 (CST)
- Postal code: 330000
- ISO 3166 code: CN-JX-01
- Licence plate prefixes: 赣A, 赣M
- City flower: Chinese rose
- City tree: Camphor laurel
- Website: nc.gov.cn

Nanchang
- "Nanchang" in Chinese characters
- Chinese: 南昌
- Literal meaning: "Southern Prosperity"
Transcriptions
Standard Mandarin
- Hanyu Pinyin: Nánchāng
- Wade–Giles: Nan^{2}-ch'ang^{1}
- IPA: [nǎn.ʈʂʰáŋ]
Wu
- Suzhounese: Noe^{2}-tshaon^{1}
Yue: Cantonese
- Yale Romanization: Nàahm-chēung
- Jyutping: Naam^{4}-coeng^{1}
- IPA: [nam˩.tsʰœŋ˥]
Southern Min
- Hokkien POJ: Lâm-chhiong
- Tâi-lô: Lâm-tshiong

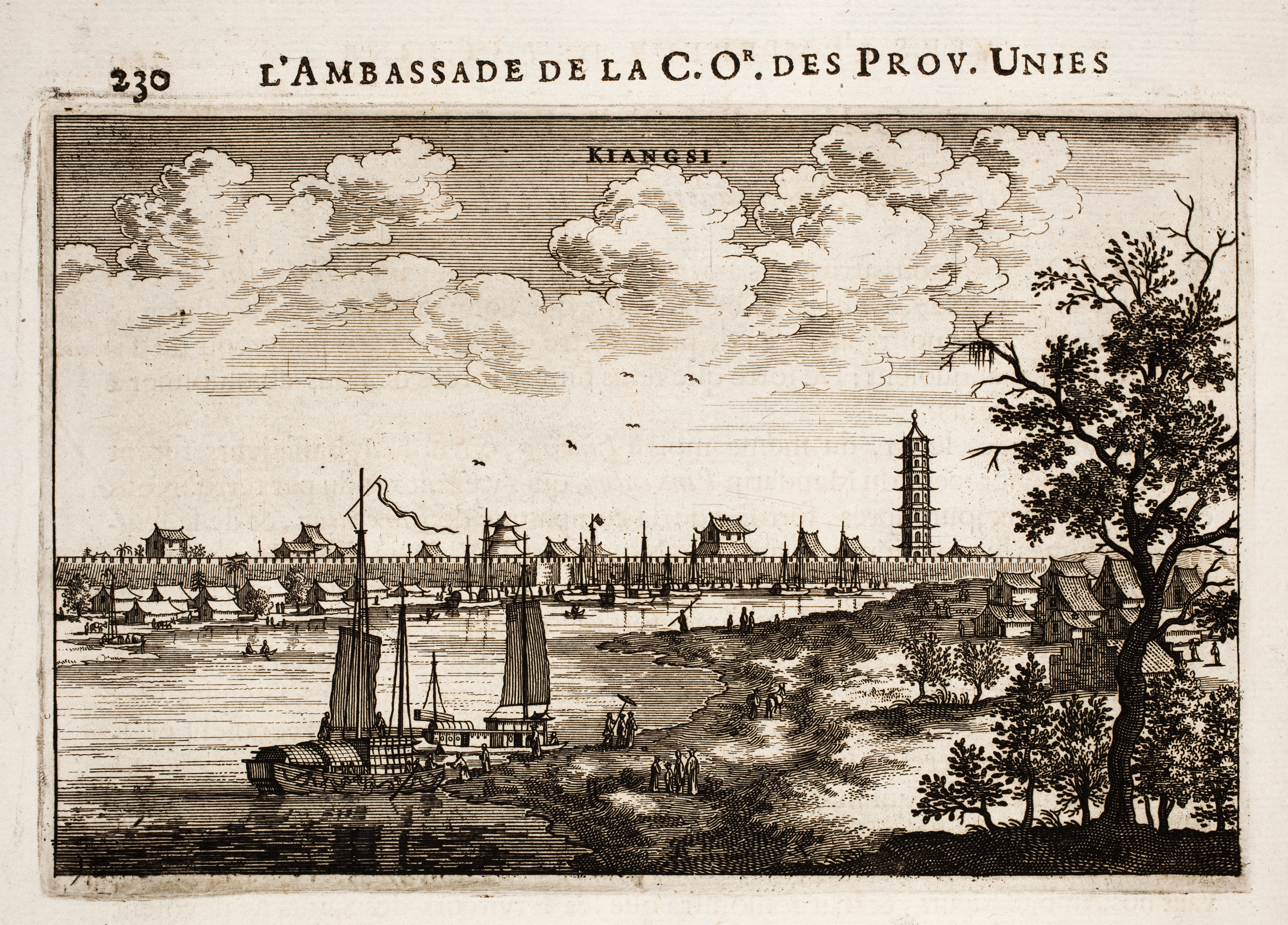
"Kiangsi" (Nanchang). Nieuhof: L'ambassade de la Compagnie Orientale des Provinces Unies vers l'Empereur de la Chine, 1665

Nanchang (Note: UK: /nænˈtʃæŋ/, US: /nɑːnˈtʃɒŋ/; Chinese: 南昌; pinyin: Nánchāng pronunciation: [nǎnʈʂʰáŋ]) is the capital of Jiangxi, China. Located in the north-central part of the province and in the hinterland of Poyang Lake Plain, it is bounded on the west by the Jiuling Mountains, and on the east by Poyang Lake. Because of its strategic location connecting the prosperous East and South China, it has become a major railway hub in Southern China in recent decades.

As the Nanchang Uprising in 1927 is distinctively recognized by the ruling Communist Party as "firing the first gunshot against the Nationalists", the current government has therefore named the city since 1949 "the place where the People's Liberation Army was born", and the most widely known "place where the military banner of the People's Liberation Army was first raised".

Nanchang is also a major city, appearing among the top 100 cities in the world by scientific research outputs, as tracked by the Nature Index and home to Nanchang University.

== History ==
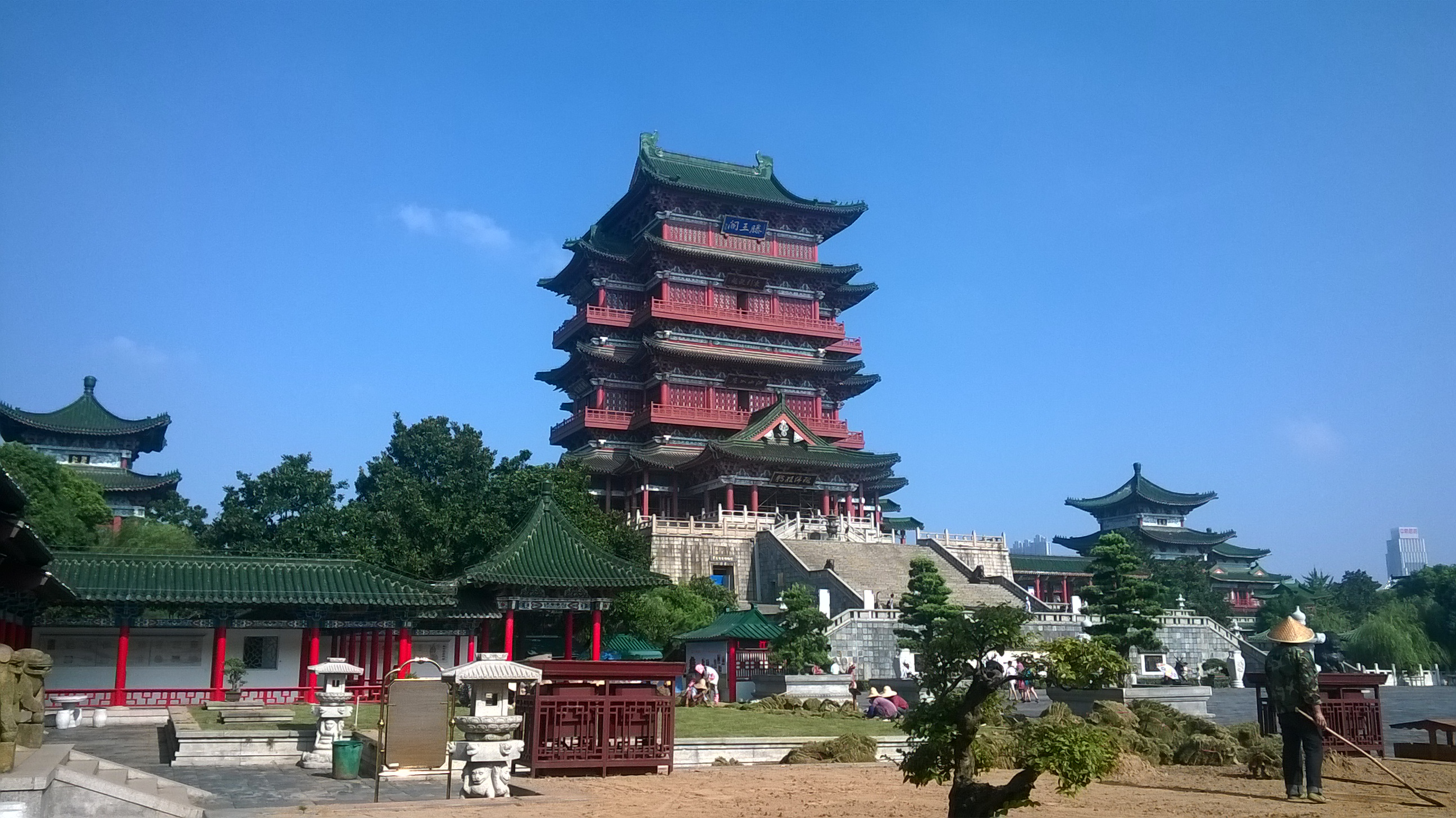
Tengwang Pavilion

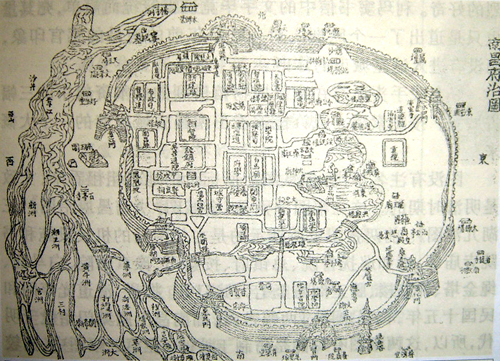
Historical map of Nanchang

=== Imperial era ===
The territories encompassing modern-day Jiangxi Province—including Nanchang—was first incorporated into China during the Qin dynasty, when it was conquered from the Baiyue peoples and organized as Jiujiang Commandery (Chinese: 九江郡). In 201 BC, during the Han dynasty, the city was given the Chinese name Nanchang and became the administrative seat of Yuzhang Commandery (豫章郡), and was governed by Guan Ying, one of Emperor Gaozu of Han's generals. The name Nanchang means "southern flourishing", derived from a motto of developing what is now southern China that is traditionally attributed to Emperor Gaozu himself.

In AD 589, during the Sui dynasty, this commandery was changed into a prefecture named Hongzhou (洪州), and after 763 it became the provincial center of Jiangxi, which was then beginning the rapid growth that by the 12th century made it the most populous province in China.

In 653 the Tengwang Pavilion was constructed, and in 675 Wang Bo wrote the classic "Tengwang Ge Xu", a poetic introductory masterpiece celebrating the building, making the building, the city, and the author himself known to literate Chinese-speaking population ever since. The Pavilion has been destroyed and rebuilt several times throughout history. Its present form was reconstructed in the 1980s after being destroyed in 1929 during the Chinese Civil War.

In 959, under the Southern Tang regime, Nanchang was made superior prefecture and the southern capital. After the conquest by the Song regime in 981 it was reverted to the name Hongzhou. In 1164 it was renamed Longxing prefecture, which name it retained until 1368. During the Yuan dynasty it was the capital of Jiangxi Province, an area that included Guangdong as well. At the end of the Yuan (Mongol) period (1279–1368), it became a battleground between Zhu Yuanzhang, the founder of the Ming dynasty (1368–1644), and the rival local warlord, Chen Youliang. At the beginning of the 16th century, it was the power base from which Zhu Chenhao, the Prince of Ning, launched a rebellion against the emperor.

During the Yuan Dynasty, it might have been the centre of porcelain trade.

During the reign of the Wanli Emperor of the Ming dynasty, it housed relatives of the emperor who had been exiled because they were potential claimants of the imperial throne, members of the imperial family constituting about one quarter of the city's population; as a result of this, Matteo Ricci came here when trying to gain entry to Beijing.

In the 1850s it suffered considerably as a result of the Taiping Rebellion (1850–64), and its importance as a commercial centre declined as the overland routes to Canton were replaced by coastal steamship services in the latter half of the 19th century. Nanchang has, however, remained the undisputed regional metropolis of Jiangxi.

=== Republican era ===
On August 1, 1927, Nanchang was the site of one of a series of insurrections organized by the communists. The Nanchang Uprising, led by pro-communist Kuomintang officers under Soviet direction, succeeded in holding the city for only a few days, and provided a core of troops and a method of organization from which the People's Liberation Army (PLA) later developed.

In 1939, the Battle of Nanchang, a ferocious battle between the Chinese National Revolutionary Army and the Imperial Japan Army in the Second Sino-Japanese War took place. After the Battle of Wuhan, the Chinese National Revolutionary Army took control of the Nanchang-Jiujiang railway. This action successfully stopped the Imperial Japan Army and blocked them in the north of Xiushui. On March 17, 1939, the 38th year of the Republic, the Imperial Japanese Army launched its brutal attack on the city of Nanchang. With the Chinese National Revolutionary Army's fightback, the Battle of Nanchang commenced. Overall, the Battle of Nanchang led to more than 80,000 Chinese National Revolutionary Army soldiers being wounded or killed, and the Imperial Japan Army has more than 20,000 casualties.

=== People's Republic era ===
By 1949, Nanchang was still essentially an old-style administrative and commercial city, with little industry apart from food processing; it had a population of about 275,000. Nanchang first acquired a rail connection in 1915, only connecting to the port city of Jiujiang by the Yangtze. Several other rail links have since been opened. After World War II a line was completed to Linchuan and Gongqi in the Ru River Valley to the south-southeast.

Since 1949, Nanchang has been extensively industrialized. It is now a large-scale producer of cotton textiles and cotton yarn. Paper making is also a major industry, as is food processing (especially rice milling). Heavy industry began to gain prominence in the mid-1950s. A large thermal-power plant was installed and uses coal brought by rail from Fengcheng to the south. A machinery industry also grew up, at first mainly concentrating on the production of agricultural equipment and diesel engines. Nanchang then became a minor centre of the automotive industry in China, producing trucks and tractors and also accessories such as tires. An iron-smelting plant helping to supply local industry was installed in the later 1950s. There is also a large chemical industry, producing agricultural chemicals and insecticides as well as pharmaceuticals.

== Geography ==
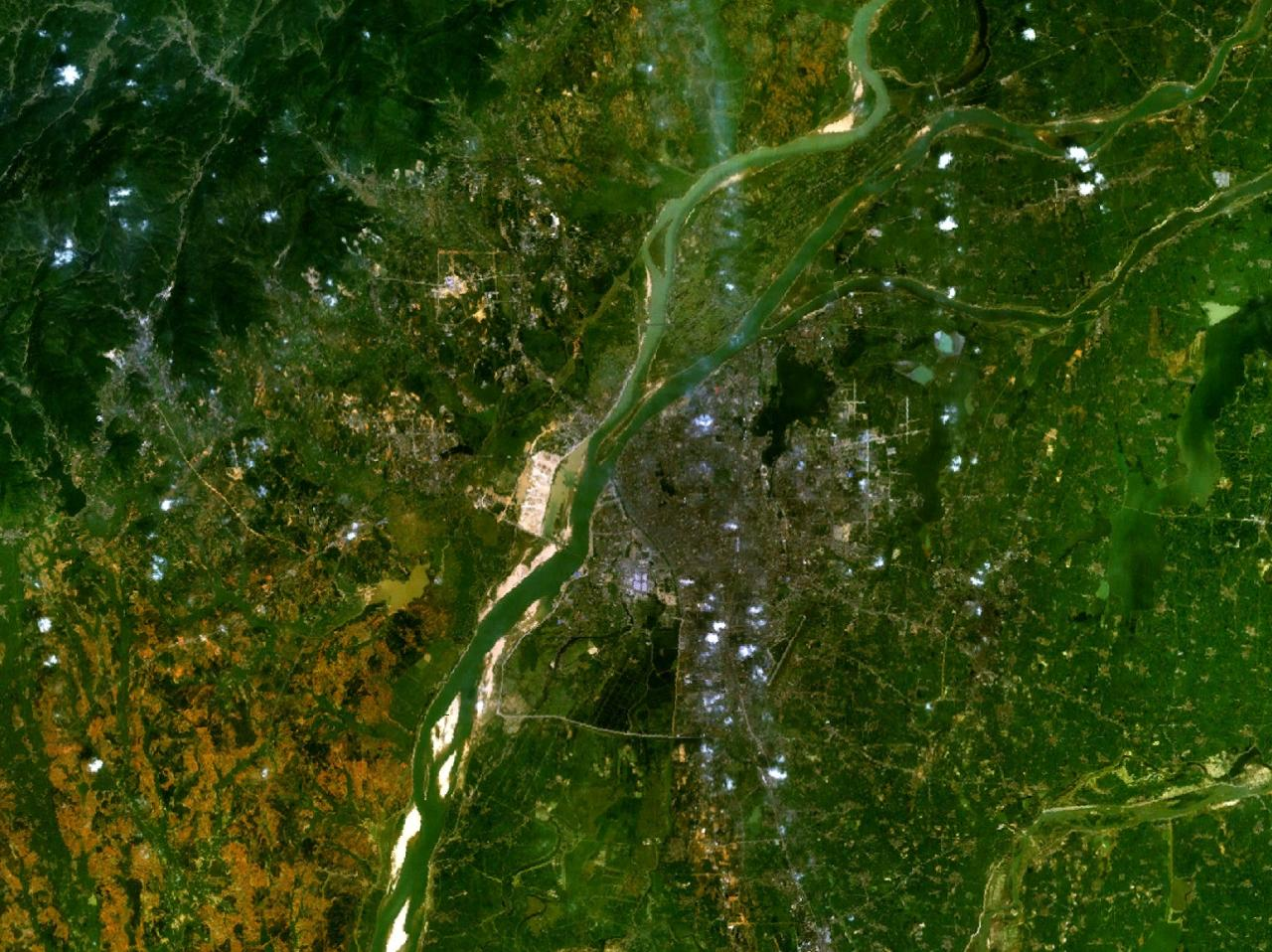
Nanchang Satellite imagery 2005

Nanchang is located in inland southeastern China, 130 km (81 mi) south of the Yangtze River and is situated on the right bank of the Gan River just below its confluence with the Jin River and some 40 km (25 mi) southwest of its discharge into Poyang Lake.

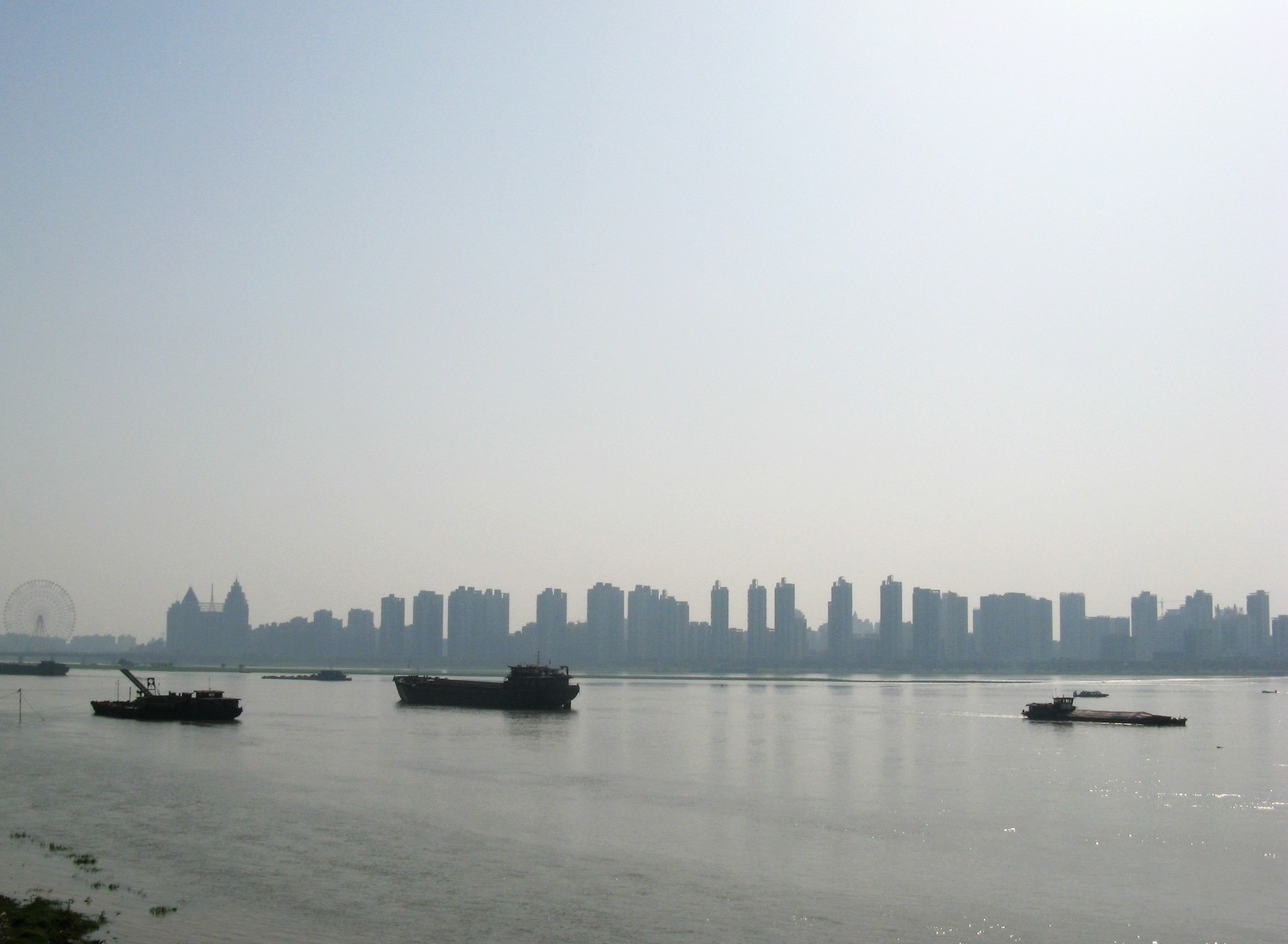
Gan River

=== Climate ===
Nanchang has a humid subtropical climate (Köppen Cfa) with four distinct seasons. Winters are short and cool with occasional frosts; it begins somewhat sunny and dry but becomes progressively wetter and more overcast. Spring begins especially gloomy, and from April to June, each month has more than 220 mm (8.7 in) of rainfall. Summer is long and humid, with amongst the highest temperatures of any Chinese provincial capital, and with the sun shining close to 60 percent of the time in July and August, is the sunniest time of year. Autumn is warm to mild with the lowest rainfall levels of the year. The monthly 24-hour average temperature ranges from 5.9 °C (42.6 °F) in January to 29.6 °C (85.3 °F) in July, while the annual mean is 18.5 °C (65.3 °F). Annual precipitation stands at around 1,704 mm (67 in); with monthly percent possible sunshine ranging from 27 percent in March to 56 percent in August, the city receives 1,809 hours of sunshine annually in average. Extremes since 1951 have ranged from −9.7 °C (15 °F) on 29 December 1991 to 40.6 °C (105 °F) on 23 July 1961.

Climate data for Nanchang, elevation 47 m (154 ft), (1991–2020 normals, extremes 1951–present)
Month	Jan	Feb	Mar	Apr	May	Jun	Jul	Aug	Sep	Oct	Nov	Dec	Year
Record high °C (°F)	25.3 (77.5)	28.7 (83.7)	33.3 (91.9)	34.6 (94.3)	36.5 (97.7)	37.7 (99.9)	40.6 (105.1)	39.7 (103.5)	38.7 (101.7)	38.6 (101.5)	32.3 (90.1)	26.1 (79.0)	40.6 (105.1)
Mean daily maximum °C (°F)	9.2 (48.6)	12.1 (53.8)	16.1 (61.0)	22.6 (72.7)	27.3 (81.1)	29.9 (85.8)	33.7 (92.7)	33.3 (91.9)	29.6 (85.3)	24.6 (76.3)	18.3 (64.9)	11.9 (53.4)	22.4 (72.3)
Daily mean °C (°F)	5.9 (42.6)	8.4 (47.1)	12.2 (54.0)	18.4 (65.1)	23.3 (73.9)	26.2 (79.2)	29.6 (85.3)	29.2 (84.6)	25.6 (78.1)	20.3 (68.5)	14.2 (57.6)	8.2 (46.8)	18.5 (65.2)
Mean daily minimum °C (°F)	3.5 (38.3)	5.7 (42.3)	9.4 (48.9)	15.1 (59.2)	20.0 (68.0)	23.3 (73.9)	26.4 (79.5)	26.2 (79.2)	22.6 (72.7)	17.2 (63.0)	11.1 (52.0)	5.4 (41.7)	15.5 (59.9)
Record low °C (°F)	−7.7 (18.1)	−9.3 (15.3)	−1.7 (28.9)	2.4 (36.3)	10.0 (50.0)	14.8 (58.6)	18.9 (66.0)	19.5 (67.1)	13.3 (55.9)	3.5 (38.3)	−0.8 (30.6)	−9.7 (14.5)	−9.7 (14.5)
Average precipitation mm (inches)	83.6 (3.29)	95.3 (3.75)	191.5 (7.54)	213.0 (8.39)	218.4 (8.60)	341.6 (13.45)	176.3 (6.94)	120.0 (4.72)	65.3 (2.57)	49.8 (1.96)	92.4 (3.64)	56.3 (2.22)	1,703.5 (67.07)
Average precipitation days (≥ 0.1 mm)	12.9	12.8	17.3	16.5	15.6	16.1	11.0	10.5	6.6	6.7	9.5	9.5	145
Average snowy days	3.0	1.8	0.6	0	0	0	0	0	0	0	0	1.0	6.4
Average relative humidity (%)	74	75	78	77	76	81	75	74	73	68	72	70	74
Mean monthly sunshine hours	87.1	90.0	101.1	132.7	155.5	145.3	237.5	227.5	191.0	175.3	138.1	127.8	1,808.9
Percentage possible sunshine	27	28	27	34	37	35	56	56	52	50	43	40	40
Source: China Meteorological Administration

As of the 2020 Chinese census, Nanchang had a population of 6,255,007, of which 5,382,162 lived in built-up (urbanized) area consisting of 6 urban districts plus Nanchang County largely being urbanized. 37 ethnic groups were counted amongst its prefecture divisions while 99.2% are Han chinese. The sex ratio in Nanchang is approximately 109 males to 100 females. The aged group (above 60) counts for 14.97% of the entire population.

== Administration ==
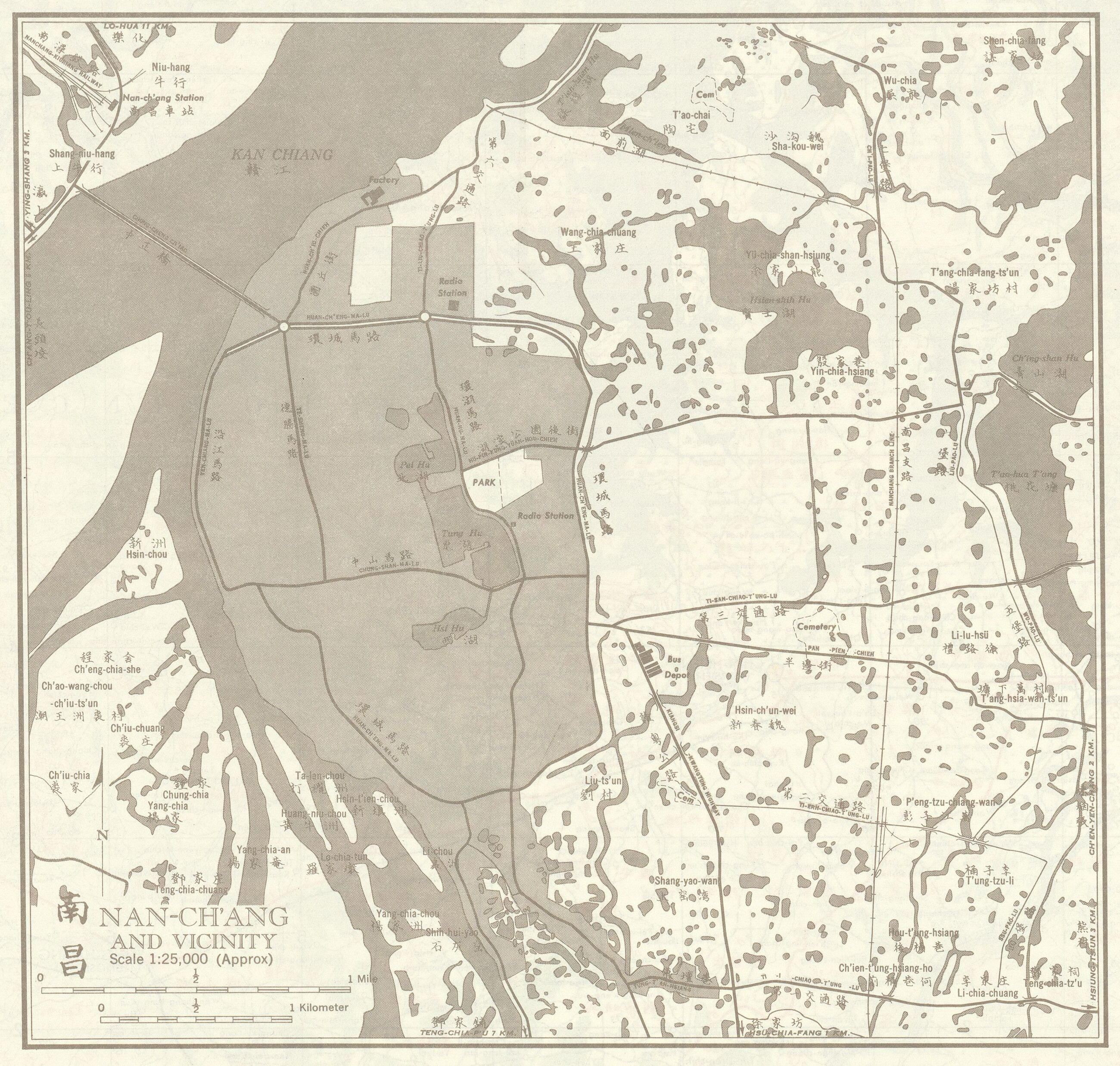
Map of Nanchang (NAN-CH'ANG)

Map
Division code	English	Chinese	Pinyin	Area in km2	Seat	Postal code	Subdivisions				
Division code	English	Chinese	Pinyin	Area in km2	Seat	Postal code	Subdistricts	Towns	Townships	Residential communities	Villages
360100	Nanchang	南昌市	Nánchāng Shì	7194	Honggutan District	330000	32	49	31	625	1161
360102	Donghu District	东湖区	Dōnghú Qū	30	Gongyuan Subdistrict (公园街道)	330000	9			159	21
360103	Xihu District	西湖区	Xīhú Qū	43	Chaoyangzhou Subdistrict (朝阳洲街道)	330000	10	1		136	13
360104	Qingyunpu District	青云谱区	Qīngyúnpǔ Qū	40	Sanjiadian Subdistrict (三家店街道)	330000	5	1		63	12
360111	Qingshanhu District	青山湖区	Qīngshānhú Qū	250	Jingdong (京东镇)	330000	3	6		116	101
360112	Xinjian District	新建区	Xīnjiàn Qū	2160	Changleng (长堎镇)	330100		10	9	39	300
360113	Honggutan District	红谷滩区	Hónggǔtān Qū		Shajing Subdistrict (沙井街道)	330100	2	1			
360121	Nanchang County	南昌县	Nánchāng Xiàn	1811	Liantang (莲塘镇)	330200		11	7	47	311
360123	Anyi County	安义县	Ānyì Xiàn	660	Longjin (龙津镇)	330500		7	3	16	105
360124	Jinxian County	进贤县	Jìnxián Xiàn	1946	Minhe (民和镇)	331700		9	2	37	263

- Honggutan New District (红谷滩新区) is an economic management area and not a formal administrative division.

== Economy ==
Nanchang is a regional hub for agricultural production in Jiangxi province with its grain yield being 16.146 million tons in 2000. Products such as rice and oranges are economic staples. The Ford Motor Company has a plant in Nanchang, assembling the Ford Transit van as part of the Jiangling Motor joint venture. Much of its industry revolves around aircraft manufacturing, automobile manufacturing, metallurgy, electro-mechanics, textile, chemical engineering, traditional Chinese medicine, pharmaceuticals and others. Nanchang has a rapid economic development and ranks 15th among the fastest growing 20 cities in the world. It is one of the cities with the most potential for development in China and the world in the future.

In 2017, the city's gross regional product (GDP) was 500.319 billion yuan (US$80.03 billion), an increase of 9.0% over the previous year. The primary industry's added value was 19.213 billion yuan, an increase of 4.0%; the secondary industry's added value was 266.61 billion yuan, an increase of 8.4%; The added value of the three industries was 214.496 billion yuan, an increase of 10.2%. The per capita GDP of 81,598 yuan was converted to 12,285 US dollars according to the average annual exchange rate. Additionally, the total fiscal revenue for the year was 78.282 billion yuan, an increase of 14.3% over the previous year.

The GDP of Nanchang in 2008 was 166 billion Yuan (US$24.3 billion). The GDP per capita was 36,105 Yuan (US$5,285). The total value of imports and exports was 3.4 billion US dollars. The total financial revenue was 23 billion Yuan.

=== Industrial zones ===
National level development zones

- Nanchang Export Processing Zone

Nanchang National Export Expressing Zone is located in Nanchang Hi-Tech Industrial Development Zone, it was approved by the State Council on May 8, 2006, and passed the national acceptance inspection on Sep 7th, 2007. It has a planning area of 1 km^{2} and now has built 0.31 km^{2}. It enjoys simple and convenient customs clearances, and special preferential policies both for Nanchang National Export Expressing Zone and NCHDZ.

- Nanchang National High-tech Industrial Development Zone

Nanchang National High-tech Industrial Development Zone (NCHDZ for short hereafter) is the only national grade high-tech zoned in Jiangxi, it was established in Mar. 1991. The zone covers an area of 231 km^{2} (89 sq mi), in which 32 km^{2} (12 sq mi) have been completed. NCHDZ possesses unique nature condition and sound industry foundation of accepting electronics industry. NCHDZ has brought 25 percent industrial added value and 50 percent industrial benefit and tax to Nanchang city by using only 0.4 percent land area.

- Nanchang Economic and Technological Development Zone

Provincial level development zones

- Jiangxi Shanghai Economic and Technological Development Zone
- Nanchang Yingxiong Economic and Technological Development Zone

Special economic district

- Honggutan New District GanJiang New District

== Transportation ==
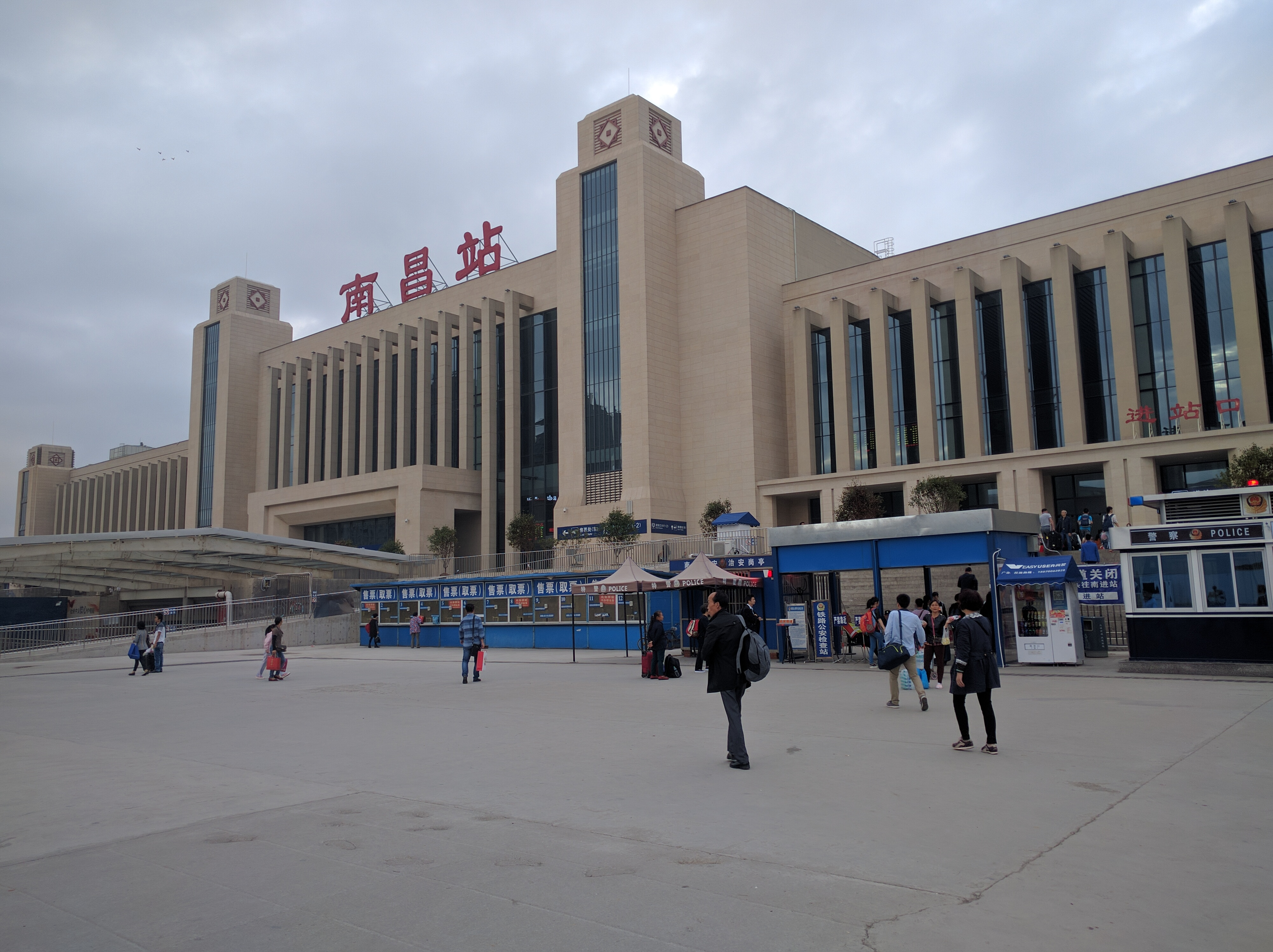
Nanchang Railway Station East Square

Nanchang is located in a geographically strategic area and has an extensive transportation network. It is described as the "three rivers and five lakes, and the control of the finer and better lakes". High-speed railways and aviation hubs connect the city to three major economic regions: the Yangtze River Delta, the Pearl River Delta and the Haixi Economic Zone. Nanchang is one of China's comprehensive transportation hubs and a major integrated transportation hub in Jiangxi Province.

=== Rail ===
The Nanchang is an important rail hub for southeastern China. The Beijing–Kowloon (Jingjiu) Railway, Shanghai–Kunming railway (formerly Zhejiang–Jiangxi or Zhegan Railway), Xiangtang–Putian railway and Nanchang–Jiujiang intercity railway converge in Nanchang. Nanchang's Bureau of Railways operates much of the railway network in Jiangxi and neighbouring Fujian province. The Nanchang railway station and the Nanchang West railway station are the primary passenger rail stations of the city. Nanchang is connected to Hangzhou, Changsha and Shanghai via CRH (China Railway High-speed) service.

=== Air ===
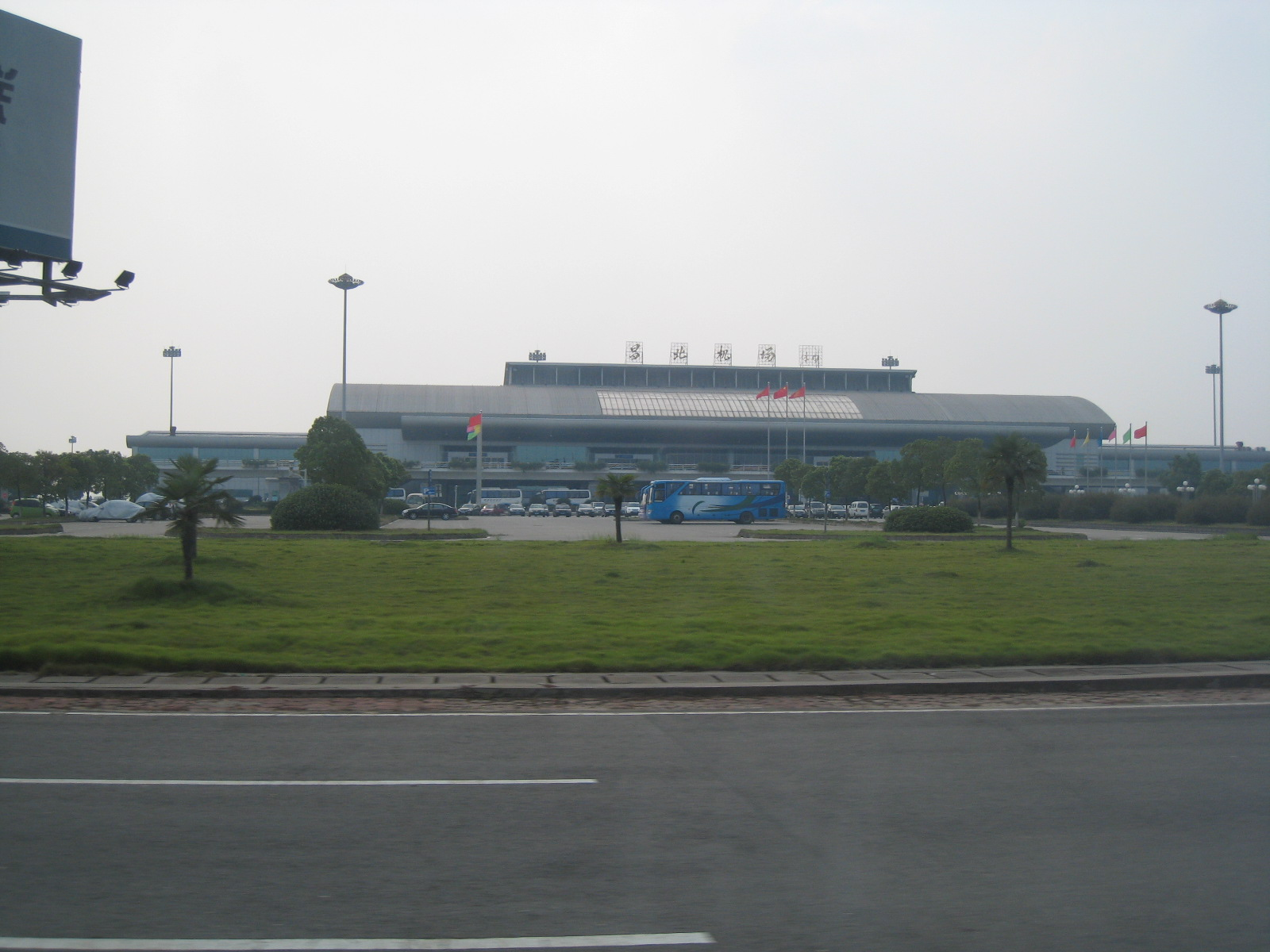
Nanchang International Airport

Nanchang Changbei International Airport (KHN) built in 1996 is the main international airport. It is situated in Lehua Town, 26 kilometres north of the CDB area. Changbei International Airport is the only one in Jiangxi Province which has an international air route. The airport is connected to major mainland cities such as Shenzhen, Guangzhou, Haikou, Shanghai and Beijing. There is a military/civilian airport near Liantang, Nanchang County.

Nanchang Changbei International Airport is the largest airport in Jiangxi Province. In 2014, Nanchang Changbei Airport opened up to 10 international destinations. The airport handled 7.25 million passengers in 2014, an increase of 6.3%. Among them, the Nanchang aviation port exceeded 280,000 passengers, an increase of nearly 40%, becoming the airport's traffic volume. The important force of growth, and will continue to maintain rapid development. On December 6, 2017, the annual passenger throughput of Nanchang Airport exceeded 10 million passengers, making it the nation's 31st “million-grade airport”. In 2017, passenger throughput reached 10.93 million, a year-on-year increase of 39.0%, a net increase of passenger throughput of 3.07 million passengers; flights took off and 89,000 vehicles, a year-on-year increase of 35.2%; and cargo and mail throughput of 52,000 tons, an increase of 3.3%. In order to cooperate with the construction of the Beijing-Kowloon high-speed railway and Nanchang North Station airport complex transportation hub, large-scale expansion and upgrades are being carried out recently.

=== Road ===
The road transport infrastructure in Nanchang is extensive. A number of national highways cross through the city. They are the National roads No.105 from Beijing to Zhuhai, No.320 from Shanghai to Kunming, and No.316 from Fuzhou to Lanzhou. The major transport companies that operate in Nanchang are the Chang'an Transport Company Limited, the Nanchang Long-distance Bus Station, and the Xufang Bus Station. National Highway G70 crosses through Nanchang. Nanchang also built its round-city highway G70_01 opening in 2007.

The Nanchang Long-distance Bus Station serves long-distance routes to Nanjing, Shenzhen, Hefei and other cities outside Jiangxi Province. The Xufang Bus Station operates routes to cities, towns and counties within Jiangxi Province.

=== Metro ===
Nanchang Rail Transit is the first rail transportation system in Jiangxi Province, and has been in service since 26 December 2015. Nanchang is the 25th city in mainland China to install a metro. The planning of Nanchang rail transit project started in 1999 and was officially started in 2009. The first phase of the No. 1 and No. 2 lines was 50,996 kilometers (the first line is the underground line). Line 1 was officially opened and operated at the end of 2015, and Line 2 of the “First Section” began trial operation on August 19, 2017.

=== Water ===
Nanchang is situated on the Gan River, the Fu River, Elephant Lake, Qingshan Lake, and Aixi Lake. Hence the water routes for Nanchang are critically important for the economy, trade and shipping. Nanchang Port is the biggest port on the Gan River. Passengers can take Nanchang Port and travel by boat to the Jinggang Shan and Tengwang Pavilion. There are passenger ships that also visit Poyang Lake, Stone Bell Hill, Poyang Lake Bird Protection Area, Dagu Hill and other attractions.

== Landmarks ==
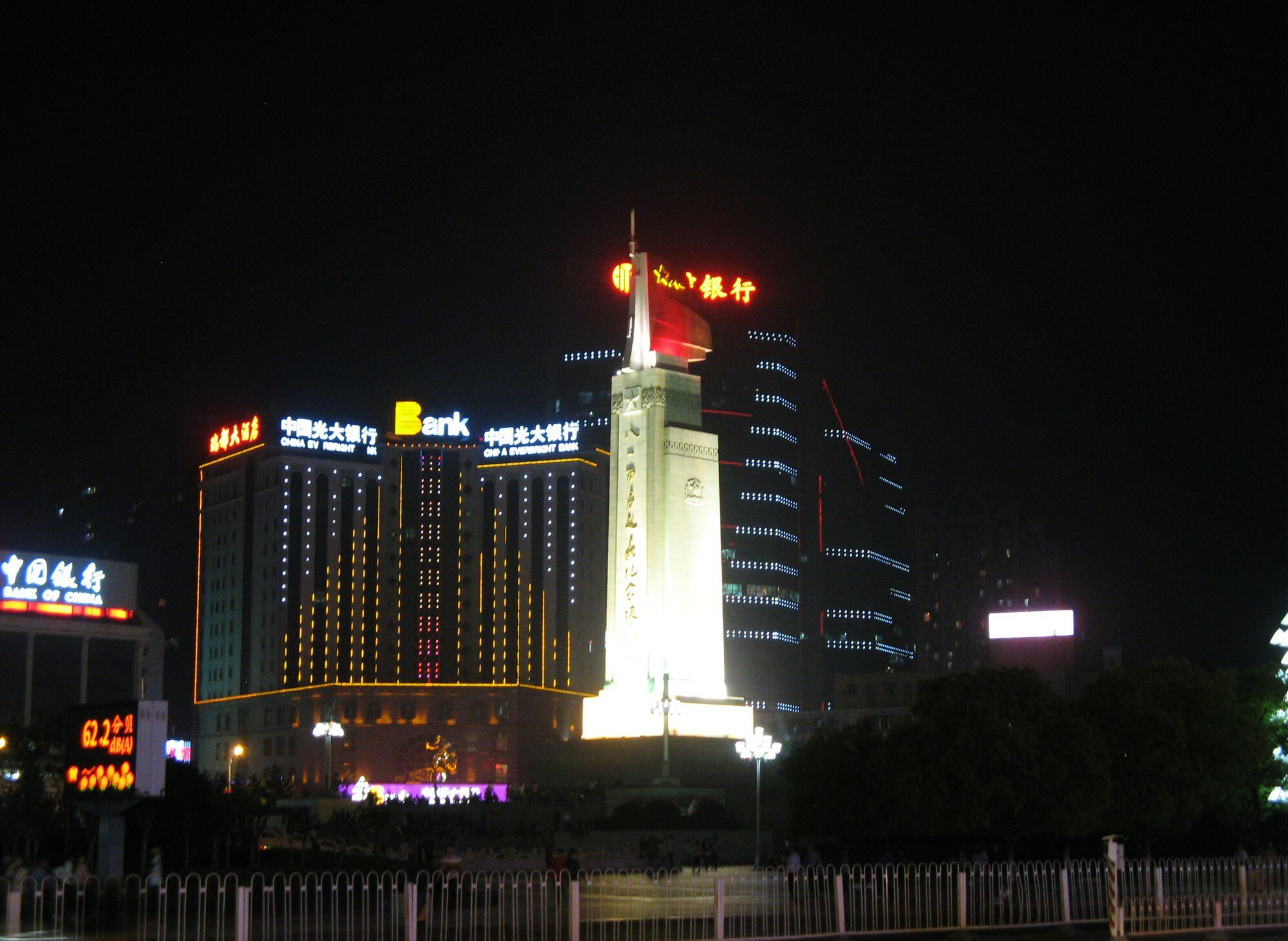
Bayi Square night view

- Tengwang Pavilion, a towering pavilion dating to 653, on the east bank of the Gan River and is one of "the Four Great Towers of China"
- Poyang Lake, the largest fresh water lake in China, it is also called "the Migrator Birds Paradise".
- Star of Nanchang, which was the world's tallest Ferris wheel from 2006 to 2008, in Honggutan District
- Qiushui Square, established on 28 January 2004 with the largest music fountain group with music in Asia.
- Jiangxi Provincial Museum and Bada Shanren Exhibition Hall
- People's Park, the largest park in downtown Nanchang
- Bayi Square and Memorial, at the center of Nanchang, commemorates the founding of the People's Liberation Army during the Nanchang Uprising of 1 August (Ba Yi in Mandarin) in 1927, which led to the formation of the People's Republic of China in 1949.
- Bada Shanren Memorial Hall is a large artistic scenic museum that includes sculpted art, and a general art museum.

== Gourmet food ==
Mixed Rice Noodles: Made primarily with rice noodles, mixed with peanuts, dried radish, chili oil, soy sauce, and other seasonings.

Earthenware pot soup: It is made by slow-cooking in an earthenware pot. Common flavors include pork rib soup, kelp soup, and chicken soup. It is very common to eat it with mixed rice noodles.

White sugar cake: Made from fermented rice, it has a soft texture and a sweet taste.

Stir-fried Artemisia annua with cured pork: This dish uses Artemisia annua from the Poyang Lake region, stir-fried with cured pork, and has a fragrant and smoky flavor.

Steamed Pork Belly with Rice Flour: This dish is made by coating pork belly with rice flour and steaming it, resulting in a soft, sticky, and fragrant texture.

Thick soup: made from sweet potato starch, vegetables and meat, and is mostly eaten in winter.

== Education ==
Nanchang is also a major city, appearing among the top 100 cities in the world by scientific research outputs, as tracked by the Nature Index. Colleges and universities (note that institutions without full-time bachelor programs are not listed):

- Jiangxi University of Finance and Economics (江西财经大学)
- Nanchang University (南昌大学)
- Jiangxi Normal University
  Jiangxi Normal University (江西师范大学)
- Nanchang Hangkong University (南昌航空大学)
- Jiangxi Agricultural University (江西农业大学)
- East China Jiaotong University (华东交通大学)
- East China University of Technology, Nanchang Campus (东华理工大学)
- Jiangxi Institute of Traditional Chinese Medicine (江西中医学院)
- Nanchang Institute of Technology (南昌工程学院)
- Jiangxi Science and Technology Normal University (江西科技师范学院)
- Jiangxi Manufacturing and Vocational College (江西制造职业技术学院)
- Jiangxi University of Traditional Chinese Medicine (江西中医药大学)

High schools:

- Nanchang Foreign Language School (南昌市外国语学校)
- Jiangxi University of Technology High School (江西科技学院附属中学)

International schools:

- Nanchang International School (南昌国际学校)

== Notable people ==
- Deng Chao (born 1979), actor
- François Cheng (born 1929), French academician
- Zhang Dinghuang (1895–1986), academic
- Grace Glenn (born 1998), American artistic gymnast
- Hu Hsen-Hsu (1894 – 1968), founder of plant taxonomy and pioneer of modern botany and paleobotany in China
- Cheng Maoyun (1900 – 1957), composer of the National Anthem of the Republic of China
- Duan Yongping (born 1961), Chinese-American entrepreneur
- Zhi Yueying (born 1961), educator

== Sport ==
Nanchang is the site of Jiangxi International Women's Tennis Open.

== Friendship cities ==
- Whakatāne, New Zealand
- Skopje, North Macedonia
- Takamatsu, Japan
- Albacete, Spain
- Perth, Australia
