= Nanchang International School =

Nanchang International School (formerly known as Nanchang WES Academy)

Location
- 1122 Phoenix Centre Road; Hong Gu Tan New District, Nanchang, Jiangxi Province; China
- Coordinates: 28.6991°N 115.8469°E

Information
- Type: Primary, international
- Motto: Where the love of learning grows, we grow
- Established: 2010
- School district: Hong Gu Tan New District
- President: Norman Chen
- Grades: Pre K - 4 (currently)
- Website: http://www.wes-ncis.org/
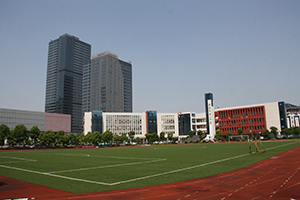

Nanchang International School (NCIS; simplified Chinese: 南昌国际学校; traditional Chinese: 南昌國際學校; pinyin: Nánchāng Guójì Xuéxiào) is an international primary school in Nanchang, Jiangxi Province, People's Republic of China.

Nanchang International School was established in August 2010 and is the first English-speaking international school in Jiangxi Province to be approved as an international school by the Chinese Ministry of Education. Matthew Bristow was the Founding Principal.

The school follows an inquiry-based curriculum and is authorized to teach the International Baccalaureate Primary Years Programme (PYP).

== Facilities ==
The school has a library, science room, sports hall, sports field, basketball courts, food technology room, ICT room, multi-purpose drama/music room, a gym, staff room, conference room, dining room and Mandarin room.
