= Wuhan Foreign Languages School =

- 武汉外国语学校

Location
- High school: 48 Wansongyuan Road Junior High School: Special 1 Taizi Lake, Dongfeng Avenue; Wuhan, Hubei; China; 30.5838°N 114.2686°E

Information
- Type: Public, Coeducational
- Motto: 爱国 好学 自强 图新 (Love the Motherland, Study Hard, Improve Oneself, and Make Innovations)
- Established: September 1964; 62 years ago
- Principal: Li Honglang
- Student Union/Association: Wuhan Foreign Languages School Students' Union
- Website: www.wfls.com.cn

Wuhan Foreign Languages School (WFLS; 武汉外国语学校) is a municipal public secondary school in Wuhan, Hubei, China. The school is managed by the Wuhan City Education Bureau. Established in 1964, it is one of the first seven foreign language schools in China. The school was designated a Hubei provincial key secondary school in 1984 and a provincial exemplar senior high school in 2000. Its alumni have become diplomats, including Fei Shengchao, Chinese ambassador to Belgium, and Lin Jian, spokesperson for the Ministry of Foreign Affairs of the People's Republic of China.

== History ==
Wuhan Foreign Languages School was founded in September 1964 as Hongshan Middle School (洪山中学). Wang Zhiqun was the school's founding principal. It was among China's initial seven foreign language schools. In its first year, WFLS taught only English, had one instructional building, and served 160 students, who boarded there. There were 18 classes in three grades: the first year of junior high had 12 classes, the second year had two classes, and the third year had four classes. The students in the two upper grades had transferred from Mafangshan Middle School (马房山中学) and No. 15 Middle School (第十五中学). Hongshan Middle School's first class of graduates finished their studies in 1965. In 1966, WFLS served 503 students and offered six classes at each of the primary and junior high levels. The school expanded its language offerings beyond English to German and French in 1972.

The school discontinued accepting primary school students from 1978. That year, the school moved from an uninterrupted five-year secondary curriculum to six years of a "3–3" system divided equally between junior high and senior high. The curriculum shifted time away from foreign language classes, reducing this from 10 to 12 periods to eight to 10 periods and reallocating two to three periods to teaching science. WFLS began using textbooks published in France, Germany, and Japan. Another pedagogical focus was on giving greater emphasis on listening and speaking, while also teaching reading, writing, and translation. Teachers implemented new teaching approaches incorporating physical objects, visual aids, and situational materials. The school was named a Hubei provincial key secondary school in 1984. It was named a provincial exemplar senior high school in 2000. Students have been invited to address ministerial meetings of the United Nations.

In 2001, the school had 208 employees, of whom 53 were designated as senior professionals. That year, it served 1,938 students who were enrolled in junior high and senior high. That year, it could employ up to seven foreign teachers, having previously secured a Class B license from the State Administration of Foreign Experts Affairs. Twenty of its students have achieved the highest scores in the province or city in the gaokao, the college entrance examination. According to Farmers' Daily in 2009, although parents have criticized teachers for being too easygoing and giving students too little homework, more than 90% of the school's students are admitted into top universities. Alumni attend universities including Peking University, Tsinghua University, and the University of Hong Kong and universities in France, Germany, the United Kingdom, and the United States.

By 2001, the school had over 5,000 alumni who were based throughout China and the world. More than 200 of the school's graduates held positions in government agencies at the national level including the Ministry of Foreign Affairs and the Ministry of Commerce. A number of alumni have become diplomats and have worked as staff members of leading figures in the Chinese Communist Party and the state. The school entered into sister school partnerships with schools in France, Germany, New Zealand, and the United States and also collaborated with educational institutions and groups in Australia, Canada, Japan, and the United Kingdom.

== Campus ==
WFLS is located at Wuhan Economic and Technological Development Zone near Taizi Lake. It is at the southern base of the Luoxiao Mountains. To the school's east is Wuhan University and to its west is the Hubei Military District. The school's campus occupies 173,625 m^{2} (42.904 acres), of which the floor area is 65,160 m^{2} (16.10 acres).

== Notable alumni ==
- Fei Shengchao, Chinese ambassador to Belgium
- Lin Jian, spokesperson for the Ministry of Foreign Affairs of the People's Republic of China and 1995 graduate of the school
- Miranda Qu, co-founder of the Chinese social networking website Xiaohongshu

== See also ==
- List of foreign-language schools in China
