= Lin Jian =

Chinese diplomat (born 1977)

- 林剑
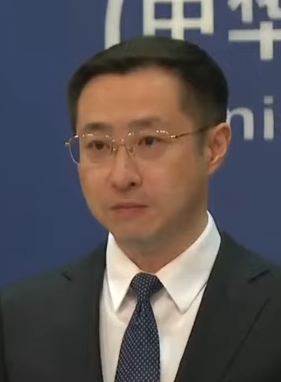
- Lin in March 2024

Deputy Director of the Information Department of the Ministry of Foreign Affairs
- Incumbent
- Assumed office 18 March 2024 Serving with Mao Ning, Wang Wenbin, Jiang Xiaoyan, Hu Jian
- Director: Hua Chunying; Mao Ning

Personal details
- Born: May 1977 (age 49) Wuhan, Hubei, China
- Party: Chinese Communist Party
- Education: Beijing Foreign Studies University (BA)

Chinese name
- Simplified Chinese: 林剑
- Traditional Chinese: 林劍
Transcriptions
Standard Mandarin
- Hanyu Pinyin: Lín Jiàn

Lin Jian (林剑; born May 1977) is a Chinese diplomat who has been serving as the 34th spokesperson for the Ministry of Foreign Affairs of the People's Republic of China and deputy director-general of the Department of Press, Communication, and Public Diplomacy of the Ministry of Foreign Affairs of the People's Republic of China since March 2024. Lin has been working for the Ministry of Foreign Affairs from 1999 to 2020 and was dispatched to serve as party secretary and director of the Foreign Affairs Office of the Xinjiang Production and Construction Corps from 2020 to 2024.

== Biography ==
Lin was born into a military family in Wuhan, Hubei, in May 1977. Lin attended Wuhan Foreign Languages School for high school and graduated in 1995. He went on for undergraduate education and graduated from Beijing Foreign Studies University with a major in English in 1999. After graduation, he joined the Ministry of Foreign Affairs in 1999 and was selected to study abroad in Denmark. He was later assigned to the Political Office at the Embassy of the People's Republic of China in the Kingdom of Denmark. Since then, he had served as political counselor at the Embassy of the People's Republic of China in the Republic of Poland and as counselor at the Department of European Affairs of the Ministry of Foreign Affairs of the People's Republic of China.

From 2020 to 2024, he was dispatched to serve as party secretary and director of the Foreign Affairs Office of the Xinjiang Production and Construction Corps. During his tenure in Xinjiang, in 2022, he took part in talks seeking to boost exchanges in trade and tourism between Xinjiang and Hong Kong.

=== Spokesperson for the Ministry of Foreign Affairs ===
On 18 March 2024, Lin was appointed as the 34th spokesperson of the Ministry of Foreign Affairs and as deputy director-general of the Department of Press, Communication, and Public Diplomacy of the ministry. On the same day, he presided his first regular press conference.

==== Cyber attack accusations ====
In March 2024, Lin accused the United Kingdom and the United States of "political manipulation" after both of these countries blamed a Chinese state-run cyber unit over an alleged cyber attack on Britain's electoral commission and Members of Parliament. He further added that both the US and the UK should "stop politicising cyber security issues".

==== South China Sea ====
During a visit of US Secretary of State Antony Blinken to Manila in March 2024, Lin told the US of having no rights to interfere between China and the Philippines' issues on the South China Sea. He urged the Philippines to "stop bringing external forces to safeguard its so-called security" on disputed waters adding that such showcasing of external forces shall provoke confrontations and aggravate tensions. In May 2024, he expressed China's concerns over the deployment of a US-launched missile system being transported to the northern region of the Philippines.

Responding to Filipino Defense Secretary Gilbert Teodoro's comments of China's "ramping up pressure" to the Philippines in November 2024, he claimed that the territorial dispute will not escalate if the Philippines no longer "infringes and provokes".

==== US tariffs ====
After the Biden administration announced new tariffs and additional import taxes on Chinese electric vehicles and goods, Lin commented that: "Instead of ending those wrong practices, the US continues to politicize trade issues, abuse the so-called review process of Section 301 tariffs and plan tariff hikes".
