= Hebei Tangshan Foreign Language School =

Hebei Tangshan Foreign Language School 河北唐山外国语学校

Address
- 189 W Beixin Ave; Tangshan, Hebei; China

Information
- Former name: Tangshan No. 8 Middle School
- Type: Secondary school

Hebei Tangshan Foreign Language School (previously Tangshan No. 8 Middle School) is a public secondary school in Tangshan, Hebei, China.

== See also ==
- List of foreign-language schools in China
- List of high schools in Tangshan
