= Nanchang Foreign Language School =

School in Nanchang, China

Nanchang Foreign Language School (南昌外国语学校) is a middle and high school located in Nanchang, the capital city of Jiangxi province, China. Designated by Ministry of Education of the People's Republic of China as one of the only 16 high schools in Mainland China that possess "direct admission" quotas (保送生) to send students directly to universities in China while waiving the National Higher Education Entrance Examination (the Gao Kao exam, 高考), It is the first council foreign language school in the Jiangxi province and it is also a key school in Nanchang.

== History and location ==
The school was established in the 1994, and was originally called Nanchang No.22 School. It was situated in 126 Tao Yuan Zhong Road, Nanchang. The school occupies approximately 60 mu. Since 1994, the president of Nanchang Foreign Language School has been Ms. Wang Xiuying.

== Students ==
Pupils from primary schools around the city have to pass a special exam to register at the Nanchang Foreign Language School. Nanchang Foreign Language School is one of the 16 foreign language schools which can recommend high school students for admission to college. It was about 20 per cent student have chance to take the walk exams in the 2010. Nanchang Foreign Language School is made up of three-year high school and three-year middle school. There are 54 classes in the school with 3,260 students. There are 24 classes in the high school and 30 classes in the middle school.

== Faculties ==
In 2011, the staff and teaching faculty of Nanchang Foreign Language School include 213 people among whom are 26 teachers with Master degree and many senior teachers. There are also several foreign teachers from Japan, Spain, the United States, the UK and other countries. And the teachers also have chance to be sent abroad to study like the United States, the UK, Japan and Australia and New Zealand.

== Facilities ==
Nanchang foreign language school is composed of two campuses including junior and senior. The school offers modern classrooms, planetarium, ecological hall, computer rooms, libraries, labs, lecture hall, dining rooms, gyms and other first class facilities to all the students and teachers.

== Motto ==
The motto of Nanchang Foreign Language School is morality and dedication, integrity and education (Chinese: 明德敬业，正己立人). And school believes in the philosophy of "development for all, all are excellent".
