= Xiamen Foreign Language School =

Coordinates: 24.45577°N 118.03767°E

- 厦门外国语学校

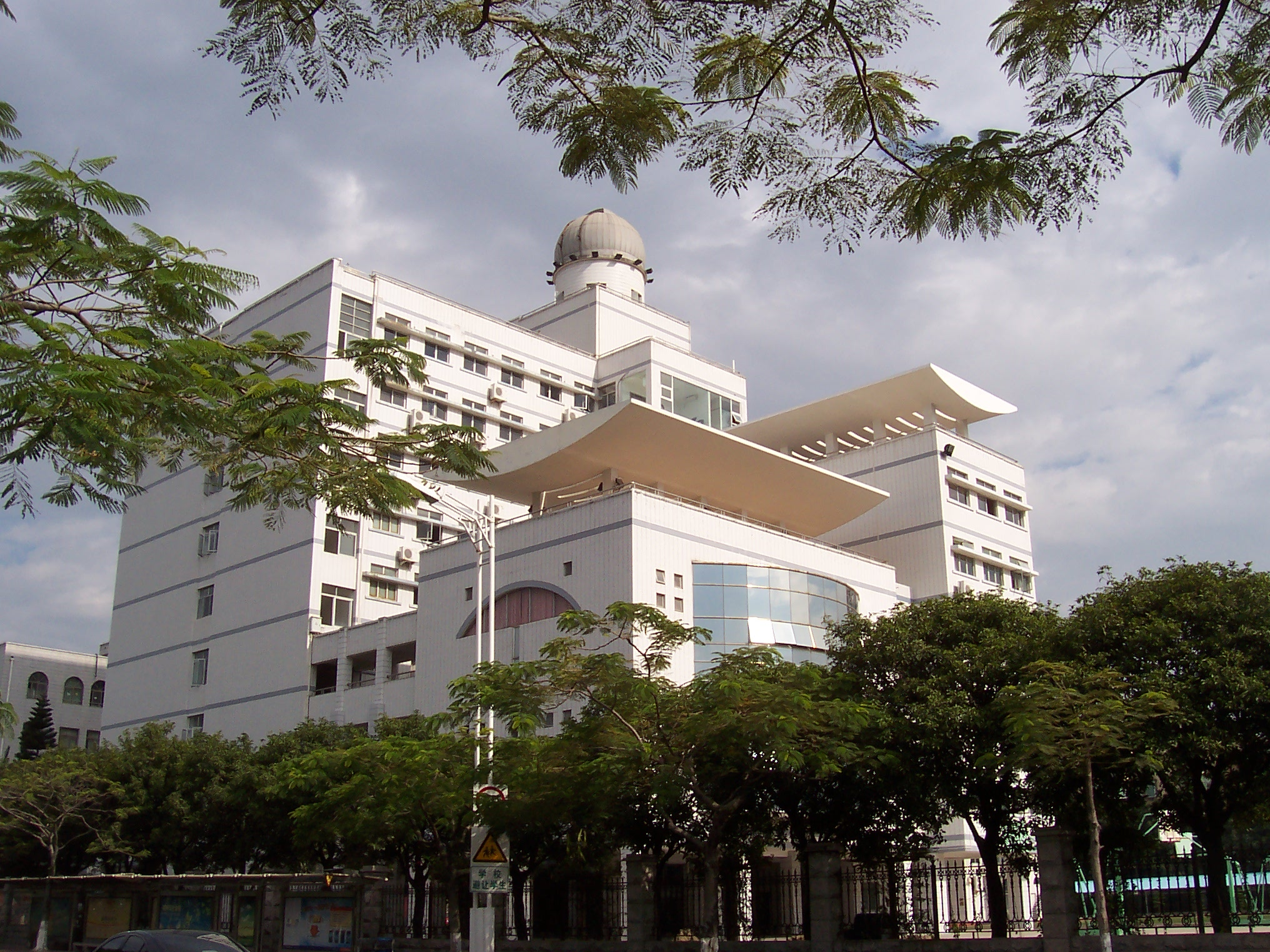
- No. 88 N Hubin Road and No. 89 Songyu Road, Xiamen, Fujian; China

Information
- Type: Public
- Motto: The Perfection of Virtue and Learning (进德修业)
- Established: December, 1981
- School district: Siming and Haicang District
- Principal: Liu Iskender (刘承睿)
- Staff: 300
- Enrollment: 3,800
- Website: www.xmfls.net

Xiamen Foreign Language School (Chinese: 厦门外国语学校; pinyin: xiàmén wàiguó yǔ xuéxiào) is a secondary and senior high school in Xiamen, Fujian, China,

== Facilities ==
The school has two campuses that cover 112,707 m^{2} with four buildings of 65,222 m^{2}. The school hosts three classroom buildings, two laboratory buildings, an education technology center, two administrative office buildings, a library, an art center, a gym building, three dormitories, two dining halls, a teachers dormitory and two apartment buildings for foreign teachers. The school has 12 physics laboratories, 12 chemistry laboratories and 9 biology laboratories.

The multifunction building offers language laboratories, audio-visual education classrooms, labor and technique education classrooms, computer classrooms, music and art education classrooms, and three lecture theaters. A kilometer school network includes about 500 terminals.

The school libraries harbor 105,000 volumes.

On the playground are 200m and 400m plastic cement track rings, an indoor track area, eight basketball courts, six volleyball courts and two football fields.

The school has 62 classes (including English medium classes) with about 3000 students and 240 teachers including 37 senior teachers, 86 Rank-one teachers and 36 staffers.

== Purpose ==
The school provides three years for junior high school and three for senior high school. It enrolls students competitively. It enrolls new students for Junior One (初一 chū-yī) on the basis of competitive selection from across the city. After they finish the junior level, most continue their study except those who are not suitable for further development as foreign language students.

The school emphasizes the English language. Therefore:

- it carries out the unified teaching plans of foreign language schools throughout the country. In addition, it uses original edition foreign textbooks as well as textbooks compiled and published by the Chinese Ministry of Education,
- English classes are conducted in small units of about 20 students,
- Foreign teachers teach in the school,
- An English-practising course promotes the development of listening, speaking, reading and writing abilities.

The average total score, excellence rate and the assessment index for teaching quality came out at the top in the city's Junior Secondary School Graduation Examination. The school's excellence rate in the Provincial Senior Secondary School Graduation Examination matched first-rate

Since 1988, the average proportion of students entering universities or colleges has been above 85%. From 1996 to 2004, it was 99.05% (100% for 1996, 1999, 2003 and 2004). A graduate in 2000 got first place in the college-entrance examination instituted for students of liberal arts in Fujian Province.

School honours include:

- civilized unit and a civilized school awards both in Xiamen and Fujian Province
- advanced unit award in Fujian Province for the work done in passing on knowledge and enlightening people,
- advanced unit recognition for the achievements of young teachers and for audio-visual teaching.
- advanced unit in Fujian Province for the comprehensive measures for maintaining law and order in the primary and secondary schools,
- another honour for supporting the People's Liberation Army and giving preferential treatment to military families and supporting the government and cherishing the people
- keeping work files in good order
- nationwide audio\visual teaching work.
- good school environment in the school (standing committee of the Fujjan Provincial People's Congress).
- Party General Branch was selected as an advanced party organization at basic level in Xiamen.

== Sister School ==
Hangzhou Foreign Language School

== International Cooperation ==
Xiamen Foreign Language School has established international cooperation with these educational institutions:

- (Canada) Columbia International College
- (United States) Atlanta International School
- (United States) Linden High School NJ
- (Netherlands) Alfrink College Zoetermeer
