= Fei Shengchao =

Chinese ambassador to Somalia

- 费胜潮
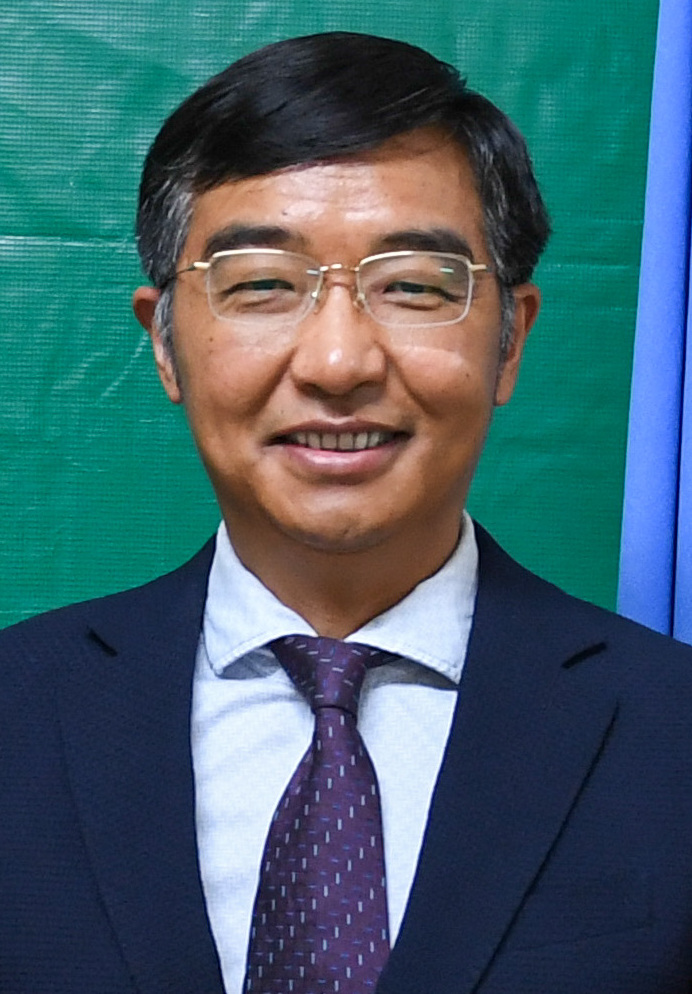

Chinese Ambassador to Belgium
- Incumbent
- Assumed office 5 July 2024
- Appointed by: Xi Jinping
- Preceded by: Cao Zhongming

Chinese Ambassador to Somalia
- In office 7 September 2021 – April 2024
- Appointed by: Xi Jinping
- Preceded by: Qin Jian

Counsellor at the Chinese Embassy in Cyprus
- In office 2013–2015

Counsellor at the Chinese Embassy in Australia
- In office 2015–2016

Personal details
- Born: October 1, 1973 (age 52)
- Education: Master's degree in law
- Occupation: Diplomat

Fei Shengchao (Chinese: 费胜潮; pinyin: Fèi Shèngcháo; born October 1973), is a Chinese diplomat who is currently the Chinese ambassador to Belgium. He was previously the Chinese ambassador to Somalia.

== Personal life ==
Fei Shengchao is diplomat and government official from the People's Republic of China. He was born in October 1973 and pursued a master's degree in law, he is married and has one daughter.

== Career ==
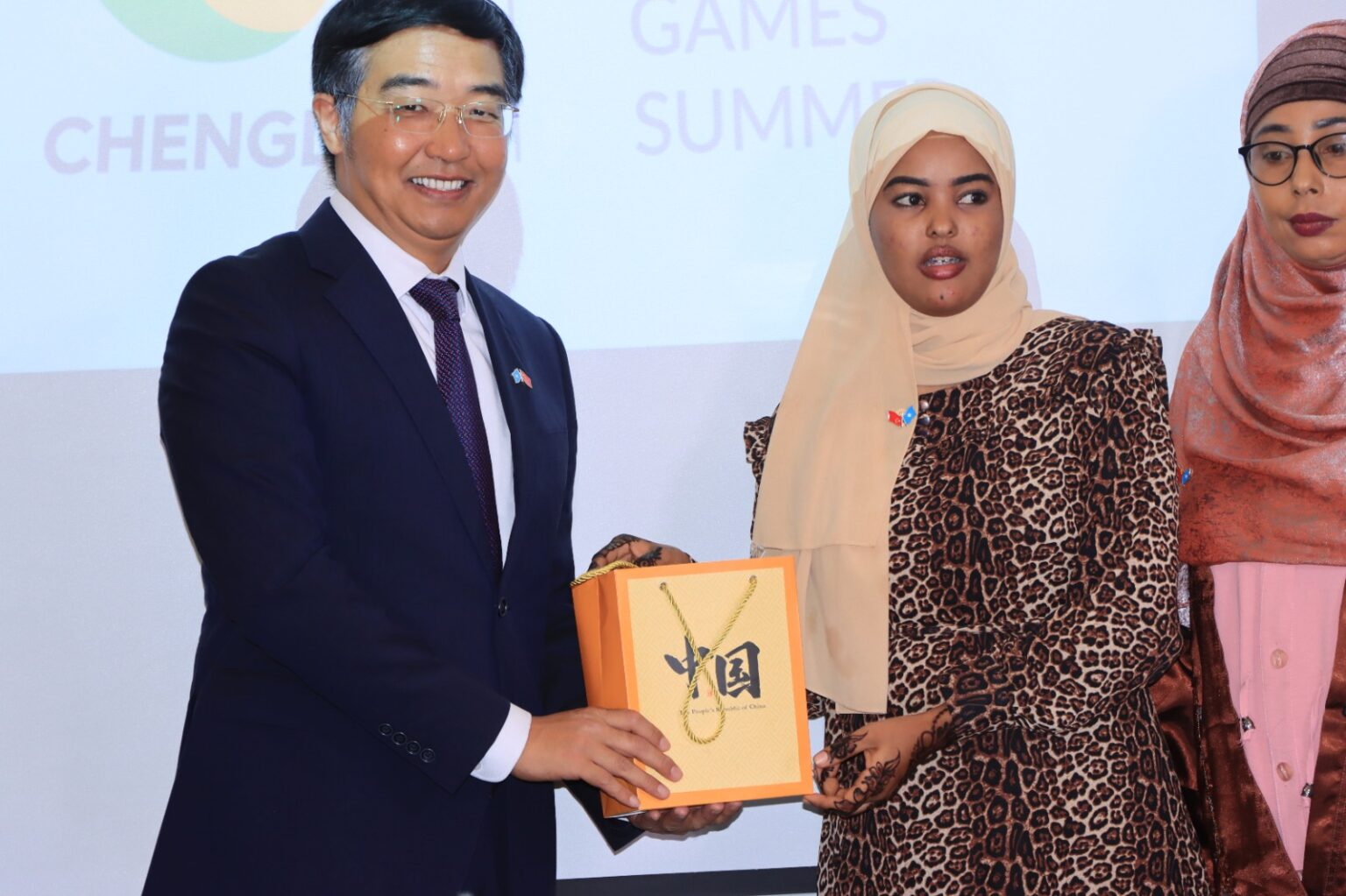
Nasra Abukar Ali and the Chinese Ambassador FEI Shengchao in Mogadishu

From 1996 to 2008, Fei Shengchao served in various capacities within the Ministry of Foreign Affairs. These roles included Section Officer, Attaché, Third Secretary, and Deputy Director at the Translation Office. During this period, he was involved in various diplomatic and administrative activities within the Ministry.

2008–2012 Director, Counselor, and Head of the Translation Office, Ministry of Foreign Affairs. 2013–2015 Counsellor, Embassy of the Cyprus, 2015–2016 Counsellor, Embassy of the Australia, 2016–2019 Deputy Director, Department of Translation, Ministry of Foreign Affairs, 2019-2021- Minister Counselor, Mission to the European Union.

On 7 September 2021, Fei was appointed the Ambassador of the China to the Somalia.

He was appointed as the Chinese ambassador to Belgium on 5 July 2024.
