= Shanghai Foreign Language School =

- 上海外国语学校
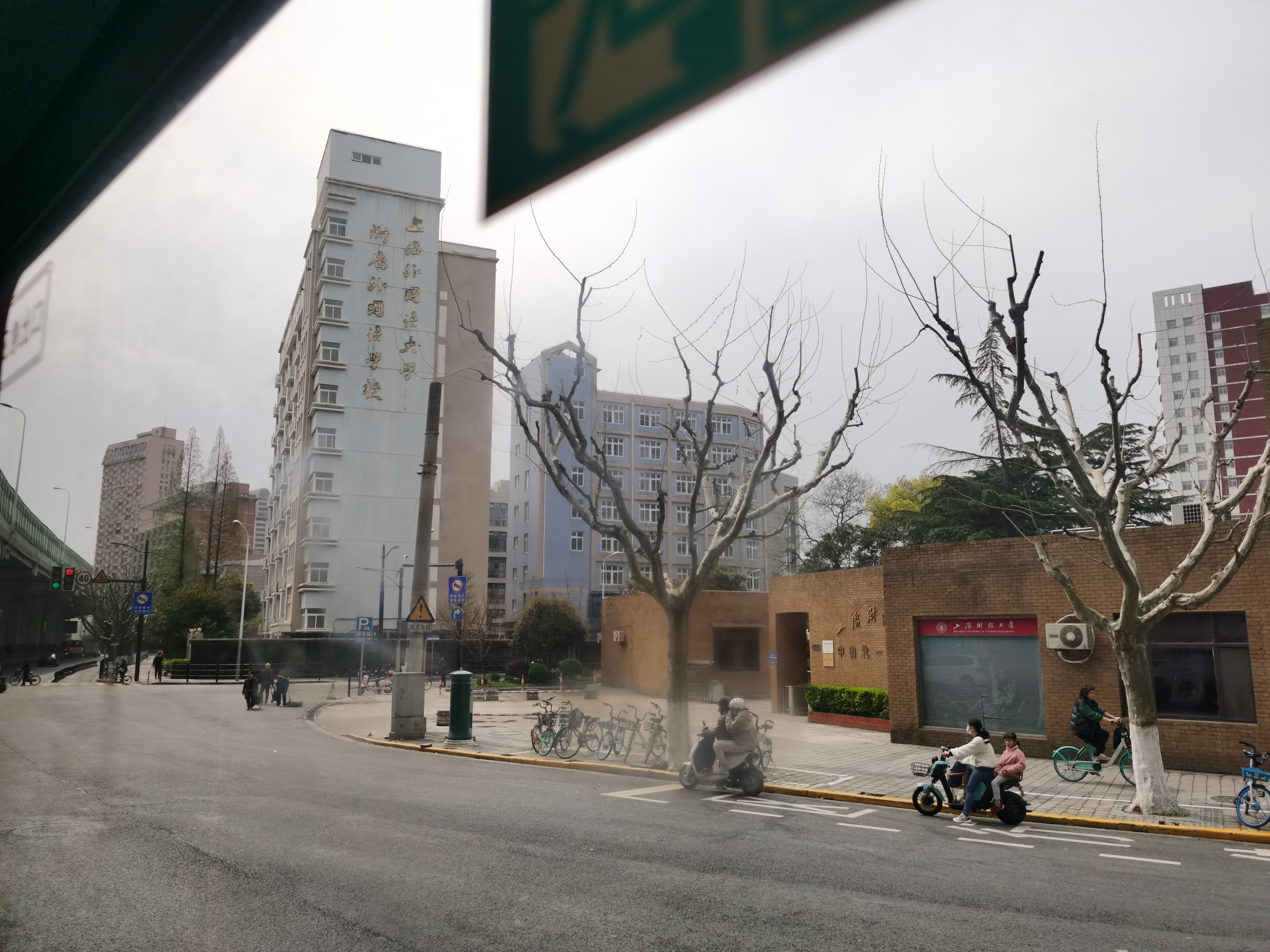
- Shanghai; China

Information
- Type: Secondary school
- Established: 1963
- Age range: 11-18
- Affiliation: Shanghai International Studies University
- Website: Shanghai Foreign Language School official website

Shanghai Foreign Language School (SFLS, Chinese: 上海外国语学校) is a secondary school based in Shanghai, China providing education encompasses grades 6 through 12. Foreign language teaching is traditionally a specialty.

Shanghai Foreign Language School (SFLS), affiliated with the Shanghai International Studies University (SISU), is a seven-year boarding school located in northeast Shanghai. It covers an area of 33 mu, with the total construction area of 22,508 square meters. SFLS was established in 1963, and reports directly to the Chinese Ministry of Education.

== Location ==
The school is located at 295 Zhongshan Bei Yi Road (中山北一路), Hongkou District (虹口区), Shanghai, China.

In February 2012, SFLS campus was temporarily moved to 730 North Station Road (车站北路730号) because of the demolition and refurbishment project on old school buildings.

In September 2015, SFLS moved back to the campus due to the finish of the project.

== History ==
It was founded in 1963 as one of China's seven earliest foreign language schools in the metropolis. The school is affiliated with the Shanghai International Studies University.

It is a full-time boarding school specializing in foreign language education. Receiving funds from China's Ministry of Education, it is a renowned middle school in Shanghai supervised jointly by Shanghai Municipal Education Commission and Shanghai International Studies University (SISU).

== Notable alumni ==
- Yang Jiechi, Foreign Minister of China.
- Wang Guangya, China's Vice Minister of foreign affairs and permanent representative of the People's Republic of China to the United Nations. Wang was also President of the UN Security Council for the month of February 2004.
- Cui Tiankai, Assistant Minister of Foreign Affairs of China

Joan Chen

== See also ==
- List of Foreign Language Schools in China
