= Chengdu Foreign Languages School =

Non-public secondary school in Chengdu, Sichuan, China

- 成都外国语学校

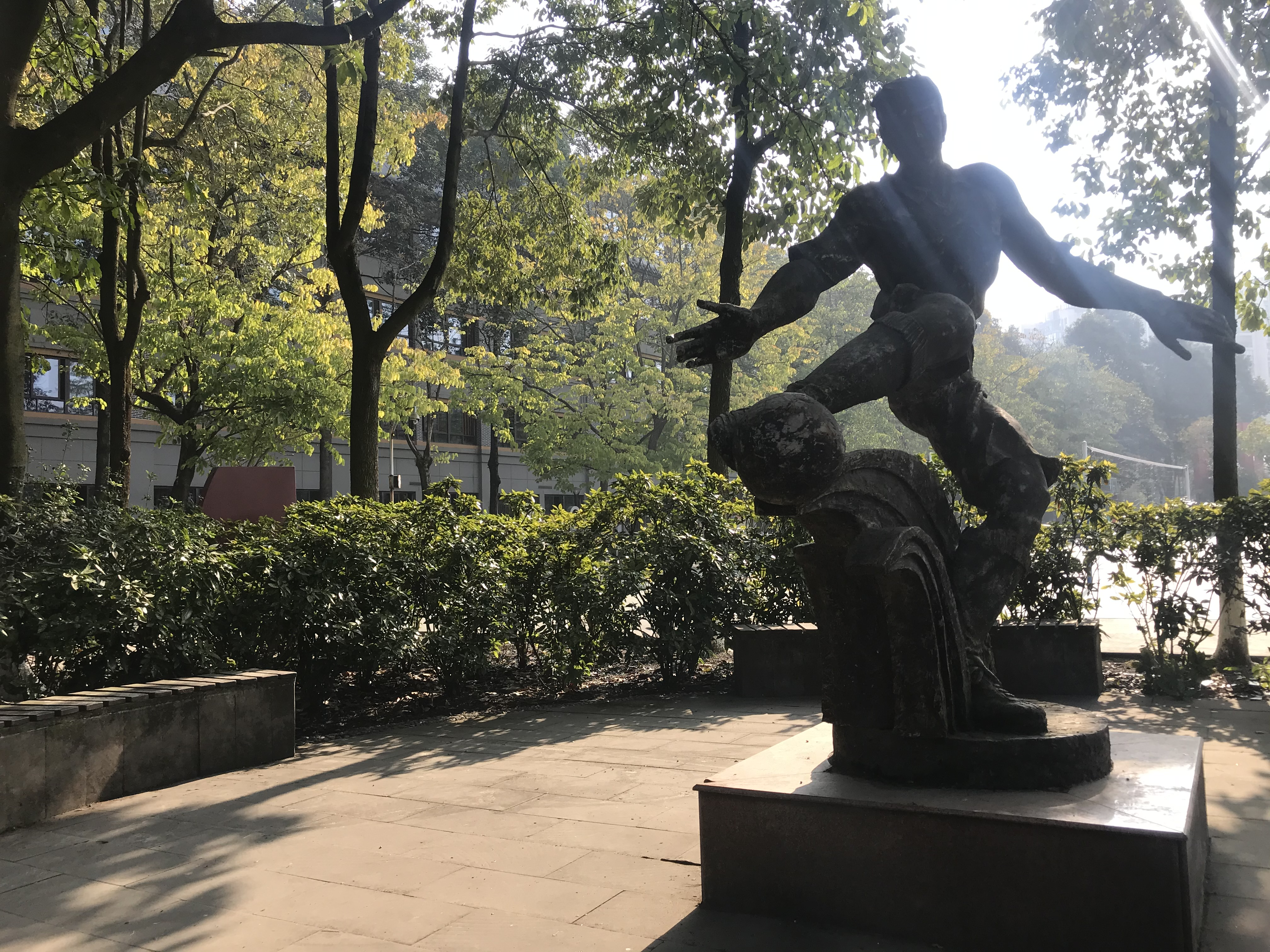
- Playground

Location
- 35 Baicao Road, Pidu District; Pidu, Chengdu, Sichuan, 611731; China

Information
- Type: Private secondary school
- Motto: 立学中华，语通世界 (Establishing Chinese scholarship, communicating with the world through languages)
- Established: 1989
- President: Gong Zhifa
- Principal: Xiong Anguo
- Staff: 745 (2020)
- Enrollment: 7,300 (2020)
- Website: cfls.net.cn

Chengdu Foreign Languages School (Chinese: 成都外国语学校; pinyin: Chéngdū Wàiguóyǔ Xuéxiào) is a non-public secondary school located in Pidu, Chengdu, Sichuan, China. Founded in 1989, it is privately owned and operated by Chengshiwai Education Management Company Limited. The school is under supervision of the Chengdu Municipal Education Bureau.

== Education ==
Chengdu Foreign Language School employs the standard education system of Sichuan Province in disciplines other than foreign languages. Students must choose English as one foreign language, and there are two special classes each grade: one for high-level English and the other for German, French, and Japanese (each student can only choose one). Enrollments of minor languages are controlled to be around 20 students for each language, and the admission scoreline in the interview very correspondingly.

=== Foreign Languages ===
Comparing with other middle schools, numbers of language lessons rise to nine classes per week, including one class given by foreign teachers for almost every grade. Language courses in CDFLS are smaller in class size than other courses, with only 20-30 students; small-size classrooms are also specially designed for such a class model. For English courses, junior high school students use special textbooks instead of standard textbooks in China, while students in senior high school use New Concept English 3.

== International Program ==
=== Europe ===
==== DSD ====
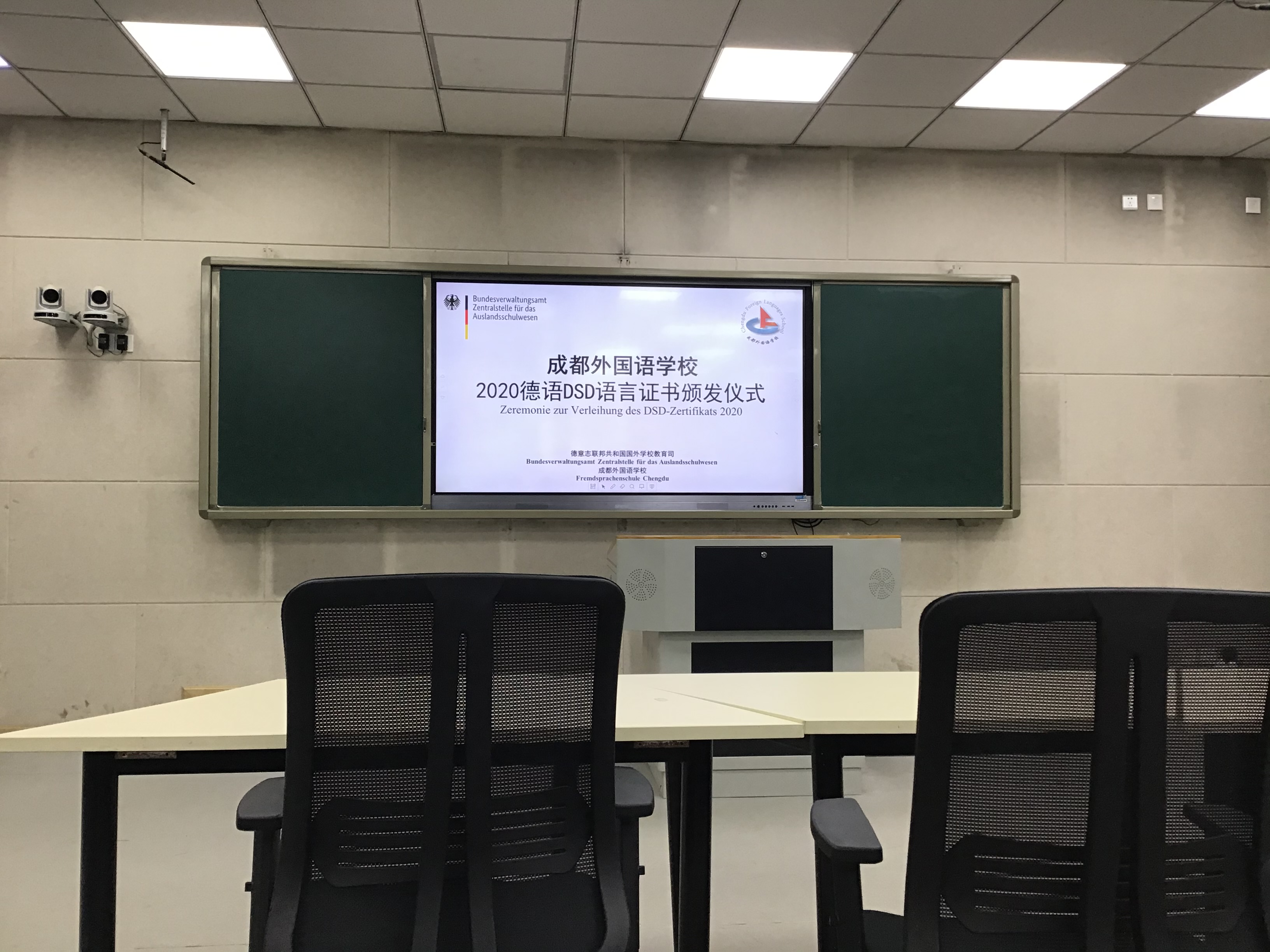

The DSD (Deutsch Sprach-Diplom) exam is a German university admission language certificate provided by the German government around the world. It is an authoritative German language test. This test is specifically for middle school students in DSD project schools. Candidates can apply for pre-admission to German universities or go directly to college with the DSD Level 1 (CEFR Level B1) or Level 2 (CEFR Level B2/C1) certificate. Once the certificate is obtained, it will be valid for life.

The German Department of Foreign School Education (ZfA) is responsible for the implementation of the global DSD examination. The German government sends professionally trained German teachers to support local German teaching for global DSD project schools. In addition, Germany regularly organises various forms of DSD German teacher training to continuously improve the professional level of German teachers.

=== North America ===
==== AP ====
School also holds various international programs. In the AP center, students can start taking AP classes in grade 10th and graduated with a recognized high school diploma. In Virscend Education Center, students can learn AP courses.

==== Sino-Canadian ====
In the Sino-Canadian Program, students can earn a dual degree of both Chinese and Canadian high school diplomas.

== Student life ==
=== Clubs ===
Chengdu Foreign Languages School offers over 70 student clubs, teams, and organizations that focus on art, community action, culture, environment, politics, music, dance, journalism, and more. And there is a club fair per semester.

=== Campus Culture ===
There are several festivals every year: Foreign Language festival, Science and Technology Festival, Art Festival, PE festival, and Chinese Language Festival.

== Campus ==
The school is on a 36-acre (15 ha) campus in Pidu, Chengdu, Sichuan, China. It has a Construction area of 160,000 m^{2} (1,700,000 sq ft) (4,500 m^{2} (48,000 sq ft) for teaching building, the library for 30,000 m^{2} (320,000 sq ft), science and technology museum for 3,000 m^{2} (32,000 sq ft), the stadium for 7,800 m^{2} (84,000 sq ft)). It also has its residential area which can contain 4600 students and a cafe which is capable to contain 5000 students. The Chinese Garden, which is a classic-Chinese garden, contains a small river, long benches, a rockery, etc. Students always go there for relaxation.
