= List of universities and colleges in Jiangxi =

The following is a list of universities and colleges in Jiangxi.

Name	Chinese name	Type	Location	Note
Nanchang University	南昌大学	Provincial	Nanchang	Project 211 Double First-Class Construction
East China Jiaotong University	华东交通大学	Provincial	Nanchang	
East China University of Technology	东华理工大学	Provincial	Nanchang	
Nanchang Hangkong University	南昌航空大学	Provincial	Nanchang	
Jiangxi University of Science and Technology	江西理工大学	Provincial	Ganzhou	
Jingdezhen Ceramic Institute	景德镇陶瓷大学	Provincial	Jingdezhen	
Jiangxi Agricultural University	江西农业大学	Provincial	Nanchang	
Jiangxi University of Traditional Chinese Medicine	江西中医药大学	Provincial	Nanchang	
Gannan Medical University	赣南医学院	Provincial	Ganzhou	Accredited with ECFMG & WDMS
Jiangxi Normal University	江西师范大学	Provincial	Nanchang	
Shangrao Normal University	上饶师范学院	Provincial	Shangrao	
Yichun University	宜春学院	Provincial	Yichun	
Jinggangshan University	井冈山大学	Provincial	Ji'an	
Jiangxi University of Finance and Economics	江西财经大学	Provincial	Nanchang	
Jiangxi University of Technology	江西科技学院	Private	Nanchang	
Jingdezhen University	景德镇学院	Provincial	Jingdezhen	
Pingxiang University	萍乡学院	Provincial	Pingxiang	
Jiangxi Science and Technology Normal University	江西科技师范大学	Provincial	Nanchang	
Nanchang Institute of Technology	南昌工程学院	Provincial	Nanchang	
Xinyu University	新余学院	Provincial	Xinyu	
Jiujiang University	九江学院	Provincial	Jiujiang	
Jiangxi Police Institute	江西警察学院	Provincial	Nanchang	
Jiangxi College of Engineering	江西工程学院	Private	Xinyu	
Nanchang Institute of Technology	南昌理工学院	Private	Nanchang	Its namesake is 南昌工程学院 in English
Jiangxi University of Applied Science	江西应用科技学院	Private	Nanchang	
Jiangxi Institute of Fashion Technology	江西服装学院	Private	Nanchang	
College of Science and Technology, Nanchang University	南昌大学科学技术学院	Private	Jiujiang	
Gongqing College, Nanchang University	南昌大学共青学院	Private	Jiujiang	
Institute of Technology, East China Jiaotong University	华东交通大学理工学院	Private	Jiujiang	
Yangteze River College, East China University of Technology	东华理工大学长江学院	Private	Fuzhou	
Science and Technology College, Nanchang Hangkong University	南昌航空大学科技学院	Private	Jiujiang	
College of Applied Science, Jiangxi University of Science and Technology	江西理工大学应用科学学院	Private	Ganzhou	
College of Science Technology and Art, Jingdezhen Ceramic Institute	景德镇陶瓷大学科技艺术学院	Private	Jingdezhen	
Nanchang Business College, Jiangxi Agricultural University	江西农业大学南昌商学院	Private	Jiujiang	
Science and Technology College, Jiangxi University of Traditional Chinese Medicine	江西中医药大学科技学院	Private	Jiujiang	
Science and Technology College, Jiangxi Normal University	江西师范大学科学技术学院	Private	Jiujiang	
Science and Technology College, Gannan Normal University	赣南师范大学科技学院	Private	Ganzhou	
Polytechnic Institute, Jiangxi Science and Technology Normal University	江西科技师范大学理工学院	Private	Nanchang	
Modern Economics and Management College, Jiangxi University of Finance and Economics	江西财经大学现代经济管理学院	Private	Jiujiang	
Nanchang Normal University	南昌师范学院	Provincial	Nanchang	
