= Jinshi (disambiguation) =

Jinshi (進士) was the highest degree offered by the ancient Chinese Imperial Examination.

Jinshi can also refer to:

- History of Jin or Jin Shi, a 14th-century history book on the Jurchen Jin dynasty

== Places ==
- Jinshi (進士里), in Yilan City, Yilan County, Taiwan
- Jinshi City (津市市), a county-level city in Changde, Hunan
- Jinshi Lake (金獅湖), a lake in Sanmin District, Kaohsiung, Taiwan

=== Towns ===
- Jinshi, Guangdong (金石镇), in Chao'an District, Chaozhou, Guangdong
- Jinshi, Lianyuan (金石镇), in Lianyuan, Hunan
- Jinshi, Xiangxiang (金石镇), in Xiangxiang, Hunan
- Jinshi, Xinning County (金石镇), in Xinning County, Hunan
- Jinshi, Dazhou (金石镇), in Tongchuan District, Dazhou, Sichuan
- Jinshi, Santai County (金石镇), in Santai County, Sichuan

=== Townships ===
- Jinshi Township, Hunan (锦石乡), in Xiangtan County, Hunan
- Jinshi Township, Jiangxi (巾石乡), in Suichuan County, Jiangxi

== Other uses ==
- Jinshi (The Apothecary Diaries), the male lead of a series of novels written by Hyūganatsu
- Tiến sĩ, meaning 'doctoral degree'. See Sino-Vietnamese vocabulary.
