= Guan Yi =

Chinese virologist

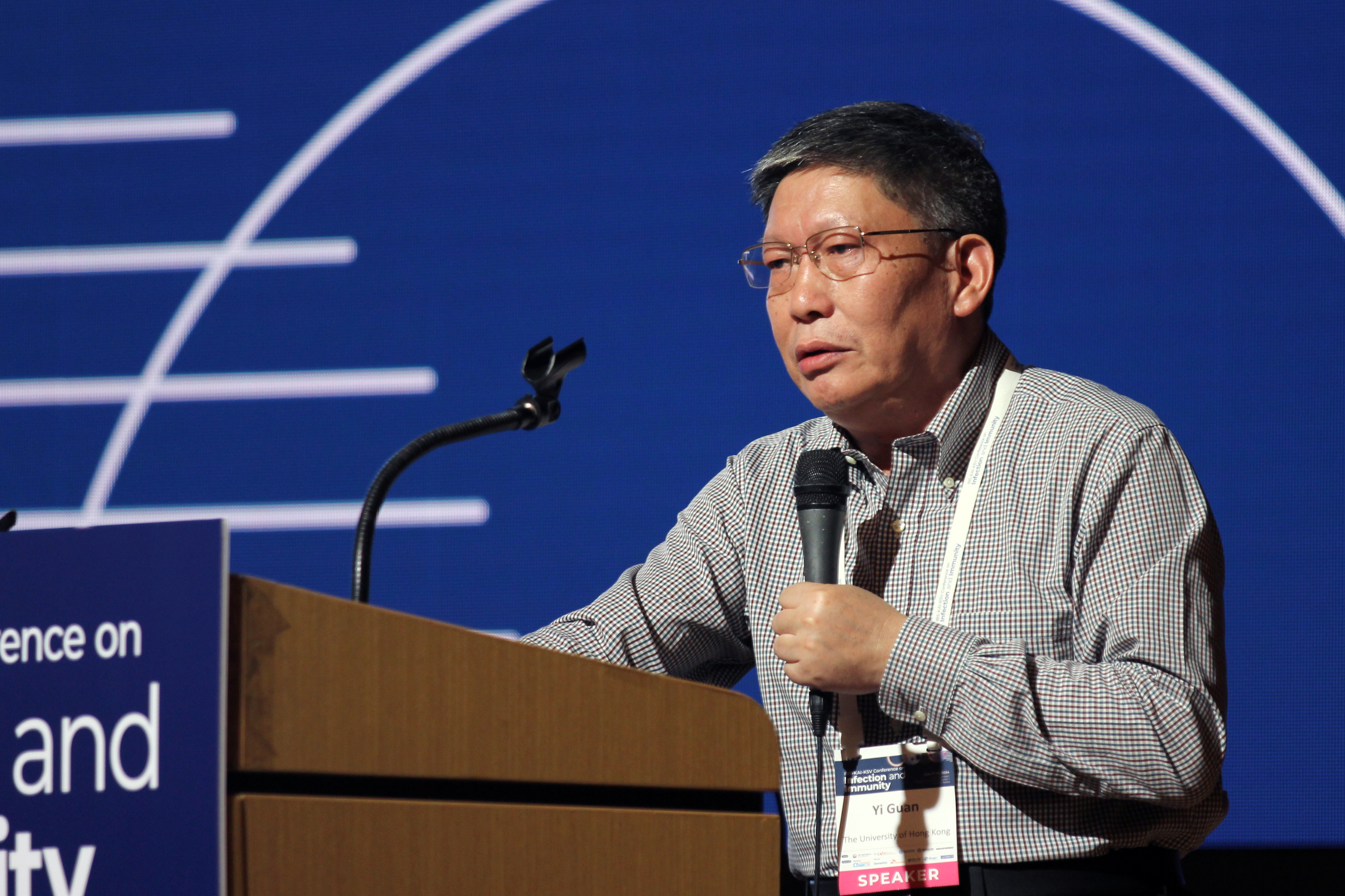
- Born: 1962 (age 63–64); Ningdu County, Jiangxi, China
- Education: Medical College of Nanchang University; Peking Union Medical College; University of Hong Kong
- Scientific career
- Fields: Virology
- Workplaces: University of Hong Kong
- Doctoral advisor: Kennedy Francis Shortridge
- Other academic advisors: Robert Webster

Chinese name
- Simplified Chinese: 管轶
- Traditional Chinese: 管軼
Transcriptions
Standard Mandarin
- Hanyu Pinyin: Guǎn Yì
- IPA: [kwàn î]

Guan Yi (simplified Chinese: 管轶; traditional Chinese: 管軼; born 1962) is a Chinese virologist. In 2014, he was ranked as 11th in the world by Thomson Reuters (now known as Clarivate Analytics) among global researchers in the field of microbiology. He obtained his PhD in microbiology at the University of Hong Kong and is now a professor of microbiology at his alma mater. His research on the viral respiratory disease SARS helped the Chinese government avert the 2004 outbreak of this disease. He is the current director (China affairs) of the State Key Laboratory for Emerging Infectious Diseases University of Hong Kong. In early 2017, Guan warned that the H7N9 influenza virus "poses the greatest threat to humanity than any other in the past 100 years".

== Education ==
Guan received his MD degree from the Medical College of Nanchang University (also known as Jiangxi Medical College), his advanced medical degree from Peking Union Medical College, and his PhD from the University of Hong Kong.

== Career ==
Focusing his research on influenza viruses throughout his career, Guan has identified all the major precursors and transmission pathways of the H5N1 variant that circulates in Southeast Asia, Europe and Africa and has provided most of the World Health Organization recommended pre-pandemic H5N1 vaccines strains.

Guan has, also, initiated the systematic study of H9N2 viruses, which, along with H5 viruses that are now regarded as the most likely novel influenza subtypes to cause a pandemic.

Guan has defined the role of domestic ducks in harboring and spreading influenza viruses and made major contributions in recognizing the emergence, evolutionary history and development of the 2009 H1N1 pandemic virus and revealed the genesis, infection source, evolutionary pathway and possible transmission route of the 2017 emerging H7N9 influenza virus.

Guan has also contributed to the identification of animal reservoirs for coronaviruses, leading a team to identify bats as a reservoir host for SARS-CoV and palm civets as an intermediate host for SARS-CoV.

Guan has worked for various highly esteemed universities and hospitals over the years. beginning his career from 1983 to 1986 as resident doctor (teaching assistant) (department of paediatrics) at First Affiliated Hospital of Jiangxi Medical College: Nanchang, CN. Soon after becoming "doctor-in-charge" (lecturer) (department of paediatrics) at Shantou University Medical College: Shantou, CN from 1989 to 1992. Moving on from there between 1993 and 1995 Guan was a Ph.D. candidate (department of microbiology) at the University of Hong Kong: Hong Kong, HK. He then moved to America between 1995 and 1997, where he completed his Ph.D. in the department of virology and molecular biology at St. Jude Children's Research Hospital: TN, Memphis, AM.

Guan then returned to University of Hong Kong: Hong Kong, HK, where he was employed from 1997 to 2000 as research assistant professor in the department of microbiology, then 2001 to 2013 as associate professor and senior lecturer in the department of microbiology, and from 2005 to 2011 as professor in the department of microbiology and finally from 2013 to 2016 he became the director of the Centre of Influenza Research. Guan Yi currently hold the position of chair professor in emerging viral diseases (school of public health) 2015 to present day.

Guan currently hold multiple high positions in highly esteemed health organizations across China.

He is director (Joint Influenza Research Centre (HKU & SUMC)) at Shantou University Medical College: Shantou, CN 2004 to present, director (International Institute of Infection and Immunity) Shantou University Medical College: Shantou, CN 2007 to present, director (State Key Laboratory for Emerging Infectious Diseases) University of Hong Kong: Hong Kong, HK 2005 to present, Daniel C K Yu Endowed Professor in Virology (School of Public Health) at University of Hong Kong: Hong Kong, HK 2012 to present, Part of the Joint Institute of Virology (STU/HKU) : Shantou, CN 2015 to present, and Joint Laboratory for International Cooperation in Virology and Emerging Infectious Diseases: China, CN 2016 to present in the Ministry of Education.

== COVID-19 pandemic ==
Guan has given expert comments on SARS-CoV-2 when interviewed by Caixin, warning that the coronavirus could be 10 times worse than the 2003 Sars outbreak. He said to media, "I have been through so many [disease outbreaks], and I have never been scared. Most [of the outbreaks] are manageable, but this time I am scared." What he said in his interview with Caixin were apparently different from that in most Chinese media, and it became highly controversial as journalists of state media reposted his previous statement, which he made on 15 January, claiming that the disease was manageable. The journalists also reposted the information that Guan's lab was once fined by the government in 2005. Wang Duan, the Caixin journalist who interviewed Guan Yi, described such behavior as "personal attacks" and complained that no expert had so far come forward to refute what Guan said.

In mid-July when a cluster of resurgent cases in Beijing was reported, Guan was interviewed by iNewsweek journal (中国新闻周刊) which shared his supportive opinion to the speculation that the virus imported into Beijing via contaminated frozen salmon fishes.

In what Bloomberg News called "a rare show of public criticism", Guan Yi criticised the Chinese government's zero COVID measures, telling Phoenix Hong Kong Channel that if the government persists with the policy for a handful of cases, then the economy will suffer. Guan has advocated for increased vaccination and research into the efficacy of homegrown vaccines against new variants.

== Awards and honors ==
In 2005, Time featured Guan as one of its 18 "Global Health Heroes", and in 2006, named him an "Asian Hero" for his influenza virus research work. In 2021 he was awarded the Canada Gairdner Global Health Award. In 2022, he became a laureate of the Asian Scientist 100 by the Asian Scientist.

== Academic publications ==
- Re‑emergence of fatal human influenza A subtype H5N1 disease: This Lancet paper documents the re‑emergence of fatal human infections with influenza A subtype H5N1 during early 2004, describing the clinical presentation, laboratory findings, and high case‑fatality rate observed.
- Avian flu: H5N1 virus outbreak in migratory waterfowl: This Nature Brief Communication reports the first detection of H5N1 avian influenza virus in wild migratory waterfowl, highlighting the role of wild birds in the geographic spread of the pathogen.
- Avian influenza virus (H5N1): a threat to human health: This Clinical Microbiology Reviews article provides a comprehensive overview of H5N1 avian influenza, covering its virology, pathogenesis, epidemiology, and the significant threat it poses to human health.
- Epidemiology and cause of severe acute respiratory syndrome (SARS) in Guangdong, People’s Republic of China, in February, 2003: This Lancet study investigates the epidemiology and causative factors of the 2003 SARS outbreak in Guangdong, China, characterizing transmission dynamics and clinical features of the disease.
