= Peng Qingxing =

Professor in the Aesthetic Medical School of Yichun University, China

- Born: 10 May 1938 (age 88); Jiangxi, China
- Known for: Editing the first global academic book of Medical Aesthetics
- Political party: Chinese Communist Party

Peng Qingxing (Chinese: 彭庆星; pinyin: péng qìng xīng), (b. November 1938) is professor and PhD mentor of medical humanity in the Aesthetic Medical School of Yichun University, China. He is one of the main initiators of Chinese holistic discipline of medical aesthetics and aesthetic medicine.

In 1988, he edited the first global academic book of Medical Aesthetics. In February 1989, Peng Qingxing founded the Oriental Medical Aesthetics Research Institute, one of the first medical aesthetics in the world.

== Works ==
- Peng Qingxing、Qiu Linzhi. 《Medical aesthetics》. ISBN 9787117128551.
- Peng Qingxing、He Lun、Qin Sizhe. 《The foundation of aesthetic medicine》. ISBN 9787030075062.
- Peng Qingxing. 《Philosophy of medicine and science》. ISBN 9787200130560.
- Peng Qingxing (2002). 《Introduction to Medical Aesthetics》. ISBN 9787117048521.
