= East China University =

East China University may refer to:

- East China University of Science and Technology
- East China University of Political Science and Law
- East China Normal University
- East China Jiaotong University

== See also ==
- Donghua University
