= Jiangxi Institute of Technology =

University in Nanchang, China

Coordinates: 28°41′03″N 116°00′48″E

- 江西科技学院
- Former name: Jiangxi Blue Sky University
- Motto: 自强不息, 求真务实
- Type: Private
- Established: 1994
- President: Wang Hai
- Undergraduates: 38,000
- Location: Nanchang, Jiangxi, China
- Campus: Urban: Nanchang: Yaohu campus
- Nickname: 江科
- Website: www.jxut.edu.cn

The Jiangxi Institute of Technology (JXIT; simplified Chinese: 江西科技学院; traditional Chinese: 江西科技學院; pinyin: Jiāngxī Kējì Xuéyuàn) is a private nonprofit university located in Nanchang, Jiangxi, China which was founded in 1994 and renamed from Jiangxi Blue Sky University (simplified Chinese: 江西蓝天学院; traditional Chinese: 江西藍天學院) in 2012. Jiangxi Institute of Technology has been ranked number 1 in private universities in China by the Network of Science and Education Evaluation in China since 2007.

== Programs ==
JXIT offers 35 undergraduate programs and 40 vocational programs.

== Students, faculty and staff ==
There are about 38,000 students and 3,000 faculty and staff on the campus, 100,000 alumni around the world. During the past five years, JXIT has ever hired 62 foreign teachers in total.

== Facilities and resources ==
JXIT focuses on practical skills and professional relevance. There are 17 practical training centers, including Vehicle Technology Center, Mechanic Foundational Experiment Center, Computer Technology Laboratory, Modern Production Technology Center, Clothing Design and Fabrication Center, Artistic Design and Implementation Center, Software and Internet Technology Center, Practical Nursing Center, Music and Dance Stadium, Basic Electrical Experiment Laboratory, Civil Engineering Center, Electrical Technology Center, Management Demonstration Center, Dynamic Laboratory, Basic Science Laboratory, Language Practice Center, and Physical Training Stadium.

== Affiliates ==
- Jiangxi University of Technology High School

== See also ==
- List of universities in China
- List of universities and colleges in Jiangxi
