= Xinjiang Township =

Xinjiang Township 新江乡
- Township
- Location in Jiangxi Xinjiang Township (China)
- Coordinates: 26°38′45″N 114°25′26″E
- Country: People's Republic of China
- Province: Jiangxi
- Prefecture-level city: Ji'an
- County: Suichuan County
- Time zone: UTC+8 (China Standard)

Xinjiang Township (simplified Chinese: 新江乡; traditional Chinese: 新江鄉; pinyin: Xīnjiāng Xiāng) is a township under the administration of Suichuan County, in Jiangxi, China. As of 2018, it has 11 villages under its administration.

== See also ==
- List of township-level divisions of Jiangxi
