= Jiangxi University of Technology High School =

- 江西科技学院附属中学

Location
- 1118 Jingdong Ave, Qingshanhu District (330029); Nanchang, Jiangxi; China

Information
- Type: Private
- Motto: Educated and reasonable, Forward-looking and creative 知书达理、进取求新
- Established: 2015
- Principal: Hu Yunxiang (胡云翔)
- Enrollment: 1500
- Campus: Urban
- Nickname: JKFZ
- Affiliations: Jiangxi University of Technology
- Website: www.jkfz.cn

The Jiangxi University of Technology High School (simplified Chinese: 江西科技学院附属中学; traditional Chinese: 江西科技學院附屬中學; Pinyin: Jiāngxī Kējì Xuéyuàn Fùshǔ Zhōngxué), colloquially Jiangkefuzhong abbreviated to JKFZ (Chinese: 江科附中), is a private nonprofit high school affiliated to Jiangxi University of Technology, founded in 2015, JKFZ is one of the most prestigious high schools in Jiangxi. JKFZ is situated in the Qingshanhu District of Nanchang, Jiangxi.

== Campus and facilities ==
The campus covers 67 thousand square meters. Campus facilities include a stadium, laboratories, computer center, library, science and technology museum, Chinese studies museum, geography park, sky bridge linking buildings, pottery room, cooking-skills room, intelligent access control system, all-weather monitoring system, drinking water system, as well as canteen, teacher's and student's lodging houses.

JKFZ equips every class with two classrooms, of which the main classroom will serve as a lecture hall as well as a quiet study space while the auxiliary classroom will be used as an activity, exploration, and life room. This is the first innovation among middle schools in Jiangxi Province.

The campus includes indoor basketball arena, badminton hall, table tennis training hall and gymnasium available under any weather conditions, as well as the 400m and 8-track synthetic-rubber track-and-field stadium, providing open spaces for students.

== Teachers ==
In 2015 JKFZ recruited 61 teachers as the founding teachers team, including 6 special-class teachers and 22 senior-level teachers, the average age is 36.

Further recruitment took place and there are 136 teachers, including 9 special-class teachers, 52 senior-level teachers.

In October 2016 there are now 222 teachers including 9 Foreign Teachers.

== Students ==
In 2015 JKFZ admitted following number of students:

Grade	Number of students
Primary Year 1	160
Primary Year 2	152
Primary Year 3	40
Primary Year 4	40
Junior Secondary Year 1	320
Junior Secondary Year 2	318
Senior Secondary Year 1	230
Senior Secondary Year 2	225

== See also ==
- Jiangxi University of Technology
- JKFZ Cambridge International School
