= Yang Yang (painter) =

Chinese-born American artist (born 1953)

Yang Yang (simplified Chinese: 杨扬; traditional Chinese: 楊揚; pinyin: Yáng Yáng; born 1953) is a Chinese-born American contemporary artist and sculptor. He creates figurative paintings and sculptures of unconventional forms. Lui Qi Wei, curator of the Museum of Fine Art in Shaanxi, describes Yang Yang's work as combining the quality of the "Oriental mystics with tragic magnificence." The medium of Yang Yang's works range from works on paper and canvas to sculptural works in fiberglass, ceramic or bronze. Yang Yang's works are internationally recognized and collected. His exhibitions include the Museum or Fine Art in Shaanxi China, the Minneapolis Institute of Art, and Gallery 456 of the Chinese-American Arts Council. Yang Yang currently resides in the United States.

Yang was born in 1953 in Nanchang, the capital of Jiangxi, China. He received a degree from Yichun Teacher's College in Yichun, Jiangxi, China. In 1984, Yang moved from China to the Sioux Falls, South Dakota, United States, to enroll at Augustana College, where he became a student of art and received a master's degree. After he completed further postgraduate study, he taught Chinese culture at Augustana. In 1991, he left Augustana for the Twin Cities, having begun working as an artist full time.

Yang is married and has a daughter, Ya Yang, who was the translator in Atlanta, Georgia, for the Chinese committee that sought to have the 1999 World Artistic Gymnastics Championships held in Tianjin.
