= Wang Yaonan =

Chinese scientist (born 1957)

- 王耀南
- Born: November 1957 (age 68); Longling County, Yunnan, China
- Education: East China University of Technology; Hunan University
- Scientific career
- Fields: Robot technology Intelligent control
- Workplaces: Hunan University

Wang Yaonan (Chinese: 王耀南; pinyin: Wāng Yàonán; born November 1957) is a Chinese scientist who is a professor at Hunan University and the current dean of its School of Robotics and College of Electrical and Information Engineering.

== Biography ==
Wang was born in November 1957 in Longling County, Yunnan. During the Down to the Countryside Movement, he was a sent-down youth. After the resumption of National College Entrance Examination, he was accepted to East China University of Technology, where he graduated in 1981. He obtained his master's degree and doctor's degree from Hunan University in 1992 and 1995, respectively. After graduation, he taught at the university. He was a postdoctoral fellow at National University of Defense Technology between 1995 and 1997. He was a Humboldt scholar at the University of Bremen from 1998 to 2001.

== Honours and awards ==
- November 22, 2019 Member of the Chinese Academy of Engineering (CAE)
