= Suichuan County =

Suichuan County 遂川县 Suichwan
- County
- Location of Suichuan County (red) within Ji'an City (gold) and Jiangxi
- Coordinates: 26°18′50″N 114°31′16″E
- Country: People's Republic of China
- Province: Jiangxi
- Prefecture-level city: Ji'an

Area
  - Total: 3,144.17 km^{2} (1,213.97 sq mi)

Population (2019)
  - Total: 622,200
  - Density: 197.9/km^{2} (512.5/sq mi)
- Time zone: UTC+8 (China Standard)
- Postal code: 343900
- Website: www.suichuan.gov.cn

Suichuan County (simplified Chinese: 遂川县; traditional Chinese: 遂川縣; pinyin: Suìchuān Xiàn) is a county in the southwest of Jiangxi province, People's Republic of China, bordering Hunan province to the southwest. It is under the jurisdiction of the prefecture-level city of Ji'an, and is its southernmost county-level division.

== Administrative divisions ==
Nowadays, Suichuan County has 11 towns and 12 townships.

11 towns

- Quanjiang (泉江镇)
- Yutian (雩田镇)
- Bizhou (碧洲镇)
- Caolin (草林镇)
- Duiziqian (堆子前镇)
- Zuo'an (左安镇)
- Gaoping (高坪镇)
- Dafen (大汾镇)
- Yaqian (衙前镇)
- Heyuan (禾源镇)
- Tanghu (汤湖镇)

12 townships

- Zhutian (珠田乡)
- Jinshi (巾石乡)
- Dakeng (大坑乡)
- Meijiang (枚江乡)
- Shuangqiao (双桥乡)
- Xinjiang (新江乡)
- Wudoujiang (五斗江乡)
- Xixi (西溪乡)
- Nanjiang (南江乡)
- Huangkeng (枚江乡)
- Daijiapu (戴家埔乡)
- Yingpanwei (营盘圩乡)

== Demographics ==
At the end of 2023, the total population of Suichuan County was 617,200.

== Economy ==
Suichuan County is one of the largest producers of kumquats in China.

== Climate ==
Suichuan County territory belongs to the central subtropical humid monsoon climate zone. Mild climate, abundant rainfall, abundant sunshine, four distinct seasons, long winter and summer, short spring and autumn, long frost-free period, the territory of the climate difference. The average temperature over the years is 19.1 °C, the average temperature in January is 7.4 °C, and the average temperature in July is 29.4 °C. The average annual precipitation is 1525.5 mm, and the average frost-free period is 350 days.

Climate data for Suichuan, elevation 126 m (413 ft), (1991–2020 normals, extremes 1981–present)
Month	Jan	Feb	Mar	Apr	May	Jun	Jul	Aug	Sep	Oct	Nov	Dec	Year
Record high °C (°F)	27.1 (80.8)	31.9 (89.4)	34.6 (94.3)	36.3 (97.3)	37.3 (99.1)	38.0 (100.4)	41.0 (105.8)	41.2 (106.2)	38.2 (100.8)	36.8 (98.2)	34.1 (93.4)	28.4 (83.1)	41.2 (106.2)
Mean daily maximum °C (°F)	11.4 (52.5)	14.6 (58.3)	18.2 (64.8)	24.7 (76.5)	28.7 (83.7)	31.5 (88.7)	34.7 (94.5)	33.8 (92.8)	30.1 (86.2)	25.5 (77.9)	19.9 (67.8)	13.9 (57.0)	23.9 (75.1)
Daily mean °C (°F)	7.4 (45.3)	10.1 (50.2)	13.6 (56.5)	19.7 (67.5)	23.9 (75.0)	26.9 (80.4)	29.4 (84.9)	28.4 (83.1)	25.2 (77.4)	20.5 (68.9)	14.9 (58.8)	9.2 (48.6)	19.1 (66.4)
Mean daily minimum °C (°F)	4.7 (40.5)	7.1 (44.8)	10.5 (50.9)	16.0 (60.8)	20.3 (68.5)	23.5 (74.3)	25.4 (77.7)	24.6 (76.3)	21.9 (71.4)	16.9 (62.4)	11.4 (52.5)	6.0 (42.8)	15.7 (60.2)
Record low °C (°F)	−4.0 (24.8)	−3.2 (26.2)	−1.7 (28.9)	3.7 (38.7)	10.3 (50.5)	13.7 (56.7)	18.4 (65.1)	20.4 (68.7)	13.6 (56.5)	5.2 (41.4)	−0.2 (31.6)	−6.0 (21.2)	−6.0 (21.2)
Average precipitation mm (inches)	66.1 (2.60)	86.6 (3.41)	148.3 (5.84)	148.8 (5.86)	186.2 (7.33)	234.6 (9.24)	155.1 (6.11)	187.7 (7.39)	114.6 (4.51)	70.6 (2.78)	77.1 (3.04)	49.8 (1.96)	1,525.5 (60.07)
Average precipitation days (≥ 0.1 mm)	13.5	13.2	18.6	17.0	17.7	17.2	12.6	15.5	10.9	8.6	9.8	10.1	164.7
Average snowy days	2.2	1.4	0.3	0	0	0	0	0	0	0	0	0.7	4.6
Average relative humidity (%)	80	80	81	78	79	80	72	77	79	75	78	77	78
Mean monthly sunshine hours	77.1	79.4	82.7	118.6	135.3	145.8	240.6	206.1	158.6	152.8	129.6	118.0	1,644.6
Percentage possible sunshine	23	25	22	31	32	35	57	52	43	43	40	36	37
Source: China Meteorological Administration
