= Jinshi Township, Jiangxi =

Jinshi Township 巾石乡
- Township
- Location in Jiangxi Jinshi Township (China)
- Coordinates: 26°14′48″N 114°37′32″E
- Country: People's Republic of China
- Province: Jiangxi
- Prefecture-level city: Ji'an
- County: Suichuan County
- Time zone: UTC+8 (China Standard)

Jinshi Township (simplified Chinese: 巾石乡; traditional Chinese: 巾石鄉; pinyin: Jīnshí Xiāng) is a township under the administration of Suichuan County, in Jiangxi, China. As of 2018, it has one residential community and 13 villages under its administration.

== See also ==
- List of township-level divisions of Jiangxi
