= Nanchang Hangkong University =

University in China

Nanchang Hangkong University (NCHU)
- 南昌航空大学
- Type: Public
- Established: October 1952
- Undergraduates: 19,000
- Postgraduates: 1,095
- Other students: 1,200
- Location: Nanchang, Jiangxi, China
- Campus: urban
- Website: www.nchu.edu.cn

Nanchang Hangkong University (simplified Chinese: 南昌航空大学; traditional Chinese: 南昌航空大學; pinyin: Nánchāng Hángkōng Dàxué), also known as Nanchang Aeronautics University, is located in Nanchang, the historic birthplace of the first aircraft manufactured in the People's Republic of China. This engineering-focused institution has evolved into a comprehensive multidisciplinary university. Distinguished by its specialization in aeronautics and national defense, the university operates under the joint supervision of the Jiangxi Provincial Government and the Ministry of Industry and Information Technology.

NCHU has over 1,200 professional teachers. The total number of registered students is currently 21,000, of which 19,000 are undergraduates, 1,095 are postgraduates, and over 1,200 are vocational students. NCHU gives priority to the all-around development of students as well as the quality of education and directs its efforts to teaching innovations. As a result, it has made great achievements in the cultivation of talents and its employment rate of graduate ranks first in Jiangxi Province.

== Description ==
NCHU adheres to the development of engineering advantaged discipline and aviation characteristic majors. Currently, it has 10 key disciplines in Jiangxi Province, which are Materials Processing Engineering, Measuring and Testing Technologies and Instruments, Environmental Engineering, Manufacturing Engineering of Aerospace Vehicle, Materials Science, Control Theory and Control Engineering, Optical Engineering, Ideological and Political Education, Material Physics and Chemistry and Computer Applied Technology.

One top priority discipline in Jiangxi province, which is the Manufacturing Engineering of Aerospace Vehicle.

One national defense key discipline, which is Environmental Engineering.

Nine key laboratories (research centers) at the provincial (ministerial) level, which are Key Laboratory of Nondestructive Test (Ministry of Education), Key Laboratory of Light Alloy Fabrication Science and Technology for National Defense (State Commission of Science and Technology for National Defense Industry), Key Laboratory of Aeronautical Detection and Evaluation (China Aviation Industry), Key Laboratory of Aerial Material Hot Working (China Aviation Industry), Research Center for Materials Science and Engineering in Jiangxi Province, Key University Laboratory of Corrosion and Protection in Jiangxi Province, Research Center of Testing Technology and Control Engineering in Jiangxi Province, Research Center of University Ideological and Political Theory Course Education in Jiangxi Province and Promotion Center of Rapid Prototyping Productivity in Jiangxi Province.

Three provincial key bases, which are Demonstration Cultivation Base of Cooperation by Production, Study and Research on Computing and Information Technology in Jiangxi Province, Demonstration Cultivation Base of Cooperation by Production, Study and Research on Materials Science and Technology and Research Base of Sports Culture (State Sport General Administration).

== Majors ==
The three national specialty majors offered are Metallic Materials Engineering, Instrumentation and Measurement Technology, and Electronic Information Engineering.

The twelve provincial brand majors include Metallic Materials Engineering, Instrumentation and Measurement Technology, Material Forming and Control Engineering, Environmental Engineering, Electronic Information Engineering, Mechanical Design and Manufacturing, Automation, Electronics Science and Technology, Flight Vehicle Manufacturing Engineering, Computer Science and Technology, English, and Economics.

The two National Defense Key Construction majors are Flight Vehicle Manufacturing Engineering and Optical Engineering.

The four provincial specialty majors are Environmental Engineering, Electronics Science and Technology, Flight Vehicle Manufacturing Engineering, and Computer Science and Technology.

== Teaching ==
The four provincial teaching teams include the teaching team for Metallic Materials Engineering, the teaching team for Non-Destructive Testing Technology, the teaching team for the Engineering Training Center, and the teaching team for Applied Chemistry.

At NCHU, there are also two national experimental teaching demonstration centers: the Engineering Training Center and the College Physics Experimental Teaching Demonstration Center, along with eight provincial experimental teaching demonstration centers.

NCHU actively engages in international cooperation and exchanges, maintaining long-term collaborative relationships with institutions in Japan, Canada, Ukraine, the UK, Australia, France, Finland, and South Korea. The university also regularly hosts foreign teachers and experts for teaching throughout the year.

== Awards ==
In recent years, NCHU has successively won many titles of honor, including "Unit with Significant Contribution in the 40th Anniversary of Aviation Industry Establishment", "Advanced Unit in Aviation Industry", "Advanced Unit of Cultural and Ideological Progress and Cohesion Project in Aviation Industry", "Civilized Unit in Jiangxi Province", "Advanced Grass-roots Party Organization in Jiangxi Province", "Advanced Unit in Afforestation in Jiangxi Province", "Advanced Unit in Campus Construction in Jiangxi Province", "Advanced Unit in Party Construction and Ideological And Political Work in Jiangxi Province", "National Model Staff Family" and "National Advanced Unit in Military Training".

== See also ==
- Nanchang University
