= Nanchang University Jiangxi Medical College =

- 南昌大学江西医学院 (Chinese)
- Former names: Jiangxi Medical University
- Motto: Make Efforts and Seek Truth
- Type: medical school
- Established: 1921; 105 years ago
- Chairman: Dr. Baoming Li
- Academic staff: 865 (ful-time Professors)
- Students: 12703
- Undergraduates: 8517
- Location: Nanchang, Jiangxi province, China
- Website: NCU JXMU Chinese Website

Chinese name
- Simplified Chinese: 南昌大学江西医学院
- Traditional Chinese: 南昌大學江西醫學院
Transcriptions
Standard Mandarin
- Hanyu Pinyin: Nánchāng Dàxúe Yīxúeyuàn

Alternative Chinese name
- Simplified Chinese: 南昌大学医学部
- Traditional Chinese: 南昌大學醫學部
Transcriptions
Standard Mandarin
- Hanyu Pinyin: Nánchāng Dàxué Yīxuébù

Nanchang University Jiangxi Medical College (JMC; Chinese: 南昌大学江西医学院), also known as the Faculty of Medicine, Nanchang University (Chinese: 南昌大学医学部), is the medical school of Nanchang University in Nanchang, Jiangxi province. It is a National Key University under the administration of the Jiangxi Provincial Government.

== History ==
Founded in 1921, the Faculty of Medicine of Nanchang University was originally named Jiangxi Public Medical School, which was the earliest medical school in Jiangxi Province. In 1958, the school was merged with the 8th Military Medical School of the Chinese People’s Liberation Army, and changed its name to Jiangxi Medical College. In 2005, a merger was implemented between Jiangxi Medical College and Nanchang University. Since then, the combined body has used the new name, Faculty of Medicine of Nanchang University. In its long history of development, the college has evolved a philosophy of "High Morals with Outstanding Expertise" and spirit of "strictness, diligence, solidarity, and innovation" along with profound cultural deposits.
