= East China University of Technology =

Public university in Nanchang, Jiangxi, China

- 东华理工大学
- Motto: 敦本务实，崇义奉公
- Type: Public university
- Established: 1956
- President: Sun Zhanxue
- Academic staff: c. 2,800
- Students: c. 23,000
- Location: 418 Guanglan Ave, Qingshanhu District, Nanchang, Jiangxi, 330013, China
- Website: www.ecut.edu.cn

East China University of Technology
- Simplified Chinese: 东华理工大学
- Traditional Chinese: 東華理工大學
Transcriptions
Standard Mandarin
- Hanyu Pinyin: Dōnghuá Lǐgōng Dàxué

The East China University of Technology (formerly East China Institute of Technology) (ECUT; Chinese: 东华理工大学; pinyin: Dōnghuá Lǐgōng Dàxué) is a public university located in Nanchang, Jiangxi, China. It is China's first university for nuclear industry, affiliated with the Jiangxi Provincial Government, and co-sponsored by the State Administration of Science, Technology and Industry for National Defense(SASTIND), the Ministry of Natural Resources, and the China National Nuclear Corporation(CNNC).

ECUT is the pilot university of the Outstanding Engineer Education and Training Programme of the Ministry of Education, the Plan 111 of the Ministry of Education, the Basic Capacity Building Project of Colleges and Universities in the Central and Western regions to support universities, and the New Engineering research and practise projects to be selected in colleges and universities.

The university anniversary of East China University of Technology is October 16, the date when China's first atomic bomb was successfully detonated.

== History ==
ECUT, originally established in 1956 in Shanxi Province. It started as Taigu Geological School. It belonged to State Second Mechanic Industry, a state defence institution.

It was jointly built by the People's Government of Jiangxi Province, the State Administration of National Defence Science, Technology and Industry, the Ministry of Natural Resources, and the China Nuclear Industry Corporation.

In 1958, ECUT moved to Fuzhou, Jiangxi Province due to the abundant uranium deposits, and later to Nanchang.

Presently, ECUT is jointly run by the Jiangxi Government and China Atomic Energy Association (CAEA), the Ministry of Natural Resource (MNR), China National Nuclear Corporation (CNNC).

== Curriculum ==
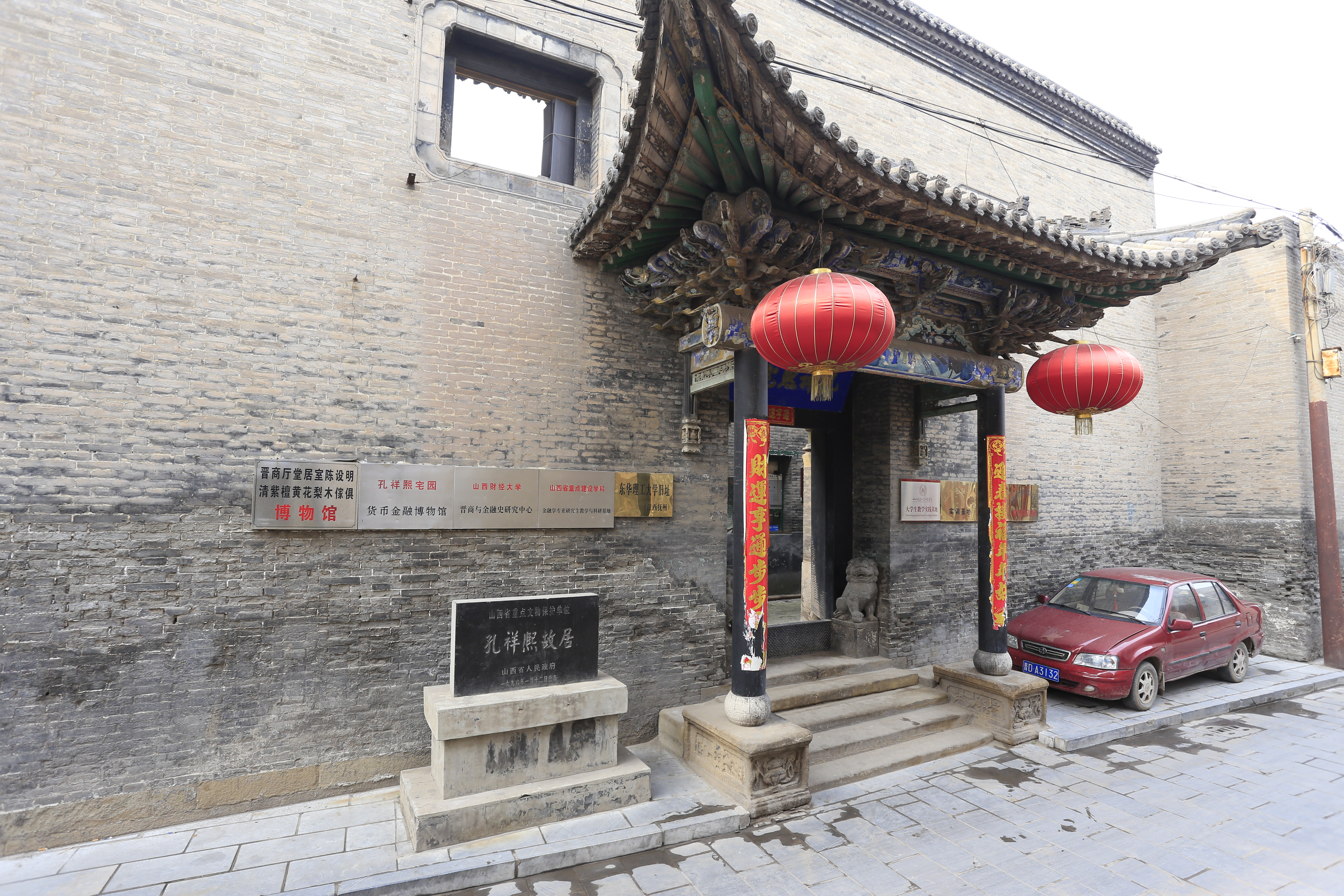
Taigu Geological School was founded in 1956 in the old residence of Kung Hsiang-hsi

From its inception, ECUT has focused on the fields of nuclear science and geoscience and expanded to engineering, science, language, economy, and arts. ECUT offers one doctoral programme, 71 master programmes, and 68 bachelor programmes. Most of these disciplines are connected to the traditional fields at ECUT, forming more than 20 schools and research centres.

Since its establishment, ECUT has focused its education and research in the field of Nuclear Science and Geology Science, with the relevant disciplines, developed gradually. Based on the featured disciplines ECUT has developed into the fields of Geological Tourism, Geological Economy, Geological Chemistry, and Geological Environment etc. So far, ECUT has extended its education and research to engineering, science, language, management, economy and arts, among which 1 doctoral programme, 71 master programmes and 72 bachelor programmes, forming more than 20 schools and research centres.

== Students and staff ==
ECUT has a team of 2,800 teachers as its full-time staff, including 123 professors. Around 23,000 students study on the campuses. ECUT enrols international students, including doctoral programmes, master programmes, and bachelor programmes.

== Leaders and notable alumni ==
- Qian Qihu (钱七虎), honorary principal
- Liu Xiaodong (刘晓东), vice principal
- Tang Bin (汤彬), vice principal
- Wang Yaonan (王耀南), academician of the Chinese Academy of Engineering(CAE)

== Faculties ==
- School of Earth Science
- School of Nuclear Science and Technology
- School of Geophysics and Measurement and Control Technology
- School of Chemistry, Biology and Material Science
- School of Water Resources and Environmental Engineering
- School of Geomatics
- School of Civil and Architectural Engineering
- School of Information Engineering
- School of Software Engineering
- School of Mechanical and Electronic Engineering
- School of Economics and Management
- School of Literature and Law
- School of Foreign Languages
- School of Science
- School of Marxism
- School of Teacher Training
- School of Physical Education
- School of Vocational Education
- School of Postgraduate Education
- Jiangxi Key Laboratory of Nuclear Resources and Environment
- Jiangxi Key Laboratory of Mass Spectrometry and Instrumentation
- International School

== Research environment ==
ECUT has more than ten national and provincial laboratories: the State Key Laboratory of Nuclear Resources and the Environment, the National Defence Key Discipline Laboratory of Radioactive Geology and Exploration Technology, the Science Ministry's International Cooperation Base of Earth Environment, the Education Ministry's Engineering Research Centre for Nuclear Technology, the Reference Laboratory of IAEA and the National Experimental Teaching Demonstration Centre for Radioactive Geology. In addition, two training centres, the Uranium Geology and Isotope Hydrology Advanced Training Centre of IAEA, and the Overseas Uranium Resources Exploration are present.

== Campus ==
ECUT has two campuses, located in Nanchang and Fuzhou. The main campus is situated in Nanchang, the capital of Jiangxi province. The other campus, approximately 80 km southeast of Nanchang, is in Fuzhou. The two campuses occupy an area of 1400 km^{2}.

== See also ==
- List of universities in China
- List of universities and colleges in Jiangxi
