= Jiangxi Science and Technology Normal University =

University in Nanchang, China

Jiangxi Science and Technology Normal University (JXSTNU; Chinese: 江西科技师范大学; pinyin: Jiāngxī Kējì Shīfàn Daxue) is a teacher training college located in Nanchang, Jiangxi Province, People’s Republic of China, and is currently the only university in Jiangxi Province to offer undergraduate degrees in occupational education. The university was first established in 1977 as the Nanchang Campus of Jiangxi Normal University and was among the first in the PRC established to educate teachers in occupational and technical specialties.

As of 2010, JXSTNU enrolled over 20,000 students and an educational staff of 1,386 including 135 full professors and 306 associate professors. The university occupied a campus of roughly 145 hectares (0.56 square miles) and included roughly 5.2 million square feet (483,900 square meters) of floor space. Students were separated into 21 academic departments and 49 baccalaureate degree programs including natural science, engineering, medicine, foreign language, history, philosophy, law, economics, management, and education.
