= Kumquat production in China =

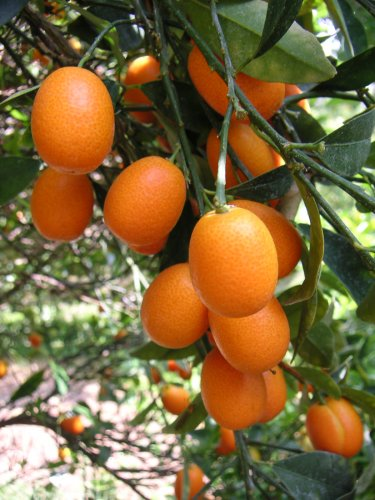
Fortunella margarita, native to China

China is one of the world's leading producers of kumquats. The earliest historical reference to kumquats appears in Chinese literature in the 12th century, and the plant was native to China before it was spread to Japan, Taiwan and South America. The industry is highly productive in Jiangxi province, particularly in Suichuan County which is first among China's four largest kumquat-producing areas. In the mid 1980s, Yufeng Township accounted for one half of the entire county's production. Many women in Jiangxi province are occupied in the kumquat industry.
