= Jinshi, Guangdong =

Jinshi 金石镇
- Town
- Location of the seat in Guangdong
- Coordinates: 23°31′43″N 116°36′54″E
- Country: People's Republic of China
- Province: Guangdong
- Prefecture-level city: Chaozhou
- District: Chao'an
- Time zone: UTC+8 (China Standard)

Jinshi (Chinese: 金石镇; pinyin: Jīnshí zhèn) is a town in Chao'an District, Chaozhou, Guangdong, China. As of 2018, it has one residential community and 21 villages under its administration.
