= Yichun University =

University in Yichun, Jiangxi, China

- Motto: Creativity, Development and Reform
- Type: Public Research University
- Established: 1958
- Affiliations: WFMS, WHO, ECFMG, EPIC, GMC
- President: Xiao Huayin
- Students: 19,000 (Including 1,400 international students)
- Location: Yichun, Jiangxi, China
- Language: English and Chinese
- Website: www.ycu.jx.cn

Yichun University
- Simplified Chinese: 宜春学院
- Traditional Chinese: 宜春學院
Transcriptions
Standard Mandarin
- Hanyu Pinyin: Yíchūn Xuéyuàn

Yichun University (Chinese: 宜春学院; pinyin: Yíchūn Xuéyuàn) an institute of higher learning is located in Yichun, Jiangxi, China.

== History ==
The provincial party committee approved Yichun University and on 10 June 1958 it was formally established. In March 1962 the province's colleges and universities adjustment of the meeting had decided to retain an area six Teachers College and the original name changed to the University Teachers College. In June 1962 Jiujiang University had withdrawn from the teachers college into the Yichun. In April 1964 the Office of the State Council of Culture and Education approved the withdrawal of Yichun Teachers College. In October 1977 the provincial party committee approved the Office of Jiangxi Normal University Yichun Branch changed to Yichun Normal School. On 25 April 1978 State Council approved the re-establishment of Yichun Teachers College. On 20 June 1986, the College upgraded to the vice-formed unit. Yichun Teachers College, Yichun Academy of Medicine merged on 25 January 2000 which is approved by Ministry of National Education.

== Faculties ==
Yichun University is made up of 11 faculties. They are:

=== School of Humanities ===
1. Chinese Department 2. Political and Moral Education Department 3. Broadcasting and Journalism Department

=== School of Science ===
1. Mathematics Department 2. Physics Department 3. Chemistry Department

=== School of Engineering ===
1. Computer and Information-Engineering Department 2. Mechanical and Electrical Automate Department 3. Civil and Architecture Department 4. Biology and Environment Department

=== School of Agriculture ===
1. Agronomy Department 2. Horticulture Department 3. Animal and Aquatic Department

=== School of Medicine ===
1. General Medicine Department-The General Medicine Department has been offering The Bachelor of Medicine and Surgery Degree in English Language since 2005. The degree is a 6-year long discipline including an internship done locally or in the students home country. The Medical School of Yichun University is listed in the I-med Faimer Directory of Medical Schools and The World Health Organizations Avicenna Directory, which makes the International Medical Students eligible for but not limited to ECFMG certification, USMLE licensing and The Zambia Medical Association Licensure among other various African and International Medical Boards 2. Preventive Medicine 3. Cosmetic Department

=== School of Business and Law ===
1. Management Department 2. Economics Department 3. Law Department

=== School of Foreign Languages Studies ===
1. English Literature

=== School of Physical education ===
1. Physical Health and Rehabilitation 2. Physical Education (public Security) 3. Physical Education

=== School of Art ===
1. Music Department 2. Fine Art

=== School of Vocational and Technical education ===
1. Foreign Languages Department 2. Medical Department 3. Computer Department 4. Economics Department 5. Art and Sports Department 6. Science and Technology Department

== Notable alumni ==
- Yang Yang, artist

== See also ==
- Jinggangshan University
- Nanchang University
