= Xinyu University =

Education organization in Xinyu, China

- 新余学院 (Chinese)
- Motto: 求新、求实、求善
- Type: Public university
- Established: 1985
- President: Zhang Yuqing
- Academic staff: 838 (2021)
- Students: ~12,000 (2021)
- Location: Jiangxi, China; 27.818199°N 114.918062°E
- Campus: Xinyu
- Colours: Red
- Website: www.xyc.edu.cn

Chinese name
- Simplified Chinese: 新余学院
- Traditional Chinese: 新余學院
Transcriptions
Standard Mandarin
- Hanyu Pinyin: Xīnyú Xuéyuàn

Xinyu University (XYU) (Chinese: 新余学院) is a public university for undergraduate education located at Xinyu, Jiangxi, China.
