= Jingdezhen Ceramic University =

University in Jingdezhen, China

- 景德镇陶瓷大学
- Former names: Jingdezhen Ceramic Institute
- Motto: 誠朴恕毅
- Type: Public
- Established: 1909 (predecessor school), 1958 (current institute)
- Students: 15,000
- Location: Jingdezhen, Jiangxi, China
- Website: http://www.jci.edu.cn

The Jingdezhen Ceramic University (Chinese: 景德镇陶瓷大学), in Jingdezhen city in the Jiangxi province of the People's Republic of China, is China's only institute of higher learning dedicated to the ceramic arts. The Jingdezhen area is historically significant in the development and production of Chinese ceramics; thus the university serves to link modern educational techniques and infrastructure with a source of ancient Chinese lore and tradition. Its prominent graduates include artists such as Jackson Li.
