= Jinshi, Dazhou =

Jinshi 金石镇
- Town
- Location of the seat in Sichuan
- Coordinates: 31°24′08″N 107°22′45″E
- Country: People's Republic of China
- Province: Sichuan
- Prefecture-level city: Dazhou
- District: Tongchuan
- Time zone: UTC+8 (China Standard)

Jinshi (Chinese: 金石镇; pinyin: Jīnshí zhèn) is a town in Tongchuan District, Dazhou, Sichuan, China. As of 2018, it has one residential community and 17 villages under its administration.
