= Jiangxi University of Traditional Chinese Medicine =

University in China for M.B.B.S. and traditional medicine course as extra

Coordinates: 28.6775°N 115.7456°E

Jiangxi University of Traditional Chinese Medicine (JXUTCM)
- 江西中医药大学
- Type: Public
- Established: 1959
- President: Prof. Fu Ke Gang
- Academic staff: 1,014
- Undergraduates: 17,000 (Including 1,400 international students)
- Postgraduates: 1,078
- Location: Nanchang, Jiangxi Province, China
- Campus: Suburban
- Website: www.jxutcm.edu.cn

Jiangxi University of Traditional Chinese Medicine (Chinese: 江西中医药大学; pinyin: Jiāngxī Zhōngyīyào Dàxué), designated as a medical university in Nanchang, Jiangxi, is an institution of higher learning under the leadership of Jiangxi provincial government.

== Brief Introduction ==
Jiangxi University of Traditional Chinese Medicine was founded in 1959 and is located in Nanchang, China. It is a higher learning institute with focus on Chinese Medicine and related disciplines. The university has four campuses, which cover a total area of 2,308 Chinese Mu (about 154 hectares). There are 120,000 full-time students. International applicants are eligible to apply for enrollment. The university also provides several academic and non-academic facilities and services to students including a library, housing, as well as administrative services.

== Campuses ==
The university has two campuses.

- Wanli
- Yanming Campus

== Main Courses ==
=== Subjects of foundation stage ===
- Anatomy
- Physiology
- Biochemistry
- Pathology
- Pharmacology
- Community Medicine
- Microbiology
- Forensic Medicine and Toxicology
- Chinese
- Introduction of China

==== Subjects of clinical stage ====
- Medicine
- Surgery
- Obstetrics and Gynecology
- Chinese
- Pediatrics
- Orthopedics
- Psychiatry
- Anesthesiology
- Ophthalmology
- Otorhinolaryngology
- Radiology
- Dermatology
- Medical Chinese
- Emergency medicine

== Teaching Staff ==
There are more than 1,400 employees (not including the Eastern Hospital).

The university hospital has more than 1,600 hospital beds. In June 2014, construction area of nearly 50,000 square meters of 26-story new medical complex was officially put into use. The hospital purchased the province's first gem energy spectrum CT, with 3.0T and 1.5T nuclear magnetic resonance, DR, color Doppler, and a large number of advanced ultrasound treatment equipment.

== Affiliated Hospitals ==
- 1st Affiliated Hospital (第一附属医院)
- 2nd Affiliated Hospital 第二附属医院)
- The Jiangxi Hospital of Heat-Sensitive Moxibustion

== 1st Affiliated Hospital ==
In the 60 years since its foundation, the First Affiliated Hospital of Jiangxi University of TCM has become a comprehensive tertiary hospital (grade 3-A) integrating medical services with teaching, research and preventive health care and rehabilitation. It serves as the center for medical care, teaching, research and health care in Jiangxi Province. The hospital has over 1300 full-time employees, 29 wards, 1600 beds, and 56 clinical and technical departments including internal medicine, surgery, gynecology, pediatrics, etc. Besides, the hospital also has some characteristic departments such as Guo Yitang (a workshop for doctors of TCM), the hospital of heat-sensitive moxibustion and a department of special therapy on TCM.

The hospital is a home to 7 national key clinical disciplines, 12 key clinical disciplines of the State Administration of TCM, 8 key disciplines of the State Administration of TCM, 13 provincial key disciplines and 2 provincial top disciplines.

== 2nd Affiliated Hospital ==
Located in the east of Nanchang, the 2nd Affiliated Hospital of Jiangxi University of TCM originated from the Hospital of Nanchang Steel Co., Ltd. (1958). It was renamed in May 2010. Now it has become a grade 2-A hospital integrating medical services with teaching, research, preventive health care and community health care.

With 270 employees, the hospital approximately takes care of 100,000 outpatients annually. In recent years, in order to get a team of young and well-trained professionals, over 40 new professionals were introduced to the hospital, and most of them have master's degrees.

The hospital has more than 20 clinical departments (emergency room, the department of cardiovasology, neurology, respiratory medicine, gastroenterology, nephrology, general surgery, orthopedics and traumatology, anorectum, neck shoulder and lumbocrural pain (NSLP), gynecology and obstetrics, pediatrics, acupuncture and rehabilitation, and ophthalmology and otorhinolaryngology, Guo Yitang, etc.) and a community health care center. Now the hospital is equipped with SCT, DR, 4D color ultrasonic, hemodialysis machine, TCT and the chromosome image analysis system. And it promotes its characteristic diagnosis and treatment of TCM on orthopedic and traumatology, acupuncture and rehabilitation, anorectal diseases and NSLP. Besides, it also builds up a new department of gynecology and obstetrics based on integrated western and traditional Chinese medicine. All in all, the hospital has been trying the best to become a public-satisfying hospital by offering qualified medical services and community health consultation to the public.

Clinical College of Medicine

Professional name: Medicine

Categories of applicants: Science and Arts

Faculty and Degree conferred: 5-year Bachelor of Medicine and Bachelor of Surgery (MBBS)

Training requirements: The students mainly study the basic theory of medicine, basic knowledge and necessary basic medicine, clinical medicine basic knowledge, basic training humanities, science, education and professionalism of clinical skills, master the use of Chinese medicine for diagnosis, prevention, Rehabilitation and population health services and other aspects of the basic ability.

Main courses: Basic Theory of TCM, Collation, TCM, pharmacy, prescriptions, Nei Jing Readings, Treatise on Readings, Golden Chamber Readings, Febrile Diseases, Anatomy, Physiology, Medical Immunology and Pathogen Biology, Pathology, pharmacology and other professional basic courses, and traditional Chinese medicine, traditional Chinese medicine surgery, traditional Chinese medicine gynecology, Chinese medicine ophthalmology, acupuncture and moxibustion, Chinese medicine pediatrics, Chinese medicine ENT science, Chinese medicine bone science, diagnostic science, internal medicine Medicine, surgery, emergency medicine, local anatomy, bone and joint imaging, Chinese medicine bone science, orthopedic surgery, traumatic first aid, Chiropractic and other direction of differentiation clinical courses.

The students can choose the direction of Chinese medicine clinical direction or the direction of differentiation of Chinese medicine according to individual wishes and interests of differentiation.

Main courses: basic theory of traditional Chinese medicine, Chinese medicine diagnostics, pharmacy, prescriptions, Nei Jing Readings, Treatise on Readings, Golden Chamber Readings, Febrile Diseases, Collation, normal human anatomy, physiology, immunology and medicine Pathogen Biology, Pathology, pharmacology and other professional basic courses, as well as diagnostic basis, integrated traditional Chinese and Western medicine, integrated traditional Chinese and Western medicine, integrated gynecology, Western medicine combined with ophthalmology, acupuncture, integrated traditional Chinese and Western medicine pediatrics, Western medicine combined with injury science, integrated Chinese and Western medicine ENT, emergency medicine and other integrated traditional Chinese and Western medicine courses.

== Publications ==
- Journal of Jiangxi University of Traditional Chinese Medicine
- Experimental Observations on the Antagonistic Effects of Coordinated Acupoints
- A New Operating System Scheduling Algorithm
