= Jiangxi University of Water Resources and Electric Power =

University in Nanchang, Jiangxi, China

Coordinates: 28.693°N 116.026°E

- 江西水利电力大学 (Chinese)
- Motto: 自强不息、格物致知
- Motto in English: Self-Discipline and Essential Investigation
- Type: Public
- Established: 1958; 68 years ago
- President: Liu Zuwen
- Party Secretary: Wang Shengqian
- Faculty: 1,600
- Students: 19,000
- Undergraduates: 18,000
- Postgraduates: 1,000
- Location: Nanchang, Jiangxi, China
- Campus: 1,304,400 square metres (14,040,000 sq ft); multiple sites
- Website: en.juwp.edu.cn

Chinese name
- Simplified Chinese: 江西水利电力大学
Transcriptions

Jiangxi University of Water Resources and Electric Power( abbr. JXUWP), formerly Nanchang Institute of Technology, is a public university in Nanchang, Jiangxi, China. The university is funded by the Jiangxi Provincial People's Government and co-funded by Ministry of Water Resources.

== History ==
It was established and known as Jiangxi Institute of Water Conservancy and Electric Power in 1958. It became Nanchang Institute of Technology in 2004 and was awarded as a pilot university for the "Excellent Engineer Education and Training Program" in 2011. It was also approved as a direct training institution for non-commissioned officers in 2013 and became a "first-class discipline" construction university in 2017. In 2018, it was selected as a national first-class professional construction university. As a significant step in the innovation and reformation aspect of the university, Yaohu Honor College was established in 2014 with the aim of further selecting undergraduate students with passionate research interest and high versatility from the university (40 out of over 4000 students). While studying in the college, students are fully exposed to interdisciplinary exploration, intensive research training and international exchange.

== Academics ==
=== Education ===
The university is dedicated to building world-class academic programs and capitalizing on the strategic opportunity of "Double First-Class". Currently there are 13 departments:

- Yaohu Honor College
- Department of Water Conservancy and Ecological Engineering
- Department of Civil and Architectural Engineering
- Department of Mechanical Engineering
- Department of Electrical Engineering
- Department of Information Engineering
- Department of Business Administration
- Department of Economics and Trade
- Department of Humanities and Arts
- Department of Science
- Department of Foreign Language
- Department of Non-commissioned Officer
- Department of Physical Education Department

==== Yaohu Honor College ====
Every year, Yaohu Honors College selects 40 exceptional students from science and engineering majors, who demonstrate academic excellence, and a keen interest in scientific research. Admission to Yaohu Honors College is rather competitive and eligible candidates must achieve excellent scores in university entrance examination (around top 10% in the province). Enrolled students in Yaohu Honors College are fully exposed to research training, interest-oriented studying and international exchange. The studying can be rather stressful and challenging when enrolled students will be comprehensively evaluated and ranked in terms of course scores, research and innovation achievement, discipline competition etc. at the end of every semester.

==== Department of Water Conservancy and Ecological Engineering ====
The department has a very strong focus on water engineering safety, efficient utilization of resources, and ecological conservation, with national-level platforms for research and development, such as the Poyang Lake Basin platform, joint engineering laboratory, and several provincial-level key laboratories and engineering research centers. Additionally, the college has established a variety of school-level research institutions and experimental centers, including the Poyang Lake Research Institute, Water Conservancy Engineering Research Center, and multiple off-campus practice training bases.

==== Department of Civil and Architectural Engineering ====
The department offers six undergraduate majors, including civil engineering with specializations in construction engineering and underground space, urban and rural planning, water supply and drainage science and engineering, engineering cost, road bridge and river crossing engineering, and architecture. The civil engineering major is a first-class characteristic major in Jiangxi Province, and is part of the Jiangxi Provincial Excellent Engineer Education and Training Program. The college has two provincial scientific research platforms, namely the "Jiangxi Water Conservancy and Civil Engineering Infrastructure Safety Key Laboratory" and the "Jiangxi Water Conservancy and Civil Engineering Special Reinforcement and Safety Monitoring Engineering Research Center." It is also home to the provincial key discipline of "Twelfth Five-Year" plan. In terms of research facilities, the college has geotechnical engineering laboratories, building materials laboratories, construction engineering training bases, computing and drawing computer rooms, road and bridge engineering laboratories, structural engineering laboratories, water supply and drainage experiment centers, project cost laboratories, and a BIM engineering center.

== Ranking ==
By 2023, Nanchang Institute of Technology (NIT) ranked 733rd among Asia universities by Edurank. In terms of three majors: water conservancy and hydropower engineering, hydrology and water resources engineering, and soil and water conservation and desertification control, it ranked 1st in the country by Chinese university ranking (CUAA).
