= Jinshi, Santai County =

Jinshi 金石镇
- Town
- Location of the seat in Sichuan
- Coordinates: 31°8′48″N 104°46′47″E
- Country: People's Republic of China
- Province: Sichuan
- Prefecture-level city: Mianyang
- County: Santai County
- Time zone: UTC+8 (China Standard)

Jinshi (Chinese: 金石镇; pinyin: Jīnshí zhèn) is a town in Santai County, Sichuan, China. As of 2018, it has one residential community and 21 villages under its administration.
