= East China Jiaotong University =

University in Nanchang, China

- 华东交通大学
- Motto: 日新其德，止于至善
- Type: Public
- Established: 1971; 55 years ago
- President: Xu Changjie
- Academic staff: c. 1,600
- Location: Nanchang, Jiangxi, China
- Website: www.ecjtu.jx.cn

East China Jiaotong University
- Simplified Chinese: 华东交通大学
- Traditional Chinese: 華東交通大學
Transcriptions
Standard Mandarin
- Hanyu Pinyin: Huádōng Jiāotōng Dàxué

East China Jiaotong University (Chinese: 华东交通大学; abbreviated ECJTU) is a university in Nanchang, Jiangxi province, China. It was formerly known as Shanghai Railway Institute, which was moved from Shanghai to Nanchang in 1971.

ECJTU is one of the renowned multi-disciplinary and comprehensive universities in China, focuses on railway-related disciplines, and features transportation engineering. It was established in 1971, when the State Council approved the combining of both the College of Locomotive and Rolling Stock in Shanghai and the Jiaotong University and College of Railway Engineering in Tongji University to establish Shanghai Railway Institute, which was later renamed East China Jiaotong University and transferred to Jiangxi Province. Since 1978, ECJTU and Shanghai Railway Institute ran independently as two universities, and then was affiliated to the Railway Ministry of China. In 2000, the university was reformed to be "co-sponsored by both central and provincial governments, but mainly under the administration of the latter". Through many years' unremitting efforts, under priority construction in Jiangxi Province, ECJTU has grown into a provincially key university and one nationally accredited institution offering doctoral degree programs.

ECJTU is located in Nanchang, the capital of Jiangxi Province, China.

== History ==
ECJTU offers a complete range of disciplines, including science, engineering, economics, management, literature, law, education, art, etc. ECJTU is composed of 17 schools, offering 2 doctoral programs of the first-rank disciplines, 17 master's programs of the first-rank disciplines, and over 60 undergraduate programs, among which there are 4 undergraduate majors granted as the National Feature Specialty and 3 national level excellent engineers experimental majors. The university owns a national level college students practice base, a national level CAD application engineering training base, and a national level intellectual property training (Jiangxi) base. It was also accredited to confer the following professional postgraduate degrees: Master of Business Administration (MBA), Master of Engineering, Master of Applied Statistics, Master of Accounting, Master of Physical Education, and Master of Translation and Interpreting (MTI). Also, ECJTU is qualified to recommend graduates to study for master's degrees without taking examinations. At present, the university has more than 23,000 registered students, 1700 staff and faculty members, including more than 530 professors and associate professors. The university boasts over 80 members respectively nominated or selected as candidates of "the New Century Hundred, Thousand and Ten-Thousand Talent Project" and "National Excellent Teachers" at the state level, "the Program for New Century Excellent Talents" of the Ministry of Education, "Young and Middle-aged Leading Talents in Science Technology" of the Ministry of Science and Technology, talents enjoying special allowance of the Chinese State Council, and provincially distinguished professors of "Jingangshan Scholars", etc.

ECJTU has always been undertaking talents cultivation as the fundamental task, forming an integrated talent cultivation system covering bachelor, master, and doctoral degrees. In 2015, the university carried out a reform and practice in terms of cultivating an interactive network of comprehensive talents at the basic level, which won the Second Class Prize of the National Level Teaching Achievement Award. Meanwhile, its national defense students' cultivation mode is approved as National Experimental Zones for Innovating Talents Cultivation, which is popularized by the Ministry of Education and the General Political Department across universities nationwide. ECJTU takes the lead in China in exploring and practicing a five-year, double-major interdisciplinary talents cultivation mode as "musicology plus secretary". It also has "Software engineering plus application background majors", along with the establishment of a scientific and technological business incubation garden for college students, was also the first bold try in Jiangxi province, which realized an effective interaction between talents cultivation and employment supply and demand. In 2015, ECJTU took the lead in reform and started to apply academic credit system in all majors. The university maintains a high social recognition for its high-quality talents, and a leading graduate employment rate which has topped the list in Jiangxi Province for 10 successive years. The outstanding performance in graduate employment work won ECJTU the title of Advanced Unit in Graduate Employment Work among ordinary universities nationwide, and also the award of the "Top 50 Universities in Employment", which enables the university to conduct admission in 26 provinces by an enrollment standard for the first batch universities in China. Aiming at talents cultivation quality, ECJTU will firstly carry out the complete credit system among the provincial universities in 2015. It has successfully cultivated a large number of outstanding graduates, such as Xu Gang, who was the first student in Jiangxi entitled the Chinese Excellent University Students of the Year, Zhang Hailong, the Chinese Model Students of Self-Improvement, and Ouyang Zili, the National Positive and Kind-Hearted Youth.

ECJTU has always been pursuing a higher level for scientific research and technological innovation. There are 21 science and technology innovation and think-tank platforms of provincially or ministerial level settling in the university, including Centers for Post-doctoral Studies, Engineering Research Centers, and Key Laboratories of the Ministry of Education, National Experimental Zones for Innovating Talents Cultivation, Academician Workstations, 2011 Provincial Collaborative Innovation Center, etc., which have cultivated not only the first winner of the First Class Prize in Humanities and Social Sciences of the Ministry of Education in Jiangxi Province, but also plenty of talents who have won various science and technology awards of provincial or ministerial levels, such as the First Class Prize and the Second Class Prize of National Science and Technology Progress Award. In the past three years, the university has obtained nearly 40 scientific research achievement awards of provincial level or above, undertaken over 1,500 research projects of all levels, among which more than 600 are provincial or ministerial level projects, such as National 863 Plan, National 973 Plan, National Science Fund, international cooperation projects under the Ministry of Science and so on. Staff in ECJTU has in all published in domestic and foreign academic journals more than 3,200 academic papers, among which over 1,000 are indexed by SCI, EI, and ISTP. The university has also been granted over 40 patents of invention and 50 patents of utility models. There were more than 220 monographs and textbooks that were published in the past 3 years.

With an equal importance attached to humanities and science, ECJTU lays its emphasis on promoting the humanistic quality of students in order to construct a humanistic campus soaked in a harmonious blend of humanities and science. The university has been awarded the title of Advanced Unit in Comprehensive Administration of Social Management for eleven consecutive years, holding the top title for the longest time compared with any university in Jiangxi Province. It takes the leading rank in Jiangxi Province in the field of mental health education, with the settlement of province's university psychological quality development and training center and the counseling center of adolescent mental health education. Thus, it has been appraised and selected as an advanced unit for national college students' psychological health education. The university also takes the lead in running the Kongmu Lake Forum, praised as the campus version of "Lecture Room"—a CCTV program. The university still coordinates national fitness and competitive sports quite well and harvests fruitful achievements in sports, as the tennis team, track and field team, and Wushu team have repeatedly won gold medals in major sports events of national and international level. China's first Marathon World Champion Bai Xue and Men's Triple Jump Champion Cao Shuo in the Inchon Asian games are graduates of ECJTU.

The university lays great emphasis on international cooperation in education. It owns the right to recruit oversea students and has established multi-level cooperative relationships with more than 50 foreign universities and research institutions such as the University of North Carolina, St Petersburg National University of Transportation, and so on. They carried out various forms of cooperation in education, project research and development, course connection, credits transfer, and exchange program for teachers and students. Several double-degree cooperation modes such as 1 + 2 + 1, 2 + 2, 3 + 1, or 3 + 2 are carried forward to meet different needs of oversea students, thus conform to international practices in both course teaching and management. In recent years, ECJTU has successfully held the "International Symposium on Innovation & Sustainability of Modern Railway" four times, during which the first international scientific research project in Jiangxi Province was signed, along with the introduction of a series of international talents cultivation programs in disciplines such as international finance, and the admission of foreign students to pursue doctoral degrees in ECJTU.

The fifth Party Congress in the university, successfully held recently, has approved mid-term and long-term plans for the university, which symbolizes a start of a new journey for a second round of undertaking in order to fulfill the "Century-Old University Dream". Adhering to its motto of "Daily Renewal of Virtues, Relentless Pursuit of Perfection", the university will exert itself for tens of years under an opening atmosphere. By insisting on emancipating the mind, real practice, and solid work, we are endeavoring to build a nationally renowned Jiaotong university with distinctive features and prominent advantages, setting sails for the fulfillment of the "Century-Old University Dream".
