= Nanchang University =

Provincial public university in Nanchang, Jiangxi, China

- 南昌大学
- Motto: 格物致新, 厚德泽人
- Type: Public university Research university
- Established: 1921; 105 years ago
- Affiliations: Double First-Class Construction; 211 Project; National Alliance of High-level Local Universities (NAHLU)
- President: Prof. Chen Yeguang
- Academic staff: 4,624 (including 1,556 associate and full professors)
- Students: 50,193 (including 1,400 international students) (2018/2019)
- Undergraduates: 35,213 (2018/2019)
- Postgraduates: 14,980 (2018/2019)
- Location: Nanchang, Jiangxi, China
- Website: ncu.edu.cn

Chinese name
- Simplified Chinese: 南昌大学
- Traditional Chinese: 南昌大學
Transcriptions
Standard Mandarin
- Hanyu Pinyin: Nánchāng Dàxué

Nanchang University (NCU; 南昌大学) is a provincial public university in Nanchang, Jiangxi, China. It is affiliated with the Province of Jiangxi, and co-sponsored by the Jiangxi Provincial People's Government and the Ministry of Education of China. The university is part of Project 211 and the Double First-Class Construction.

== History ==
The history of the university can be traced back to Jiangxi Public Medical School established in 1921, National Chung-Cheng Medical College established in 1937, National Chung-Cheng University established in 1940, Jiangxi University established in 1958, and Jiangxi Polytechnic College established in 1958. The large and most important merger happened in 1993 when Jiangxi University (1958-1993) and Jiangxi Polytechnic University (1958-1993) were merged and renamed as Nanchang University (NCU). In 1997, NCU was selected to "Project 211" by the Ministry of Education, and has always been listed in the top 100 national key universities in mainland China. In the year of 2004, the agreement on jointly developing NCU was signed by the Government of Jiangxi Province and the Ministry of Education. Later, Jiangxi Medical College was merged into NCU as "Faculty of Medicine" in 2005, but it retained the name of Jiangxi Medical College.

== Campus ==
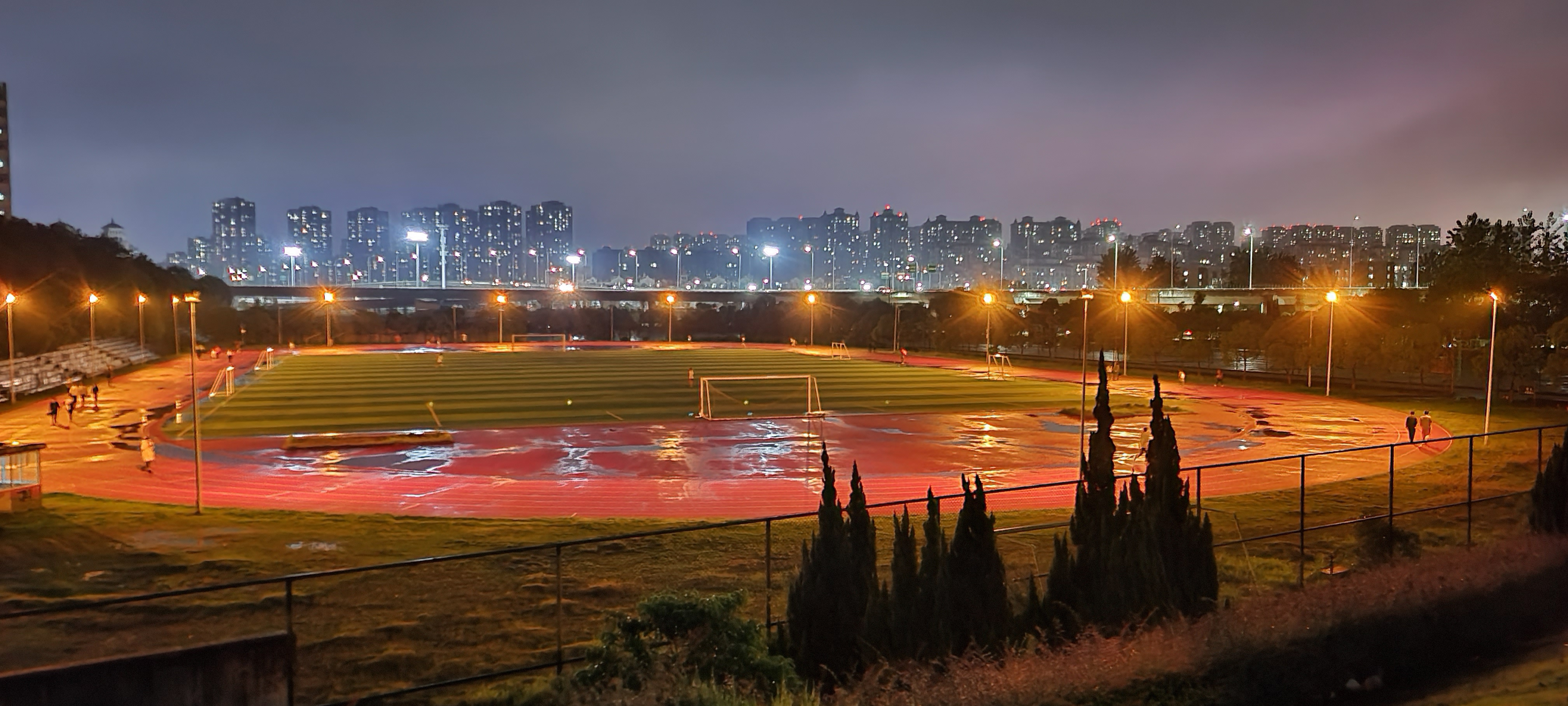

Since several institutional merges happened previously, the university is currently composed of four campuses. Its main campus - Qianhu Campus is located in Nanchang, the capital city of Jiangxi Province. The main campus occupies an area of 300 hectares and is home to all of its undergraduate students, most graduate students, most research institutes and labs, and most faculty and staff.

== Academics ==
=== Programmes ===
The university offers more than 82 undergraduate programmes out of 12 Chinese academic disciplines including Philosophy, Economics, Law, Education, Literature, History, Science, Engineering, Agriculture, Medicine, Management, and Arts. These undergraduate programmes have an enrollment of more than 35,000 full-time students.

The university also offers various graduate programmes which are being administrated by Graduate School. Currently, there are more than 20 PhD/MD programmes and 175 Master's programmes with a student body of nearly 15,000.

There are currently 8 post-doctoral programmes approved by the Ministry of Education including material science and engineering, food science and engineering, mechanical engineering, clinical medicine, environmental science and engineering, biology, management science and engineering, chemical engineering and technology.

Joint programmes are also offered together by the university and other collaborative institutions from abroad. Here is the link for accessing exchange programmes that have been established:

=== Faculties and Schools ===
Currently, NCU hosts the Graduate School and five major faculties including:

Faculty of Humanities

 School of Humanities
 School of Journalism and Communication
 School of Foreign Languages
 School of Art and Design

Faculty of Social Sciences

 School of Law
 School of Public Policy and Management
 School of Marxism
 School of Economics and Management
 School of Tourism Studies
 School of Sports and Physical Education
 School of Management

Faculty of Science & Technology (Division I)

 School of Material Science and Technology
 School of Sciences(mathematics, chemistry, physics etc.)
 School of Mechanical Engineering
 School of Information Science and Technology
 School of Software

Faculty of Science & Technology (Division II)

 School of Food Science and Technology
 School of Life Sciences
 School of Civil Engineering and Architecture
 School of Environmental Science and Chemical Engineering

Jiangxi Medical College, also internally recognized as Faculty of Medicine

 School of Basic Medical Sciences
 School of Public Health
 School of Pharmacy
 School of Nursing
 School of Dentistry (Jiangxi Dental Hospital;
 School of Ophthalmology & Optometry
 The First Clinical Medical School (The First Affiliated Hospital of Nanchang University; 
 The Second Clinical Medical School (The Second Affiliated Hospital of Nanchang University; 
 The Third Clinical Medical School (The Third Affiliated Hospital of Nanchang University; 
 The Fourth Clinical Medical School (The Fourth Affiliated Hospital of Nanchang University;
 Joint Programme in Biomedical Sciences (Jointly offered by Queen Mary University of London & Jiangxi Medical College)
 Center for Laboratory Animal Science

=== Research ===
NCU is a public research university where most of research activities are being conducted in Qianhu Campus and Qingshanhu Campus. With varying funding sources from National Natural Science Foundation of China, National Social Science Fund of China, the Ministry of Education, the Ministry of Science and Technology, Jiangxi Provincial Department of Education, and Jiangxi Provincial Department of Science and Technology, NCU has established and is operating more than 50 national and provincial key laboratories and research centers, and 60 basic training centers and professional labs. In addition, Jiangxi Medical College has a strong research orientation with tight collaboration with its 13 highly ranked affiliated hospitals throughout the province. These hospitals serve as primary teaching hospitals for the students of Jiangxi Medical College.

World-class Disciplines (sponsored by Double First Class University Plan of the Ministry of Education):

   Material Science and Technology

National Key Disciplines:

   Food Science, Materials Physics and Chemistry

National Key Disciplines (incubation):

   Materials Process Engineering

National Key Clinical Specialties:

   Gastroenterology, Neurology, Cardiology, Critical Care Medicine, Respiratory Medicine, Burn Surgery, Pain Medicine, Emergency Medicine, Vascular Surgery

Top 1% Disciplines in the World by Essential Science Indicators (ESI):

   Chemistry, Clinical Medicine, Agricultural Science (including Food Science), Engineering, Material Science, Pharmacology and Toxicology

Representative Research Clusters of Excellence:

   State Key Laboratory of Food Science and Technology (NCU branch) 
   National Engineering Research Center of Silicon-based Light Emitting Diode 
   National Engineering Research Center of Bioengineering Drugs and the Technologies
   National Engineering Research Center of Efficient Biotransformation Technology for Agricultural Products
   Ministry of Education Key Laboratory of Environment and Resource Utilization of Poyang Lake
   Institute for Advanced Study 
   Institute of Life Science 
   Institute of Translational Medicine
   Human Aging Research Institute 
   Institute of Space Science and Technology

== Rankings ==
  Global
  Rank #201-300 in 2024 Academic Ranking of World Universities (also known as "Shanghai Ranking")[1]
  Rank #451 in 2025 World University Rankings by Center for World University Rankings (CWUR)[2]
  Rank #537 in 2025 U.S. News & World Report Best Global University Ranking[3]

  China (mainland)
  The university has been commonly ranked top 100 out of nearly 3,000 institutions in the nation in most of local and international rankings.[4][3][5]

  Jiangxi Province
  Rank #1 in all regional rankings[5]

== Academic staff ==
The university employs 4,624 academic staff including 1,556 associate and full professors. A number of them have received awards for their excellence in teaching and research from various government agencies ranging from the Ministry of Education, the Ministry of Health, the Ministry of Science and Technology, and the Jiangxi Provincial Government: 5 academicians of the Chinese Academy of Sciences and the Chinese Academy of Engineering, 1 foreign academician, 4 recipients of the National Natural Science Fund for Distinguished Young Scholars, 5 members of Yangtze Scholars Scheme, 1 member of Discipline Evaluation Group of the Academic Degrees Committee of the State Council, 5 National Young and Middle-aged Experts with Outstanding Contributions, 1 outstanding expert selected by Ministry of Health, 1 National Prominent Teacher, 2 winners of Bethune Award, 5 members of first and second level of the National Hundred, Thousand and Ten Thousand Talents Project, 3 recipients of the National Thousand Talents Project, 10 members of New Century Excellent Talents Support Project, 4 exclusively employed members of Jinggang Scholars Project, 93 recipients of special allowances provided by State Council and provincial government.

== Facilities and resources ==
The university has a comprehensive library network with a collection of 2.65 million books and 1338 periodicals including foreign language journals and magazines. The library boasts a collection of 61,400 rare books and 93,000 books in foreign languages. The library has over 1 million e-books and 34 subscribed databases and online libraries including EI, INSPEC, ISTP, SCI, AIP/APS, ELSEVIER, and PQDD, among others. With the abundance of e-books, subscribed online libraries, multimedia CDs and interactive videos and teaching materials, NCU students and teachers have a wide variety of resources to suit their needs for study and research.

To enhance the hands-on experience of students, the university has nine large-scale multi-purpose labs for practical training. Their areas include electronics, physics, biology, computing, networking, chemistry, engineering, mechanics, and linguistics. The university also has 47 professional research labs and 216 internship bases.

== Technology transfer ==
To further facilitate technology transfer, the university operates the University Science Park for more than 100 startups. In 2004, this incubator was recognized as “The National University Science Park”. More recently, the university has established School of Innovation & Entrepreneurship for providing trainings and workshops to students and professors for establishing startups and gaining skills of management and operation.

Representative startups from the university

   ZTE Software Technology (Nanchang) Co., Ltd. was established in 2005 is a joint venture between NCU and ZTE, the nation's leading manufacturer of communication equipment.
   Lattice Power (Jiangxi) Co., Ltd. established in 2006 is the world-leading manufacturer of silicon-based LED products; it is the efforts from Prof. Fengyi JIANG's research team (winners of First Class of State Technological Invention Award in 2015).
   Kuangda Biotechnology (Nanchang) Co., Ltd. established in 2009 is the world-leading manufacturer of lactic acid bacteria-fermented vegetable beverages; it is the efforts from Prof. Tao XIONG and Prof. Mingyong XIE (winners of Second Class of State Science and Technology Progress Award 2016).

== International exchange & affairs ==
The university places great emphasis on international exchange. It has established regular exchange programmes with more than 30 universities and institutions from over 20 countries worldwide. The Confucius Institute at Université de Poitiers in France was the first one in France and the second one in Europe. Another two Confucius Institute were established with Universidad de Castilla-La Mancha in Spain and Hasanuddin University in Indonesia.

The university has a long-term relationship with the University of Abertay Dundee of the U.K. in jointly educating master's degree students, i.e., every year a group of undergraduates from School of Software are admitted to Abertay Dundee for pursuing their master's degrees in computer science. In the summer of 2012, the university and Queen Mary University of London decided to establish a joint programme in biomedical sciences. There are other programmes with universities from Ireland, Germany, USA, New Zealand, Australia, Japan, South Korea, Thailand, and other countries and regions.

The university has established International Education Center (also named as International Exchange College; as the primary administrative body for overall management of international students; such administration includes admission, accommodation, language testing (Chinese Proficiency Test - HSK), academic progress and examinations, and quality assurance in respect of trainings for international students.

NCU International Affairs Department assists local students and academic staffs of the university on any international activities, governs international students managed by International Exchange College, and also works on any intents from foreign institutions to collaborate with the university for establishing joint academic programs, or schools/departments/centers.

== See also ==
- Double First Class University Plan
- Project 211
- List of universities in China
- List of universities and colleges in Jiangxi
