= Jiangxi Normal University =

University in Nanchang, China

- 江西师范大学 (Chinese)
- Established: 1940; 86 years ago
- President: Guoping Mei
- Undergraduates: 30,692
- Postgraduates: 5,793
- Location: Nanchang, Jiangxi, China
- Website: www.jxnu.edu.cn

Chinese name
- Simplified Chinese: 江西师范大学
- Traditional Chinese: 江西師範大學
Transcriptions
Standard Mandarin
- Hanyu Pinyin: Jiāngxī Shīfàn Dàxué

Jiangxi Normal University (JXNU; Chinese: 江西师范大学) is situated in Nanchang, capital city of Jiangxi Province, China. It is co-sponsored by the Ministry of Education and the Jiangxi Provincial Government. It is listed in the Midwest University Fundamental Capacity Building Project. JXNU offers degrees in Literature, History, Philosophy, Economics, Management Science, Law, Natural Science, Engineering, Education, and Art. The university is quite influential in the political, economic, cultural and social development of Jiangxi Province. It is designated as a key local (teacher-training oriented) university enjoying priority in development.

There are 22 colleges under the university, in addition to an independent college (College of Science and Technology). JXNU consists of two campuses, i.e., Yaohu Lake Campus and Qingshan Lake Campus, with a total area of 233 hectares. The university library possesses 3.04 million volumes of hardcopy literature and 3 million volumes of e-books.

Jiangxi Normal University was ranked 125th in the Best Chinese Universities Ranking.

== History ==
The inspiration of establishing the university was derived from The White Deer Grotto Academy in Mount Lu, Jiujiang, its first principle was Hu Xiansu.

- 1940: First founded as National Chung Cheng University
- 1949: Renamed National Nanchang University
- 1953: Renamed Jiangxi Teachers College
- 1983: Renamed Jiangxi Normal University
- 2003: Merged with Jiangxi Worker's University of Finance (Jiangxi Banking School)

== Education ideology ==
=== School Motto ===
- Ponder Prudently and Practice Earnestly, Be Impartial and Upright

=== School Tradition ===
- Be United and Diligent, Seek Truth and Make Innovations

=== Development Philosophy ===
- Establish the university with quality, talents, innovations, culture and harmony

=== School Spirit ===
- Be Patriotic and Glorify the University, Democracy and Harmony, Be Realistic and Pragmatic, Be open minded and Innovative

== Discipline development ==
The university possesses 5 Postdoctoral Workstations, and offers 9 doctoral degree programs of first-level disciplines, 63 doctoral degrees programs of second-level disciplines, 30 master's-degree programs of first-level disciplines, 16 professional master's-degree programs and 87 bachelor's-degree programs. Its disciplines of chemistry, is rated among the world's 1% disciplines by ESI.

== Faculty and staff ==
JXNU has over 2,600 faculty and administrative staff members on its payroll, including over 1,700 full-time teachers, over 700 doctoral degree holders. 22.16% of the faculty members are 35 years old or less; 53.73% attain senior academic rank; 84.67% hold Master's or higher degrees.

== International collaboration ==
The university has established friendship ties with over 60 universities in 17 countries or regions and signed mutual credit-recognition, or faculty & student exchange agreements with 28 overseas universities. The university works with a dozen domestic and overseas research teams or institutes in key laboratory operations. To date, JXNU undertakes two Confucius Institutes, Confucius Institute at the University of Antananarivo, Madagascar was conferred the title of "Model Confucius Institute". Over 30 foreign teachers work in the university. JXNU is a host institution of the Chinese Government Scholarship, the Confucius Institute Scholarship and the Jiangxi Provincial Government Scholarship for international students. JXNU provides university scholarship for international students as well. Every year, over 400 international students from more than 40 countries study in the university.

== Rankings and reputation ==
According to the Chinese university ranking of outstanding politician alumni published by Chinese alumni network, JXNU ranks 78th. It ranks 126th in the Chinese university ranking of billionaire alumni published by the above network.

== Alumni ==
For over 70 years, JXNU has produced over 300,000 talents who exhibit excellence in all walks of life and a lot of them have become backbone of their industries. Among the primary and secondary school teachers in Jiangxi Province, about 50 percent of the super rank teachers, over 60 percent of the core teachers, in particular, over 80 percent of the super rank senior middle school teachers are alumni of JXNU. Other alumni include professionals, entrepreneurs and statesmen.
