= Jiangxi =

Province in eastern China

Jiangxi 江西 Kiangsi
- Province

Name transcription(s)
  - Chinese: 江西省 (Jiāngxī Shěng)
  - Abbreviation: JX / 赣 (pinyin: Gàn; Gan: Kōm)
  - Gan: Kongsi
  - Hakka Pinyim: Gong^{1} Si^{1} Sen^{3}
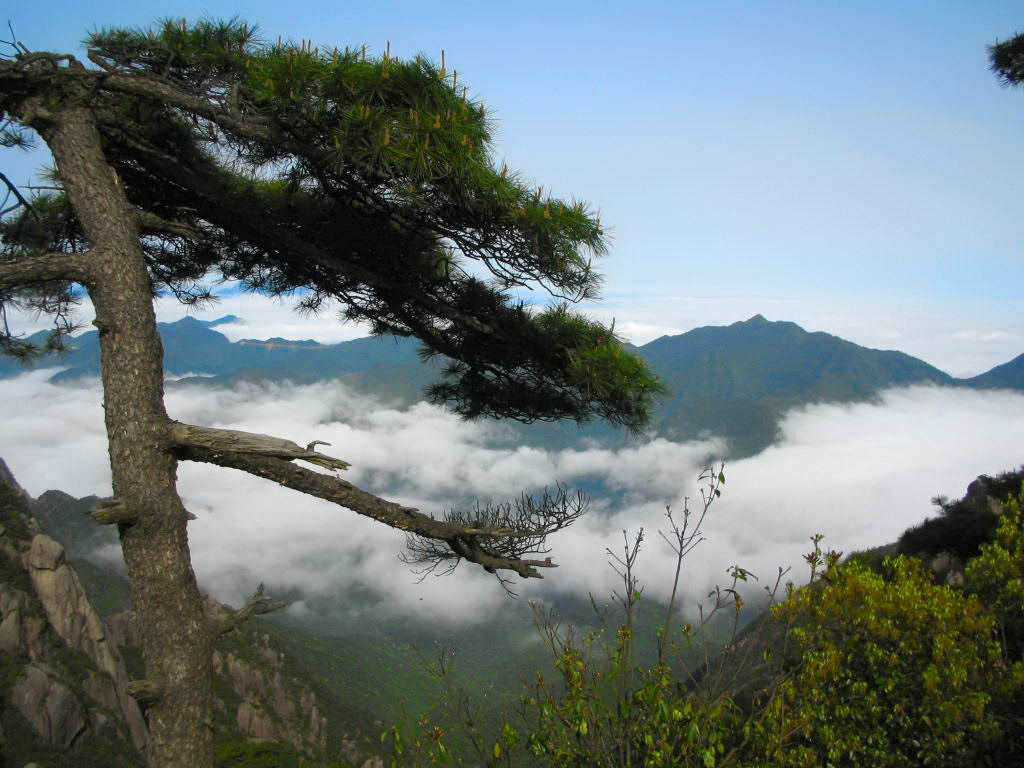
- Mount Lu

- Location of Jiangxi in China
- Coordinates: 27°18′N 116°00′E
- Country: China
- Named for: Jiangnanxi Circuit (江南西道)
- Capital: Nanchang
- Largest city: Ganzhou
- Divisions: 11 prefectures, 99 counties, 1549 townships

Government
  - Type: Province
  - Body: Jiangxi Provincial People's Congress
  - Party Secretary: Yin Hong
  - Congress chairman: Yin Hong
  - Governor: Chen Yongqi (acting)
  - CPPCC chairman: Song Fulong
  - National People's Congress Representation: 81 deputies

Area
  - Total: 166,919 km^{2} (64,448 sq mi)
  - Rank: 18th
- Highest elevation (Mt. Huanggang): 2,158 m (7,080 ft)

Population (2020)
  - Total: 45,188,635
  - Rank: 13th
  - Density: 270.722/km^{2} (701.167/sq mi)
  - Rank: 16th

Demographics
  - Ethnic composition: Han – 99.7%; She – 0.2%
  - Languages and dialects: Gan, Hakka, Huizhou, Wu, Jianghuai Mandarin

GDP (2024)
  - Total: CN¥3.42 trillion (15th; US$480.26 billion)
  - Per capita: CN¥75,862 (21st; US$10,652)
- ISO 3166 code: CN-JX
- HDI (2023): 0.777 (19th) – high
- Website: jiangxi.gov.cn

Jiangxi
- "Jiangxi" in Chinese characters
- Chinese: 江西
- Gan: Kong si
- Postal: Kiangsi
- Literal meaning: "Western Jiangnan"
Transcriptions
Standard Mandarin
- Hanyu Pinyin: Jiāngxī
- Bopomofo: ㄐㄧㄤ ㄒㄧ
- Gwoyeu Romatzyh: Jiangshi
- Wade–Giles: Chiang^{1}-hsi^{1}
- IPA: [tɕjáŋ.ɕí]
Wu
- Romanization: Kaon^{平}si^{平}
Gan
- Romanization: Kong si
Yue: Cantonese
- Yale Romanization: Gōng-sāi
- Jyutping: Gong^{1}-sai^{1}
- IPA: [kɔŋ˥.sɐj˥]
Southern Min
- Tâi-lô: Kang-sai

Jiangxi (Note: /dʒæŋˈʃiː, dʒiɒŋ-/; 江西; formerly romanized as Kiangsi or Chianghsi) is an inland province in east China. Spanning from the banks of the Yangtze river in the north into hillier areas in the south and east, it borders Anhui to the north, Zhejiang to the northeast, Fujian to the east, Guangdong to the south, Hunan to the west, and Hubei to the northwest. Major prefecture cities include its capital Nanchang, Ganzhou, and Jiujiang.

Jiangxi was one of the earliest Communist bases in China. The Nanchang uprising took place in Jiangxi on 1 August 1927, beginning the Chinese Civil War. In 1931, the Chinese Soviet Republic's government was established in Ruijin, which is sometimes called the "Former Red Capital". (Note: 红色故都, Gan Chinese: Fūng-set Kū-tu)

The southern half of Jiangxi is hilly and mountainous, with ranges and valleys interspersed; notable mountains and mountain ranges include Mount Lu, the Jinggang Mountains and Mount Sanqing. The northern half is comparatively lower in altitude. The Gan River flows through the province.

Although the majority of Jiangxi's population is Han Chinese, Jiangxi is linguistically diverse. It is considered the center of Gan Chinese; Hakka Chinese is also spoken to some degree. Jiangxi is rich in mineral resources, leading the provinces of China in deposits of copper, tungsten, gold, silver, uranium, thorium, tantalum, niobium and lithium.

== History ==
Jiangxi is centered on the Gan River valley, which historically provided the main north–south transport route of south China. The corridor along the Gan River is one of the few easily traveled routes through the otherwise mountainous and rugged terrain of the south-eastern mountains. This open corridor was the primary route for trade and communication between the North China Plain and the Yangtze River valley in the north and the territory of modern Guangdong province in the south. As a result, Jiangxi has been strategically important throughout much of China's history.

Jiangxi was outside the sphere of influence of early Chinese civilization during the Shang dynasty (16th to 11th centuries BC). It is likely that peoples collectively known as the Baiyue inhabited the region. During the Spring and Autumn period, the northern part of modern Jiangxi formed the western frontier of the state of Wu. After Wu was conquered by the state of Yue (a power based in modern northern Zhejiang) in 473 BC, the state of Chu (based in modern Hubei) took over northern Jiangxi and there may have been some Yue influence in the south. Chu subjugated Yue in 333 BC. In 223 BC, when Qin conquered Chu, a majority of the Jiangxi area was recorded to be put under Jiujiang Commandery situated in Shouchun (壽春). However the commandery was ineffective and ended shortly when Qin falls.

Yuzhang Commandery (豫章, Gan: Ì-zong) was established in Jiangxi at the beginning of the Han dynasty, possibly before the death of Xiang Yu in 202 BC, and it was also the first commandery set up by Chinese dynasty in Jiangxi. It was named after the Yuzhang River (豫章江, Gan: Ì-zong Kong), the original name of Gan River. "Gan" has become the abbreviation of the province. In 201, eight counties were added to the original seven of Qin, and three more were established in later years. Throughout most of the Han dynasty the commandery's eighteen counties covered most of the modern province of Jiangxi. The county seats of Nanchang, Gan, Yudu, Luling among others were located at the sites of modern major cities. Other counties, however, have been moved or abolished in later centuries.

Under the reign of Emperor Wu of the Han dynasty, Yuzhang Commandery was assigned to Yangzhou Province, as part of a trend to establish provinces (zhou) all across China. In 291 AD, during the Western Jin dynasty, Jiangxi became its own Zhou called Jiangzhou (江州, Gan: Kong-chiu). During the Southern and Northern Dynasties, Jiangxi was under the control of the southern dynasties, and the number of zhou slowly grew.

During the Sui dynasty, there were seven commanderies and twenty-four counties in Jiangxi. During the Tang dynasty, another commandery and fourteen counties were added. Commanderies were then abolished, becoming zhou (henceforth translated as "prefectures" rather than "provinces").

Circuits were established during the Tang dynasty as a new top-level administrative division. At first Jiangxi was part of the Jiangnan Circuit (lit. "Circuit south of the Yangtze"). In 733, this circuit was divided into western and eastern halves. Jiangxi was found in the western half, which was called Jiangnanxi Circuit (lit. "Western circuits south of the Yangtze"). This is the source of the modern name "Jiangxi".

The Tang dynasty collapsed in 907, heralding the division of the Five Dynasties and Ten Kingdoms period. Jiangxi first belonged to Wu (吳, Gan: Ng), then to Southern Tang (南唐, Gan: Nām-thóng). Both states were based in modern-day Nanjing, further down the Yangtze River.

After the ten Chinese kingdoms, Jiangnanxi Circuit was reestablished with nine prefectures and four army districts (with sixty-eight districts). Jiangxi was later divided into thirteen different circuits, and Jiangxi Province was established for the first time. This province also included the majority of modern Guangdong. Jiangxi acquired (more or less) its modern borders.

After the fall of the Qing regime, Jiangxi became one of the earliest bases for the Communists and many peasants were recruited to join the growing people's revolution. The Nanchang Uprising took place in Jiangxi on 1 August 1927, during the Chinese Civil War. Later the Communist leadership hid in the mountains of southern and western Jiangxi, hiding from the Kuomintang's attempts to eradicate them. In 1931, the Chinese Soviet Republic's government was established in Ruijin, which is sometimes called the "Former Red Capital" (红色故都, Gan: Fūng-set Kū-tu), or just the "Red Capital". In 1935, after complete encirclement by the Nationalist forces, the Communists broke through and began the Long March to Yan'an.

From 1930 to 1934, the National Government carried out five military campaigns against the Jiangxi Soviet area. Its brutal two-party battles and cleansing (including the internal cleansing of the Red Army and the cleaning of the post-war government) caused a large number of deaths or escapes, causing the population of Jiangxi to drop by 40%, until only 13.8 million people were left in 1936.

In 1936, after the opening of the Yuehan Railway in Hunan, Jiangxi lost its important position regarding north–south traffic. In 1937, the east-west Zhegan Railway was opened to traffic, which changed the original traffic patterns in Jiangxi to a large extent. The Jiujiang Port (九江港) began to decline in importance.

Following the Doolittle Raid during World War II, most of the B-25 American crews that came down in China eventually made it to safety with the help of Jiangxi locals. The Gan who helped them, however, paid dearly for sheltering the Americans. The Imperial Japanese Army began the Zhejiang-Jiangxi Campaign to intimidate the Chinese from helping downed American airmen. At least 10,000 civilians died in Jiangxi while searching for Doolittle's men.

Jiangxi came under the full control of the CCP upon the establishment of the People's Republic of China in 1949. The Republican provincial government was evacuated to Taichung in Taiwan Province before dissolving itself that same year.

== Geography ==
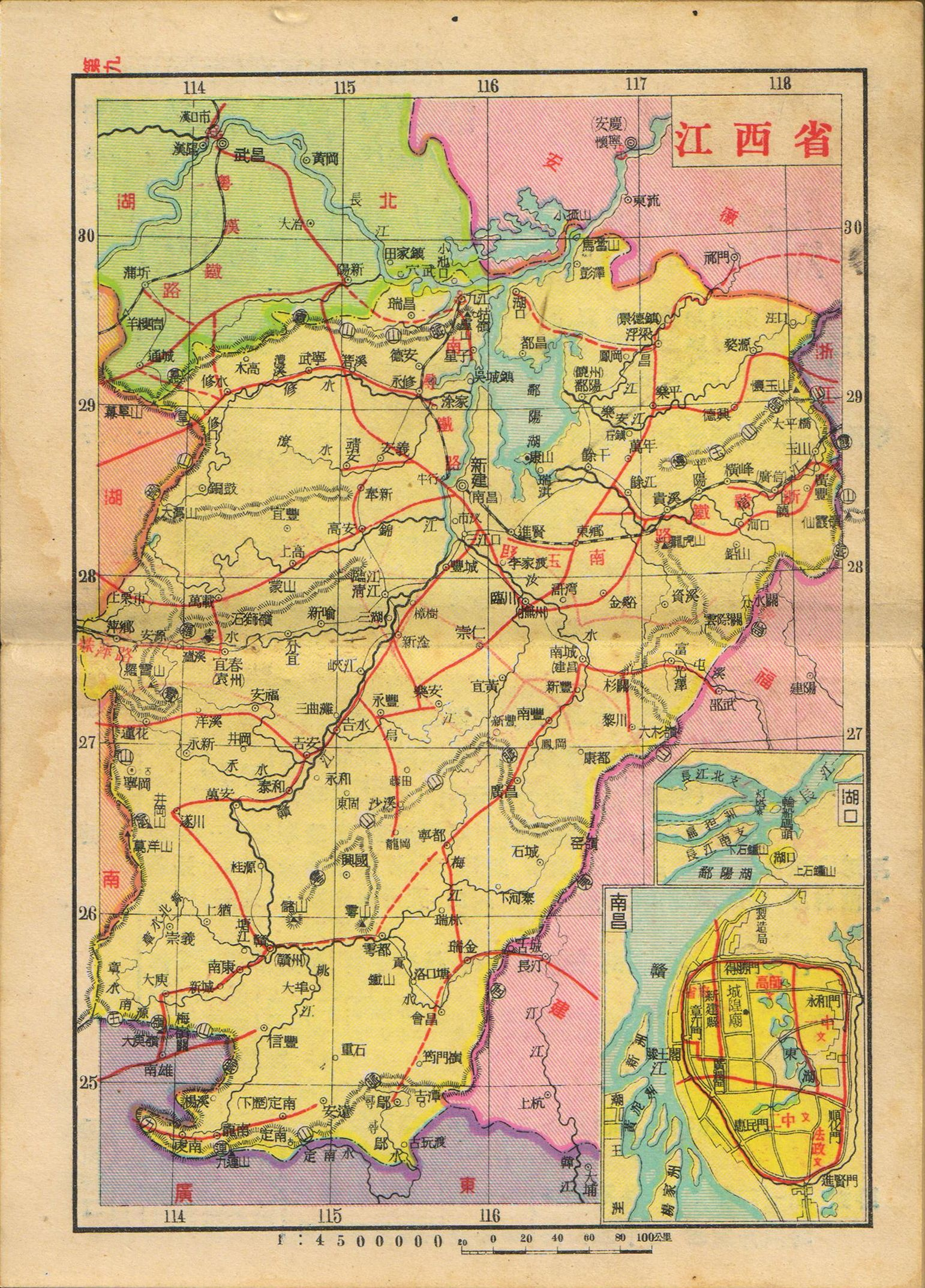
Jiangxi in 1936

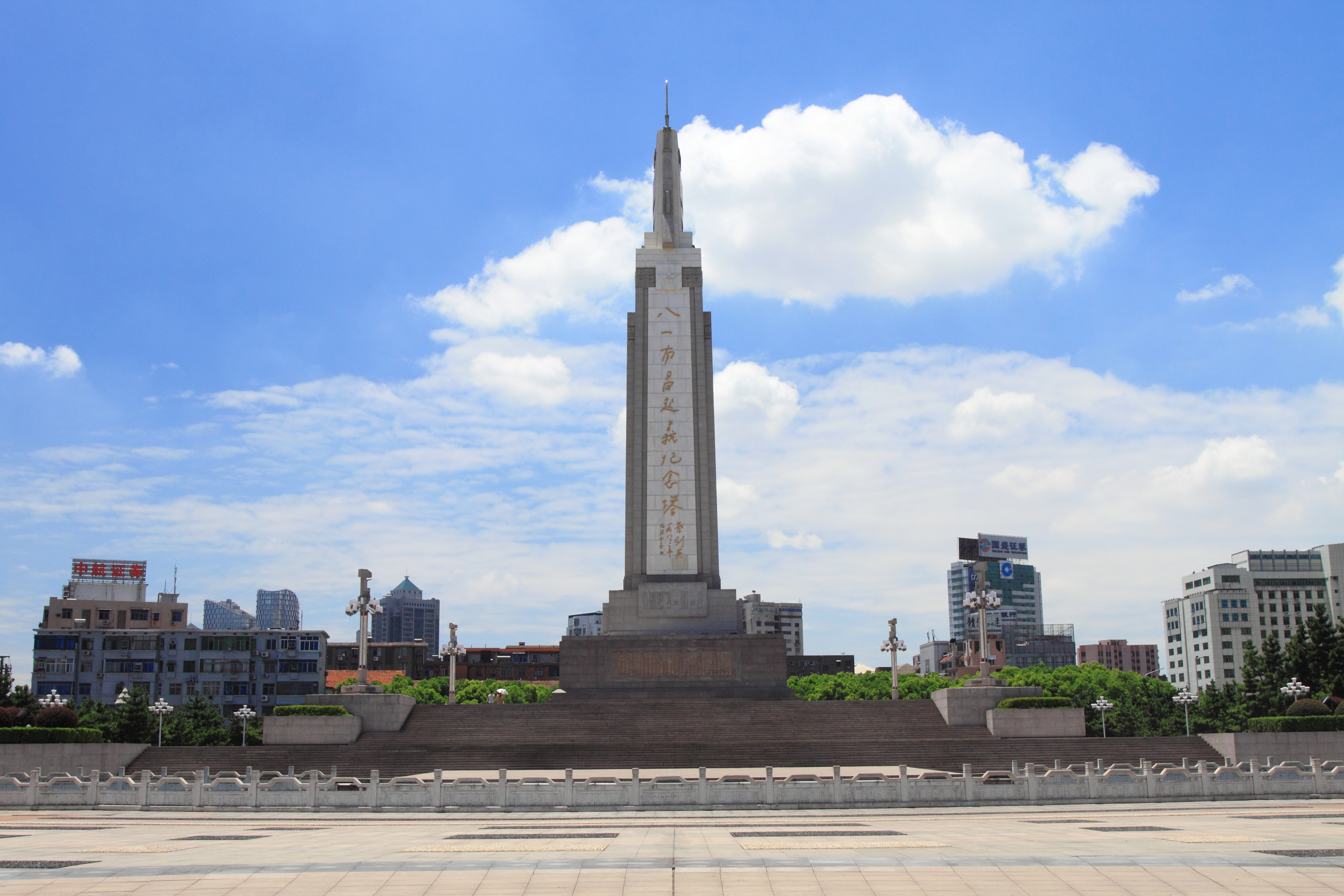
Nanchang City

Mountains surround Jiangxi on three sides, with the Mufu Mountains, Jiuling Mountains, and Luoxiao Mountains on the west; Huaiyu Mountains and Wuyi Mountains on the east; and the Jiulian Mountains (九连山) and Dayu Mountains in the south. The southern half of the province is hilly with ranges and valleys interspersed; while the northern half is flatter and lower in altitude. The highest point in Jiangxi is Mount Huanggang (黄岗山) in the Wuyi Mountains, on the border with Fujian. It has an altitude of 2,157 metres (7,077 ft).

The Gan River dominates the province, flowing through the entire length of the province from south to north. It enters Lake Poyang in the north, the largest freshwater lake of China; that lake in turn empties into the Yangtze River, which forms part of the northern border of Jiangxi. Important reservoirs include the Zhelin Reservoir in the northwest of the province on the Xiushui River, and the Wan'an Reservoir in the upper section of the Gan.

Jiangxi has a humid subtropical climate (Cfa under the Köppen climate classification), with short, cool, damp winters, and very hot, humid summers. Average temperatures are about 3 to 9 °C (37 to 48 °F) in January and 27 to 30 °C (81 to 86 °F) in July. Annual precipitation is 1,200 to 1,900 millimetres (47 to 75 in), much of it falling in the heavy rains occurring in late spring and summer.

Nanchang, the provincial capital and the most densely populated city, is one of the largest Chinese metropolises. Nanchang is the hub of Jiangxi civilization throughout its history, which plays a leading role in the commercial, intellectual and industrial and political fields. Ganzhou is the largest subdivision of Jiangxi.

== Administrative divisions ==
Jiangxi is divided into eleven prefecture-level divisions: all prefecture-level cities:

Administrative divisions of Jiangxi
Division code	Division	Area in km^{2}	Population 2020	Seat	Divisions		
Division code	Division	Area in km^{2}	Population 2020	Seat	Districts	Counties	CL cities
360000	Jiangxi Province	166,900.00	45,188,635	Nanchang city	27	61	12
360100	Nanchang city	7,432.18	6,255,007	Donghu District	6	3	
360200	Jingdezhen city	5,256.23	1,618,979	Changjiang District	2	1	1
360300	Pingxiang city	3,823.99	1,804,805	Anyuan District	2	3	
360400	Jiujiang city	18,796.79	4,600,276	Xunyang District	3	7	3
360500	Xinyu city	3,177.68	1,202,499	Yushui District	1	1	
360600	Yingtan city	3,556.74	1,154,223	Yuehu District	2		1
360700	Ganzhou city	39,317.14	8,970,014	Zhanggong District	3	13	2
360800	Ji'an city	25,283.80	4,469,176	Jizhou District	2	10	1
360900	Yichun city	18,637.67	5,007,702	Yuanzhou District	1	6	3
361000	Fuzhou city	18,811.12	3,614,866	Linchuan District	2	9	
361100	Shangrao city	22,826.04	6,491,088	Xinzhou District	3	8	1

Administrative divisions in Chinese and varieties of romanizations
English	Chinese	Pinyin	Gan Romanization
Jiangxi Province	江西省	Jiāngxī Shěng	kɔŋ11 śi11 sɛn2
Nanchang city	南昌市	Nánchāng Shì	lan31 chɔŋ11 si32
Jingdezhen city	景德镇市	Jǐngdézhèn Shì	ćin2 tɛt41 cǝn31 si32
Pingxiang city	萍乡市	Píngxiāng Shì	phin12 śiɔŋ11 si32
Jiujiang city	九江市	Jiǔjiāng Shì	ćiu2 kɔŋ11 si32
Xinyu city	新余市	Xīnyú Shì	śin11 y31 si32
Yingtan city	鹰潭市	Yīngtán Shì	in11? si32
Ganzhou city	赣州市	Gànzhōu Shì	? cǝu11 si32
Ji'an city	吉安市	Jí'ān Shì	ćit41 ŋɔn11 si32
Yichun city	宜春市	Yíchūn Shì	ńi31 chun11 si32
Fuzhou city	抚州市	Fǔzhōu Shì	? cǝu11 si32
Shangrao city	上饶市	Shàngráo Shì	sɔŋ32? si32

These prefecture-level cities are in turn subdivided into 100 county-level divisions (27 districts, 12 county-level cities, and 61 counties). Those in turn are divided into 1566 township-level divisions (830 towns, 560 townships, 8 ethnic townships, and 168 subdistricts).

Population by urban areas of prefecture and county cities
#	City	Urban area	District area	City proper	Census date
1	Nanchang (Note: New district established after census: Xinjian (Xinjian County). The new district not included in the urban area and district area count of the pre-expanded city.)	2,223,661	2,357,839	5,042,566	2010-11-01
(1)	Nanchang (new district)	390,719	795,412	see Nanchang	2010-11-01
2	Pingxiang	716,229	893,550	1,854,515	2010-11-01
3	Jiujiang (Note: New district established after census: Chaisang (Jiujiang County). The new district not included in the urban area and district area count of the pre-expanded city.)	611,321	704,986	4,728,778	2010-11-01
(3)	Jiujiang (new district)	93,035	159,909	see Jiujiang	2010-11-01
4	Ganzhou (Note: New districts established after census: Nankang (Nankang CLC), Ganxian (Ganxian County). These new districts not included in the urban area and district area count of the pre-expanded city.)	605,231	642,653	8,368,447	2010-11-01
(4)	Ganzhou (new districts)	430,680	1,334,600	see Ganzhou	2010-11-01
5	Xinyu	567,820	839,488	1,138,874	2010-11-01
6	Fuzhou (Note: New district established after census: Dongxiang (Dongxiang County). The new district not included in the urban area and district area count of the pre-expanded city.)	482,940	1,089,888	3,912,307	2010-11-01
(6)	Fuzhou (new district)	169,404	438,319	see Fuzhou	2010-11-01
7	Yichun	461,817	1,045,952	5,419,591	2010-11-01
8	Jingdezhen	430,084	473,561	1,587,477	2010-11-01
9	Fengcheng	379,914	1,336,392	see Yichun	2010-11-01
10	Ji'an	328,318	538,699	4,810,339	2010-11-01
11	Shangrao (Note: New district established after census: Guangfeng (Guangfeng County). The new district not included in the urban area and district area count of the pre-expanded city.)	298,975	416,219	6,579,747	2010-11-01
(11)	Shangrao (new district)	392,302	752,953	see Shangrao	2010-11-01
12	Gao'an	295,507	811,633	see Yichun	2010-11-01
13	Leping	286,351	810,353	see Jingdezhen	2010-11-01
14	Ruijin	216,229	618,885	see Ganzhou	2010-11-01
15	Guixi	210,319	558,451	see Yingtan	2010-11-01
16	Yingtan (Note: New district established after census: Yujiang (Yujiang County). The new district not included in the urban area and district area count of the pre-expanded city.)	191,893	214,229	1,125,156	2010-11-01
(16)	Yingtan (new district)	131,470	352,476	see Yingtan	2010-11-01
17	Zhangshu	188,586	555,120	see Yichun	2010-11-01
18	Ruichang	150,531	419,047	see Jiujiang	2010-11-01
19	Dexing	148,565	293,201	see Shangrao	2010-11-01
(20)	Gongqingcheng (Note: Gongqingcheng CLC was established by splitting from parts of De'an County after census.)	118,986	118,986	see Jiujiang	2010-11-01
(21)	Lushan (Note: Xingzi County is currently known as Lushan CLC after census.)	101,630	245,526	see Jiujiang	2010-11-01
22	Jinggangshan	86,673	152,310	see Ji'an	2010-11-01

== Politics ==
The politics of Jiangxi is structured in a dual party-government system like all other governing institutions in mainland China.

The Governor of Jiangxi is the highest-ranking official in the People's Government of Jiangxi. However, in the province's dual party-government governing system, the Governor has less power than the Jiangxi Chinese Communist Party Provincial Committee Secretary, colloquially termed the "Jiangxi CCP Party Chief".

== Economy ==
Jiangxi was a major recipient of China's investment in industrial capacity during the Third Front campaign.

Rice is the dominant crop in Jiangxi. Cash crops commonly grown include cotton and rapeseed. Jiangxi is the leading producer of kumquats in China, particularly in Suichuan County.

Mining-related industries are a major part of Jiangxi's economy.Jiangxi is rich in mineral resources, leading the provinces of China in deposits of copper, tungsten, gold, silver, uranium, thorium, tantalum, niobium, among others. Noted centers of mining include Dexing (copper) and Dayu County (tungsten).

It is located in extreme proximity to some of the richest provinces of China (Guangdong, Zhejiang, Fujian), which are sometimes blamed for taking away talent and capital from Jiangxi.

Jiangxi has the lowest wages and third lowest property prices in all of China. As of 2016 Jiangxi's nominal GDP was CNY 1.84 trillion or US$276.48 billion, and a per capita of CNY 40,400 or US$6,082.

Historical GDP of Jiangxi Province for 1978 –present (SNA2008; purchasing power parity of Chinese Yuan, as Int'l. dollar based on IMF WEO October 2017)
year	GDP				GDP per capita (GDPpc) based on mid-year population			Reference index	
year	GDP in millions			real growth (%)	GDPpc			exchange rate 1 foreign currency to CNY	
year	CNY	USD	PPP (Int'l$.)	real growth (%)	CNY	USD	PPP (Int'l$.)	USD 1	Int'l$. 1 (PPP)
2016	1,836,440	276,477	524,562	9.0	40,400	6082	11,540	6.6423	3.5009
2015	1,672,378	268,508	471,159	9.1	36,968	5935	10,415	6.2284	3.5495
2014	1,571,463	255,822	442,616	9.7	34,890	5680	9,827	6.1428	3.5504
2013	1,441,019	232,678	402,868	10.1	32,122	5187	8,980	6.1932	3.5769
2012	1,294,888	205,131	364,675	11.0	28,967	4589	8,158	6.3125	3.5508
2011	1,170,282	181,192	333,842	12.4	26,292	4071	7,500	6.4588	3.5055
2010	945,126	139,615	285,485	14.0	21,368	3156	6,454	6.7695	3.3106
2009	765,518	112,065	242,444	13.2	17,437	2553	5,522	6.8310	3.1575
2008	697,105	100,374	219,436	13.3	15,986	2302	5,032	6.9451	3.1768
2007	580,025	76,279	192,386	13.2	13,389	1761	4,441	7.6040	3.0149
2006	482,053	60,470	167,513	12.3	11,197	1405	3,891	7.9718	2.8777
2005	405,676	49,523	141,894	12.9	9,478	1157	3,315	8.1917	2.8590
2000	200,307	24,196	73,661	8.0	4851	586	1,784	8.2784	2.7193
1995	116,973	14,007	42,857	6.8	2896	347	1,061	8.3510	2.7294
1990	42,862	8,961	25,174	4.5	1134	237	666	4.7832	1.7026
1985	20,789	7,079	14,831	14.8	597	203	426	2.9366	1.4017
1980	11,115	7,418	7,432	4.2	342	228	229	1.4984	1.4955
1978	8,700	5,595		13.3	276	177		1.5550	

=== Economic and technological development zones ===
- Nanchang Export Processing Zone

Nanchang National Export Expressing Zone is located in Nanchang Hi-Tech Industrial Development Zone, it was approved by the State Council on 8 May 2006, and passed the national acceptance inspection on 7 September 2007. It has a planning area of 1 km^{2} (0.39 sq mi) and now has built 0.31 km^{2} (0.12 sq mi). It enjoys simple and convenient customs clearances, and special preferential policies both for Nanchang National Export Expressing Zone and NCHDZ.

- Nanchang National High-tech Industrial Development Zone

Nanchang National High-tech Industrial Development Zone (NCHDZ for short hereafter) is the only national grade high-tech zoned in Jiangxi, it was established in Mar. 1991. The zone covers an area of 231 km^{2} (89 sq mi), in which 32 km^{2} (12 sq mi) have been completed. NCHDZ possesses unique nature condition and sound industry foundation of accepting electronics industry. NCHDZ has brought 25% industrial added value and 50% industrial benefit and tax to Nanchang city by using only 0.4% land area.

- Nanchang Economic and Technological Development Zone
- Jiujiang Free Trade (Tariff-free) Zone
- Jiujiang National Economical and Technological Development Zone
- Jiujiang Gongqingcheng National High-tech Industrial Development Zone

== Demographics ==
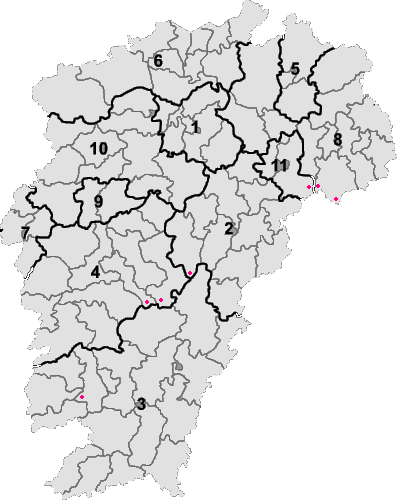
She ethnic townships in Jiangxi

The population of Jiangxi according 2020 Chinese census is 45.18 million. 99.73% of that is Han Chinese, predominantly Gan and Hakka. Ganzhou, Jiangxi's largest city, has an especially large number of Hakka. Ethnic minorities include the She people.

Jiangxi and Henan both have the most unbalanced gender ratios of all Chinese provinces. Based on a 2009 British Medical Journal study, the ratio is over 140 boys for every 100 girls in the 1–4 age group.

Historical population

Year	Pop.	±%
1912	23,988,000	—
1928	20,323,000	−15.3%
1936–37	15,805,000	−22.2%
1947	12,507,000	−20.9%
1954	16,772,865	+34.1%

Year	Pop.	±%
1964	21,068,019	+25.6%
1982	33,184,827	+57.5%
1990	37,710,281	+13.6%
2000	40,397,598	+7.1%
2010	44,567,475	+10.3%

In 2019 the most-common surname in Jiangxi was Liú (刘), the only province where this was the case. Overall Liu is the fourth-most common surname in the country.

=== Religion ===
Religion in Jiangxi (Note: The data was collected by the Chinese General Social Survey (CGSS) of 2009 and by the Chinese Spiritual Life Survey (CSLS) of 2007, reported and assembled by Xiuhua Wang (2015) in order to confront the proportion of people identifying with two similar social structures: ① Christian churches, and ② the traditional Chinese religion of the lineage (i.e. people believing and worshipping ancestral deities often organised into lineage "churches" and ancestral shrines). Data for other religions with a significant presence in China (deity cults, Buddhism, Taoism, folk religious sects, Islam, et al.) was not reported by Wang.)
1. Chinese folk religion (24.1%)
2. Christianity (2.31%)
3. Other religions or not religious people (Note: This may include: Buddhists; Confucians; Deity worshippers; Taoists; Members of folk religious sects; Small minorities of Muslims; And people not bounded to, nor practicing any, institutional or diffuse religion.) (73.6%)

The predominant religions in Jiangxi are Chinese folk religions, Taoist traditions and Chinese Buddhism. According to surveys conducted in 2007 and 2009, 24.05% of the population believes and is involved in ancestor veneration, while 2.31% of the population identifies as Christian.

The reports did not give figures for other types of religion; 73.64% of the population may be either irreligious or involved in worship of nature deities, Buddhism, Confucianism, Taoism, folk religious sects.

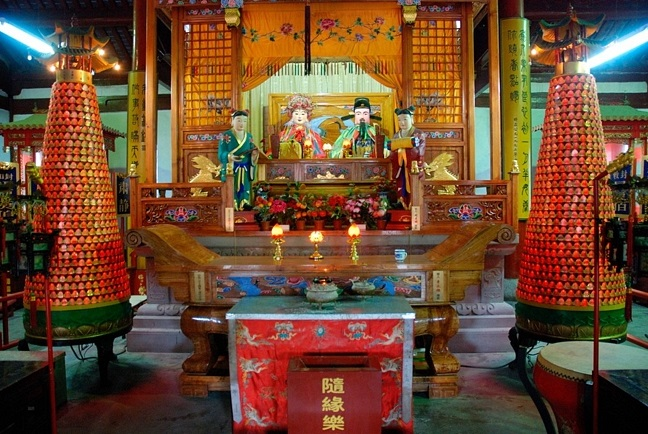
Altar of Shangdi and Doumu at the Chengxu Temple (Taoist) in Zhouzhuang

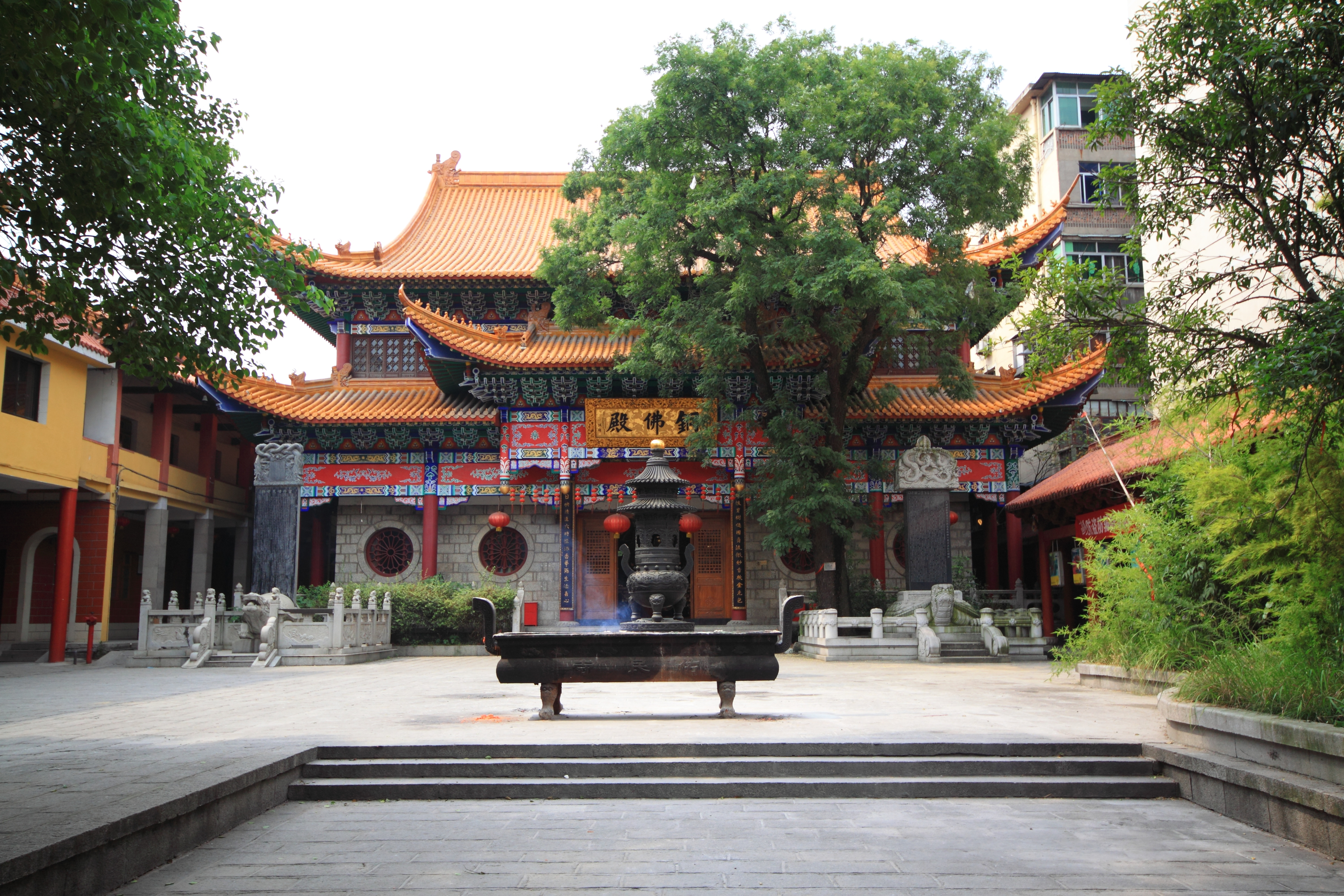
Youmin Buddhist Temple in Nanchang

== Culture ==
Jiangxi is the main area of concentration of the Gan varieties of Chinese, spoken over most of the northern two-thirds of the province. Examples include the Nanchang dialect, Yichun dialect and Ji'an dialect. The southern one-third of the province speaks Hakka. There are also Mandarin, Huizhou, and Wu dialects spoken along the northern border.

Ganju (赣剧, Gan Opera) is the type of Chinese opera performed in Jiangxi.

Although little known outside of the province, Jiangxi cuisine is rich and distinctive. Flavors are some of the strongest in China, with heavy use of chili peppers and especially pickled and fermented products.

Jingdezhen is widely regarded as the producer of the best porcelain in China, it is known as the "porcelain capital" of China.

Jiangxi also was a historical center of Chan Buddhism.

Prominent examples of Hakka architecture can be found in Jiangxi.

== Transportation ==
As of January 2015, Jiangxi had two Yangtze River crossings, both in Jiujiang.

=== Rail ===
The Beijing–Kowloon Railway and Shanghai–Kunming Railway crisscross the province and intersect at Nanchang, which also has a high-speed rail link to Jiujiang. In addition, Jiangxi is connected by rail to Anhui Province via the Anhui–Jiangxi and Tongling–Jiujiang Railways; to Hubei via the Wuhan–Jiujiang Railway; and to Fujian via the Yingtan–Xiamen, Hengfeng–Nanping, Ganzhou–Longyan and Xiangtang–Putian Railways.

== Tourism ==
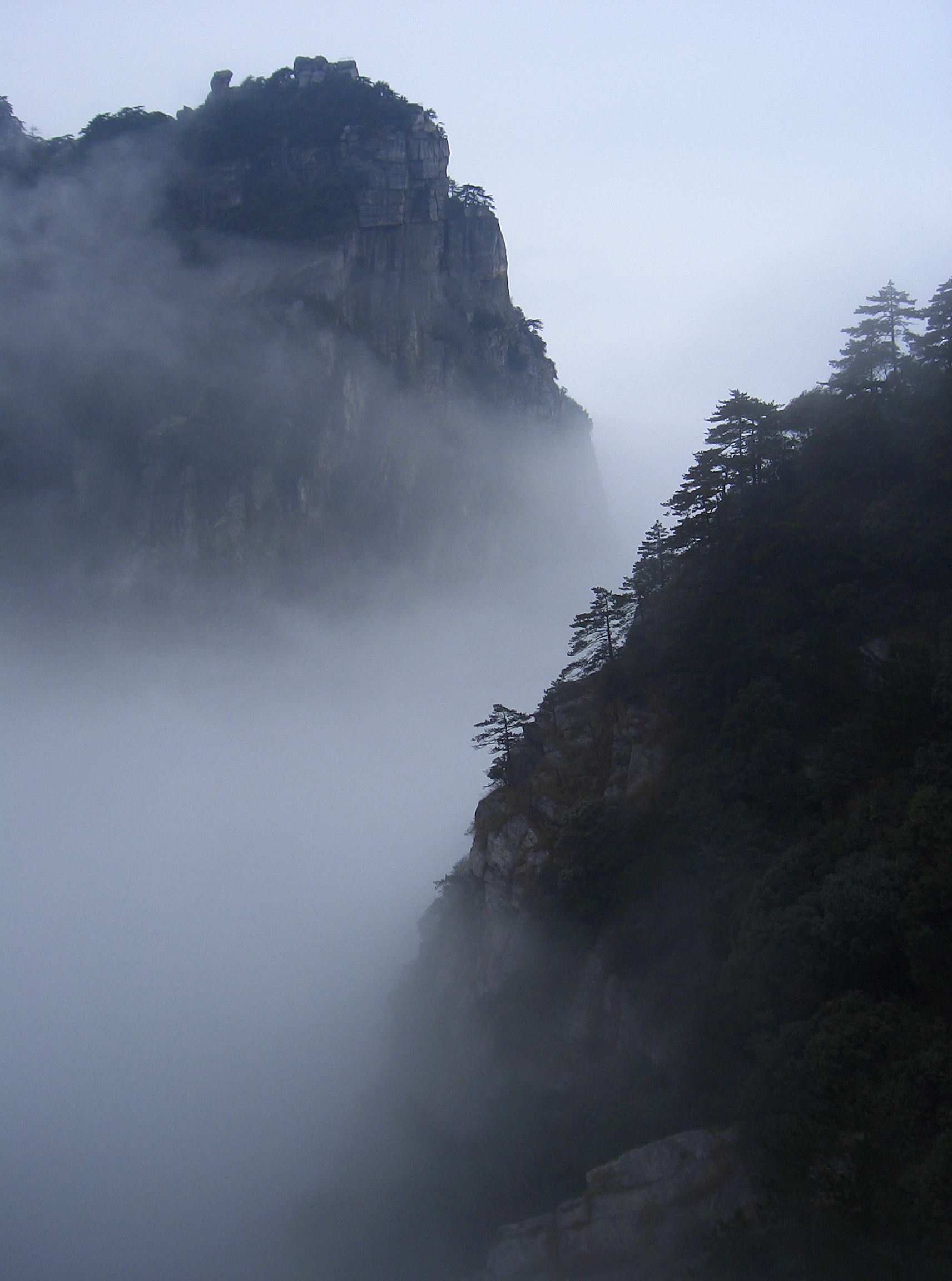
The mountain peaks of Mount Lu National Park

There are several famous mountains in Jiangxi Province, including Mount Lu in Jiujiang, Jinggang Mountains at the border of Jiangxi and Hunan, and Mount Sanqing in Yushan county.

Near the northern port city of Jiujiang lies the well-known resort area of Mount Lu. Also near the city is the Donglin Temple, an important Buddhist temple in china.

Near the small city of Yingtan is the resort area of Longhushan, which purports to be the birthplace of Taoism and hence has great symbolic value to Taoists. The region has many temples, cave complexes, mountains and villages.

The Mount Lu National Park has been a UNESCO World Heritage Site since 1996.

Kuling located on the top of Mount Lu is a summer resort developed by European in the 19th century. There were 3000 European living in Kuling, Lushan and Jiujiang in summer time in 1920s.

In 2007, Jiangxi (specifically the Zhelin Reservoir, located in Jiujiang) was the filming location for the fifteenth series of the American TV show Survivor.

== Flora and fauna ==
The mountainous terrain and large forest coverage of Jiangxi has made it historically one of the more wild places of central China. Several mountain areas along the northern border with Hunan and Hubei are potential sites for "wilderness" preserves specifically for protecting or even reintroducing tigers.

Other wildlife, though not plentiful, are more numerous in Jiangxi than in many other developed areas of China. Numerous species of birds are common, especially around the marshes of Lake Poyang in the north. Though protected, mammals such are still common enough that they will even occasionally be seen in markets for sale as game meat, or possibly even in a forest.

The late Paleocene mesonychid, Jiangxia chaotoensis was found in the province, and named after it.

== Education ==
=== Colleges and universities ===
List of colleges and universities in Jiangxi:

- University of Jiujiang
- Jiangxi College of Foreign Studies
- East China University of Technology
- East China Jiaotong University
- Jiangxi Agricultural University
- Jiangxi Institute of Education
- Jiangxi Normal University
- Jiangxi Science and Technology Normal University
- Jiangxi University of Finance and Economics
- Jingdezhen Ceramic Institute
- Jinggangshan University
- Nanchang Institute of Technology
- Nanchang Hangkong University
- Nanchang University
- Xinyu University
- Yichun University

== Sister provinces ==
- Lapland, Finland
- Bay of Plenty Region, New Zealand
- Okayama Prefecture, Japan
- Bohol, Philippines
- Hesse, Germany
- Kentucky, United States
- Mato Grosso do Sul, Brazil
- Sabah, Malaysia
- Siem Reap, Cambodia

== See also ==
- Major national historical and cultural sites in Jiangxi
