= Roman Square =

Roman Square may refer to:

- Roman Square (Podgorica), a square in Podgorica, Montenegro
- Piața Romană or Roman Square, a square in Bucharest, Romania
