= List of city squares =

This article lists the city squares in the world larger than 15,000 square metres (160,000 sq ft). The areas given are as noted in the articles and references provided, but may not be directly comparable.

== List ==
City square	City	Country	Area		Dimensions, notes	Year	Photo	Ref
City square	City	Country	(m^{2}) (Note: May not be directly comparable)	(ft^{2})	Dimensions, notes	Year	Photo	Ref
Xinghai Square	Dalian	China	1,760,000	18,900,000	Commemorates the centenary of the founding of the city	1997		
Times Square	Daqing	China	1,440,000	15,500,000		2000		
Merdeka Square	Jakarta	Indonesia	1,000,000	11,000,000	Approx. 1 by 1 km (0.62 by 0.62 mi)	1976		
Yenikapı Square	Istanbul	Turkey	715,000	7,700,000	Created mostly through land reclamation	2014		
Sunflower Square	Palmas	Brazil	570,000	6,100,000	Approx. 802–833 by 643–718 m (2,631–2,733 by 2,110–2,356 ft)	1991		
Rizal Park	Manila	Philippines	566,560	6,098,400	On the new central line	1820		
Huacheng Square	Guangzhou	China	560,000	6,000,000		2010		
Tiananmen Square	Beijing	China	440,000	4,700,000	880 by 500 m (2,890 by 1,640 ft)	1651		
Macroplaza	Monterrey	Mexico	400,000	4,300,000		1980s		
India Gate Complex	New Delhi	India	306,600	3,300,000	Approx. 625 m (2,051 ft) diameter	1926		
Quezon Memorial Circle	Manila	Philippines	271,139	2,918,520	Approx. 625 m (2,051 ft) diameter	1978		
Liberty Square	Taipei	Taiwan	240,000	2,600,000		1970s		
Parade Square	Warsaw	Poland	240,000	2,600,000	Approx. 600 by 400 m (2,000 by 1,300 ft)	1950s		
Quancheng Square	Jinan	China	220,000	2,400,000	Approx. 790 by 280 m (2,590 by 920 ft)	1999		
People's Square	Linyi	China	216,000	2,330,000	670 by 320 m (2,200 by 1,050 ft)	2001		
Cultural Square	Changchun	China	205,000	2,210,000	Was part of the Imperial Palace of the Japanese puppet state Manchukuo	1953		
Praça do Relógio	São Paulo	Brazil	176,000	1,890,000	Contains all six ecosystems found in the state of São Paulo	1971		
Kuybyshev Square	Samara	Russia	174,000	1,870,000	Approx. 500–530 by 300–330 m (1,640–1,740 by 980–1,080 ft)	1894		
Perm Esplanade	Perm	Russia	152,000	1,640,000	Approx. 950 by 160 m (3,120 by 520 ft)	1970		
Niti Mandala Square	Denpasar	Indonesia	151,800	1,634,000	410 by 370 m (1,350 by 1,210 ft)			
People's Square	Shanghai	China	140,000	1,500,000		1994		
Bulgaria Square	Sofia	Bulgaria	140,000	1,500,000		1981		
Piazza Carlo di Borbone	Caserta	Italy	130,000	1,400,000	More the esplanade of the Royal Palace of Caserta than a city square	1750		
Universitetskaya Square	Moscow	Russia	130,000	1,400,000				
Moskovskaya Square	Saint Petersburg	Russia	130,000	1,400,000				
Place des Quinconces	Bordeaux	France	126,000	1,360,000		1820		
People's Square	Dalian	China	125,000	1,350,000		1914		
Bayi Square	Nanchang	China	122,588	1,319,530	Commemorates the Nanchang Uprising	1956		
Republic Square	Almaty	Kazakhstan	121,800	1,311,000	580 by 210 m (1,900 by 690 ft)	1980		
Sanam Luang	Bangkok	Thailand	119,200	1,283,000	Part of the Thailand Grand Palace	1855		
Freedom Square	Kharkiv	Ukraine	119,000	1,280,000	690–750 by 96–125 m (2,264–2,461 by 315–410 ft)	1926		
Karebosi Square	Makassar	Indonesia	110,350	1,187,800	330 by 310 m (1,080 by 1,020 ft)			
Millennium Park	Chicago	United States	99,000	1,070,000		2004		
Pha That Luang Square	Vientiane	Laos	99,000	1,070,000				
Black Star Square	Accra	Ghana	98,220	1,057,200	Commissioned to honour the visit of Queen Elizabeth II to Ghana	1961		
Unirii Square	Bucharest	Romania	97,000	1,040,000		1900s		
Kruhla Square	Poltava	Ukraine	93,500	1,006,000	Diameter 345 m (1,132 ft)			
Tysyacheletiya Square	Kazan	Russia	90,000	970,000	510 by 130–250 m (1,670 by 430–820 ft)			
Plaza de Balcarce	Balcarce	Argentina	90,000	970,000	300 by 300 m (980 by 980 ft)			
Naqsh-e Jahan Square	Isfahan	Iran	89,600	964,000	560 by 160 m (1,840 by 520 ft)	1598		
St Stephen's Green	Dublin	Ireland	89,000	960,000	350 by 255 m (1,148 by 837 ft)	1663		
Prato della Valle	Padua	Italy	88,620	953,900		1874		
Mangshi Square	Mangshi	China	86,800	934,000	306.37 by 314 m (1,005.2 by 1,030.2 ft)			
Jemaa el-Fnaa	Marrakesh	Morocco	86,000	930,000	240 by 363 m (787 by 1,191 ft)			
Spianada Square	Corfu	Greece	84,000	900,000	412 by 204 m (1,352 by 669 ft)	1576		
Charles Square	Prague	Czech Republic	80,552	867,050	550 by 152 metres (1,804 by 499 ft)	1348		
Republic Square	Kayseri	Turkey	80,000	860,000		1906		
Museumplein	Amsterdam	Netherlands	79,000	850,000				
Odori Park	Sapporo	Japan	78,900	849,000	Approx. 1,430 by 55 m (4,692 by 180 ft)	1869		
Praça do Império	Lisbon	Portugal	78,400	844,000	280 by 280 m (920 by 920 ft)			
Gelebe Square	Baku	Azerbaijan	78,300	843,000	290 by 270 m (950 by 890 ft)			
Plaine de Plainpalais	Geneva	Switzerland	78,135	841,040	Rhombus of 640 by 200 m (2,100 by 660 ft)			
Place de la Concorde	Paris	France	76,900	828,000	240 by 360 m (790 by 1,180 ft)	1772		
Sükhbaatar Square	Ulaanbaatar	Mongolia	76,000	820,000				
Kim Il Sung Square	Pyongyang	North Korea	75,000	810,000		1954		
Gasibu Square	Bandung	Indonesia	74,900	806,000	940 by 120 m (3,080 by 390 ft)			
Cours Léopold & Place Carnot	Nancy	France	74,400	801,000	620 by 120 m (2,030 by 390 ft)			
Tahrir Square	Cairo	Egypt	74,000	800,000				
Piazza della Repubblica	Milan	Italy	73,500	791,000		1865		
Victory Square	Vitebsk	Belarus	72,200	777,000				
Plaza de la Revolución	Havana	Cuba	72,000	780,000				
Batam Centre Park	Batam	Indonesia	70,000	750,000				
Place de l'Hôtel-de-Ville	Le Havre	France	70,000	750,000	280 by 250 metres (920 by 820 ft)			
Independence Square	Minsk	Belarus	70,000	750,000		1964		
The Square	Palmerston North	New Zealand	70,000	750,000				
Alun-Alun Merdeka Ngawi	Ngawi	Indonesia	70,000	750,000	270 by 260 m (890 by 850 ft)			
Piazza Garibaldi	Naples	Italy	70,000	750,000		1870		
Plaza Moreno	La Plata	Argentina	66,700	718,000	230 by 290 m (750 by 950 ft)			
Kontraktova Square	Kyiv	Ukraine	65,000	700,000				
New Haven Green	New Haven	United States	65,000	700,000				
Alun-Alun Purworejo	Purworejo	Indonesia	64,800	698,000	270 by 250 m (890 by 820 ft)			
Freedom Square	Olecko	Poland	64,288	691,990	225 by 232 by 340 by 254 m (738 by 761 by 1,115 by 833 ft)			
Azadliq Square	Baku	Azerbaijan	62,700	675,000	570 by 110 m (1,870 by 360 ft)			
Esplanade of the Foro Italico	Palermo	Italy	62,500	673,000		1846		
Place Bellecour	Lyon	France	62,000	670,000	300 by 220 by 300 by 190 m (980 by 720 by 980 by 620 ft)			
Ba Đình Square	Hanoi	Vietnam	60,000	650,000	400 by 150 m (1,310 by 490 ft)			
Naval Square	Dalian	China	59,000	640,000		2000		
Victoria Square	Adelaide	Australia	58,000	620,000	161 by 322 m (528 by 1,056 ft)			
John Paul II Square	Budapest	Hungary	57,600	620,000	240 by 240 m (790 by 790 ft)			
Zócalo	Mexico City	Mexico	57,600	620,000	240 by 240 m (790 by 790 ft)			
Kızılay Square	Ankara	Turkey	55,000	590,000	265 by 132.5 m (869 by 435 ft)			
Kikar Hamedina	Tel Aviv	Israel	55,000	590,000	132.5 by 265 m (435 by 869 ft)			
Piazza Vittorio Emanuele II	Rome	Italy	54,954	591,520	316 by 174 m (1,037 by 571 ft)	1880s		
Tangshan Earthquake Monument Square	Tangshan	China	54,400	586,000	320 by 170 m (1,050 by 560 ft)	1986		
Shouyi Square	Wuhan	China	54,200	583,000	Commemorates the Wuchang Uprising	2005		
Yakub Kolas Square	Minsk	Belarus	52,000	560,000				
Radničné Square	Spišská Nová Ves	Slovakia	51,100	550,000	Lens shape			
Széchenyi Square	Szeged	Hungary	50,087	539,130				
Palace Square	Saint Petersburg	Russia	50,000	540,000				
Theberge Square	Icó	Brazil	50,000	540,000				
Azadi Square	Tehran	Iran	50,000	540,000				
Alun-Alun Utara	Yogyakarta	Indonesia	50,000	540,000	220 by 210 m (720 by 690 ft)			
Grand Park	Los Angeles	United States	48,562	522,720		2012		
Liberation Square	Baghdad	Iraq	48,520	522,300				
Nathan Phillips Square	Toronto	Canada	48,500	522,000		1965		
Heydar Aliyev Square	Ganja	Azerbaijan	48,300	520,000	420 by 115 m (1,378 by 377 ft)			
SNP Square	Zvolen	Slovakia	48,000	520,000	425 by 113 m (1,394 by 371 ft)			
Railway Terminal Square	Minsk	Belarus	48,000	520,000				
Marktplatz	Freudenstadt	Germany	47,300	509,000	219 by 216 m (719 by 709 ft)	1599		
Marktplatz	Heide	Germany	47,000	510,000		1434		
Merdeka Square	Medan	Indonesia	45,500	490,000	260 by 170 m (850 by 560 ft)			
Wenceslas Square	Prague	Czech Republic	45,000	480,000	750 by 60 m (2,460 by 200 ft)	1348		
Place du Pâtis	Montargis	France	45,000	480,000				
Place Charles de Gaulle	Paris	France	45,000	480,000	Diameter 240.86 m (790.2 ft)			
Konstitutzii Square	Saint Petersburg	Russia	44,100	475,000	Approx. 210 by 210 m (690 by 690 ft)			
Erzsébet tér	Budapest	Hungary	43,200	465,000	Approx 240 by 180 m (790 by 590 ft)			
Deák tér	Sopron	Hungary	40,000	430,000	870 by 46 m (2,854 by 151 ft); Longest in Central Europe			
Plaza 25 de Mayo	Resistencia	Argentina	40,000	430,000	200 by 200 m (660 by 660 ft)			
Rabin Square	Tel Aviv	Israel	40,000	430,000	160 by 250 m (520 by 820 ft)			
Augustusplatz	Leipzig	Germany	40,000	430,000		1785		
Piazza Vittorio Veneto	Turin	Italy	40,000	430,000	360 by 111 m (1,181 by 364 ft)			
Place Viger	Montreal	Canada	40,000	430,000	400 by 100 m (1,310 by 330 ft)			
Old Port	Marseille	France	40,000	430,000				
Sofiyskaya Square	Pushkin	Russia	40,000	430,000	200 by 200 m (660 by 660 ft)			
Main Square	Kraków	Poland	40,000	430,000	200 by 200 m (660 by 660 ft)	1257		
Skanderbeg Square	Tirana	Albania	40,000	430,000		1939		
Victory Square	Minsk	Belarus	39,375	423,830				
Schloßplatz	Berlin	Germany	39,375	423,830				
Washington Square Park	New York City	United States	39,000	420,000		1871		
Piazza Duca d'Aosta	Milan	Italy	38,000	410,000				
Market Square	Wrocław	Poland	37,920	408,200	213 by 178 m (699 by 584 ft)			
Central Square	Chennai	India	37,800	407,000		2021		
Plaza de Colón	Madrid	Spain	37,000	400,000				
Plaza de España	Madrid	Spain	36,900	397,000				
Lange Voorhout	The Hague	Netherlands	36,850	396,700	Approx. 470 m long	1536		
Empire State Plaza	Albany	United States	36,820	396,300	Approx. 415 by 89 m (1,362 by 292 ft)	1976		
Masarykovo náměstí	Jihlava	Czech Republic	36,653	394,530		1270		
Square of the 56-ers	Budapest	Hungary	36,500	393,000	Approx. 730 by 50 m (2,400 by 160 ft) (excluding Heroes' Square)			
Avenida da Liberdade	Braga	Portugal	36,000	390,000	Approx. 400 by 80 m (1,310 by 260 ft)			
Taksim Square	Istanbul	Turkey	35,949	386,950				
Unirii Square	Cluj-Napoca	Romania	35,200	379,000	220 by 162 m (722 by 531 ft)			
Kungsträdgården	Stockholm	Sweden	35,000	380,000	350 by 100 m (1,150 by 330 ft)			
Place de Jaude	Clermont-Ferrand	France	35,000	380,000				
Jiřího z Poděbrad Square	Prague	Czech Republic	35,000	380,000	240 by 150 m (790 by 490 ft)	1896		
Domplatz	Erfurt	Germany	34,500	371,000				
Plaça d'Espanya	Barcelona	Spain	34,000	370,000		1929		
Sobornaya Square	Pushkin	Russia	34,000	370,000				
Plaza Bolívar	Maracay	Venezuela	33,920	365,100	320 by 106 metres (1,050 by 348 ft)			
Place de la République	Paris	France	33,677	362,500	283 by 119 m (928 by 390 ft)			
Simpang Lima Square	Semarang	Indonesia	33,000	360,000	230 by 150 m (750 by 490 ft)			
Muhammad V Square	Casablanca	Morocco	32,900	354,000		1916		
Piazza Mercatale	Prato	Italy	32,294	347,610				
Konak Square	İzmir	Turkey	32,000	340,000				
Giv'on Square	Tel Aviv	Israel	32,000	340,000	Approx. 300 m by 105 m			
Place Denfert-Rochereau	Paris	France	32,000	340,000	220 by 145 m (722 by 476 ft)	1863		
Sonoma Plaza	Sonoma	United States	32,000	340,000		1846		
Grote Markt	Sint-Niklaas	Belgium	31,900	343,000		1248		
Praça Mouzinho de Albuquerque	Porto	Portugal	31,416	338,160				
Place Championnet	Valence	France	31,404	338,030				
Franklin Square	Philadelphia	United States	31,700	341,000		1683		
Logan Square	Philadelphia	United States	31,700	341,000		1684		
Rittenhouse Square	Philadelphia	United States	31,700	341,000		1683		
Washington Square	Philadelphia	United States	31,700	341,000		1683		
Plaza de España	Seville	Spain	31,000	330,000	Approx. 270 by 150 m (890 by 490 ft) (half-circle)			
Praça do Comércio	Lisbon	Portugal	30,600	329,000	175 by 175 m (574 by 574 ft)			
Náměstí Míru	Prague	Czech Republic	30,400	327,000	190 by 160 m (620 by 520 ft)	1884		
Plaça de Catalunya	Barcelona	Spain	30,000	320,000		1902		
Republic Square	Yerevan	Armenia	30,000	320,000		1926		
City Hall Square	Copenhagen	Denmark	29,300	315,000				
Katedros aikštė	Vilnius	Lithuania	28,600	308,000	Approx. 300 by 90 m (980 by 300 ft)			
Plaza de la Encarnación	Seville	Spain	28,160	303,100		1948		
Lincoln's Inn Fields	London	United Kingdom	28,000	300,000	Approx. 200 by 140 m (660 by 460 ft)	1630s		
Russell Square	Perth	Australia	27,360	294,500	Approx. 228 by 120 m (748 by 394 ft)			
Neumarkt	Cologne	Germany	27,300	294,000	Approx. 250 by 110 m (820 by 360 ft)			
Plaza de la Fé Juan Pablo II	Managua	Nicaragua	27,214	292,930				
Náměstí Republiky	Plzeň	Czech Republic	26,827	288,760	193 by 139 m (633 by 456 ft)			
Praça dos Três Poderes	Brasília	Brazil	26,400	284,000	120 by 220 m (390 by 720 ft)	1960		
Heroes' Square	Budapest	Hungary	25,600	276,000	Approx. 160 by 160 m (520 by 520 ft)			
Masarykovo náměstí	Bělá pod Bezdězem	Czech Republic	25,350	272,900	195 by 130 m (640 by 427 ft)			
The Hashemite Plaza	Amman	Jordan	25,200	271,000				
Tyršovo náměstí	Hostomice	Czech Republic	25,200	271,000	Approx. 400 by 63 m (1,312 by 207 ft)			
Piazza del Plebiscito	Naples	Italy	25,000	270,000				
Sennaya Square	Saint Petersburg	Russia	25,000	270,000	Approx. 250 by 100 m (820 by 330 ft)			
Red Square	Moscow	Russia	24,750	266,400	Approx. 300 by 70 m (980 by 230 ft)			
Place Jean-Jaurès	Marseille	France	24,670	265,500	Approx. 225 by 106 m (738 by 348 ft)	1890s		
Market Square	Pułtusk	Poland	24,636	265,180	377 by 68 m (1,237 by 223 ft)			
Plaza del Pilar	Zaragoza	Spain	24,100	259,000				
Piazza Duccio Galimberti	Cuneo	Italy	24,000	260,000		1800		
Queen Square	Bristol	United Kingdom	24,000	260,000		1727		
Piazza della Libertà	Florence	Italy	23,940	257,700	190 by 126 m (623 by 413 ft)	1875		
Schlossplatz	Stuttgart	Germany	23,800	256,000	170 by 140 m (560 by 460 ft)	1860s		
Market Square	Kuopio	Finland	23,400	252,000	180 by 130 m (590 by 430 ft)	1775		
Syntagma Square	Athens	Greece	23,336	251,190	156 by 156 m (512 by 512 ft)	1834		
St. Peter's Square	Vatican City	Vatican City	22,783	245,230	Ellipse, axes 196 by 148 m (643 by 486 ft)	1667		
Souq Waqif Square	Doha	Qatar	22,600	243,000				
Piazza della Magione	Palermo	Italy	22,200	239,000				
Zhongshan Square	Dalian	China	22,000	240,000				
Old Market Square	Nottingham	United Kingdom	22,000	240,000				
Karlovo náměstí	Třebíč	Czech Republic	22,000	240,000	Approx. 360 by 60 m (1,180 by 200 ft)			
Dam Square	Amsterdam	Netherlands	20,000	220,000	200 by 100 m (660 by 330 ft)			
Roman Square	Podgorica	Montenegro	20,000	220,000				
Sava Square	Belgrade	Serbia	20,000	220,000	200 by 100 m (660 by 330 ft)	2021		
Grand'Place	Arras	France	20,000	220,000	200 by 100 m (660 by 330 ft)			
Anna Square	Chennai	India	20,000	220,000	Built in memory of former Chief Minister of Tamil Nadu, C. N. Annadurai (1967–69)	1996		
Pershing Square	Los Angeles	United States	20,000	220,000				
Stortorget	Karlskrona	Sweden	20,000	220,000	200 by 100 m (660 by 330 ft)			
Náměstí Přemysla Otakara II.	Vysoké Mýto	Czech Republic	19,929	214,510	145 by 135 by 155 by 129 m (476 by 443 by 509 by 423 ft)			
Old Market Square	Poznań	Poland	19,881	214,000	141 by 141 m (463 by 463 ft)	1253		
Plaza de Mayo	Buenos Aires	Argentina	19,713	212,190				
Place des Vosges	Paris	France	19,600	211,000	140 by 140 m (460 by 460 ft)			
Husovo náměstí	Rakovník	Czech Republic	19,500	210,000	390 by 50 m (1,280 by 160 ft)			
Plaza de Armas	Cusco	Peru	19,376	208,560	173 by 112 m (568 by 367 ft)			
Vrijthof	Maastricht	Netherlands	19,300	208,000		1226		
Gwanghwamun Plaza	Seoul	South Korea	19,024	204,770				
Place Vendôme	Paris	France	18,570	199,900	213 by 124 m (699 by 407 ft)	1699		
Macedonia Square	Skopje	North Macedonia	18,500	199,000				
Market Square	Lviv	Ukraine	18,300	197,000	142 by 129 m (466 by 423 ft)			
Vagzal Squares	Baku	Azerbaijan	18,150	195,400	330 by 55 m (1,083 by 180 ft)			
Place de la Riponne	Lausanne	Switzerland	18,000	190,000	200 by 90 m (660 by 300 ft)	1838		
Přemysl Otakar II. Square	České Budějovice	Czech Republic	17,968	193,410	134 by 134 m (440 by 440 ft)	1265		
Place Saint-Lambert	Liège	Belgium	17,900	193,000			Liège JPG01	
Place du Canada	Montreal	Canada	17,800	192,000	200 by 89 m (656 by 292 ft)			
Market Square	Zakliczyn	Poland	17,544	188,840	172 by 102 m (564 by 335 ft)			
Freedom Square	Poznań	Poland	17,425	187,560	205 by 85 m (673 by 279 ft)			
Vratislavovo náměstí	Nové Město na Moravě	Czech Republic	17,300	186,000	230 by 75 m (755 by 246 ft)			
Mevlana Square	Konya	Turkey	17,000	180,000				
Piazza del Duomo	Milan	Italy	17,000	180,000		1330s		
Market Square	Nowy Sącz	Poland	16,610	178,800	151 by 110 m (495 by 361 ft)			
Piazza dei Martiri	Carpi	Italy	16,560	178,300	276 by 60 m (906 by 197 ft)			
Mírové náměstí	Kouřim	Czech Republic	16,250	174,900	210 by 78 m (689 by 256 ft)			
Martyrs' Square	Beirut	Lebanon	16,200	174,000	270 by 60 m (890 by 200 ft)	1860		
Plaza Mayor de la Constitución	Guatemala City	Guatemala	16,000	170,000				
Terreiro do Paço	Vila Viçosa	Portugal	16,000	170,000				
Piazza Castello	Milan	Italy	15,800	170,000				
Horní náměstí	Olomouc	Czech Republic	15,800	170,000	Approx. 160 by 100 m (520 by 330 ft)			
Smetanovo náměstí	Litomyšl	Czech Republic	15,776	169,810	493 by 32 m (1,617 by 105 ft)			
Market Square	Turku	Finland	15,625	168,190	125 by 125 m (410 by 410 ft)	1828		
Senatskaya Square	Saint Petersburg	Russia	15,625	168,190	Approx. 125 by 125 m (410 by 410 ft)			
Náměstí Tomáše Bati	Sezimovo Ústí	Czech Republic	15,600	168,000	205 by 77 m (673 by 253 ft)			
Mírové náměstí	Litoměřice	Czech Republic	15,500	167,000	195 by 90 by 180 by 75 m (640 by 295 by 591 by 246 ft)	1220s		
Velké náměstí	Hradec Králové	Czech Republic	15,500	167,000	340 by 90 by 320 by 10 m (1,115 by 295 by 1,050 by 33 ft)			
Kongens Nytorv	Copenhagen	Denmark	15,500	167,000				
Market Square	Nowy Targ	Poland	15,180	163,400	138 by 110 m (453 by 361 ft)			
Alexanderplatz	Berlin	Germany	15,000	160,000				
Republic Square	Antalya	Turkey	15,000	160,000				
Pariser Platz	Berlin	Germany	15,000	160,000				
City Hall Park	Surabaya	Indonesia	15,000	160,000				
Trg Republike	Podgorica	Montenegro	15,000	160,000				
Sechseläutenplatz	Zurich	Switzerland	15,000	160,000	150 by 100 metres (490 by 330 ft)	2014		
Privokzalnaya Square	Pushkin	Russia	15,000	160,000	Circle, diameter 200-metre (660 ft)			

== See also ==
- Plaza de Armas (disambiguation)
