= Araguaia =

Araguaia may refer to:

- Araguaia River, the main tributary of the Tocantins River
- Araguaia National Park, a protected area in Brazilian state of Tocantins
- Araguaia Atlético Clube, Brazilian football team from Alto Araguaia, Mato Grosso
- Araguaia Palace, seat of Tocantins government
- Araguaia (TV series), 2010 Rede Globo television series
- The Araguaia Guerrilla War
