= Saint-Louis-des-Chartrons =

Church building in Bordeaux, France

Coordinates: 44.8516°N 0.5721°W

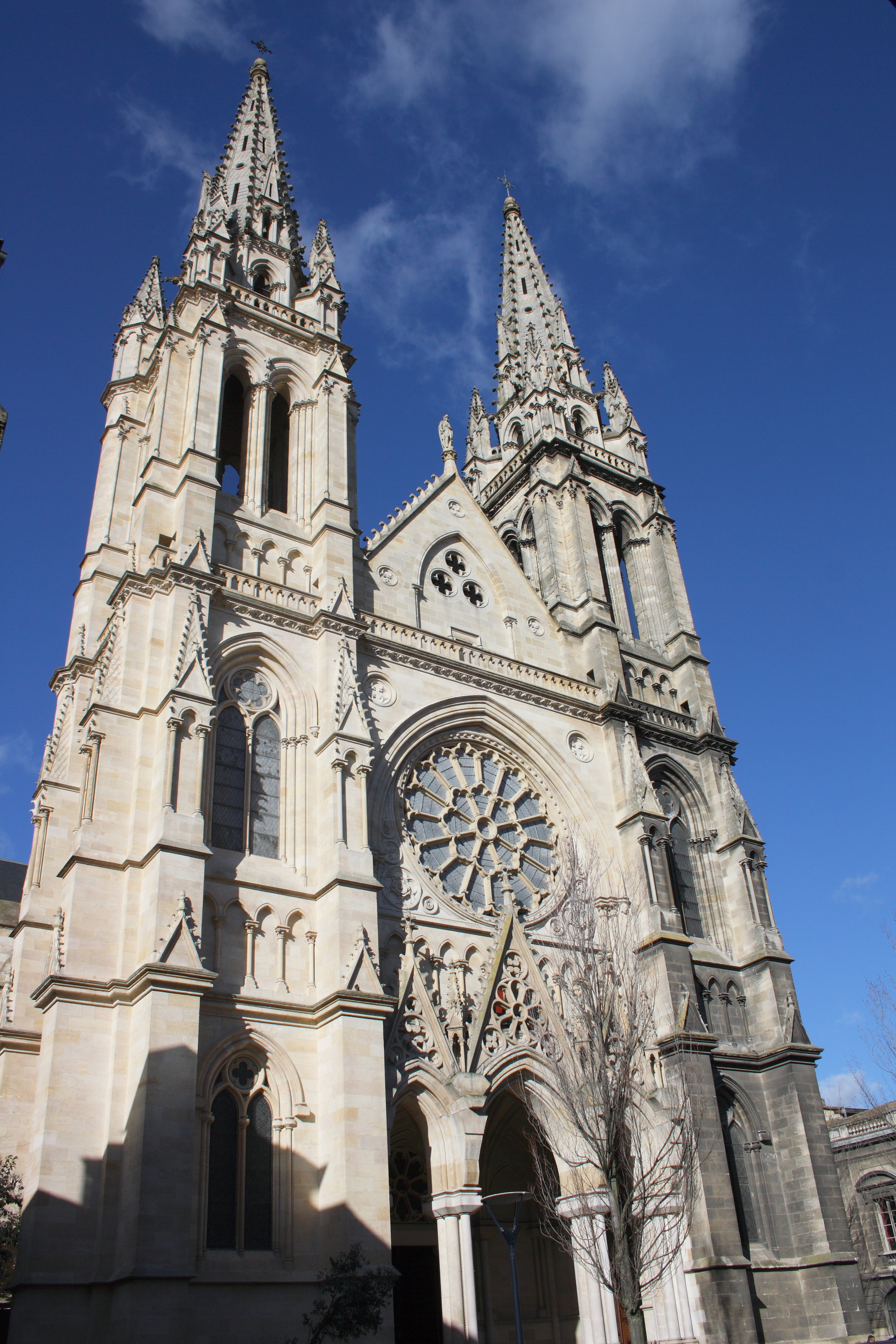
Facade of the church on rue Notre-Dame.

The Church of Saint-Louis-des-Chartrons is a Roman Catholic church located in Bordeaux, France. It is a gothic revival church dedicated to Saint Louis, king of France (1214–1270).

== History and description ==
Saint-Louis Church was built between 1875 and 1879 following the plans of Charles-Louis Brun, a Bordelais architect. Consecration occurred in 1895 by Mgr Lecot. It is 60.35 meters long by 23 meters wide and 22.26 meters high under vaults. The high towers measure 58 meters and are visible from all over the city above the elegant quartier des Chartrons (Chartrons district), on the north of Place des Quinconces.

The stained-glass windows are particularly remarkable; they come from the workshops of Henri Feur (1899) and Nicolas Lorin (1879, in the choir).

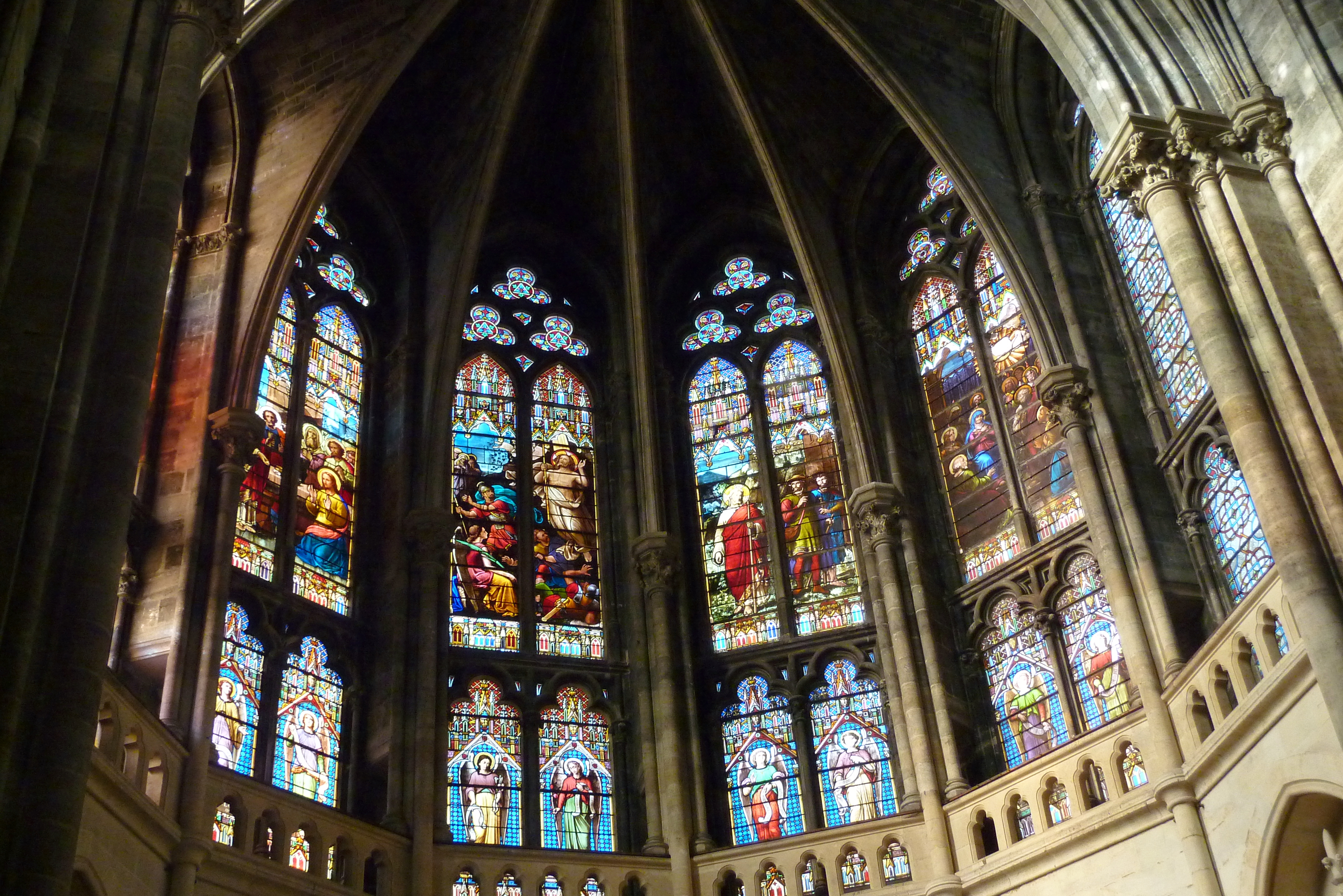
Stained-glass windows in the choir by Nicolas Lorin (1879)

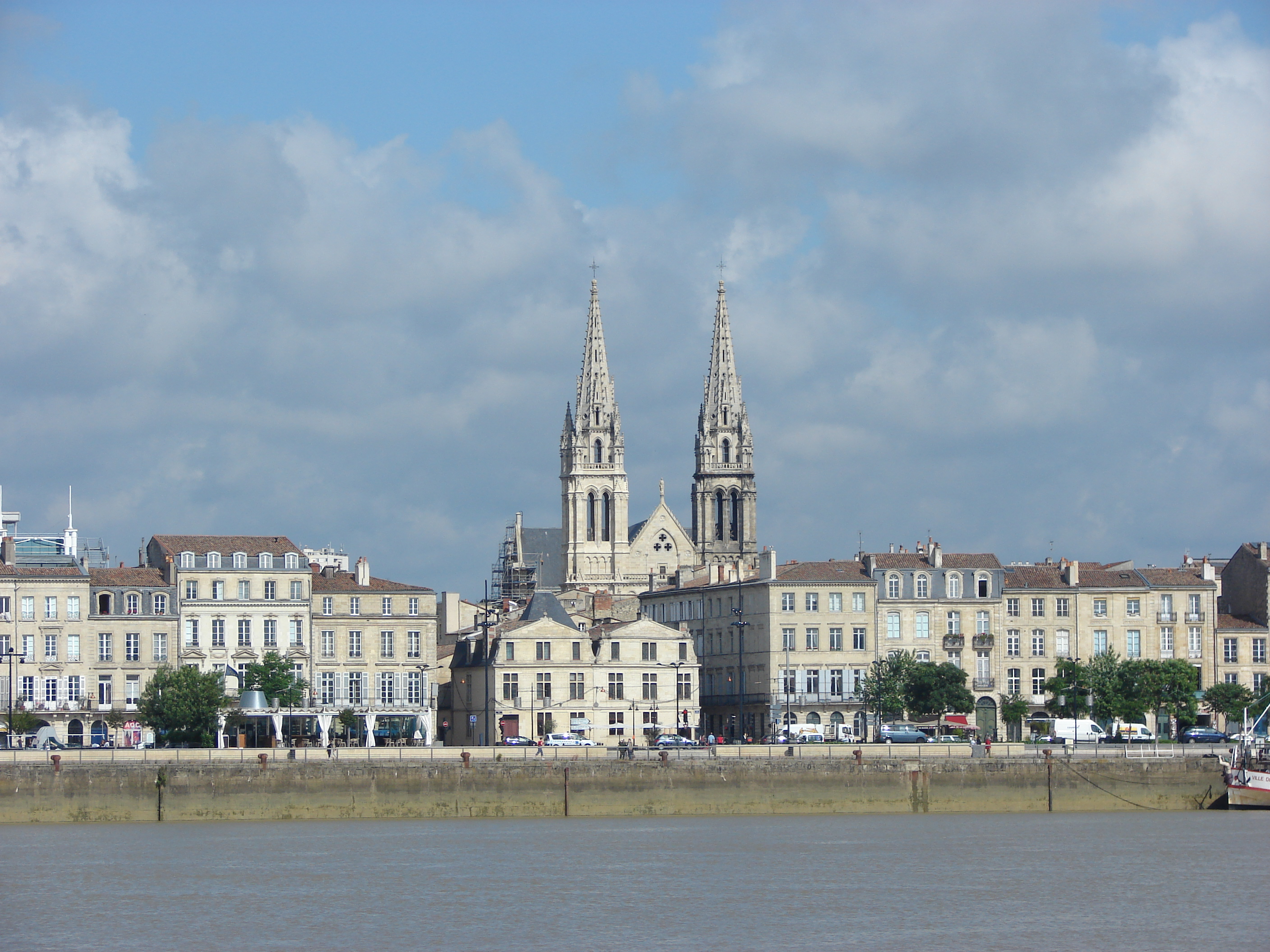
View from the Garonne River

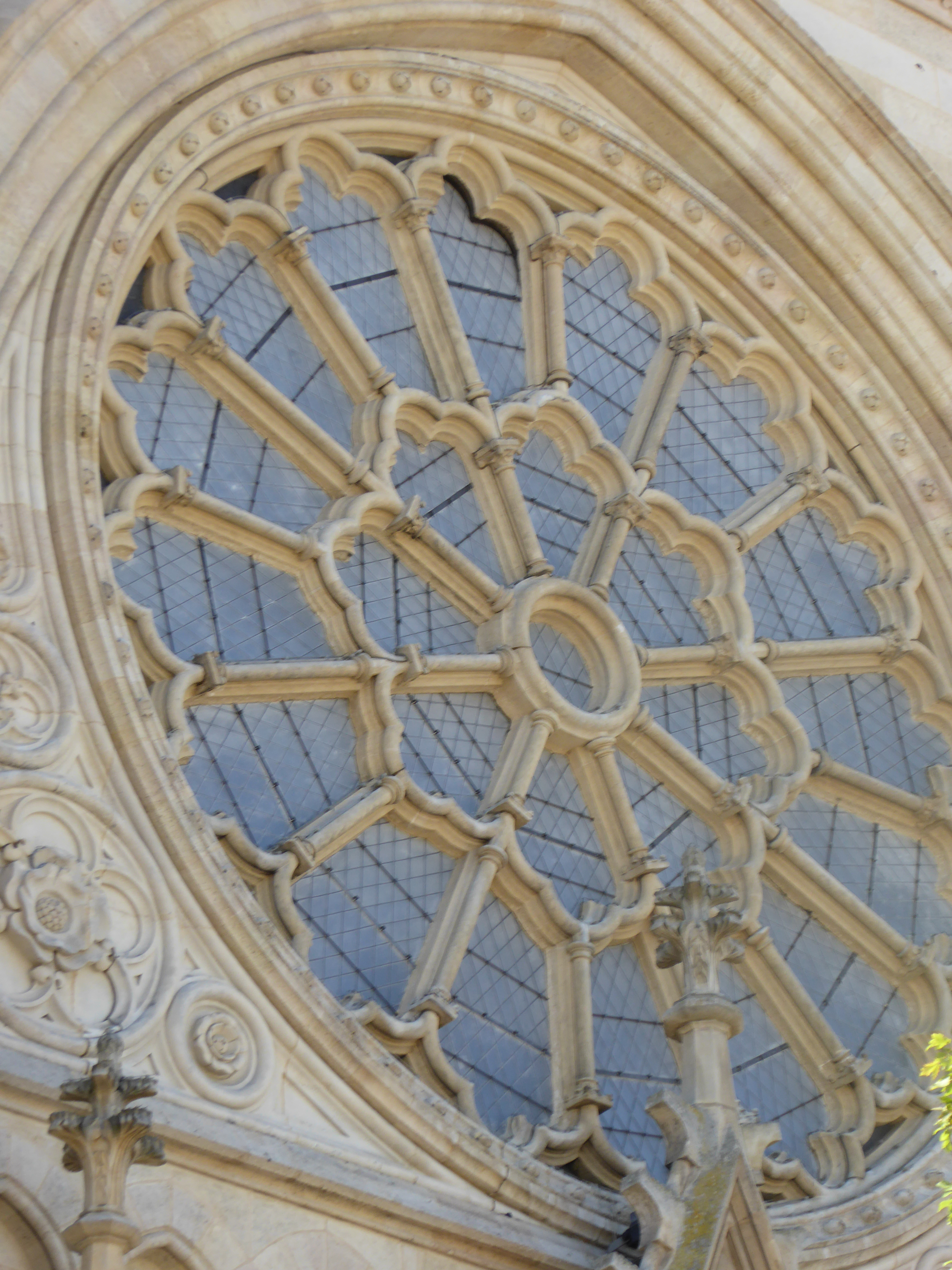
Detail of the rose window on the facade

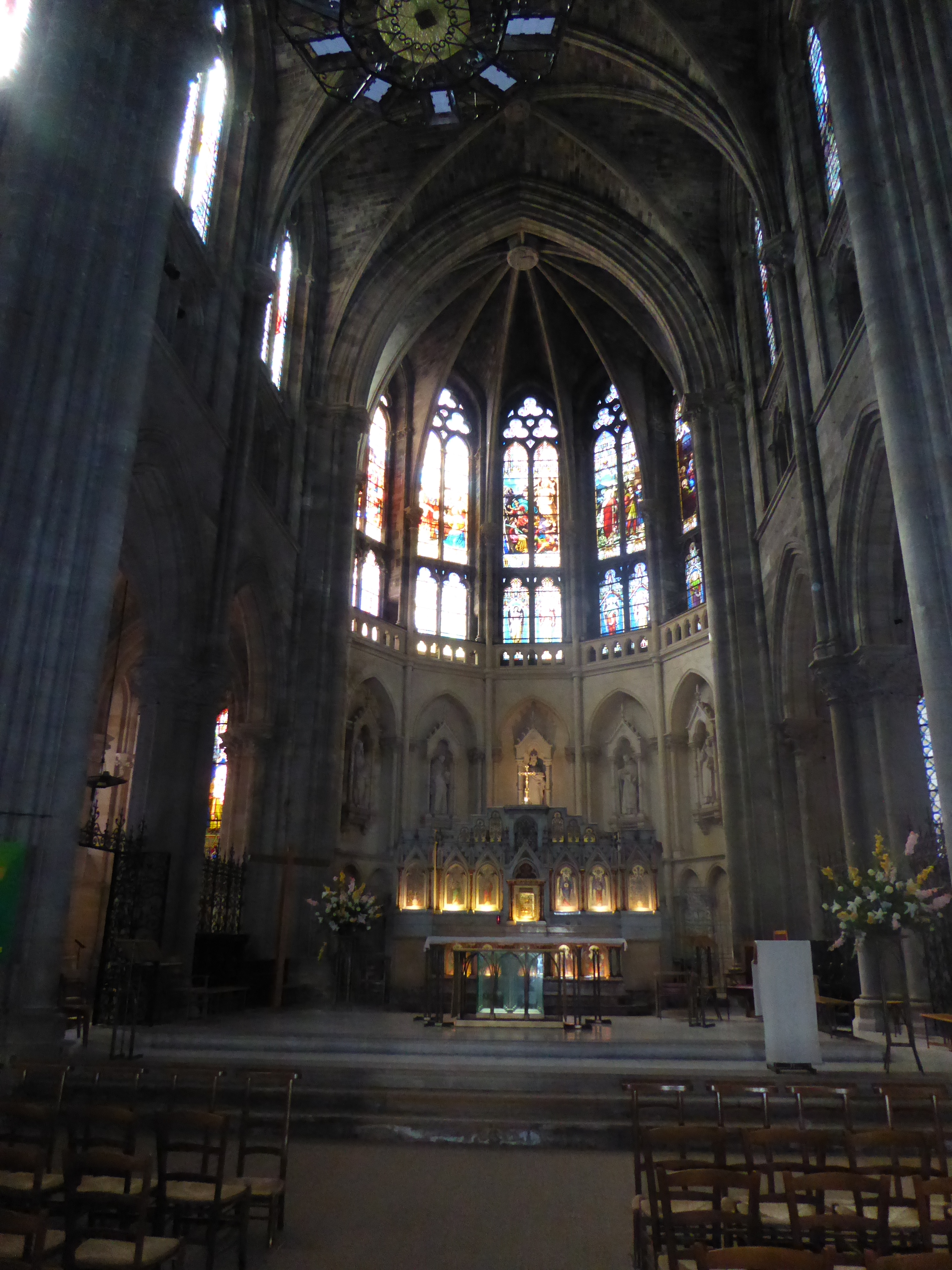
Interior

== Organ ==
The organ was listed on the French register of Monuments historiques in 1992. It was built by Georges Wenner in 1881, remade by Gaston Maille in 1901 and repaired by Pascal Quoirin in 2005.

I Grand-Orgue C–g^{3}
Montre	16′
Bourdon	16′
Montre harmonique	8′
Principal	8′
Bourdon	8′
Flûte harmonique	8′
Gambe	8′
Prestant	4′
Flûte harmonique	4′
Nazard	2 deux tiers′
Octavin	2′
Plein Jeu VI
Cornet V
Bombarde	16′
Trompette	8′
Clairon	4′

II Positif intérieur C–g^{3}
Flûte douce	8′
Flûte harmonique	8′
Salicional	8′
Unda Maris	8′
Flûte	4′
Doublette	2′
Plein Jeu VI
Cornet III
Trompette	8′
Basson harmonique	8′
Clarinet	8′
Clairon	4′

III Récit C–g^{3}
Kérolophone	8′
Cor de nuit	8′
Flûte harmonique	8′
Violoncelle	8′
Voix céleste	8′
Flûte harmonique	4′
Cymbale III
Basson	16′
Trompette harmonique	8′
Basson Hautbois	8′
Voix humaine	8′
Clairon	4′

Pédale C–f^{1}
Soubasse	16′
Flûte	16′
Bourdon	16′
Flûte	8′
Bourdon	8′
Flûte	4′
Bombarde	16′
Trompette	8′
Basson	8′
Clairon	4′
