= Sunflower Square =

Square in Palmas, Brazil

- Public square
- {{{other_names}}}
- Praça dos Girassóis (Portuguese)
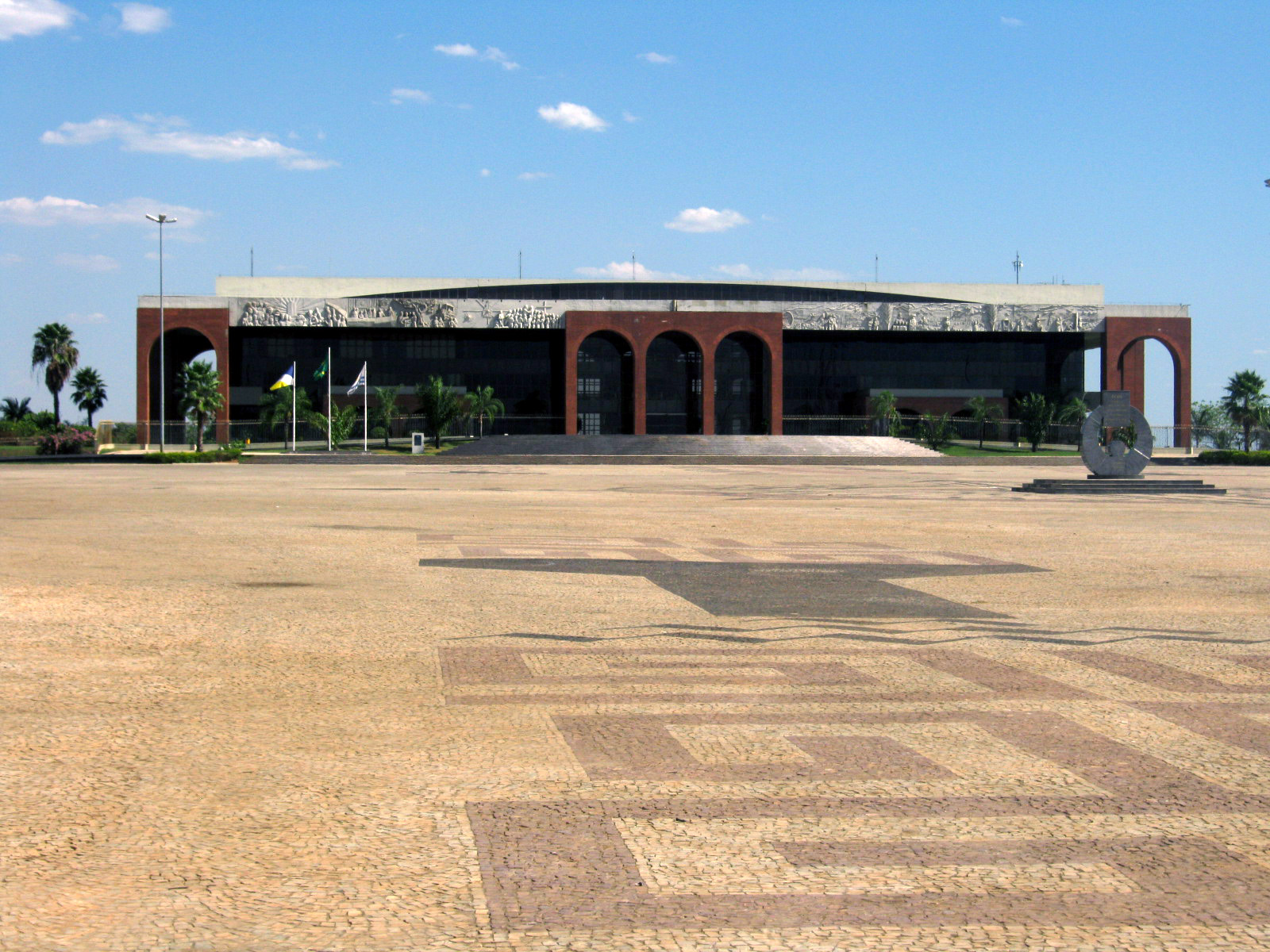
- View of the Araguaia Palace at the square
- Constructed: 1989–1991
- Opened: March 9, 1991
- Area: 571,000 m^{2} (6,150,000 sq ft)
- Location: Palmas, Tocantins, Brazil
- Interactive map of Sunflower Square
- Coordinates: 10°11′04.5″S 48°20′01.3″W

The Sunflower Square (Portuguese: Praça dos Girassóis) is the main public square in the Brazilian city of Palmas, the capital of the state of Tocantins. It was inaugurated in 1991 and holds the Araguaia Palace, the seat of the Tocantins government. It is also one of the largest squares in the world.

== History ==
It was designed to house the decision-making center of the government of the state of Tocantins. For Palmenses, the importance of Sunflower Square goes further; after all, it was in this large space that the history of construction of the youngest capital in the country began. Strolling through the Square is to learn a little more about the history and culture of the city and Tocantins.

On May 20, 1989, Governor Siqueira Campos laid the foundation stone of Palmas, initiating the construction of the definitive capital of Tocantins. The stone was laid on the north side of the square by the Cruzeiro, a cross of brazilwood, carved by artisan Arnildo Antunes. The Cruzeiro was the first historical monument erected in Palmas, having been listed in 2000 as Cultural Heritage of the city.

Located in front of the Cruzeiro, the Súplica dos Pioneiros monument is another attraction that reflects the history of Palmas very well. The set of bronze sculptures forms a family and honors the first residents who arrived in the capital and helped build the city. An interesting detail of these statues is that they face east, where the sun rises, in a position of gratitude for a new life in a new place.

=== Culture ===
In the square there are a dozen attractions that tell the story of the people of Tocantins. In the north end is the Monument to the Bible, which is right in the center of a compass rose, drawn on the floor in Portuguese stones. The sculpture is in the form of a man with his arms extended towards the sky, holding the Holy Bible in his hands.

Still on this side of the square, the Fonte Luminosa features jets of water that reach 15 meters in height. In this same place, visitors gather at the kiosks and playground for a family program.

In the north end, it is possible to visit the Sundial, stroll through Krahô Square, a tribute to indigenous peoples, check out the location of the Metropolitan Cathedral of Palmas and take pictures at the Cascata, which represents the rivers and waterfalls of Tocantins.

Still in the Square, it is impossible not to notice the monument to the Eighteen of the Copacabana Fort, which recalls the revolt of 1922 against the First Brazilian Republic in Rio de Janeiro, which was led by Lieutenant Siqueira Campos. Next to these bronze sculptures, there is the Prestes Column memorial, the work of architect Oscar Niemeyer and which recalls the passage of the Prestes Column through Tocantins between 1920 and 1930.

== Araguaia Palace ==
The seat of the executive power is one of the most visited spots in the square. Inaugurated in 1991, the Araguaia Palace has the history of the State imprinted in every architectural detail. Outside, the friezes that frame the building add up to 144 plaques two meters long and report each step of the creation of Tocantins, until the implementation of Palmas. At the top of the building, golden sculptures reproduce the state's coat of arms.

Inside the Araguaia Palace, historic panels installed in the hall show the struggles and achievements of Tocantins in a work of art with traits ranging from expressionism to cubism. Still in the hall, visitors can position themselves for photos at the exact point of the geodesic center of Brazil.
