= Bayi Square =

Square in Nanchang, China

Coordinates: 28°40′38″N 115°53′59″E

Bayi Square (Chinese: 八一广场; pinyin: Bāyī Guǎngchǎng; lit. 'Aug. 1st Square') in Nanchang, Jiangxi, China was built from August 1, 1977, to January 8, 1979, in memory of Nanchang Uprising (a.k.a. August 1, 1927 Uprising).

The size of this square is 78,000 m^{2} now after a reconstruction taking place beginning in 2002. Since the day it was finished, it has always been the second largest square in China, after Tiananmen Square in Beijing. Ever since it was constructed, this square became a main site for most big-scale ceremonies and marches. To ordinary residents, due to the extremely hot and humid climate in Nanchang, the square was a popular place for outdoor lounging during summer nights until recent years when more and more families are able to afford air conditioning. A music fountain, which was built in the south of the square has become a favourite destination for people, especially in summer nights.

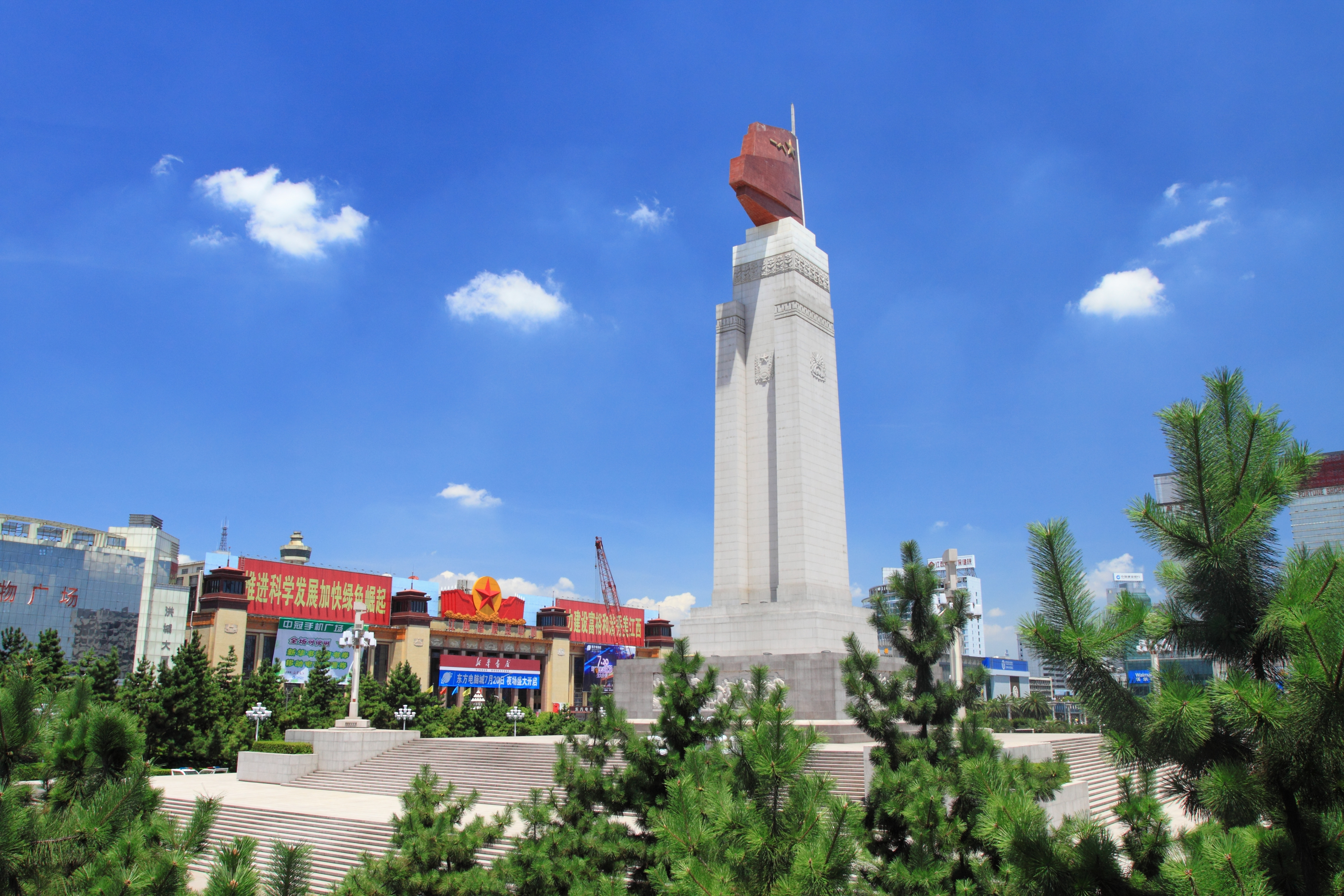
southern part

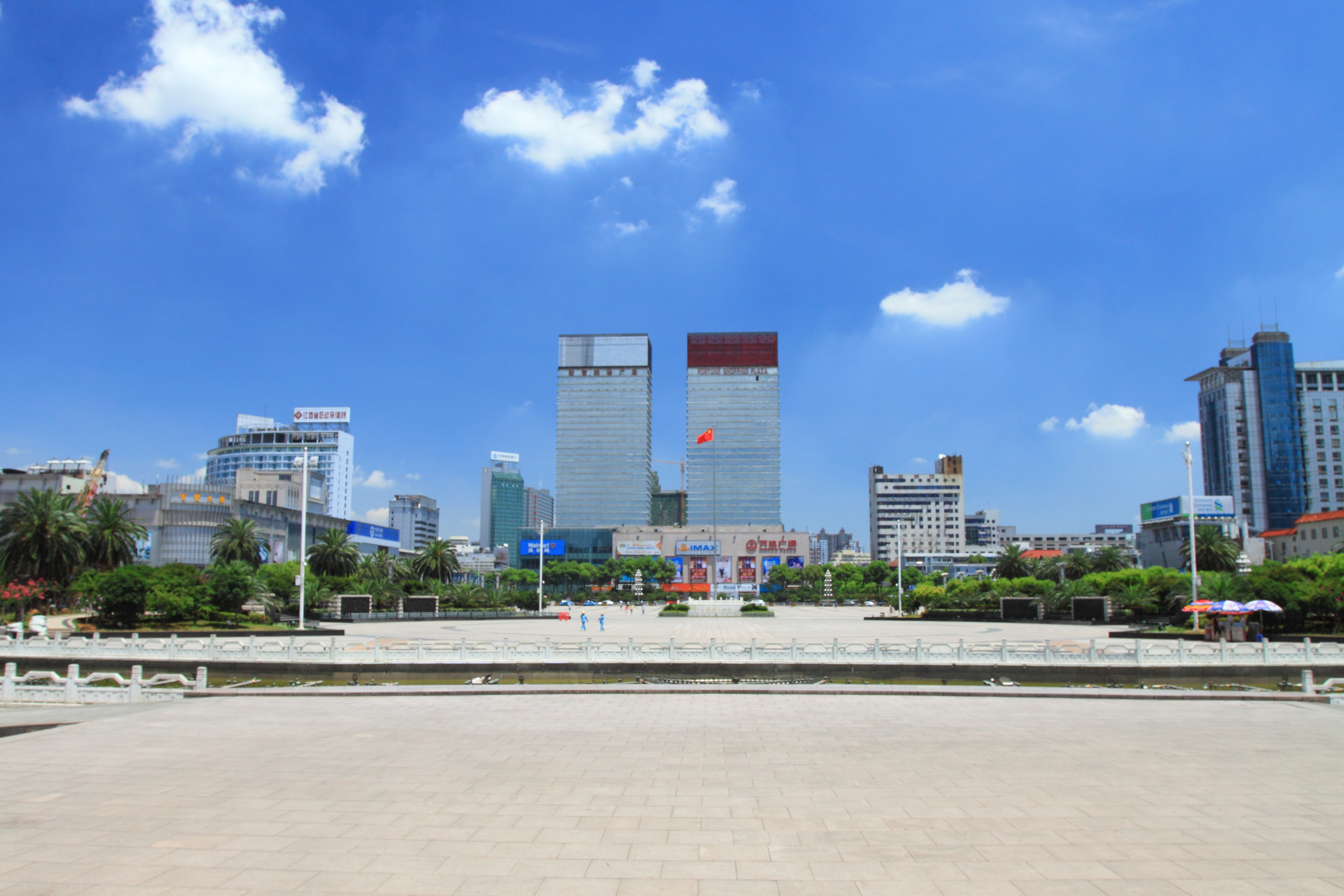
northern part

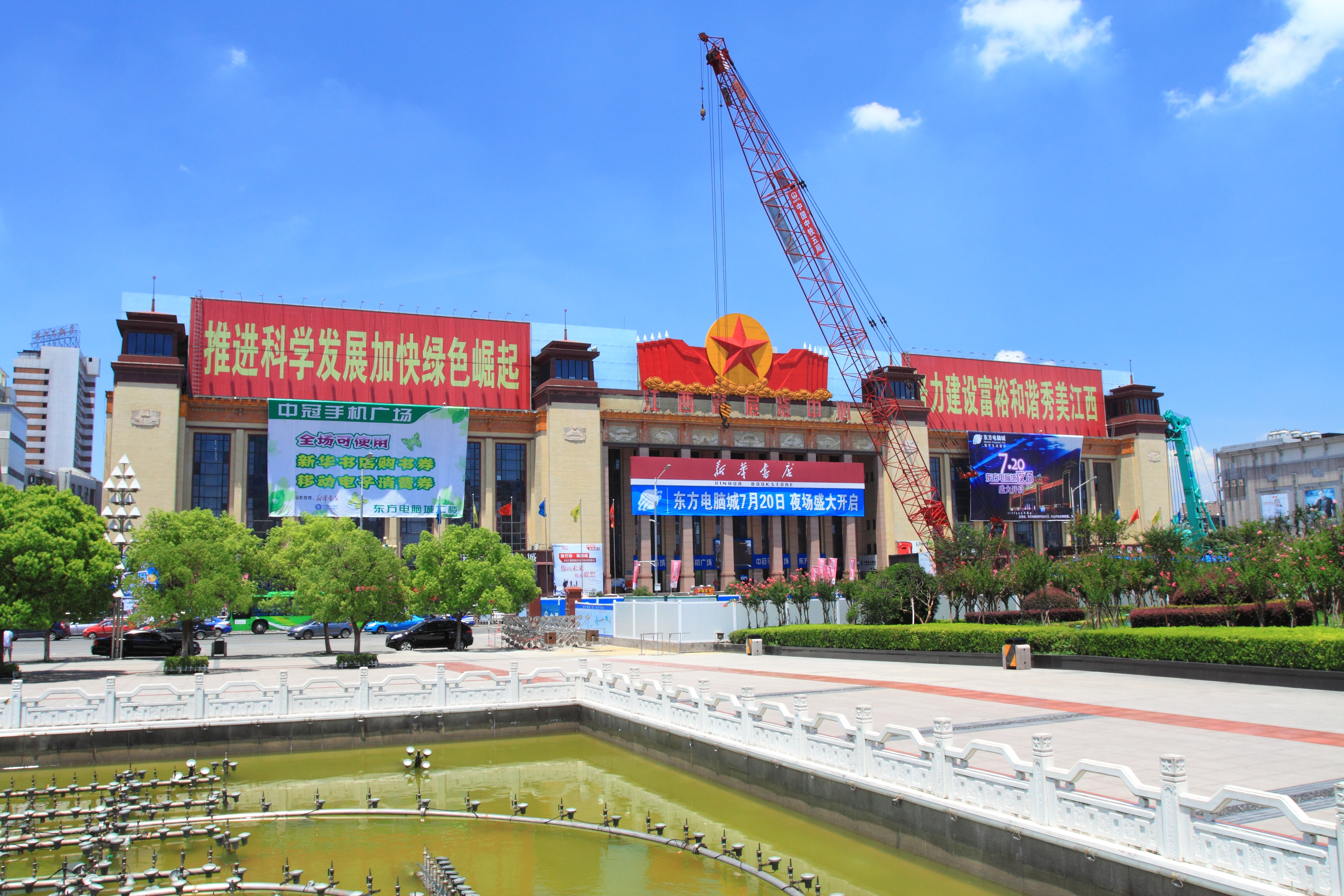
western part
