= Universitetskaya Square =

Square in Moscow, Russia

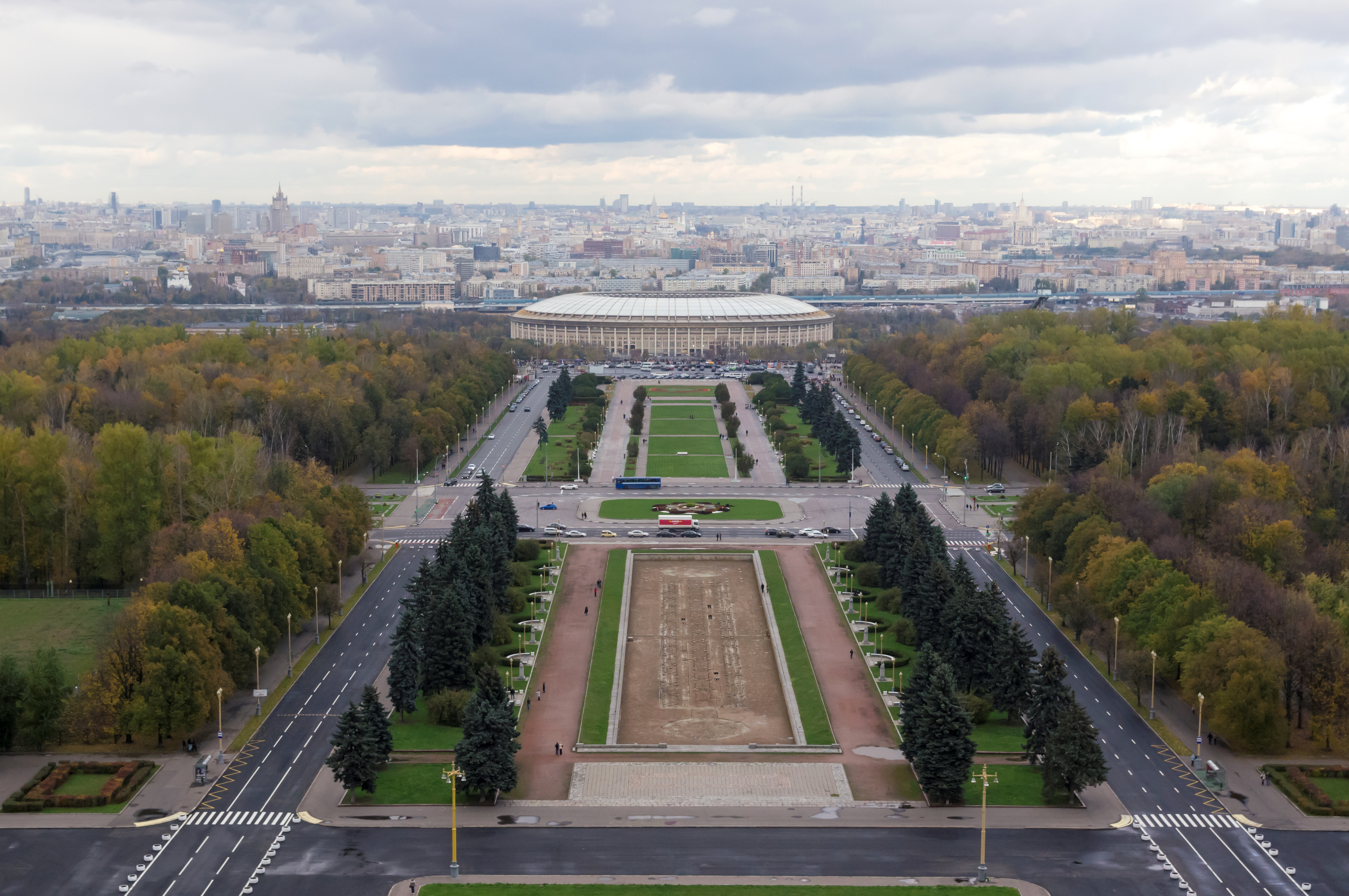
- View of Universitetskaya Square from Main building of Moscow State University
- Interactive map of Universitetskaya Square
- Native name: Университетская площадь (Russian)
- Location: Moscow; Western Administrative Okrug; Ramenki District
- Nearest metro station: Vorobyovy Gory; Universitet
- Coordinates: 55.70662°N 37.53745°E

Universitetskaya Square (Russian: Университетская площадь) is a big open space in front of the Moscow State University on Sparrow Hills in Ramenki district, in the southwest of Moscow. It is one of the biggest squares in the world, covering an area of approximately 130,000 m^{2}. The square was created during the construction of new territory of Moscow State University in 1949–1953 and got its name in 1956.
