= Place des Quinconces =

City square in Bordeaux, France

Coordinates: 44°50′44″N 0°34′25″W

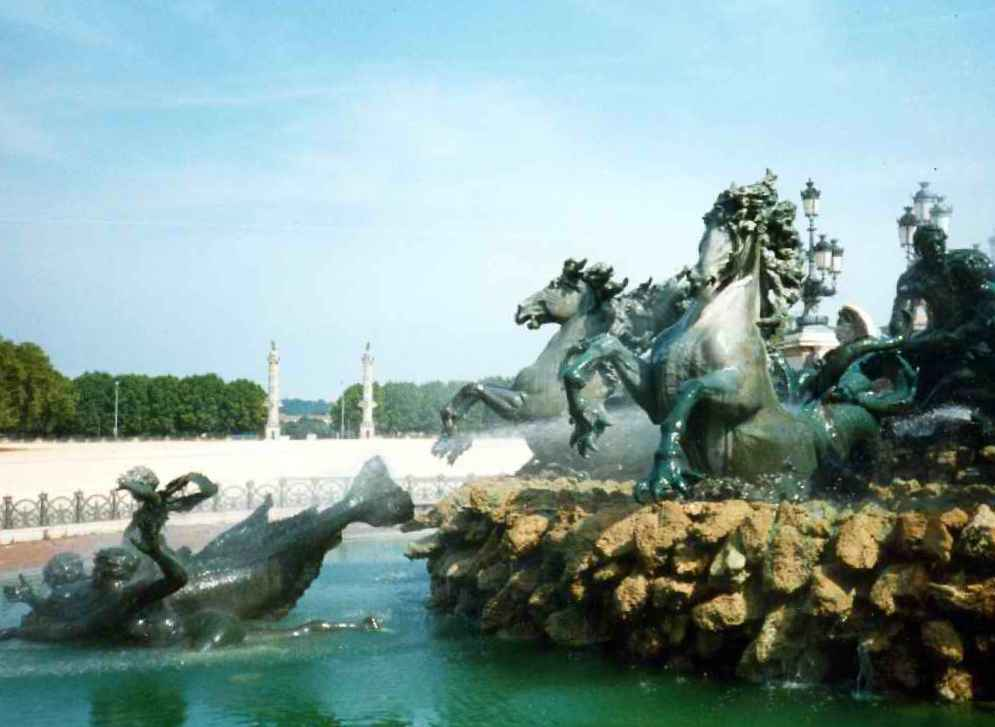
Place des Quinconces

The Place des Quinconces, located in Bordeaux, France, is among the largest city squares in Europe (approximately 63 ac or 25.6 ha).

It was laid out in 1820 on the site of Château Trompette and was intended to prevent rebellion against the city. Its guns were turned towards the centre. Its current shape (lengthened rectangle rounded off with a semicircle) was adopted in 1816. Trees were planted (in quincunxes, hence the name of the square) in 1818.

With the installation of a tram system in 2003, the place has become the most important public transport hub of the area, with Quinconces tram stop serving three tram lines, 21 bus lines (including 3 night buses), an electric shuttle, and 12 coach lines through Gironde as well as a reception area in the south.

== Sculptures ==
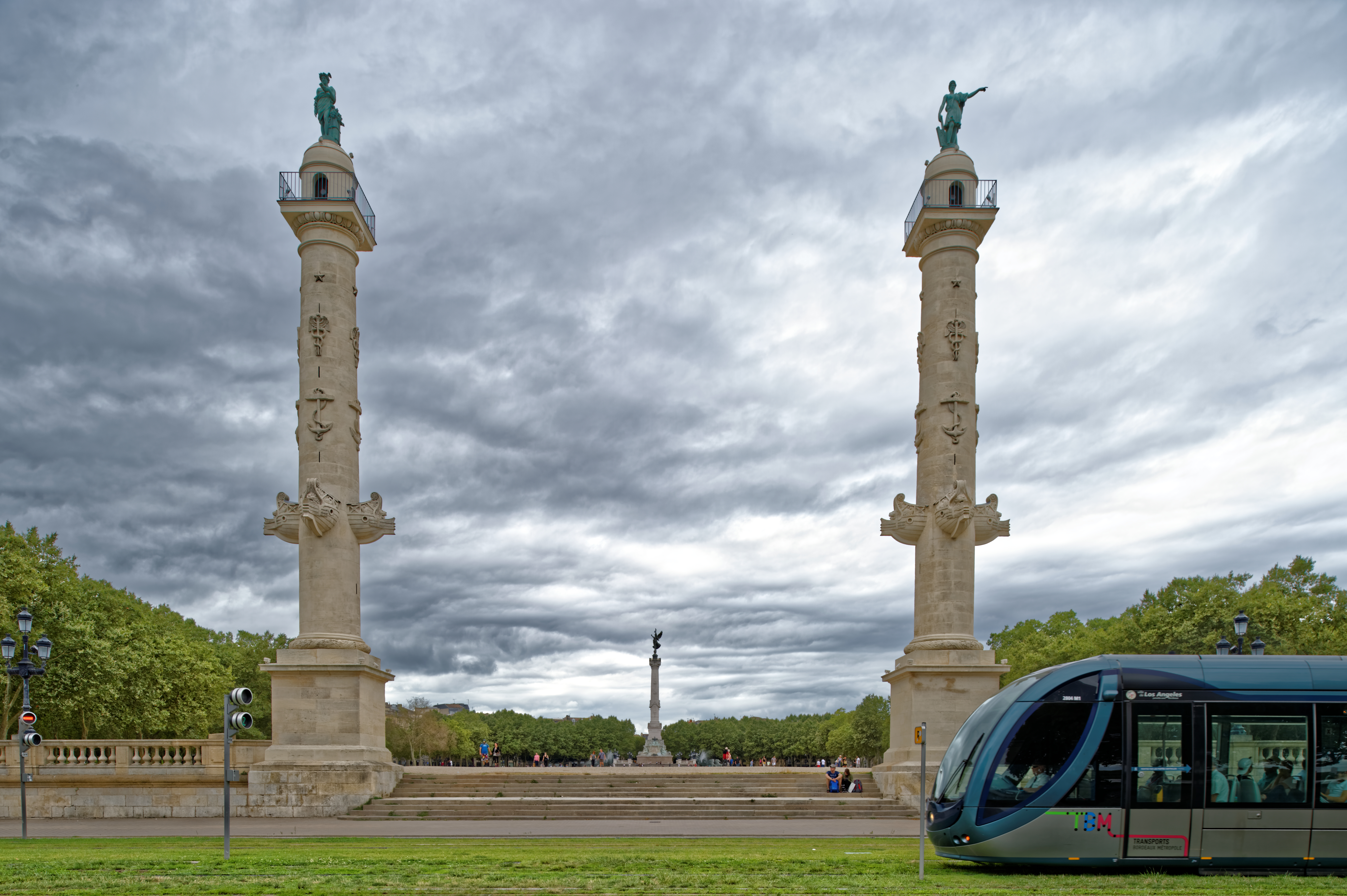
The two rostral columns

The two 21-metre (69 ft) rostral columns facing the Garonne were erected by Henri-Louis Duhamel du Monceau in 1829. One of them symbolises commerce, and the other stands for navigation. The white-marble statues of Michel de Montaigne and Charles de Secondat, baron de Montesquieu (by sculptor Dominique Fortuné Magges]) were added in 1858.

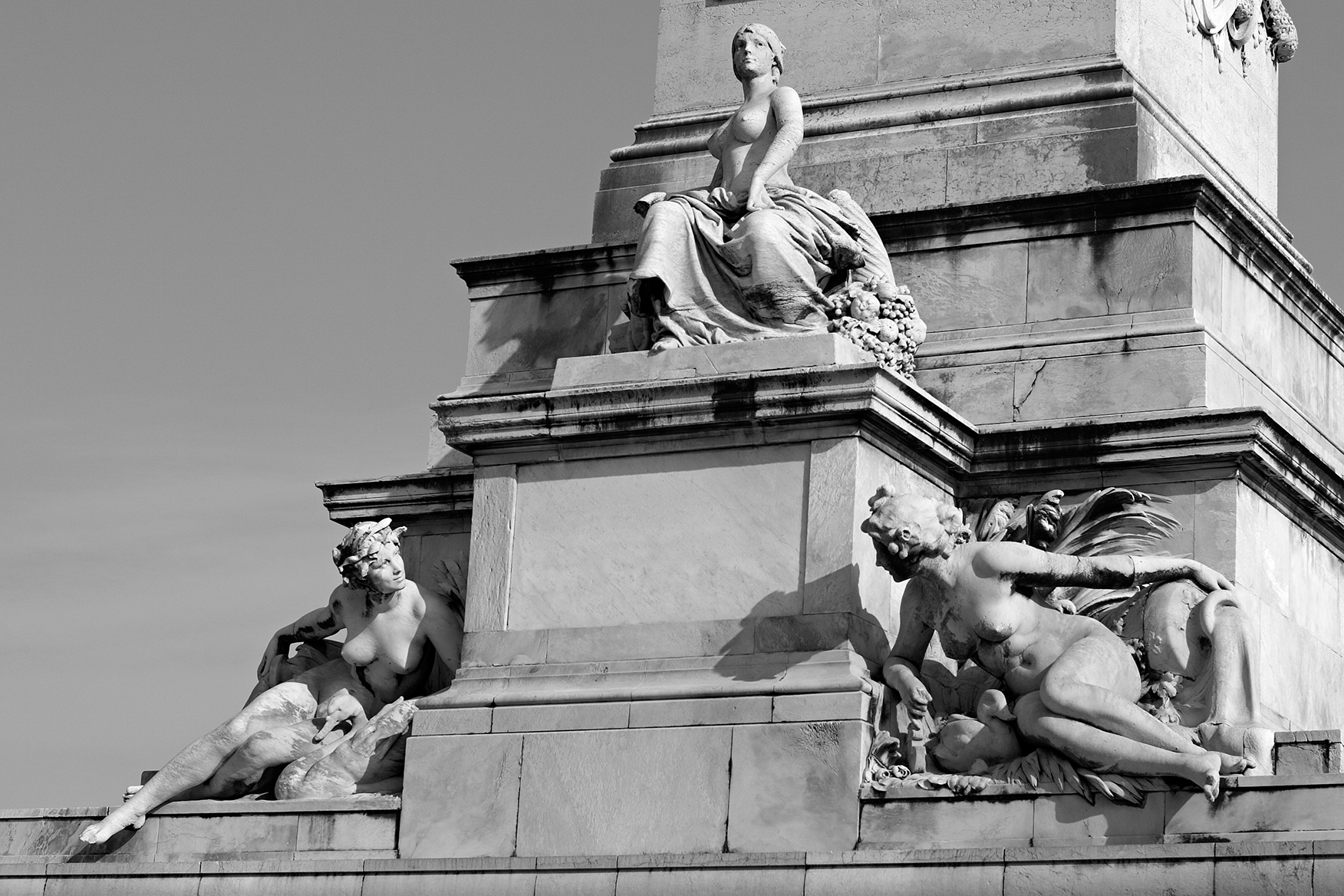
The Girondists monument

The principal monument, the 54-meter-tall Monument aux Girondins, was erected between 1894 and 1902, in memory of the Girondists who fell victim of the Reign of Terror during the French Revolution. It has a large pedestal framed with two basins, decorated with bronze horses and troops, and surmounted by a large column with a statue on top to represent the spirit of liberty breaking her chains and holding the palm of victory. Just below the statue on each of the 4 sides are the letter "G" for the Girondins, and crescents for the "Port de la Lune" (Port of the Moon) symbolising the crescent-shaped curve of the river.

Among the sculptures are:

- towards the large theatre: triumph of the Republic
- towards Chartrons: triumph of the Concorde
- towards the river: the Tribune with the French cockerel; to its right, History, and on its left, the Éloquence (2 seated people).
- towards the Tourny square: the city of Bordeaux sitting on the prow of a ship with a cornucopia. Her scepter signifying the power of maritime trade. To the right of the base: the river Dordogne and to the left the Garonne.

At the feet of the "Triumph of the Republique": Ignorance veiling his face, Lies with his mask, and Vice with his pig ears. The crowned figure riding the chariot represents the Republic. She holds a scepter to symbolize power, military and civil. In her other hand is a globe which used to have three figurines representing Freedom, Equality, and Fraternity. These have disappeared and were said to have been stolen and resold to a rich American collector. On the right are three cherubs: one reading a book, one with a globe, one reciting the alphabet to represent public education. On the left is a lictor, a gunner, and a standard bearer to represent military service. At their feet are a forger holding a hammer and personifying Labor. Next to him, a woman lying down hold a sword to symbolize Security. The lion represents Force. The horses pulling the chariot have fins and tails because in order to spread the values of the Republic, they must be able to travel across land and sea.

At the feet of the Triumph of Concord": A family with the child riding on a sturgeon, representing Happiness. The three children represent the Arts and Sciences. Painting with its palette, Sculpture with its mallet, and Music with its lyre. Music crowns the painting to represent the Neoplatonic theories that the planets are governed by harmony and without it, the planets would collide. Therefore, the universe is a music. Concord holds an olive branch to symbolize Peace. Before her are a worker and a city dweller, hand in hand, to represent social reconciliation. Beside them, the woman sowing flowers is Abundance to show how in the republican harmony, people prosper. Wine trade is shown by the child on a barrel holding the caduceus of Hermes the god of commerce. The other two children count on their fingers to plan a future business. The column was erected by Achille Dumilatre and architect Victor Rich. The pedestal is by Corgolin. Felix Sharpantie and Gustav Debri created the sculpture groups with the latter responsible for the sea horses.

During the 1942 German occupation of France in World War II, the Nazis removed the statues from the fountain to make cannons and destroyed other parts of the monument. The statues were located two years later in Angers and restored and re-erected in 1983. The Girondin memorial was renovated in 2004 and declared a historical monument on March 16, 2011. The names of deputies to the National Convention executed during the Terror who hailed from the Gironde department were added in 1989.

== Gallery ==
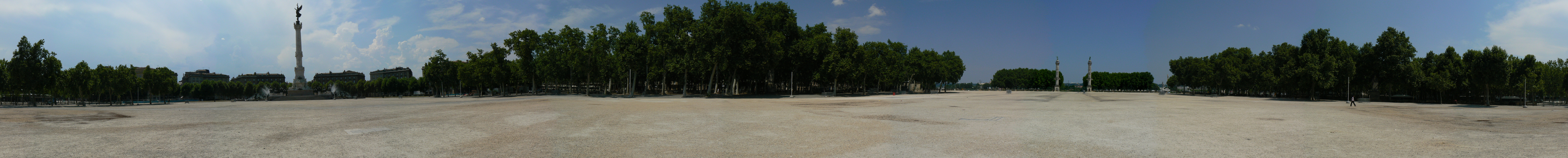
Panorama of the Place des Quinconces
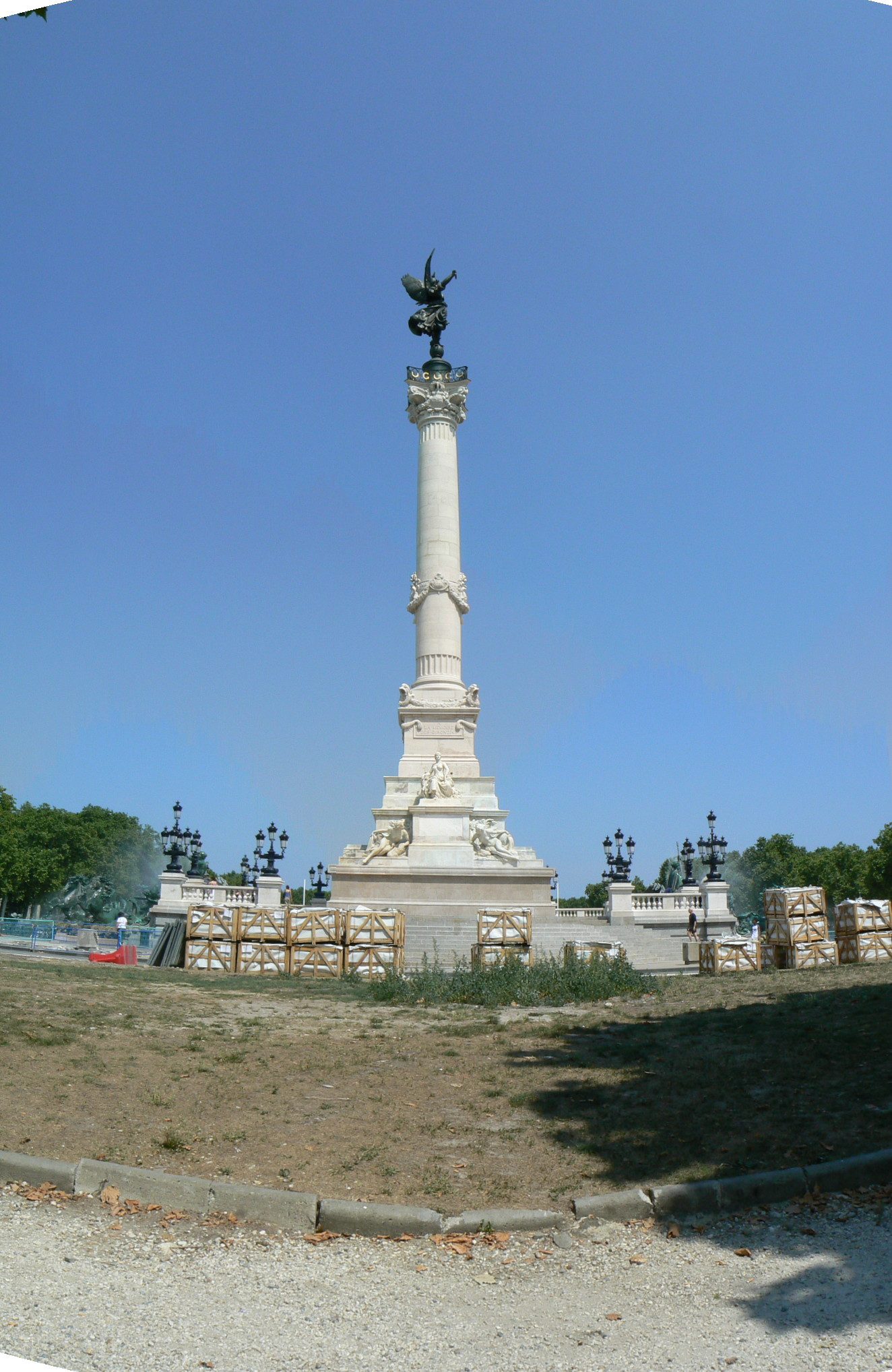
The column by Dumilatre and Rich

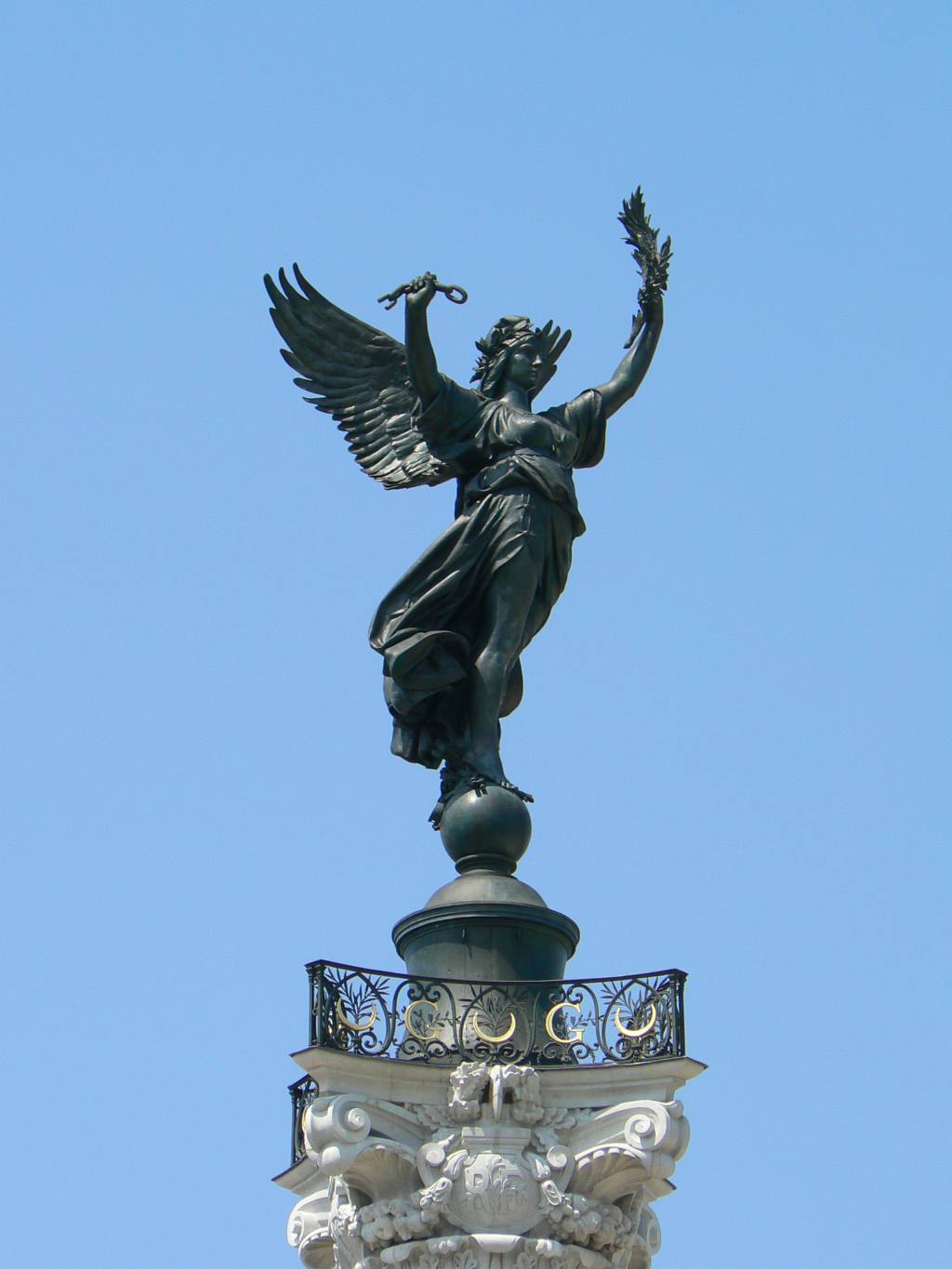
Statue on top of the column

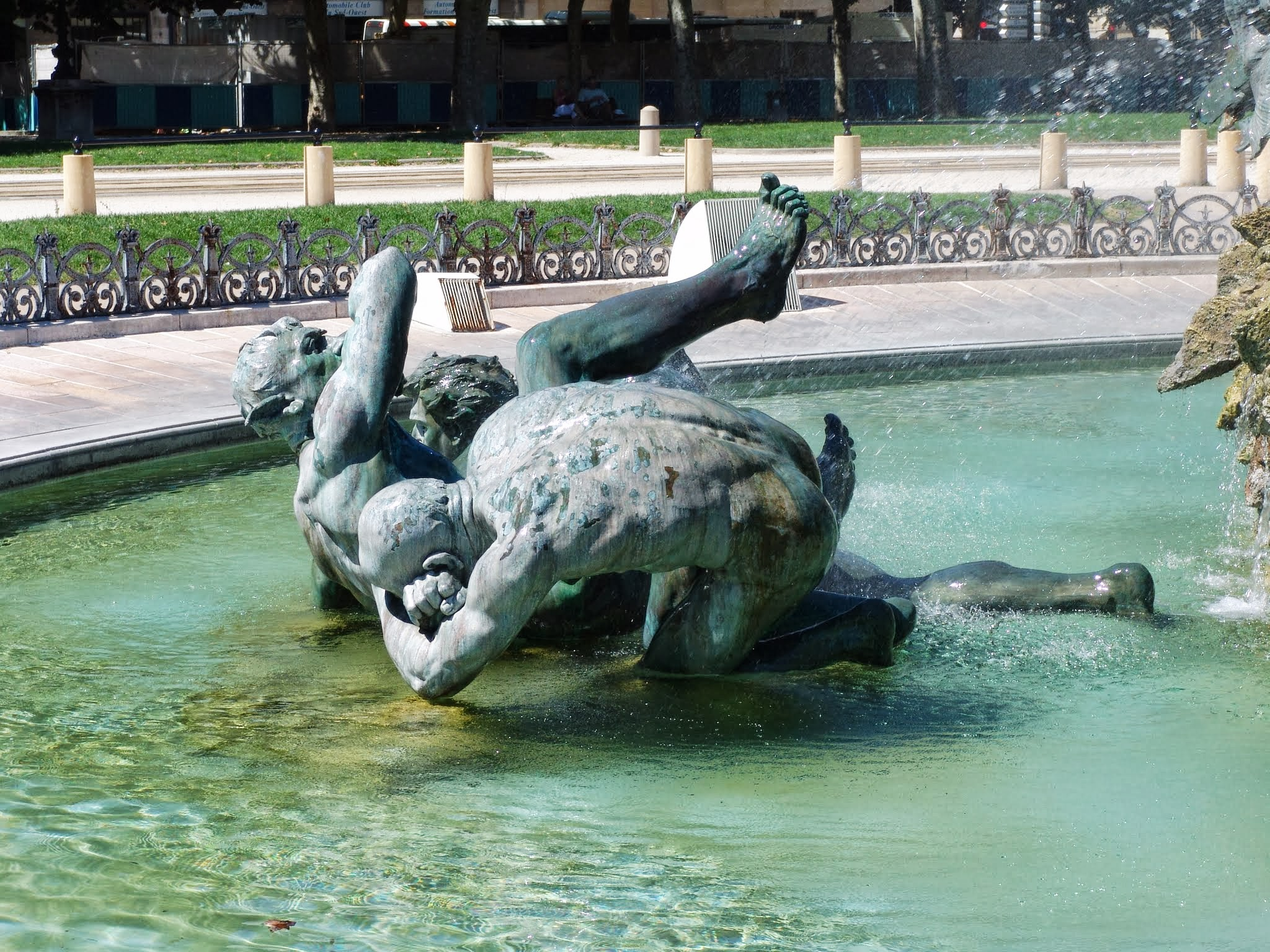
Sculpture of suffering figures

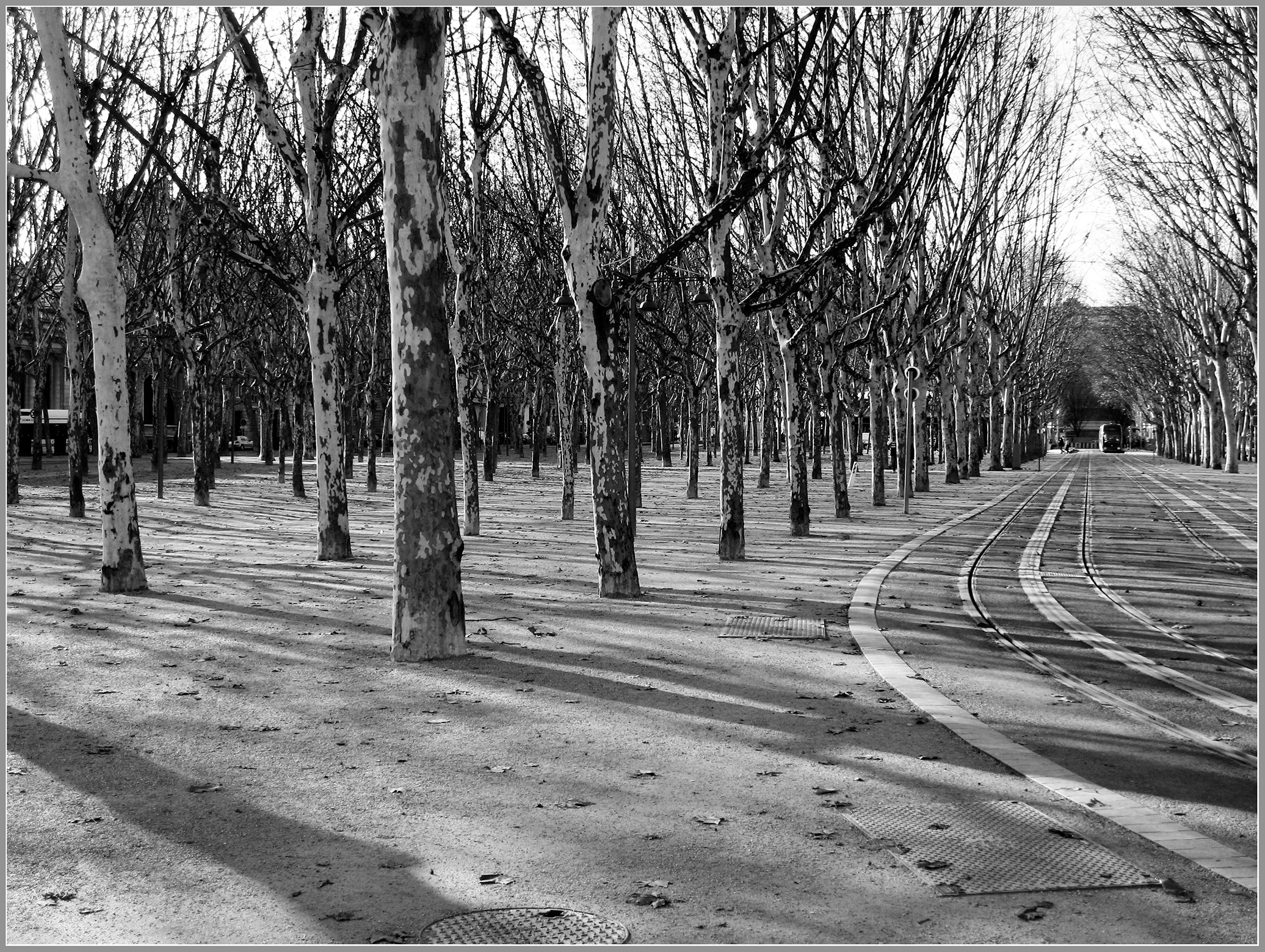
Trees of the Place des Quinconces

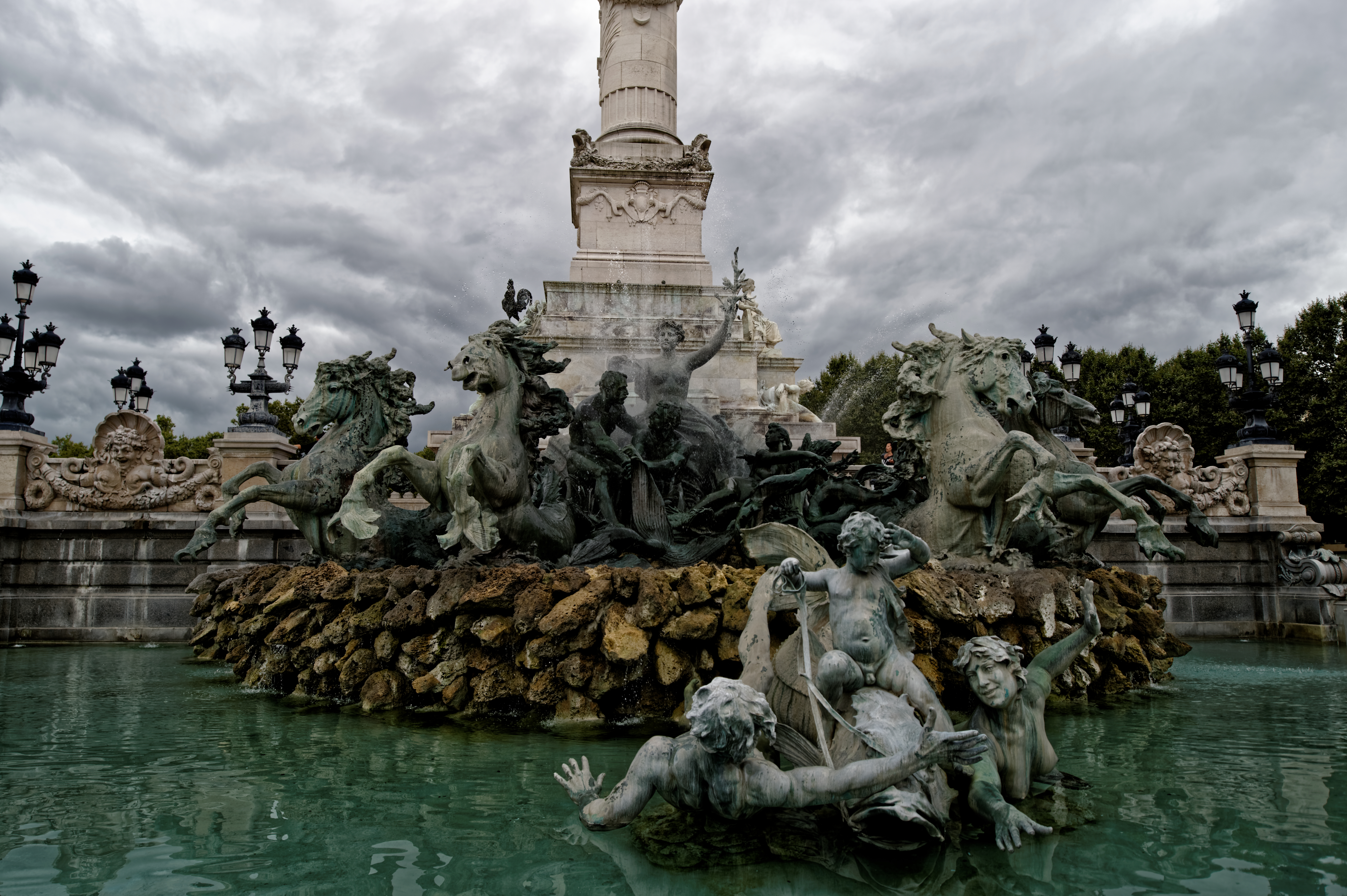
Monument aux Girondins, fountain (detail)

== See also ==
- Place de la Concorde
- List of city squares (by size)
