= Araguaia Palace =

Coordinates: 10°11′05″S 48°20′01″W

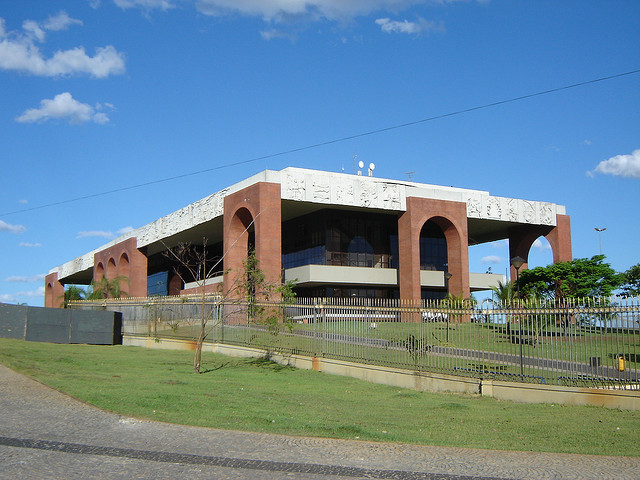
Palácio do Araguaia

The Araguaia Palace is the seat of government of the Brazilian state of Tocantins. It is located in the city of Palmas, the state capital and its largest city. It was inaugurated on March 9, 1991. The palace is located at the Sunflower Square.

Headquarters of the state executive power, the Araguaia Palace is a landmark from which they were designed streets and avenues of the capital. It is situated in the center of the master plan and occupies a floor area of 14 square meters. Impressive, with four floors, one basement. Its arches are a historical reference to the Church of Our Lady of the Rosary of the Blacks in Natividade. Bold architecture, the Araguaia Palace is the main postcard of Palmas, and monitors the project of modernity from the capital of Tocantins.
