= Roman Square (Podgorica) =

Square in Podgorica, Montenegro

Coordinates: 42.442568°N 19.246542°E

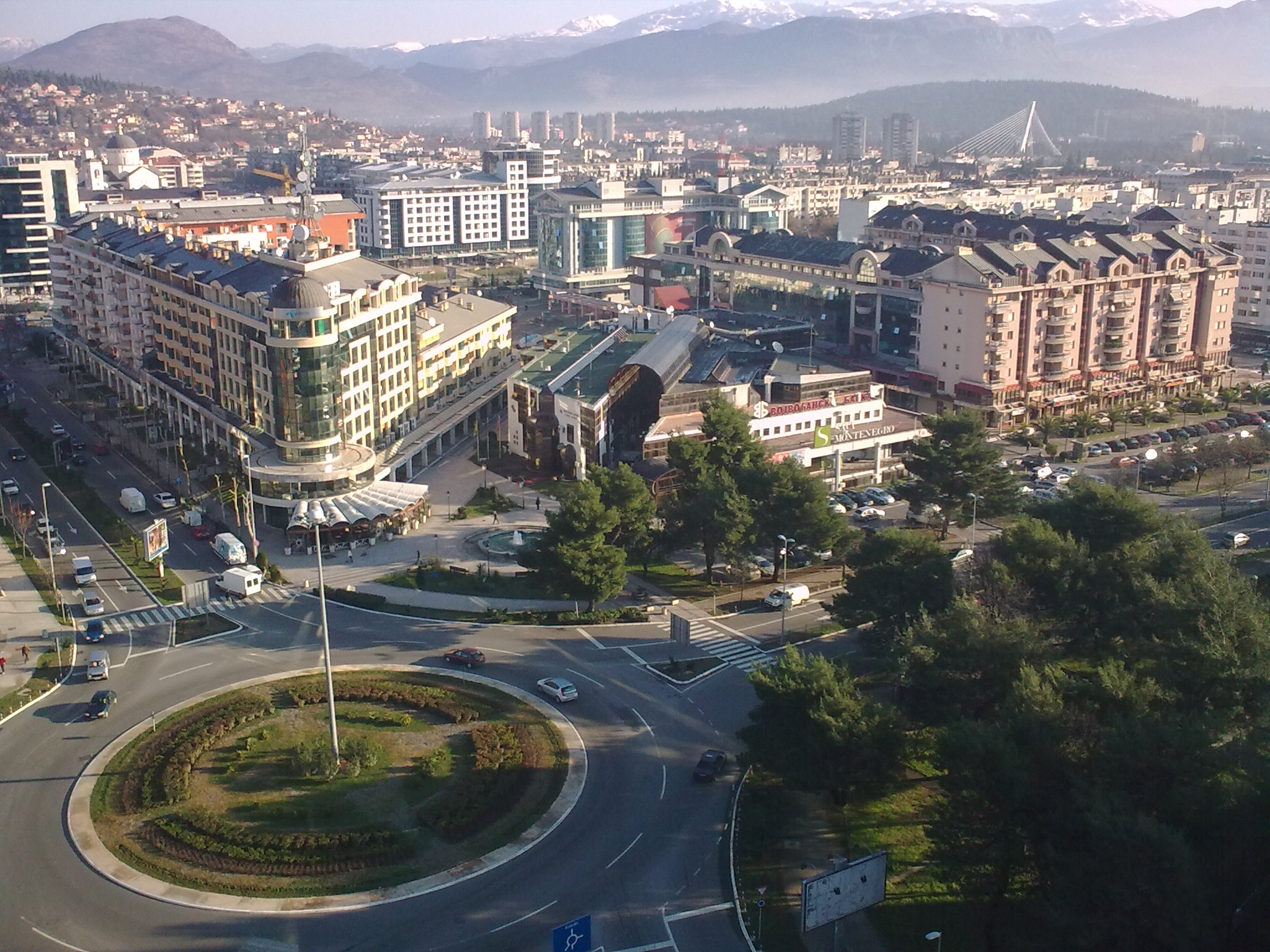
A view towards Rimski Trg

The Roman Square (Serbian: Римски трг, romanized: Rimski trg) is a town square in Podgorica, Montenegro. It's the town's major business district and boasts some of the highest real-estate prices in Podgorica. The Roman Square is colloquially known as Vektra Square (Serbian: Трг Вектре, romanized: Trg Vektre), owing its name to the Vektra business centre, the first major building on the square.

== Location ==
The square is bordered by Moskovska ulica (Moscow street) to the east and George Washington boulevard to the west. Saint Peter of Cetinje boulevard and Bulevar Revolucije (Revolution boulevard) create the square's northern and southern borders, respectively. Rimski Trg is connected to the Cathedral of the Resurrection of Christ and Maxim business centre with an underground pedestrian passage, going under the St. Peter of Cetinje boulevard. The underground passage is currently the only one in the city.

== Characteristics ==
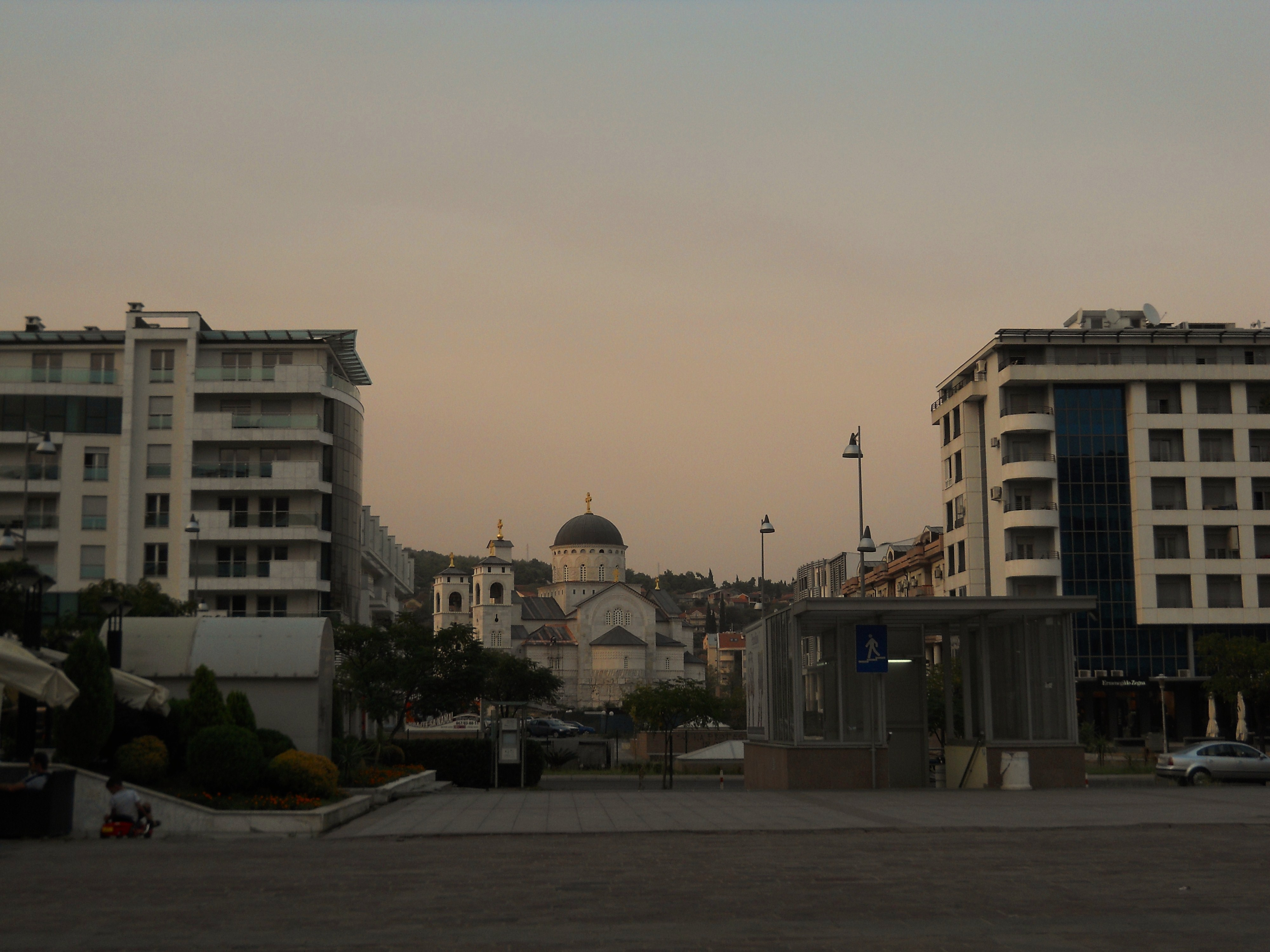
Cathedral of the Resurrection of Christ, viewed from Rimski trg

The square is built around a large central fountain, and covers an area of 20.000 square metres. Along with numerous café's and restaurants, it also hosts the following buildings:

- Business centre Vektra
- Best Western Premier Hotel Montenegro
- Telenor Montenegro headquarters
- Crnogorski Telekom and T-Mobile Montenegro headquarters
- Business centre Kruševac
- Prva Banka, CKB and Addiko Bank headquarters
- Montenegrin Electrical Transmission System dispatching centre

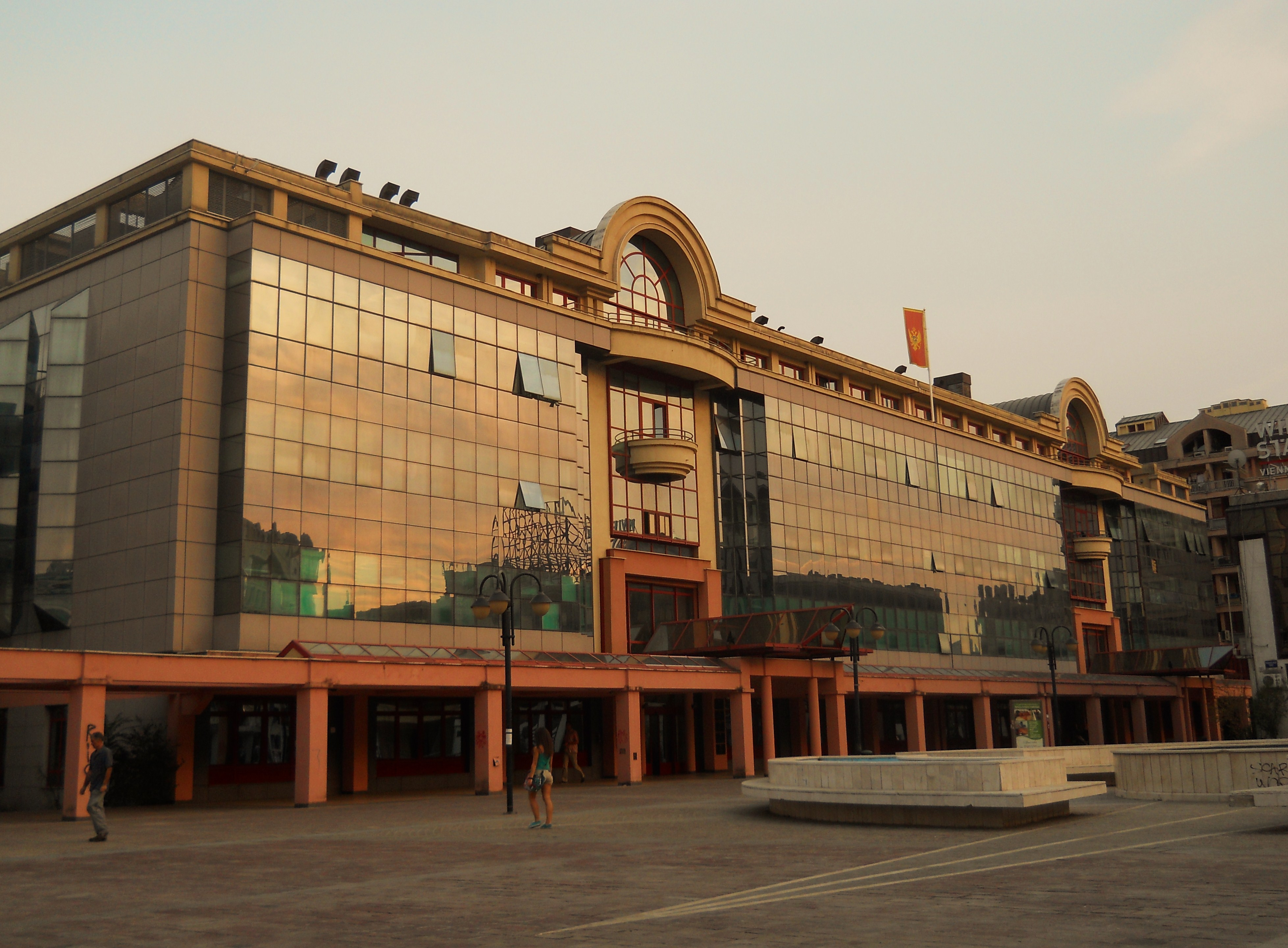
The government institutions building

The following government ministries are (at least partially) located on the square:

- Ministry of Economy
- Ministry of Science
- Ministry of Education and Sport
- Ministry of Labor and Social Welfare
- Ministry of Information Society and Telecommunications
- Ministry of Minority Rights
- Ministry of Health
- Ministry of Agriculture and Rural Development
- Ministry of Transportation and Maritime Affairs
