= List of township-level divisions of Jiangxi =

Location of Jiangxi province in China

This is a list of township-level divisions of the province of Jiangxi, People's Republic of China (PRC). After province, prefecture, and county-level divisions, township-level divisions constitute the formal fourth-level administrative divisions of the PRC. This list is divided first into the prefecture-level then the county-level divisions.

== Nanchang ==
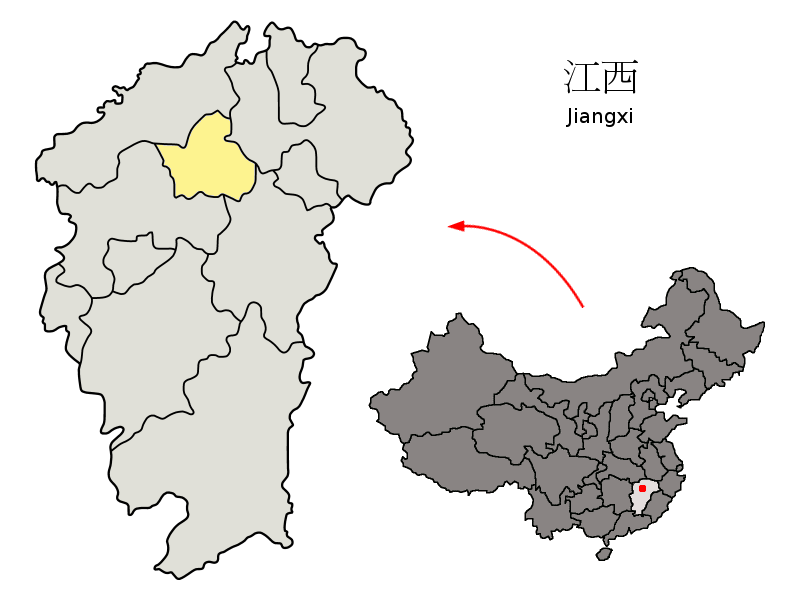
Location of Nanchang in the province

=== Donghu District ===
Subdistricts:

- Gongyuan Subdistrict (公园街道), Tengwangge Subdistrict (滕王阁街道), Bayiqiao Subdistrict (八一桥街道), Baihuazhou Subdistrict (百花洲街道), Dunzitang Subdistrict (墩子塘街道), Dayuan Subdistrict (大院街道), Yuzhang Subdistrict (豫章街道), Dongjiayao Subdistrict (董家窑街道), Pengjiaqiao Subdistrict (彭家桥街道), Shajing Subdistrict (沙井街道)

=== Honggutan District ===
Subdistricts:

- Shajing (沙井街道), Weidong (卫东街道)

Towns:

- Shengmi (生米镇)

Management offices:

- Fenghuang Zhou (凤凰洲管理处), Hongjue Zhou (红角洲管理处), Jiulong Hu (九龙湖管理处)

=== Qingshanhu District ===
Subdistricts:

- Qingshan Road Subdistrict (青山路街道), Shanghai Road Subdistrict (上海路街道), Nangang Subdistrict (南钢街道)

Towns:

- Jingdong (京东镇), Luojia (罗家镇), Hufang (湖坊镇), Tangshan (塘山镇), Yangzizhou (扬子洲镇), Jiaoqiao (蛟桥镇)

=== Qingyunpu District ===
Subdistricts:

- Hongdu Subdistrict (洪都街道), Jingshan Subdistrict (京山街道), Sanjiadian Subdistrict (三家店街道), Daishan Subdistrict (岱山街道), Xujiafang Subdistrict (徐家坊街道)

The only town is Qingyunpu Town (青云谱镇)

=== Wanli District ===
Subdistricts:

- Zhanqian Subdistrict (站前街道), Xingfu Subdistrict (幸福街道)

Towns:

- Zhaoxian (招贤镇), Meiling (梅岭镇), Luoting (罗亭镇), Taiping (太平镇)

=== Xihu District ===
Subdistricts:

- Nanpu Subdistrict (南浦街道), Chaoyangzhou Subdistrict (朝阳洲街道), Guangrunmen Subdistrict (广润门街道), Xihu Subdistrict (西湖街道), Ximazhuang Subdistrict (系马桩街道), Shengjinta Subdistrict (绳金塔街道), Dinggong Road Subdistrict (丁公路街道), Nanzhan Subdistrict (南站街道), Taoyuan Subdistrict (桃源街道), Shizi Avenue Subdistrict (十字街街道)

The only town is Taohua (桃花镇)

=== Anyi County ===
Towns:

- Longjin (龙津镇), Wanbu (万埠镇), Shibi (石鼻镇), Dinghu (鼎湖镇), Changbu (长埠镇), Dongyang (东阳镇), Huangzhou (黄洲镇)

Townships:

- Qiaole Township (乔乐乡), Changjun Township (长均乡), Xinmin Township (新民乡)

=== Jinxian County ===
Towns:

- Minhe (民和镇), Lidu (李渡镇), Wenzhen (温圳镇), Wengang (文港镇), Meizhuang (梅庄镇), Zhanggong (张公镇), Luoxi (罗溪镇), Jiaqiao (架桥镇), Qianfang (前坊镇)

Townships:

- Sanli Township (三里乡), Ertang Township (二塘乡), Zhongling Township (钟陵乡), Chixi Township (池溪乡), Nantai Township (南台乡), Sanyangji Township (三阳集乡), Qili Township (七里乡), Xiabuji Township (下埠集乡), Yaqian Township (衙前乡), Baixu Township (白圩乡), Changshanyan Township (长山晏乡), Quanling Township (泉岭乡)

=== Nanchang County ===
Towns:

- Liantang (莲塘镇), Xiangtang (向塘镇), Sanjiang (三江镇), Tangnan (塘南镇), Youlan (幽兰镇), Jiangxiang (蒋巷镇), Wuyang (武阳镇), Gangshang (冈上镇), Guangfu (广福镇), Changdong (昌东镇), Maqiu (麻丘镇)

Townships:

- Jingkou Township (泾口乡), Nanxin Township (南新乡), Tacheng Township (塔城乡), Huangma Township (黄马乡), Fushan Township (富山乡), Dongxin Township (东新乡), Bayi Township (八一乡)

=== Xinjian County ===
Towns:

- Changpo (长堎镇), Wangcheng (望城镇), Shengmi (生米镇), Xishan (西山镇), Shigang (石岗镇), Songhu (松湖镇), Qiaohe (樵舍镇), Lehua (乐化镇), Xixia (溪霞镇), Xiangshan (象山镇), Shibu (石埠镇), Lianwei (联圩镇)

Townships:

- Liuhu Township (流湖乡), Houtian Township (厚田乡), Jinqiao Township (金桥乡), Tiehe Township (铁河乡), Datangping Township (大塘坪乡), Changyi Township (昌邑乡), Nanji Township (南矶乡)

== Fuzhou ==
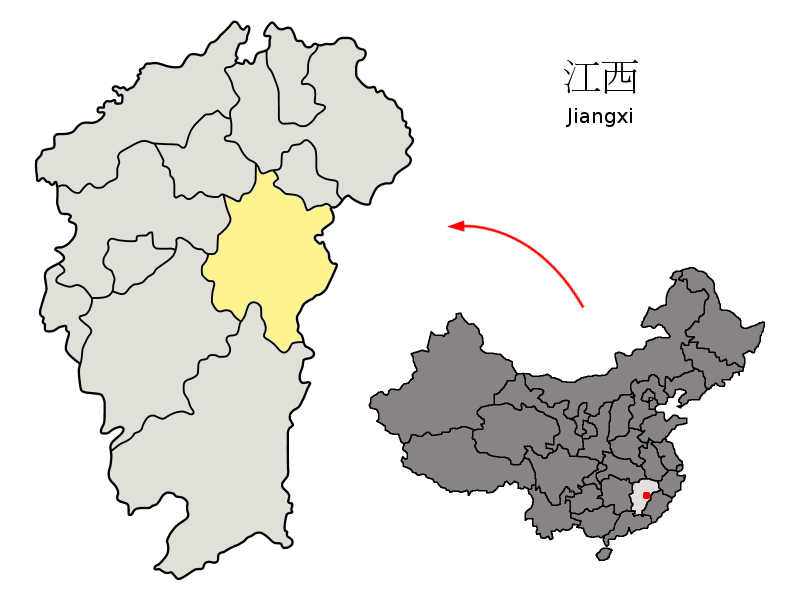
Location of Fuzhou in the province

=== Linchuan District ===
Subdistricts:

- Qingyun Subdistrict (青云街道), Xidajie Subdistrict (西大街街道), Jinggong Road Subdistrict (荆公路街道), Liushuiqiao Subdistrict (六水桥街道), Wenchang Subdistrict (文昌街道), Chengxi Subdistrict (城西街道), Zhongling Subdistrict (钟岭街道)

Towns:

- Shangdundu (上顿渡镇), Wenquan (温泉镇), Gaoping (高坪镇), Qiuxi (秋溪镇), Rongshan (荣山镇), Longxi (龙溪镇), Dagang (大岗镇), Yunshan (云山镇), Changkai (唱凯镇), Luozhen (罗针镇), Luohu (罗湖镇), Taiyang (太阳镇), Dongguan (东馆镇), Tengqiao (腾桥镇), Qingni (青泥镇), Xiaoqiao (孝桥镇), Fubei (抚北镇), Chonggang (崇岗镇)

Townships:

- Zhanping Township (展坪乡), Liancheng Township (连城乡), Tongyuan Township (桐源乡), Hunan Township (湖南乡), Pengtian Township (鹏田乡), Maopai Township (茅排乡), Hebu Township (河埠乡)

=== Chongren County ===
Towns:

- Bashan (巴山镇), Xiangshan (相山镇), Hangbu (航埠镇), Sunfang (孙坊镇), Heshang (河上镇), Libei (礼陂镇), Ma'an (马鞍镇)

Townships:

- Shizhuang Township (石庄乡), Liujiaqiao Township (六家桥乡), Bailu Township (白路乡), Sanshan Township (三山乡), Baibei Township (白陂乡), Taoyuan Township (桃源乡), Xufang Township (许坊乡), Guowei Township (郭圩乡)

=== Dongxiang County ===
Towns:

- Xiaogang (孝岗镇), Xiaohuang (小璜镇), Weishangqiao (圩上桥镇), Maxu (马圩镇), Zhanxu (詹圩镇), Gangshangji (岗上积镇), Yangqiaodian (杨桥殿镇), Lixu (黎圩镇), Wangqiao (王桥镇)

Townships:

- Pogan Township (珀玕乡), Dengjia Township (邓家乡), Pogan Township (珀玕乡), Huwei Township (虎圩乡), Yaowei Township (瑶圩乡)

=== Guangchang County ===
Towns:

- Wangjiang (旺江镇), Toupei (头陂镇), Chishui (赤水镇), Yiqian (驿前镇), Ganzhu (甘竹镇)

Townships:

- Qianshan Township (千善乡), Shuinanwei Township (水南圩乡), Changqiao Township (长桥乡), Yangxi Township (杨溪乡), Jianfeng Township (尖峰乡), Tangfang Township (塘坊乡)

=== Jinxi County ===
Towns:

- Xiugu (秀谷镇), Huwan (浒湾镇), Shuangtang (双塘镇), Heyuan (何源镇), Heshi (合市镇), Langju (琅琚镇), Zuofang (左坊镇)

Townships:

- Huangtong Township (黄通乡), Duiqiao Township (对桥乡), Lufang Township (陆坊乡), Chenfangji Township (陈坊积乡), Boli Township (玻璃乡), Shimen Township (石门乡)

=== Le'an County ===
Towns:

- Aoxi (鳌溪镇), Gongxi (公溪镇), Shandang (山砀镇), Gongfang (龚坊镇), Daifang (戴坊镇), Niutian (牛田镇), Wanchong (万崇镇), Zengtian (增田镇), Zhaoxie (招携镇)

Townships:

- Huxi Township (湖溪乡), Luobei Township (罗陂乡), Huping Township (湖坪乡), Nancun Township (南村乡), Gugang Township (谷岗乡), Jinzhu She Ethnic Township (金竹畲族乡)

=== Lichuan County ===
Towns:

- Rifeng (日峰镇), Hongcun (宏村镇), Xunkou (洵口镇), Xiongcun (熊村镇), Long'an (龙安镇), Desheng (德胜镇)

Townships:

- Tanxi Township (潭溪乡), Hufang Township (湖坊乡), Heyuan Township (荷源乡), Houcun Township (厚村乡), Sheping Township (社萍乡), Zhangxi Township (樟溪乡), Xicheng Township (西城乡), Zhongtian Township (中田乡)

=== Nancheng County ===
Towns:

- Jianchang (建昌镇), Zhuliang (株良镇), Shangtang (上唐镇), Lita (里塔镇), Hongmen (洪门镇), Shazhou (沙洲镇), Longhu (龙湖镇), Xinfengjie (新丰街镇), Wanfang (万坊镇)

Townships:

- Xujia Township (徐家乡), Tianjingyuan Township (天井源乡), Xunxi Township (浔溪乡)

=== Nanfeng County ===
Towns:

- Qincheng (琴城镇), Taihe (太和镇), Baishe (白舍镇), Shishan (市山镇), Qiawan (洽湾镇), Sangtian (桑田镇), Zixiao (紫霄镇)

Townships:

- Sanxi Township (三溪乡), Dongping Township (东坪乡), Laixi Township (莱溪乡), Taiyuan Township (太源乡), Fufang Township (傅坊乡)

=== Yihuang County ===
Towns:

- Fenggang (凤冈镇), Tangyin (棠阴镇), Huangpi (黄陂镇), Dongpo (东陂镇), Lixi (梨溪镇), Erdu (二都镇), Zhonggang (中港镇)

Townships:

- Xinfeng Township (新丰乡), Shengang Township (神冈乡), Zhenkou Township (圳口乡), Nanyuan Township (南源乡), Taobei Township (桃陂乡)

=== Zixi County ===
Towns:

- Hecheng (鹤城镇), Matoushan (马头山镇), Gaobu (高埠镇), Songshi (嵩市镇), Wushi (乌石镇)

Townships:

- Gaotian Township (高田乡), Shixia Township (石峡乡)

== Ganzhou ==
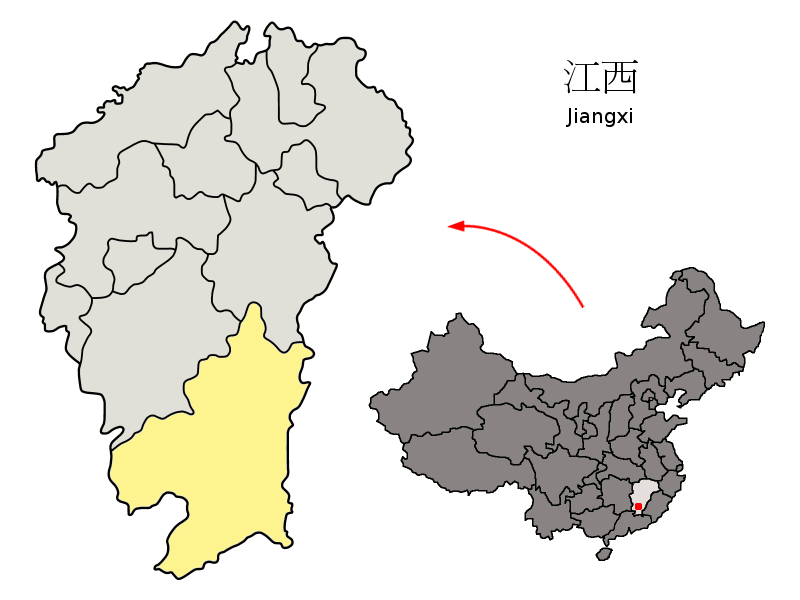
Location of Ganzhou in the province

=== Zhanggong District ===
Subdistricts:

- Jiefang Subdistrict (解放街道), Ganjiang Subdistrict (赣江街道), Nanwai Subdistrict (南外街道), Dongwai Subdistrict (东外街道), Huangjinling Subdistrict (黄金岭街道)

Towns:

- Shashi (砂石镇), Shuidong (水东镇), Shuinan (水南镇), Hubian (湖边镇), Shahe (沙河镇), Shuixi (水西镇), Panlong (蟠龙镇)

=== Nankang District ===
Subdistricts:

- Rongjiang Subdistrict (蓉江街道), Dongshan Subdistrict (东山街道)

Towns:

- Tangjiang (唐江镇), Fenggang (凤岗镇), Tankou (潭口镇), Longling (龙岭镇), Longhui (龙回镇), Jingba (镜坝镇), Hengshi (横市镇), Tandong (潭东镇)

Townships:

- Fushi Township (浮石乡), Chishi She Ethnic Township (赤土畲族乡), Hengzhai Township (横寨乡), Zhufang Township (朱坊乡), Taiwo Township (太窝乡), Sanjiang Township (三江乡), Longhua Township (龙华乡), Shibatang Township (十八塘乡), Mashuang Township (麻双乡), Daping Township (大坪乡), Pingshi Township (坪市乡), Longmu Township (隆木乡)

=== Ganxian District ===
Towns:

- Meilin (梅林镇), Wangmudu (王母渡镇), Shadi (沙地镇), Jiangkou (江口镇), Tiancun (田村镇), Nantang (南塘镇), Maodian (茅店镇), Jibu (吉埠镇), Wuyun (五云镇), Hujiang (湖江镇)

Townships:

- Hanfang Township (韩坊乡), Yangbu Township (阳埠乡), Dabu Township (大埠乡), Changluo Township (长洛乡), Datian Township (大田乡), Chutan Township (储潭乡), Shiyuan Township (石芫乡), Sanxi Township (三溪乡), Bailu Township (白鹭乡)

=== Ruijin City ===
Towns:

- Xianghu (象湖镇), Ruilin (瑞林镇), Rentian (壬田镇), Jiubao (九堡镇), Shazhouba (沙洲坝镇), Xiefang (谢坊镇), Wuyang (武阳镇)

Townships:

- Yeping Township (叶岛乡), Dingpi Township (丁陂乡), Dabaidi Township (大柏地乡), Gangmian Township (岗面乡), Ridong Township (日东乡), Wantian Township (万田乡), Huangbai Township (黄柏乡), Yunshishan Township (云石山乡), Zetan Township (泽覃乡), Baying Township (拔英乡)

=== Longnan City ===
Towns:

- Longnan (龙南镇), Wudang (武当镇), Yangcun (杨村镇), Wenlong (汶龙镇), Chenglong (程龙镇), Guanxi (关西镇), Liren (里仁镇), Dujiang (渡江镇)

Townships:

- Taojiang Township (桃江乡), Dongjiang Township (东江乡), Lintang Township (临塘乡), Nanxiang Township (南享乡), Jiahu Township (夹湖乡)

=== Anyuan County ===
Towns:

- Xinshan (欣山镇), Kongtian (孔田镇), Banshi (版石镇), Tianxin (天心镇), Longbu (龙布镇), Hezi (鹤子镇), Sanbaishan (三百山镇), Chetou (车头镇)

Townships:

- Zhengang Township (镇岗乡), Fengshan Township (凤山乡), Xinlong Township (新龙乡), Caifang Township (蔡坊乡), Chongshi Township (重石乡), Changsha Township (长沙乡), Fucha Township (浮槎乡), Shuangyuan Township (浮芫乡), Tangcun Township (塘村乡), Gaoyunshan Township (高云山乡)

=== Chongyi County ===
Towns:

- Hengshui (横水镇), Yangmei (扬眉镇), Guobu (过埠镇), Qianchang (铅厂镇), Changlong (长龙镇), Guantian (关田镇)

Townships:

- Longgou Township (龙勾乡), Jieba Township (杰坝乡), Jinkeng Township (金坑乡), Sishun Township (思顺乡), Lintan Township (麟潭乡), Shangbao Township (上堡乡), Niedu Township (聂都乡), Wenying Township (文英乡), Ledong Township (乐洞乡), Fengzhou Township (丰州乡)

=== Dayu County ===
Towns:

- Nan'an (南安镇), Xincheng (新城镇), Zhangdou (樟斗镇), Chijiang (池江镇), Qinglong (青龙镇), Zuoba (左拔镇), Huanglong (黄龙镇), Jicun (吉村镇)

Townships:

- Fujiang Township (浮江乡), Hedong Township (河洞乡), Neiliang Township (内良乡)

=== Dingnan County ===
Towns:

- Lishi (历市镇), Kuimeishan (岿美山镇), Laocheng (老城镇), Tianjiu (天九镇), Longtang (龙塘镇), Lingbei (岭北镇), Egong (鹅公镇)

=== Huichang County ===
Towns:

- Wenwuba (文武坝镇), Junmenling (筠门岭镇), Xijiang (西江镇), Zhoutian (周田镇), Mazhou (麻州镇), Zhuangkou (庄口镇)

Townships:

- Qingxi Township (清溪乡), Youshui Township (右水乡), Gaopai Township (高排乡), Xiaolong Township (晓龙乡), Zhulan Township (珠兰乡), Dongtou Township (洞头乡), Zhongcun Township (中村乡), Zhantang Township (站塘乡), Yonglong Township (永隆乡), Fucheng Township (富城乡), Xiaomi Township (小密乡), Zhuangbu Township (庄埠乡), Bai'e Township (白鹅乡)

=== Ningdu County ===
Towns:

- Meijiang (梅江镇), Qingtang (青塘镇), Changsheng (长胜镇), Huangpi (黄陂镇), Gucun (固村镇), Laicun (赖村镇), Shishang (石上镇), Dongshanba (东山坝镇), Luokou (洛口镇), Xiaobu (小布镇), Huangshi (黄石镇), Tiantou (田头镇)

Townships:

- Zhuze Township (竹笮乡), Duifang Township (对坊乡), Guhou Township (固厚乡), Tianbu Township (田埠乡), Huitong Township (会同乡), Zhantian Township (湛田乡), Anfu Township (安福乡), Dongshao Township (东韶乡), Xiaotian Township (肖田乡), Diaofeng Township (钓峰乡), Dagu Township (大沽乡), Caijiang Township (蔡江乡)

=== Quannan County ===
Towns:

- Chengxiang (城厢镇), Dajishan (大吉山镇), Beitou (陂头镇), Jinlong (金龙镇), Nanjing (南迳镇), Longyuanba (龙源坝镇)

Townships:

- Zhongzhai Township (中寨乡), Shejing Township (社迳乡), Longxia Township (龙下乡)

=== Shangyou County ===
Towns:

- Dongshan (东山镇), Doushui (陡水镇), Shexi (社溪镇), Yingqian (营前镇), Huangbu (黄埠镇)

Townships:

- Meishui Township (梅水乡), Youshi Township (油石乡), Anhe Township (安和乡), Sixia Township (寺下乡), Shuangxi Township (双溪乡), Shuiyan Township (水岩乡), Pingfu Township (平富乡), Wuzhifeng Township (五指峰乡), Ziyang Township (紫阳乡)

=== Shicheng County ===
Towns:

- Qinjiang (琴江镇), Xiaosong (小松镇), Pingshan (屏山镇), Hengjiang (横江镇), Gaotian (高田镇)

Townships:

- Mulan Township (木兰乡), Fengshan Township (丰山乡), Dayou Township (大由乡), Longgang Township (龙岗乡), Zhukeng Township (珠坑乡)

=== Xinfeng County ===
Towns:

- Jiading (嘉定镇), Datangbu (大塘埠镇), Gubei (古陂镇), Daqiao (大桥镇), Xintian (新田镇), Anxi (安西镇), Xiaojiang (小江镇), Tieshikou (铁石口镇), Da'a (大阿镇), Youshan (油山镇), Xiaohe (小河镇), Xiniu (西牛镇), Zhengping (正平镇)

Townships:

- Hushan Township (虎山乡), Chongxian Township (崇仙乡), Wanlong Township (万隆乡)

=== Xingguo County ===
Towns:

- Lianjiang (潋江镇), Jiangbei (江背镇), Gulonggang (古龙冈镇), Meijiao (梅窖镇), Gaoxing (高兴镇), Liangcun (良村镇), Longkou (龙口镇)

Townships:

- Xingjiang Township (兴江乡), Zhangmu Township (樟木乡), Dongcun Township (东村乡), Xinglian Township (兴莲乡), Jiecun Township (杰村乡), Shefu Township (社富乡), Butou Township (埠头乡), Yongfeng Township (永丰乡), Longping Township (隆坪乡), Juncun Township (均村乡), Chayuan Township (茶园乡), Chongxian Township (崇贤乡), Fengbian Township (枫边乡), Nankeng Township (南坑乡), Chenggang Township (城岗乡), Fangtai Township (方太乡), Dinglong Township (鼎龙乡), Changgang Township (长冈乡)

=== Xunwu County ===
Towns:

- Changning (长宁镇), Chenguang (晨光镇), Liuche (留车镇), Nanqiao (南桥镇), Jitan (吉潭镇), Chengjiang (澄江镇), Guizhumao (桂竹帽镇)

Townships:

- Wenfeng Township (文峰乡), Sanbiao Township (三标乡), Changpu Township (菖蒲乡), Longyan Township (龙延乡), Danxi Township (丹溪乡), Dingshan Township (顶山乡), Shuiyuan Township (水源乡), Luoshan Township (罗珊乡)

=== Yudu County ===
Towns:

- Gongjiang (贡江镇), Tieshanlong (铁山垅镇), Pangushan (盘古山镇), Hefeng (禾丰镇), Qilushan (祁禄山镇), Zishan (梓山镇), Yinkeng (银坑镇), Lingbei (岭背镇), Luo'ao (罗坳镇)

Townships:

- Luojiang Township (罗江乡), Xiaoxi Township (小溪乡), Licun Township (利村乡), Xinbei Township (新陂乡), Jingshi Township (靖石乡), Huanglin Township (黄麟乡), Shaxin Township (沙心乡), Kuantian Township (宽田乡), Ge'ao Township (葛坳乡), Qiaotou Township (桥头乡), Ma'an Township (马安乡), Xianxia Township (仙下乡), Chexi Township (车溪乡), Duanwu Township (段屋乡)

== Ji'an ==
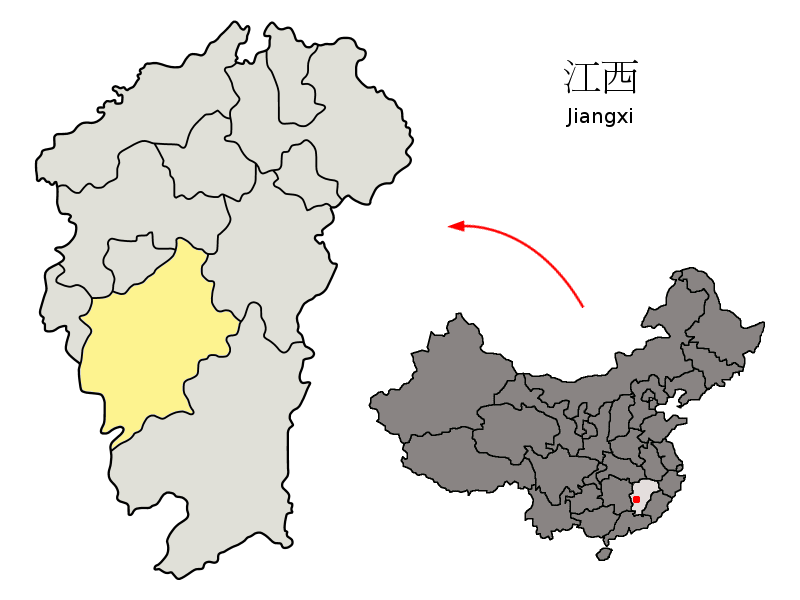
Location of Ji'an in the province

=== Jizhou District ===
Subdistricts:

- Gunan Subdistrict (古南街道), Yongshu Subdistrict (永叔街道), Wenshan Subdistrict (文山街道), Xixiqiao Subdistrict (习溪桥街道), Beimen Subdistrict (北门街道), Baitang Subdistrict (白塘街道)

Towns:

- Xingqiao (兴桥镇), Zhangshan (樟山镇), Changtang (长塘镇), Qulai (曲濑镇)

The only township is Hebu Township (禾埠乡)

=== Qingyuan District ===
Subdistricts:

- Hedong Subdistrict (河东街道), Binjiang Subdistrict (滨江街道)

Towns:

- Tianyu (天玉镇), Zhixia (值夏镇), Xinxu (新圩镇), Futan (富滩镇), Futian (富田镇)

Townships:

- Wenbei Township (文陂乡), Donggu She Ethnic Township (东固畲族乡)

=== Jinggangshan City ===
The only subdistrict is Ciping Subdistrict (茨坪街道)

Towns:

- Xiaping (夏坪镇), Longshi (龙市镇), Gucheng (古城镇), Xincheng (新城镇), Dalong (大陇镇)

Townships:

- Nashan Township (拿山乡), Huang'ao Township (黄垇乡), Xiaqi Township (下七乡), Changping Township (长坪乡), Aoli Township (坳里乡), Eling Township (鹅岭乡), Bailu Township (柏露乡), Maoping Township (茅坪乡), Getian Township (葛田乡), Hehua Township (荷花乡), Mucun Township (睦村乡), Dongshang Township (东上乡)

=== Anfu County ===
Towns:

- Pingdu (平都镇), Hukeng (浒坑镇), Zhouhu (洲湖镇), Henglong (横龙镇), Yangxi (洋溪镇), Yantian (严田镇), Fengtian (枫田镇)

Townships:

- Zhujiang Township (竹江乡), Guashe Township (瓜畲乡), Qianshan Township (钱山乡), Chigu Township (赤谷乡), Shanzhuang Township (山庄乡), Yangmen Township (洋门乡), Jintian Township (金田乡), Pengfang Township (彭坊乡), Taishan Township (泰山乡), Liaotang Township (寮塘乡), Ganluo Township (甘洛乡), Zhangzhuang Township (章庄乡)

=== Ji'an County ===
The only subdistrict is Gaoxin Subdistrict (高新街道)

Towns:

- Dunhou (敦厚镇), Yongyang (永阳镇), Tianhe (天河镇), Hengjiang (横江镇), Gujiang (固江镇), Wanfu (万福镇), Yonghe (永和镇), Tongping (桐坪镇), Fenghuang (凤凰镇), Youtian (油田镇), Aocheng (敖城镇), Meitang (梅塘镇)

Townships:

- Beiyuan Township (北源乡), Dachong Township (大冲乡), Litian Township (浬田乡), Denglong Township (登龙乡), Antang Township (安塘乡), Guantian Township (官田乡), Zhiyang Township (指阳乡)

=== Jishui County ===
Towns:

- Wenfeng (文峰镇), Futian (阜田镇), Pangu (盘谷镇), Fengjiang (枫江镇), Huangqiao (黄桥镇), Jintan (金滩镇), Badu (八都镇), Shuangcun (双村镇), Laoqiao (醪桥镇), Luotian (螺田镇), Baishui (白水镇), Dingjiang (丁江镇), Wujiang (乌江镇), Shuinan (水南镇),

Townships:

- Shangxian Township (尚贤乡), Shuitian Township (水田乡), Guanshan Township (冠山乡)

=== Suichuan County ===
Towns:

- Quanjiang (泉江镇), Yutian (雩田镇), Bizhou (碧洲镇), Caolin (草林镇), Duiziqian (堆子前镇), Zuo'an (左安镇), Gaoping (高坪镇), Dafen (大汾镇), Yaqian (衙前镇), Heyuan (禾源镇), Tanghu (汤湖镇)

Townships:

- Zhutian Township (珠田乡), Jinshi Township (巾石乡), Dakeng Township (大坑乡), Meijiang Township (枚江乡), Shuangqiao Township (双桥乡), Xinjiang Township (新江乡), Wudoujiang Township (五斗江乡), Xixi Township (西溪乡), Nanjiang Township (南江乡), Huangkeng Township (枚江乡), Daijiapu Township (戴家埔乡), Yingpanwei Township (营盘圩乡)

=== Taihe County ===
Towns:

- Chengjiang (澄江镇), Bixi (碧溪镇), Qiaotou (桥头镇), Heshi (禾市镇), Luoxi (螺溪镇), Suxi (苏溪镇), Mashi (马市镇), Tangzhou (塘洲镇), Guanchao (冠朝镇), Shacun (沙村镇), Laoyingpan (老营盘镇), Xiaolong (小龙镇), Guanxi (灌溪镇), Yuanqian (苑前镇), Wanhe (万合镇), Yanxi (沿溪镇)

Townships:

- Shishan Township (石山乡), Nanxi Township (南溪乡), Shangmo Township (上模乡), Shuicha Township (水槎乡), Shangyi Township (上圯乡), Zhonglong Township (中龙乡)

=== Wan'an County ===
Towns:

- Furong (芙蓉镇), Wufeng (五丰镇), Jiantou (枧头镇), Yaotou (窑头镇), Baijia (百嘉镇), Gaobei (高陂镇), Lutian (潞田镇), Shaping (沙坪镇), Xiazao (夏造镇)

Townships:

- Luotang Township (罗塘乡), Tanqian Township (弹前乡), Wushu Township (武术乡), Baoshan Township (宝山乡), Jiantian Township (涧田乡), Shunfeng Township (顺峰乡), Shaokou Township (韶口乡)

=== Xiajiang County ===
Towns:

- Shuibian (水边镇), Mabu (马埠镇), Baqiu (巴邱镇), Renhe (仁和镇), Yanxi (砚溪镇), Luotian (罗田镇)

Townships:

- Tonglin Township (桐林乡), Fumin Township (福民乡), Geping Township (戈坪乡), Jinjiang Township (金江乡), Jinping Ethnic Township (金坪民族乡)

=== Xingan County ===
Towns:

- Jinchuan (金川镇), Sanhu (三湖镇), Dayangzhou (大洋洲镇), Qiqin (七琴镇), Maixie (麦斜镇), Jiebu (界埠镇)

Townships:

- Lijiang Township (溧江乡), Taoxi Township (桃溪乡), Chengshang Township (城上乡), Tanqiu Township (潭丘乡), Shenzhengqiao Township (神政桥乡), Yijiang Township (沂江乡), Hepu Township (荷浦乡)

=== Yongfeng County ===
Towns:

- Enjiang (恩江镇), Kengtian (坑田镇), Yanbei (沿陂镇), Guxian (古县镇), Yaotian (瑶田镇), Tengtian (藤田镇), Shima (石马镇), Shaxi (沙溪镇)

Townships:

- Zuolong Township (佐龙乡), Bajiang Township (八江乡), Tancheng Township (潭城乡), Lugang Township (鹿冈乡), Qidu Township (七都乡), Taotang Township (陶塘乡), Zhongcun Township (中村乡), Shangxi Township (上溪乡), Tantou Township (潭头乡), Sanfang Township (三坊乡), Shanggu Township (上固乡), Junbu Township (君埠乡), Longgang She Ethnic Township (龙冈畲族乡)

=== Yongxin County ===
Towns:

- Hechuan (禾川镇), Shiqiao (石桥镇), Longyuankou (龙源口镇), Litian (浬田镇), Longmen (龙门镇), Shashi (沙市镇), Wenzhu (文竹镇), Buqian (埠前镇), Huaizhong (怀忠镇), Gaoqiaolou (高桥楼镇)

Townships:

- Aonan Township (坳南乡), Qubai Township (曲白乡), Caifeng Township (才丰乡), Yange Township (烟阁乡), Zaizhong Township (在中乡), Sanwan Township (三湾乡), Tailing Township (台岭乡), Longtian Township (龙田乡), Gaoxi Township (高溪乡), Lianzhou Township (莲洲乡), Gaoshi Township (高市乡), Xiangxing Township (象形乡), Luxi Township (芦溪乡)

== Jingdezhen ==
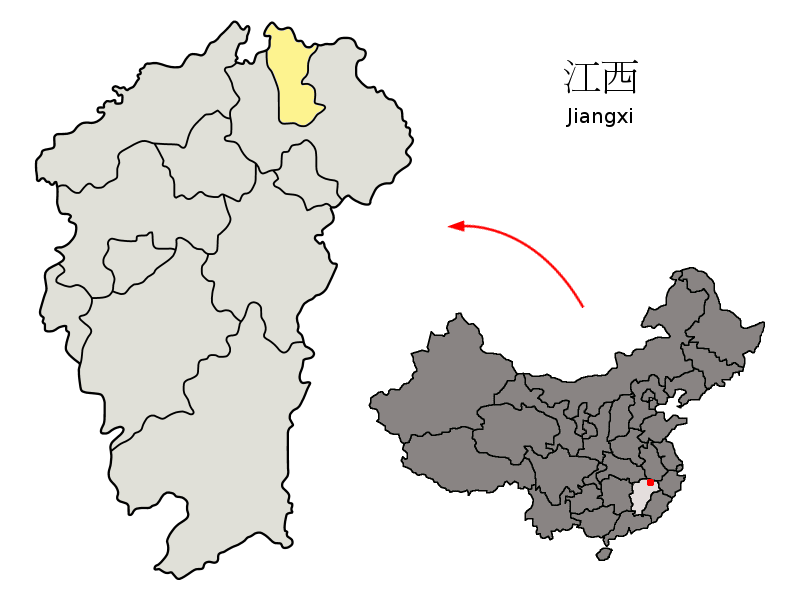
Location of Jingdezhen in the province

=== Changjiang District ===
Subdistricts:

- Xijiao Subdistrict (西郊街道), Xinfeng Subdistrict (新枫街道)

Towns:

- Jingcheng (竟成镇), Nianyushan (鲇鱼山镇)

Townships:

- Liyang Township (丽阳乡), Hetang Township (荷塘乡), Lümeng Township (吕蒙乡)

=== Zhushan District ===
Subdistricts:

- Shishibu Subdistrict (石狮埠街道), Xinchang Subdistrict (新厂街道), Licun Subdistrict (里村街道), Zhoulukou Subdistrict (周路口街道), Changjiang Subdistrict (昌江街道), Xincun Subdistrict (新村街道), Zhushan Subdistrict (珠山街道), Taibaiyuan Subdistrict (太白园街道), Changhe Subdistrict (昌河街道)

=== Leping ===
Subdistricts:

- Jiyang Subdistrict (洎阳街道), Tashan Subdistrict (塔山街道)

Towns:

- Zhenqiao (镇桥镇), Legang (乐港镇), Yongshan (涌山镇), Zhongbu (众埠镇), Andu (按渡镇), Hongyan (洪岩镇), Lilin (礼林镇), Hougang (后港镇), Taqian (塔前镇), Shuangtian (双田镇), Lingang (临港镇), Gaojia (高家镇), Mingkou (名口镇), Wukou (浯口镇)

Townships:

- Luci Township (鸬鹚乡), Shiligang Township (十里岗乡)

=== Fuliang County ===
Towns:

- Fuliang (浮梁镇), Ehu (鹅湖镇), Jinggongqiao (经公桥镇), Jiaotan (蛟潭镇), Xianghu (湘湖镇), Yaoli (瑶里镇), Hongyuan (洪源镇), Shou'an (寿安镇), Sanlong (三龙镇)

Townships:

- Wanggang Township (王港乡), Zhuangwan Township (庄湾乡), Huangtan Township (黄坛乡), Xingtian Township (兴田乡), Jiangcun Township (江村乡), Zhitan Township (峙滩乡), Legong Township (勒功乡), Xihu Township (西湖乡), Luojiaqiao Township (罗家桥乡)

== Jiujiang ==
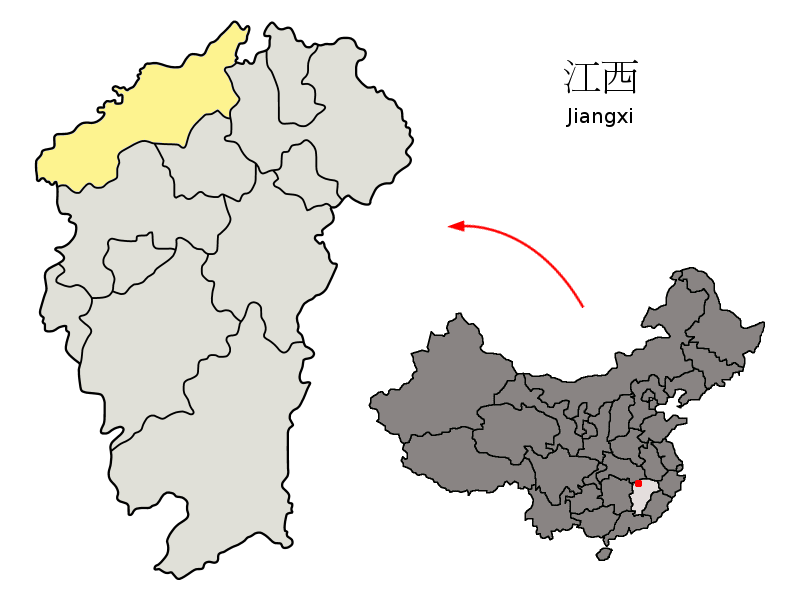
Location of Jiujiang in the province

=== Chaisang District ===
Subdistricts: Shahe Subdistrict (沙河街道), Shizi Subdistrict (狮子街道), Chengmen Subdistrict (城门街道)

Towns:

- Mahuiling (马回岭镇), Jiangzhou (江洲镇), Chengzi (城子镇), Ganggangjie (港口街镇), Xinhe (新合镇)

Townships:

- Yong'an (永安乡), Yongquan (涌泉乡), Xintang (新塘乡), Minshan (岷山乡)

=== Lianxi District ===
Subdistricts:

- Shili Subdistrict (十里街道), Wuli Subdistrict (五里街道), Qilihu Subdistrict (七里湖街道)

Towns:

- Gutang (姑塘镇), Weijia (威家镇), Xingang (新港镇), Lianhua (莲花镇), Haihui (海会镇), Hanyang (寒阳镇), Guling (姑岭镇)

Townships:

- Yujiahe Township (虞家河乡), Gaolong (高垅乡)

=== Xunyang District ===
Subdistricts:

- Gantang Subdistrict (甘棠街道), Penpu Subdistrict (湓浦街道), Renmin Road Subdistrict (人民路街道), Baishuihu Subdistrict (白水湖街道), Jinjipo Subdistrict (金鸡坡街道), Xiangyang Subdistrict (向阳街道), Binxing Subdistrict (滨兴街道)

=== Gongqingcheng City ===
The only subdistrict is Chashan Subdistrict (茶山街道)

Towns:

- Ganlu (甘露镇), Jiangyi (江益镇)

Townships:

- Jinhu Township (金湖乡), Sujiadang Township (苏家垱乡), Zequan Township (泽泉乡)

=== Ruichang City ===
Subdistricts:

- Pencheng Subdistrict (湓城街道), Guilin Subdistrict (桂林街道)

Towns:

- Matou (码头镇), Baiyang (白杨镇), Nanyi (南义镇), Henggang (横港镇), Fan (范镇), Zhaochen (肇陈镇), Gaofeng (高丰镇), Xiafan (夏畈镇)

Townships:

- Leyuan Township (乐园乡), Hongyi Township (洪一乡), Huayuan Township (花园乡), Hongxia Township (洪下乡), Leyuan Township (乐园乡), Wujiao Township (武蛟乡), Henglishan Township (横立山乡), Huangjin Township (黄金乡), Nanyang Township (南阳乡)

=== De'an County ===
Towns:

- Puting (蒲亭镇), Nieqiao (聂桥镇), Cheqiao (车桥镇), Fenglin (丰林镇)

Townships:

- Baota Township (宝塔乡), Hedong Township (河东乡), Gaotang Township (高塘乡), Linquan Township (林泉乡), Wushan Township (吴山乡), Moxi Township (磨溪乡), Aimin Township (爱民乡), Zouqiao Township (邹桥乡), Tangshan Township (塘山乡)

=== Duchang County ===
Towns:

- Duchang (都昌镇), Zhouxi (周溪镇), Sanchagang (三汊港镇), Zhongguan (中馆镇), Dasha (大沙镇), Wanhu (万户镇), Nanfeng (南峰镇), Tutang (土塘镇), Dagang (大港镇), Cailing (蔡岭镇), Xubu (徐埠镇), Zuoli (左里镇)

Townships:

- Hehe Township (和合乡), Yangfeng Township (阳峰乡), Xiyuan Township (西源乡), Xiangxi Township (芗溪乡), Shishan Township (狮山乡), Mingshan Township (鸣山乡), Chunqiao Township (春桥乡), Sushan Township (苏山乡), Duobao Township (多宝乡), Wangdun Township (汪墩乡), Beishan Township (北山乡), Dashu Township (大树乡)

=== Hukou County ===
Towns:

- Shuangzhong (双钟镇), Liusi (流泗镇), Maying (马影镇), Wushan (武山镇), Chengshan (城山镇)

Townships:

- Dalong Township (大垅乡), Huangcun Township (凰村乡), Zhangqing Township (张青乡), Wenqiao Township (文桥乡), Fulong Township (付垅乡), Shunde Township (舜德乡), Liufang Township (流芳乡)

=== Jiujiang County ===
Towns:

- Shahejie (沙河街镇), Mahuiling (马回领镇), Jiangzhou (江洲镇), Chengzi (城子镇), Gangkoujie (港口街镇), Xinhe (新合镇), Shizi (狮子镇)

Townships:

- Yong'an Township (永安乡), Yongquan Township (涌泉乡), Xintang Township (新塘乡), Chengmen Township (城门乡), Minshan Township (岷山乡)

=== Pengze County ===
Towns:

- Longcheng (龙城镇), Mianchuan (棉船镇), Madang (马垱镇), Furongdun (芙蓉墩镇), Dingshan (定山镇), Tianhong (天红镇), Yangzi (杨椊镇), Dongsheng (东升镇), Langxi (浪溪镇), Huanghua (黄花镇)

Townships:

- Taipingguan Township (太平关乡), Huangling Township (黄岭乡), Haoshan Township (浩山乡)

=== Wuning County ===
Towns:

- Xinning (新宁镇), Quankou (泉口镇), Luxi (鲁溪镇), Chuantan (穿滩镇), Lixi (澧溪镇), Luoping (罗坪镇), Shimenlou (石门楼镇), Songxi (宋溪镇)

Townships:

- Dadong Township (大洞乡), Henglu Township (横路乡), Gonglian Township (宫莲乡), Jinkou Township (巾口乡), Donglin Township (东林乡), Shangtang Township (上汤乡), Futian Township (甫田乡), Qingjiang Township (清江乡), Shidu Township (石渡乡), Yangzhou Township (杨洲乡), Luoxi Township (罗溪乡)

=== Lushan City ===
Towns:

- Nankang (南康镇), Bailu (白鹿镇), Wenquan (温泉镇), Liaohua (蓼花镇), Hualin (华林镇), Jiaotang (蛟塘镇), Hengtang (横塘镇)

The only township is Liaonan Township (蓼南乡)

=== Xiushui County ===
Towns:

- Yining (义宁镇), Bailing (白岭镇), Quanfeng (全丰镇), Gushi (古市镇), Daqiao (大桥镇), Zhajin (渣津镇), Ma'ao (马坳镇), Hangkou (杭口镇), Gangkou (港口镇), Xikou (溪口镇), Xigang (西港镇), Shankou (山口镇), Huangsha (黄沙镇), Huanggang (黄港镇), Heshi (何市镇), Shangfeng (上奉镇), Sidu (四都镇), Taiyangsheng (太阳升镇), Ningzhou (宁州镇)

Townships:

- Lukou Township (路口乡), Huanglong Township (黄龙乡), Shangshan Township (上衫乡), Yuduan Township (余锻乡), Shuiyuan Township (水源乡), Shi'ao Township (石坳乡), Donggang Township (东港乡), Shanghang Township (上杭乡), Xinwan Township (新湾乡), Manjiang Township (漫江乡), Buli Township (布里乡), Manjiang Township (漫江乡), Zhuping Township (竹坪乡), Zhengcun Township (征村乡), Miaoling Township (庙岭乡), Huang'ao Township (黄坳乡), Dachun Township (大椿乡)

=== Yongxiu County ===
Towns:

- Tubu (涂埠镇), Wucheng (吴城镇), Sanxiqiao (三溪桥镇), Qiujin (虬津镇), Aicheng (艾城镇), Tanxi (滩溪镇), Baicha (白槎镇), Meitang (梅棠镇), Yanfang (燕坊镇), Makou (马口镇), Zhelin (柘林镇), Jiangyi (江益镇)

Townships:

- Sanjiao Township (三角乡), Jiuhe Township (九合乡), Lixin Township (立新乡), Jiangshang Township (江上乡)

== Pingxiang ==
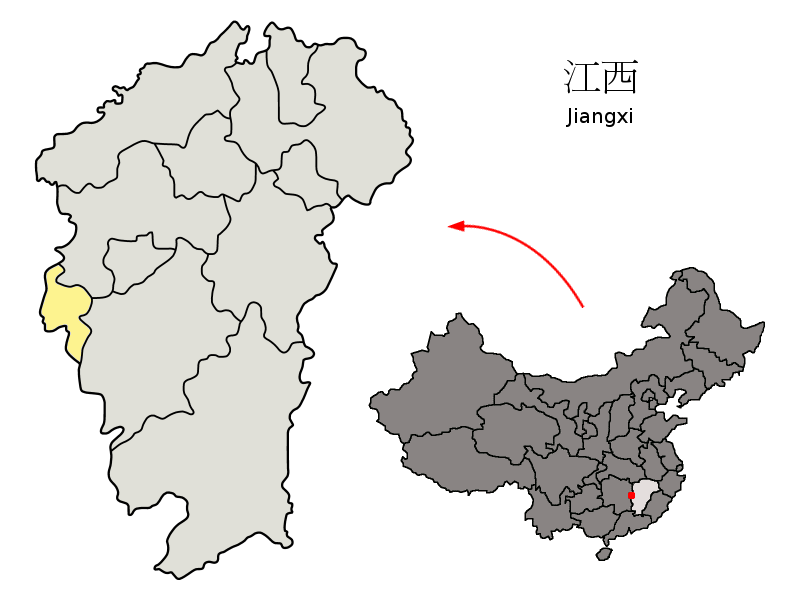
Location of Pingxiang in the province

=== Anyuan District ===
Subdistricts:

- Dongdajie Subdistrict (东大街街道), Fenghuang Avenue Subdistrict (凤凰街街道), Bayi Avenue Subdistrict (八一街街道), Houbu Avenue Subdistrict (后埠街街道), Danjiang Avenue Subdistrict (丹江街街道), Baiyuan Avenue Subdistrict (白源街街道)

Towns:

- Anyuan (安源镇), Gaokeng (高坑镇), Wubei (五陂镇), Qingshan (青山镇)

=== Xiangdong District ===
The only subdistrict is Xiashankou Subdistrict (峡山口街道)

Towns:

- Xiangdong Town (湘东镇), Heyao (荷尧镇), Laoguan (老关镇), Lashi (腊市镇), Xiabu (下埠镇), Paishang (排上镇), Dongqiao (东桥镇), Mashan (麻山镇)

Townships:

- Guanghansai Township (广寒塞乡), Baizhu Township (白竺乡)

=== Lianhua County ===
Towns:

- Qinting (琴亭镇), Lukou (路口镇), Liangfang (良坊镇), Shengfang (升坊镇), Fanglou (坊楼镇)

Townships:

- Shanshi Township (闪石乡), Hushang Township (湖上乡), Sanbanqiao Township (三板桥乡), Shenquan Township (神泉乡), Liushi Township (六市乡), Gaozhou Township (高洲乡), Hetang Township (荷塘乡), Nanling Township (南岭乡)

=== Luxi County ===
Towns:

- Luxi (芦溪镇), Xuanfeng (宣风镇), Shangbu (宣风镇), Nankeng (南坑镇), Yinhe (银河镇)

Townships:

- Yuannan Township (源南乡), Changfeng Township (长丰乡), Zhangjiafang Township (张佳坊乡), Xinquan Township (新泉乡), Wanlongshan Township (万龙山乡)

=== Shangli County ===
Towns:

- Shangli (上栗镇), Tongmu (桐木镇), Jinshan (金山镇), Futian (福田镇), Penggao (彭高镇), Chishan (赤山镇)

Townships:

- Jiguanshan Township (鸡冠山乡), Changping Township (长平乡), Dongyuan Township (东源乡)

== Shangrao ==
=== Xinzhou District ===
Subdistricts:

- Shuinan Subdistrict (水南街道), Dongshi Subdistrict (东市街道), Xishi Subdistrict (西市街道), Beimen Subdistrict (北门街道), Maojialing Subdistrict (茅家岭街道), Lingxi Subdistrict (灵溪街道)

Towns:

- Shaxi (沙溪镇), Chaoyang (朝阳镇), Qinfeng (秦峰镇)

=== Guangxin District ===
Subdistricts:

- Xuri (旭日街道), *Luoqiao (罗桥街道), *Xingyuan (兴园街道),

Towns:

- Tiandun (田墩镇), *Shanglu (上泸镇), *Huatanshan (华坛山镇), *Chating (茶亭镇), *Zaotou (皂头镇), *Sishiba (四十八镇), *Fenglingtou (枫岭头镇), *Huanggu (煌固镇), *Huating (花厅镇), *Wufushan (五府山镇), *Zhengfang (郑坊镇),

Townships:

- Wangxian (望仙乡), *Shiren (石人乡), *Qingshui (清水乡), *Shishi (石狮乡), *Hucun (湖村乡), *Zunqiao (尊桥乡), *Yingjiaxiang (应家乡), *Huangshaling (黄沙岭乡), *Tieshan (铁山乡), *Dongtuan (董团乡)

=== Dexing ===
Subdistricts:

- Yincheng Subdistrict (银城街道), Xinying Subdistrict (新营街道), Xiangtun Subdistrict (香屯街道)

Towns:

- Rao'er (绕二镇), Haikou (海口镇), Xingangshan (新岗山镇), Sizhou (泗洲镇), Huaqiao (花桥镇)

Townships:

- Huangbai Township (黄柏乡), Wancun Township (万村乡), Zhangcun Township (张村乡), Banda Township (昄大乡), Lizhai Township (李宅乡), Longtoushan Township (龙头山乡)

=== Guangfeng County ===
Subdistricts:

- Yongfeng Subdistrict (永丰街道), Lulin Subdistrict (芦林街道), Fengxi Subdistrict, Shangrao (丰溪街道)

Towns:

- Wudu (五都镇), Yangkou (洋口镇), Hengshan (横山镇), Tongfan (桐畈镇), Hufeng (湖丰镇), Danan (大南镇), Paishan (排山镇), Maocun (毛村镇), Jiandi (枧底镇), Quanbo (泉波镇), Huqiao (壶桥镇), Xiafeng (霞峰镇), Xiaxi (下溪镇), Wucun (吴村镇), Shatian (沙田镇), Tongboshan (铜钹山镇)

Townships:

- Dashi Township (大石乡), Dongyang Township (东阳乡), Songfeng Township (嵩峰乡), Shaoyang Township (少阳乡)

=== Hengfeng County ===
The only subdistrict is Xing'an Subdistrict (兴安街道)

Towns:

- Cenyang (岑阳镇), Geyuan (葛源镇)

Townships:

- Yaojia Township (姚家乡), Lianhe Township (莲荷乡), Sipu Township (司铺乡), Gangbian Township (港边乡), Longmenfan Township (龙门畈乡), Qingban Township (青板乡)

=== Poyang County ===
Towns:

- Poyang (鄱阳镇), Xiejiatian (谢家滩镇), Shimenjie (石门街镇), Sishilijie (四十里街镇), Youdunjie (油墩街镇), Tianfanjie (田畈街镇), Jinpanling (金盘岭镇), Gaojialing (高家岭镇), Huanggang (凰岗镇), Shuanggang (双港镇), Guxiandu (古县渡镇), Raofeng (饶丰镇), Lefeng (乐丰镇), Raobu (饶埠镇)

Townships:

- Houjiagang Township (侯家岗乡), Lianhuashan Township (莲花山乡), Xiangshuitan Township (响水滩乡), Jiantianjie Township (枧田街乡), Zhegang Township (柘港乡), Yaquehu Township (鸦鹊湖乡), Yinbaohu Township (银宝湖乡), Youcheng Township (游城乡), Zhuhu Township (珠湖乡), Baishazhou Township (白沙洲乡), Tuanlin Township (团林乡), Changzhou Township (昌洲乡), Miaoqian Township (庙前乡), Lianhu Township (莲湖乡), Lutian Township (芦田乡)

=== Shangrao County ===
Subdistricts:

- Xuri Subdistrict (旭日街道), Luoqiao Subdistrict (罗桥街道), Xingyuan Subdistrict (兴园街道)

Towns:

- Tiandun (田墩镇), Shanglu (上泸镇), Huatanshan (华坛山镇), Chating (茶亭镇), Zaotou (皂头镇), Sishiba (四十八镇), Fenglingtou (枫岭头镇), Huanggu (煌固镇), Huating (花厅镇), Wufushan (五府山镇), Zhengfang (郑坊镇)

Townships:

- Wangxian Township (望仙乡), Shiren Township (石人乡), Qingshui Township (清水乡), Shishi Township (石狮乡), Hucun Township (湖村乡), Zunqiao Township (尊桥乡), Yingjia Township (应家乡), Huangshaling Township (黄沙岭乡), Tieshan Township (铁山乡), Dongtuan Township (董团乡)

=== Wannian County ===
Towns:

- Chenying (陈营镇), Shizhen (石镇镇), Qingyun (青云镇), Zibu (梓埠镇), Dayuan (大源镇), Peimei (裴梅镇)

Townships:

- Huyun Township (湖云乡), Qibu Township (齐埠乡), Wangjia Township (汪家乡), Shangfang Township (上坊乡), Suqiao Township (苏桥乡), Zhutian Township (珠田乡)

=== Wuyuan County ===
The only subdistrict is Rancheng Subdistrict (蚺城街道)

Towns:

- Ziyang (紫阳镇), Qinghua (清华镇), Qiukou (秋口镇), Jiangwan (江湾镇), Sikou (思口镇), Fuchun (赋春镇), Zhentou (镇头镇), Taibai (太白镇), Zhongyun (中云镇), Xucun (许村镇)

Townships:

- Xitou Township (溪头乡), Duanxin Township (段莘乡), Zheyuan Township (浙源乡), Tuochuan Township (沱川乡), Dazhangshan Township (大鄣山乡), Zhenzhushan Township (珍珠山乡)

=== Yanshan County ===
Towns:

- Hekou (河口镇), Yongping (永平镇), Shitang (石塘镇), Ehu (鹅湖镇), Hufang (湖坊镇), Wuyishan (武夷山镇), Wang'er (汪二镇)

Townships:

- Chenfang Township (陈坊乡), Hongqiao Township (虹桥乡), Xintan Township (新滩乡), Gexianshan Township (葛仙山乡), Jiaxuan Township (稼轩乡), Yingjiang Township (英将乡), Zixi Township (紫溪乡), Tianzhushan Township (天柱山乡), Taiyuan She Ethnic Township (太源畲族乡) Huangbi She Ethnic Township (篁碧畲族乡)

=== Yiyang County ===
The only subdistrict is Taoyuan Subdistrict (桃源街道)

Towns:

- Caoxi (曹溪镇), Qigong (漆工镇), Zhangshudun (樟树墩镇), Nanyan (南岩镇), Zhukeng (朱坑镇), Guifeng (圭峰镇), Dieshan (叠山镇), Gangkou (港口镇), Yijiang (弋江镇)

Townships:

- Zhongfan Township (中畈乡), Gexi Township (葛溪乡), Wanli Township (湾里乡), Qinghu Township (清湖乡), Xuguang Township (旭光乡)

=== Yugan County ===
Towns:

- Yuting (玉亭镇), Ruihong (瑞洪镇), Huangjinbu (黄金埠镇), Gubu (古埠镇), Wuni (乌泥镇), Shikou (石口镇), Yangbu (杨埠镇), Jiulong (九龙镇)

Townships:

- Kangshan Township (康山乡), Dongtang Township (东塘乡), Datang Township (大塘乡), Lusigang Township (鹭鸶港乡), Santang Township (三塘乡), Hongjiazui Township (洪家嘴乡), Baimaqiao Township (白马桥乡), Jiangbu Township (江埠乡), Fenggang Township (枫港乡), Daxi Township (大溪乡), Meigang Township (梅港乡), Shegeng Township (社赓乡)

=== Yushan County ===
The only subdistrict is Fenglin Subdistrict (枫林街道)

Towns:

- Bingxi (冰溪镇), Linhu (临湖镇), Bimu (必姆镇), Hengjie (横街镇), Wencheng (文成镇), Xiazhen (下镇镇), Yanrui (岩瑞镇), Shuangming (双明镇), Zihu (紫湖镇), Xianyan (仙岩镇), Zhangcun (樟村镇)

Townships:

- Nanshan Township (南山乡), Huaiyu Township (怀玉乡), Xiatang Township (下塘乡), Siguqiao Township (四股桥乡), Liudu Township (六都乡), Sanqing Township (三清乡)

== Xinyu ==
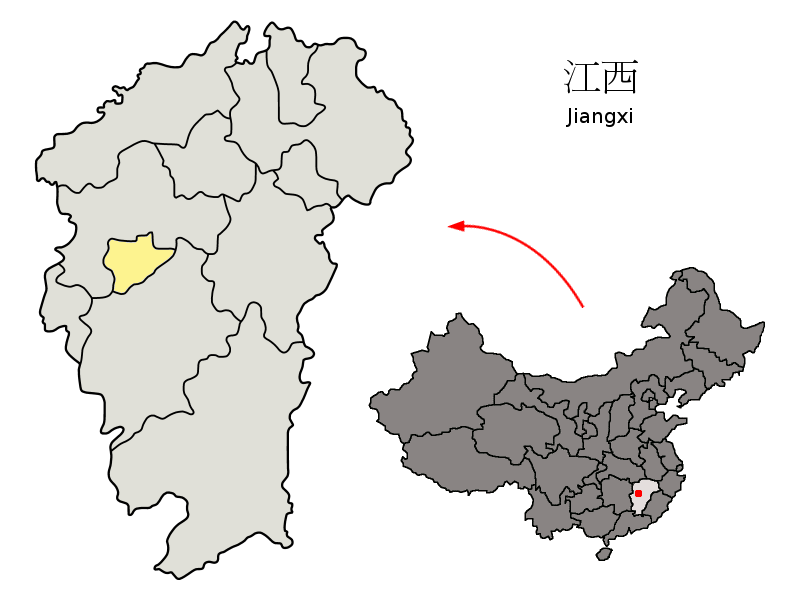
Location of Xinyu in the province

=== Yushui District ===
Subdistricts:

- Chengnan Subdistrict (城南街道), Chengbei Subdistrict (城北街道), Yuanhe Subdistrict (袁河街道), Xianlai Subdistrict (仙来街道), Tongzhou Subdistrict (通州街道)

Towns:

- Luofang (罗坊镇), Shuibei (水北镇), Liangshan (良山镇), Shuixi (水西镇), Yaoxu (姚圩镇), Xiacun (下村镇), Zhushan (珠珊镇), Hexia (河下镇), Ouli (欧里镇), Guanchao (观巢镇)

Townships:

- Nan'an Township (南安乡), Jieshui Township (界水乡), Renhe Township (人和乡), Jiulongshan Township (九龙山乡), Hushan Township (鹄山乡), Xinxi Township (新溪乡)

=== Fenyi County ===
Towns:

- Fenyi (分宜镇), Yangqiao (杨桥镇), Huze (湖泽镇), Shuanglin (双林镇), Qianshan (钤山镇), Yangjiang (洋江镇)

Townships:

- Fengyang Township (凤阳乡), Dongcun Township (洞村乡), Gaolan Township (高岚乡), Caochang Township (操场乡)

== Yichun ==
=== Yuanzhou District ===
Subdistricts:

- Lingquan Subdistrict (灵泉街道), Xiujiang Subdistrict (秀江街道), Zhanlang Subdistrict (湛郎街道), Zhuquan Subdistrict (珠泉街道), Huacheng Subdistrict (化成街道), Guanyuan Subdistrict (官园街道), Xiapu Subdistrict (下浦街道), Fenghuang Subdistrict (凤凰街道), Jinyuan Subdistrict (金园街道)

Towns:

- Binjiang (彬江镇), Xicun (西村镇), Jinrui (金瑞镇), Wentang (温汤镇), Sanyang (三阳镇), Cihua (慈化镇), Tiantai (天台镇), Hongtang (洪塘镇), Wojiang (渥江镇), Xinfang (新坊镇), Zhaixia (寨下镇), Lucun (芦村镇), Hutian (湖田镇), Shuijiang Town (水江镇), Xintian (新田镇), Nanmiao (南庙镇), Zhuting (竹亭镇)

Townships:

- Hongjiang Township (洪江乡), Nanmu Township (楠木乡), Liaoshi Township (辽市乡), Baimu Township (柏木乡), Feijiantan Township (飞剑潭乡)

=== Fengcheng ===
Subdistricts:

- Jianguang Subdistrict (剑光街道), Hezhou Subdistrict (河洲街道), Jiannan Subdistrict (剑南街道), Sundu Subdistrict (孙渡街道), Shangzhuang Subdistrict (尚庄街道)

Towns:

- Baitu (白土镇), Yuandu (袁渡镇), Zhangxiang (张巷镇), Dushi (杜市镇), Taosha (淘沙镇), Xiushi (秀市镇), Luoshi (洛市镇), Tielu (铁路镇), Licun (丽村镇), Dongjia (董家镇), Huangcheng (隍城镇), Xiaogang (小港镇), Shitan (石滩镇), Qiaodong (桥东镇), Rongtang (荣塘镇), Tuochuan (拖船镇), Quangang (泉港镇), Meilin (梅林镇), Qujiang (曲江镇), Shangtang (上塘镇)

Townships:

- Xiaotang Township (筱塘乡), Duantan Township (段潭乡), Jiaokeng Township (蕉坑乡), Shijiang Township (石江乡), Hehu Township (荷湖乡), Hutang Township (湖塘乡), Tongtian Township (同田乡)

=== Gao'an ===
Subdistricts:

- Ruizhou Subdistrict (瑞州街道), Junyang Subdistrict (筠阳街道)

Towns:

- Lanfang (蓝坊镇), Heling (荷岭镇), Huangshagang (黄沙岗镇), Xinjie (新街镇), Bajing (八景镇), Ducheng (独城镇), Taiyang (太阳镇), Jianshan (建山镇), Tiannan (田南镇), Xiangcheng (相城镇), Huibu (灰埠镇), Shinao (石脑镇), Longtan (龙潭镇), Yangxu (杨圩镇), Cunqian (村前镇), Wuqiao (伍桥镇), Xiangfu (祥符镇), Dacheng (大城镇)

Townships:

- Shanghu Township (上湖乡), Wangjiaxu Township (汪家圩乡)

=== Zhangshu ===
Subdistricts:

- Ganyang Subdistrict (淦阳街道), Lujiang Subdistrict (鹿江街道), Fucheng Subdistrict (福城街道), Daqiao Subdistrict (大桥街道), Zhangjiashan Subdistrict (张家山街道)

Towns:

- Linjiang (临江镇), Yongtai (永泰镇), Huangtugang (黄土岗镇), Jinglou (经楼镇), Changfu (昌付镇), Dianxia (店下镇), Geshan (阁山镇), Liugongmiao (刘公庙镇), Guanshang (观上镇), Yicheng (义成镇)

Townships:

- Zhongzhou Township (中洲乡), Zhoushang Township (洲上乡), Yanghu Township (洋湖乡), Wucheng Township (吴城乡)

=== Fengxin County ===
Towns:

- Fengchuan (冯川镇), Chi'an (赤岸镇), Chitian (赤田镇), Songbu (宋埠镇), Ganzhou (干洲镇), Zaoxia (澡下镇), Huibu (会埠镇), Luoshi (罗市镇), Shangfu (上富镇), Ganfang (甘坊镇)

Townships:

- Yangshan Township (仰山乡), Zaoxi Township (澡溪乡), Liuxi Township (柳溪乡)

=== Jing'an County ===
Towns:

- Shuangxi (双溪镇), Renshou (仁首镇), Baofeng (宝峰镇), Gaohu (高湖镇), Zaodu (躁都镇)

Townships:

- Xiangtian Township (香田乡), Shuikou Township (水口乡), Zhongyuan Township (中源乡), Luowan Township (罗湾乡), Sanzhualun Township (三爪仑乡), Leigongjian Township (雷公尖乡)

=== Shanggao County ===
The only subdistrict is Aoyang Subdistrict (敖阳街道)

Towns:

- Tianxin (田心镇), Xujiadu (徐家渡镇), Jinjiang (锦江镇), Sixi (泗溪镇), Hantang (翰堂镇), Nangang (南港镇), Aoshan (敖山镇)

Townships:

- Luzhou Township (芦洲乡), Taxia Township (塔下乡), Mengshan Township (蒙山乡), Zhendu Township (镇渡乡), Yeshi Township (野市乡), Xinjiebu Township (新界埠乡)

=== Tonggu County ===
Towns:

- Yongning (永宁镇), Wenquan (温泉镇), Qiping (棋坪镇), Paibu (排埠镇), Sandu (三都镇), Daduan (大段镇)

Townships:

- Gaoqiao Township (高桥乡), Gangkou Township (港口乡), Daixi Township (带溪乡)

=== Wanzai County ===
The only subdistrict is Kangle Subdistrict (康乐街道)

Towns:

- Zhutan (株潭镇), Huangmao (黄茅镇), Tanbu (潭埠镇), Shuangqiao (双桥镇), Gaocun (高村镇), Luocheng (罗城镇), Sanxing (三兴镇), Gaocheng (高城镇), Bailiang (白良镇)

Townships:

- Efeng Township (鹅峰乡), Mabu Township (马埠乡), Chixing Township (赤兴乡), Lingdong Township (岭东乡), Baishui Township (白水乡), Xianyuan Township (仙源乡), Jiaohu Township (茭湖乡)

=== Yifeng County ===
Towns:

- Xinchang (新昌镇), Chengtang (澄塘镇), Tangpu (棠浦镇), Xinzhuang (新庄镇), Tanshan (潭山镇), Fangxi (芳溪镇), Shishi (石市镇)

Townships:

- Huaqiao Township (花桥乡), Tong'an Township (同安乡), Tianbao Township (天宝乡), Huanggang Township (黄岗乡), Qiaoxi Township (桥西乡)

== Yingtan ==
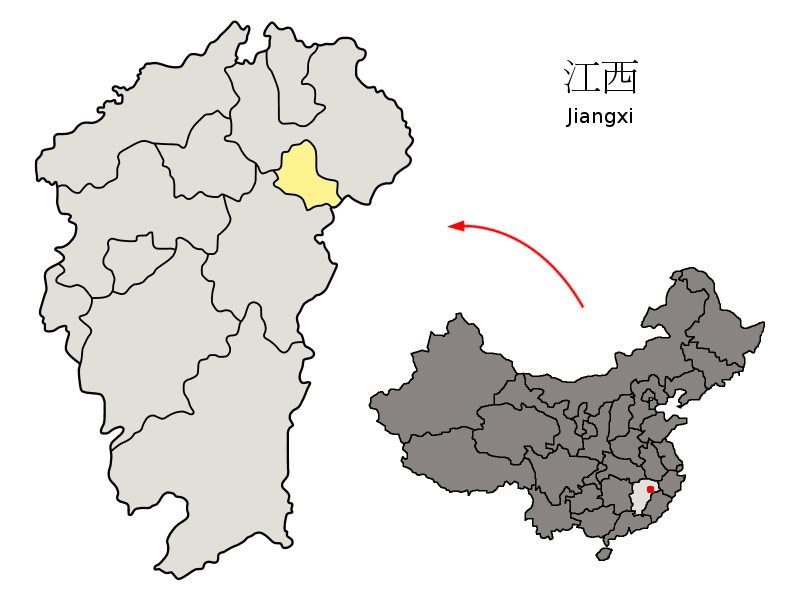
Location of Yingtan in the province

=== Yuehu District ===
Subdistricts:

- Jiangbian Subdistrict (江边街道), Jiaotong Subdistrict (交通街道), Donghu Subdistrict (东湖街道), Meiyuan Subdistrict (梅园街道), Siqing Subdistrict (四青街道), Bailu Subdistrict (白露街道)

The only town is Tongjia (童家镇), and the only township is Xiabu Township (夏埠乡)

=== Guixi ===
Subdistricts:

- Huayuan Subdistrict (花园街道), Xiongshi Subdistrict (雄石街道), Dongmen Subdistrict (东门街道)

Towns:

- Sili (泗沥镇), Hetan (河潭镇), Zhoufang (周坊镇), Hongtang (鸿塘镇), Zhiguang (同光镇), Liukou (流口镇), Luohe (罗河镇), Jintun (金屯镇), Tangwan (塘湾镇), Wenfang (文坊镇), Lengshui (冷水镇), Longhushan (龙虎山镇), Shangqing (上清镇)

Townships:

- Binjiang Township (滨江乡), Baitian Township (白田乡), Leixi Township (雷溪乡), Pengwan Township (彭湾乡), Zhangping She Ethnic Township (漳坪畲族乡), Erkou Township (耳口乡), Yujia Township (余家乡)

=== Yujiang County ===
Towns:

- Dengbu (邓埠镇), Jinjiang (锦江镇), Huangxi (潢溪镇), Zhongtong (中童镇), Maquan (马荃镇), Huaqiao (画桥镇)

Townships:

- Pingding Township (平定乡), Chuntao Township (春涛乡), Yangxi Township (杨溪乡), Honghu Township (洪湖乡), Huangzhuang Township (黄庄乡)
