= Tieshan =

Tieshan may refer to:

- Iron shirt or tieshan, a form of hard-style Chinese martial art
- Tsuga chinensis, known as tieshan in Chinese, a coniferous tree species native to China, Taiwan, and Vietnam
- Princess Iron Fan or Princess Tieshan, a fictional character from the Chinese novel Journey to the West

== Locations in China ==
- Tieshan District, Huangshi, Hubei

=== Towns ===
- Tieshan, Chongqing
- Tieshan, Zhenghe County, Fujian

=== Townships ===
- Tieshan Township, Heilongjiang, in Qitaihe, Heilongjiang
- Tieshan Township, Hunan, in Hongjiang, Hunan
- Tieshan Township, Jiangxi, in Shangrao, Jiangxi

=== Subdistricts ===
- Tieshan Subdistrict, Dalian, Liaoning
- Tieshan Subdistrict, Longyan, Fujian
- Tieshan Subdistrict, Qingdao, Shandong
- Tieshan Subdistrict, Wugang, Henan

== See also ==
- Cholsan County, North P'yŏngan province, North Korea
