= Shixia =

Shixia may refer to:

- Shixia culture, a Neolithic culture after an archaeological site in Maba, Qujiang District, Shaoguan, Guangdong, China

== Places in China ==
- Shixia, Gansu (石峡镇), a town in Xihe County, Gansu
- Shixia Township, Jiangxi (石峡乡), a township in Zixi County, Jiangxi
- Shixia Township, Shanxi (石匣乡), a township in Zuoquan County, Shanxi

== See also ==
- Shixia Station (石厦站), a metro station in Shenzhen, Guangdong
