= Zhanggong =

Zhanggong may refer to these places in China:

- Zhanggong District (章贡区), a district of Ganzhou, Jiangxi

== Towns ==
- Zhanggong, Henan (张弓), in Ningling County, Henan
- Zhanggong, Jinxian County (张公), in Jinxian County, Jiangxi
- Zhanggong, Sichuan (张公), in Yilong County, Sichuan

== See also ==
- Zhang Gong (born 1992), Chinese footballer
