= Wanli District =

Wanli District may refer to:

- Wanli District, Nanchang, district of Nanchang, Jiangxi, China
- Wanli District, New Taipei, a district in New Taipei, Taiwan
