= Xinzhou (disambiguation) =

Xinzhou (忻州市) is a prefecture-level city in northern Shanxi, China.

Xinzhou may also refer to other locations in China:

- Xinzhou District, Shangrao (信州区; 信州區), Jiangxi
- Xinzhou District, Wuhan (新洲区; 新洲區), Hubei
- Xinzhou, Jinshi (新洲镇), a town in Jinshi City, Hunan Province.
- An historical name (信州) for Yunnanyi, Yunnan
