= Luzhou (disambiguation) =

Luzhou (泸州) is a prefecture-level city in Sichuan, China.

Luzhou can also refer to:

== China ==
- Luzhou, Guangdong (芦洲镇), a town in Huicheng District, Huizhou, Guangdong
- Luzhou District, Changzhi (潞州区), Shanxi
- Luzhou Township (芦洲乡), a township in Shanggao County, Jiangxi
- Lu Prefecture (Anhui) (廬州), a prefecture between the 6th and 13th centuries in modern Anhui

== Taiwan ==
- Luzhou District, New Taipei (蘆洲區)
- Luzhou line, a metro branch line of the Zhonghe-Xinlu Line, Taipei Metro
  - Luzhou metro station

== See also ==
- Lu (disambiguation)
- 陸州 (disambiguation)
