= 信州 =

信州 may refer to:

- An historical name (信州) for Yunnanyi, Yunnan
- Xinzhou District, Shangrao (信州区), Jiangxi
- Shinano Province, abbreviated name was Shinshū (信州), province of Japan located in what is today Nagano Prefecture
