= Xiangyang Subdistrict, Jiujiang =

Xiangyang Subdistrict 向阳街道
- Subdistrict
- Location in Jiangxi Xiangyang Subdistrict (China)
- Coordinates: 29.6727°N 115.9687°E
- Country: People's Republic of China
- Province: Jiangxi
- Prefecture-level city: Jiujiang
- District: Xunyang District
- Time zone: UTC+8 (China Standard)

Xiangyang Subdistrict (Chinese: 向阳街道; pinyin: Xiàngyáng Jiēdào) is a subdistrict of the Xunyang District, in the Jiujiang city, Jiangxi, China, located in Jiujiang Economic and Technological Development Zone. As of 2018, it has 8 residential communities and 7 villages under its administration.

== See also ==
- List of township-level divisions of Jiangxi
