= Luzhou station (disambiguation) =

Luzhou station may refer to:

- Luzhou metro station, a metro station in New Taipei, Taiwan
- Luzhou railway station, a railway station in Luzhou, Sichuan, China

== See also ==
- Luzhou (disambiguation)
