= Chongxian Township, Xingguo County =

Chongxian Township 崇贤乡
- Township
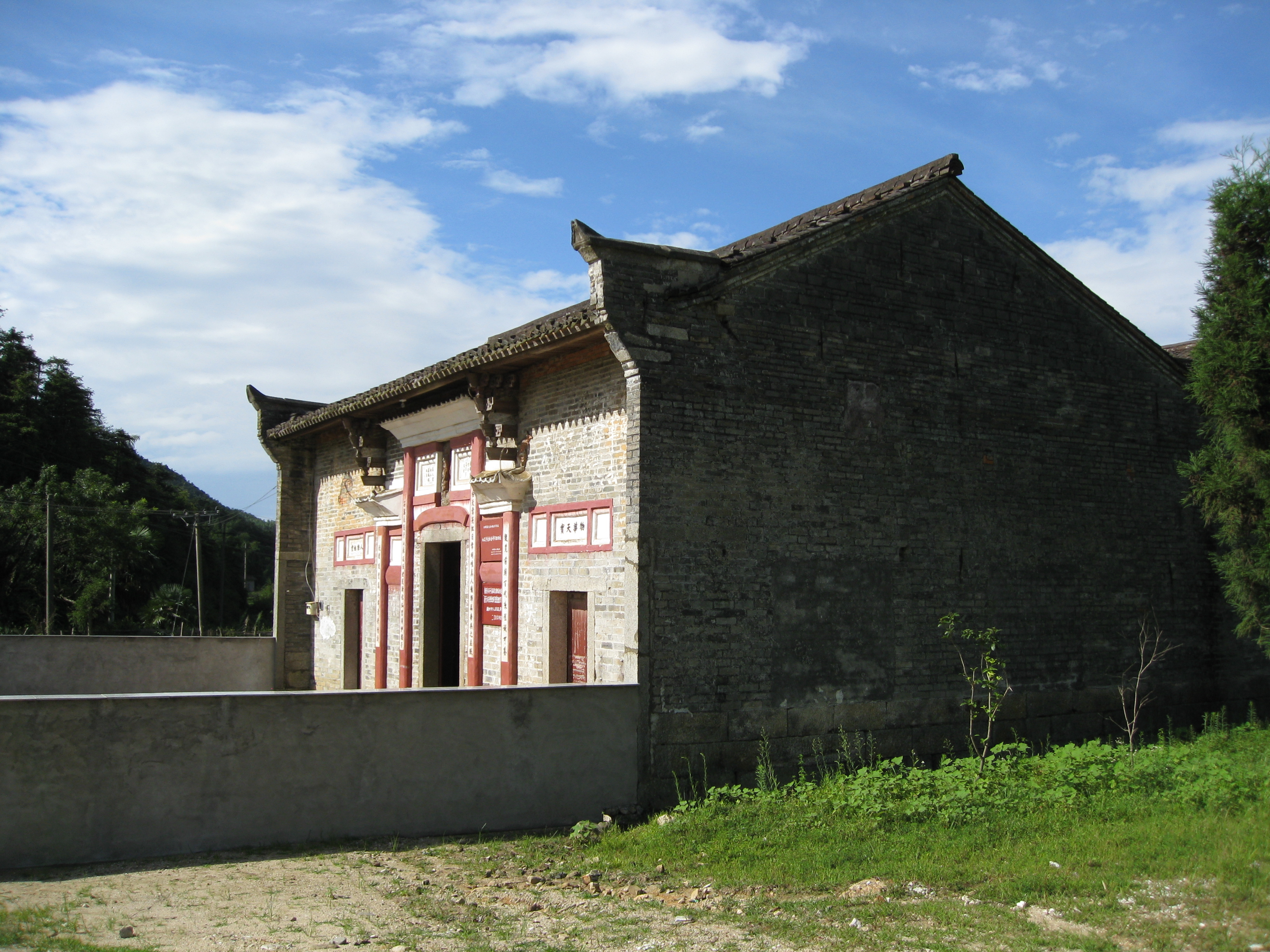

- Location in Jiangxi Chongxian Township (China)
- Coordinates: 26°32′43″N 115°20′44″E
- Country: People's Republic of China
- Province: Jiangxi
- Prefecture-level city: Ganzhou
- County: Xingguo County
- Time zone: UTC+8 (China Standard)

Chongxian Township (simplified Chinese: 崇贤乡; traditional Chinese: 崇賢鄉; pinyin: Chóngxián Xiāng) is a township in Xingguo County, Jiangxi, China. As of 2020, it administers the following twelve villages:

- Chongxian Village
- Chongyi Village (崇义村)
- Dongfeng Village (东风村)
- Longtan She Ethnic Village (龙潭畲族村)
- Shangmian Village (上沔村)
- Xiaguang Village (霞光村)
- Taiping Village (太平村)
- Sanjiao Village (三角村)
- Hetang Village (贺堂村)
- Dalong Village (大龙村)
- Beisheng Village (北胜村)
- Qifen Village (齐分村)

== See also ==
- List of township-level divisions of Jiangxi
