= Xuri Subdistrict =

Xuri Subdistrict 旭日街道
- Subdistrict
- Location in Jiangxi Xuri Subdistrict (China)
- Coordinates: 28°28′00″N 117°58′00″E
- Country: People's Republic of China
- Province: Jiangxi
- Prefecture-level city: Shangrao
- County: Shangrao County
- Time zone: UTC+8 (China Standard)

Xuri Subdistrict (Chinese: 旭日街道; pinyin: Xùrì Jiēdào) is a subdistrict in Shangrao County, Jiangxi, China. As of 2018, it has 21 residential communities under its administration.

== See also ==
- List of township-level divisions of Jiangxi
