= Shejing Township =

Shejing Township 社迳乡
- Township
- Location in Jiangxi Shejing Township (China)
- Coordinates: 25°4′50″N 114°40′55″E
- Country: People's Republic of China
- Province: Jiangxi
- Prefecture-level city: Ganzhou
- County: Quannan County
- Village-level divisions: 7 villages
- Time zone: UTC+8 (China Standard)

Shejing Township (simplified Chinese: 社迳乡; traditional Chinese: 社迳鄉; pinyin: Shèjìng Xiāng) is a township of Quannan County in southwestern Jiangxi province, China. As of 2023, it administers Shejing Village, Lujing Village (炉迳村), Laowu Village (老屋村), Taxia Village (塔下村), Dangjing Village (当迳村), Jiangkou Village (江口村), and Shuidong Village (水东村).

== See also ==
- List of township-level divisions of Jiangxi
