= Tonggu County =

Tonggu County 铜鼓县 Tungku
- County
- Location in Jiangxi
- Coordinates: 28°31′16″N 114°22′16″E
- Country: People's Republic of China
- Province: Jiangxi
- Prefecture-level city: Yichun

Area
  - Total: 1,547.7 km^{2} (597.6 sq mi)

Population (2018)
  - Total: 138,616
  - Density: 89.563/km^{2} (231.97/sq mi)
- Time zone: UTC+8 (China Standard)
- Postal Code: 336200

Tonggu County (simplified Chinese: 铜鼓县; traditional Chinese: 銅鼓縣; pinyin: Tónggǔ Xiàn) is a county of Jiangxi province, People's Republic of China, bordering Hunan province to the west. It is under the jurisdiction of the prefecture-level city of Yichun.

== Administrative divisions ==
In the present, Tonggu County has 6 towns and 3 townships.

6 towns

- Yongning (永宁镇)
- Wenquan (温泉镇)
- Qiping (棋坪镇)
- Paibu (排埠镇)
- Sandu (三都镇)
- Daduan (大段镇)

3 townships

- Gaoqiao (高桥乡)
- Gangkou (港口乡)
- Daixi (带溪乡)

== Demographics ==
The population of the district was 135,924 in 1999. 70% of the population are Hakka-speakers.

== Climate ==
Climate data for Tonggu, elevation 260 m (850 ft), (1991–2020 normals, extremes 1981–2010)
Month	Jan	Feb	Mar	Apr	May	Jun	Jul	Aug	Sep	Oct	Nov	Dec	Year
Record high °C (°F)	24.4 (75.9)	28.5 (83.3)	33.2 (91.8)	34.0 (93.2)	35.3 (95.5)	37.1 (98.8)	39.4 (102.9)	40.1 (104.2)	37.4 (99.3)	34.5 (94.1)	30.9 (87.6)	25.4 (77.7)	40.1 (104.2)
Mean daily maximum °C (°F)	9.9 (49.8)	12.7 (54.9)	16.6 (61.9)	23.0 (73.4)	27.2 (81.0)	29.8 (85.6)	32.8 (91.0)	32.6 (90.7)	29.3 (84.7)	24.4 (75.9)	18.7 (65.7)	12.9 (55.2)	22.5 (72.5)
Daily mean °C (°F)	5.1 (41.2)	7.6 (45.7)	11.3 (52.3)	17.1 (62.8)	21.5 (70.7)	24.7 (76.5)	27.4 (81.3)	26.6 (79.9)	23.3 (73.9)	17.9 (64.2)	12.2 (54.0)	6.9 (44.4)	16.8 (62.2)
Mean daily minimum °C (°F)	2.2 (36.0)	4.3 (39.7)	7.8 (46.0)	13.1 (55.6)	17.7 (63.9)	21.4 (70.5)	23.5 (74.3)	23.1 (73.6)	19.5 (67.1)	13.9 (57.0)	8.3 (46.9)	3.2 (37.8)	13.2 (55.7)
Record low °C (°F)	−7.0 (19.4)	−5.6 (21.9)	−4.9 (23.2)	−0.9 (30.4)	7.3 (45.1)	12.1 (53.8)	15.6 (60.1)	16.3 (61.3)	10.6 (51.1)	0.0 (32.0)	−4.1 (24.6)	−10.4 (13.3)	−10.4 (13.3)
Average precipitation mm (inches)	83.3 (3.28)	98.6 (3.88)	176.3 (6.94)	216.1 (8.51)	261.3 (10.29)	350.3 (13.79)	217.9 (8.58)	169.5 (6.67)	96.5 (3.80)	64.1 (2.52)	90.3 (3.56)	58.9 (2.32)	1,883.1 (74.14)
Average precipitation days (≥ 0.1 mm)	14.7	14.6	19.2	18.4	18.1	18.5	14.5	15.0	11.1	10.5	11.6	11.7	177.9
Average snowy days	3.5	2.1	0.5	0	0	0	0	0	0	0	0.1	1.3	7.5
Average relative humidity (%)	84	84	85	83	83	85	82	83	83	82	83	82	83
Mean monthly sunshine hours	68.2	69.0	75.8	100.8	117.1	108.9	181.2	166.7	139.7	128.1	109.9	103.6	1,369
Percentage possible sunshine	21	22	20	26	28	26	43	41	38	36	34	32	31
Source: China Meteorological Administration
