= Wugang, Henan =

Wugang 舞钢市
- County-level city
- Location in Henan
- Coordinates: 33°17′42″N 113°31′37″E
- Country: People's Republic of China
- Province: Henan
- Prefecture-level city: Pingdingshan

Area
  - Total: 640 km^{2} (250 sq mi)

Population (2019)
  - Total: 321,800
  - Density: 500/km^{2} (1,300/sq mi)
- Time zone: UTC+8 (China Standard)
- Postal code: 462500

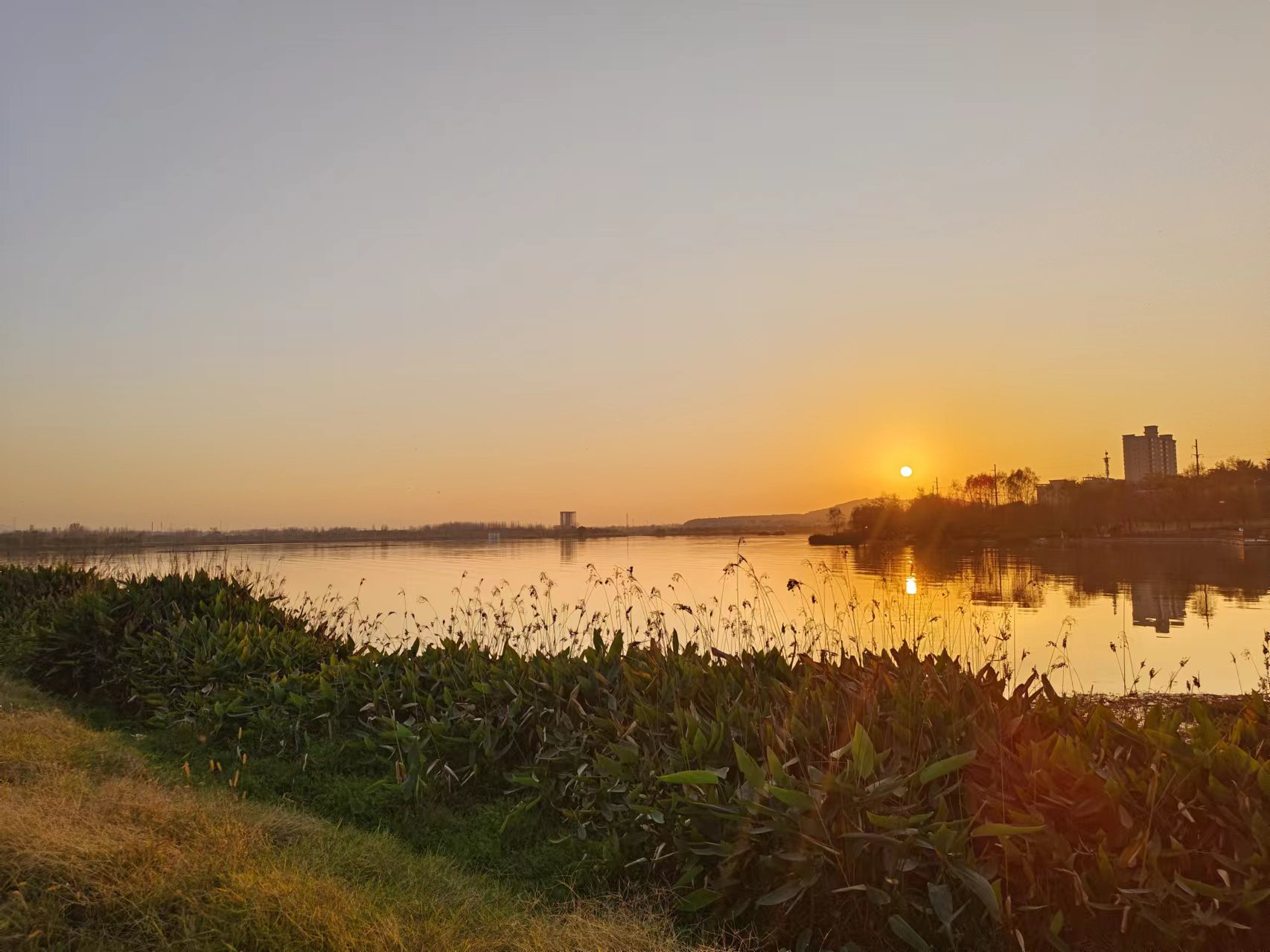
Sunset at Shimantan Reservoir

Wugang (simplified Chinese: 舞钢; traditional Chinese: 舞鋼; pinyin: Wǔgāng) is a county-level city in the south-central part of Henan province, China, administrated by Pingdingshan prefecture-level city. It has a population of approximately 320,000. It is home to one of China's biggest iron and steel companies: Wuyang Iron and Steel Company Limited, Hangang Group. Longquan Lake (Shimantan Reservoir) is located at the foot of the city with beautiful mountains surrounding it. This place has now become a hot tourist destination to neighbouring cities and provinces. The city region comprises three geological areas including Sipo, Yakou and Zhulan.

== History ==
In the 1970s, a large steel plant was built in this area, which was originally part of Wuyang County. With the development of the steel plant, the surrounding area gradually acquired a certain urban scale. In 1973, it was separated from Wuyang County. In December 1973, the "Henan Provincial Revolutionary Committee Wuyang Work Area Working Committee" was established with the approval of the Provincial Revolutionary Committee.

At present, the economic pillars of the entire city are still mining and steel. Wuyang Iron and Steel Company (a subsidiary of Hebei Iron and Steel Group) is the second largest steel company in Henan Province and the largest production base of extra-thick plates in China. Although its performance was not good in the past few years, it has improved in recent years after being merged by Hebei Handan Iron and Steel Group. Anyang Iron and Steel Company, another large steel company in Henan Province, has also established a mining base in Wugang. At the same time, Wugang has vigorously developed tourism in recent years. Among them, the tourist attractions represented by the Shimantan National Water Conservancy Scenic Area built on the basis of the Shimantan Reservoir are also well-known in the surrounding areas.

== Administrative divisions ==
As of 2012, this city is divided to 5 subdistricts, 3 towns and 5 townships.

Subdistricts

- Yakou Subdistrict (垭口街道)
- Sipo Subdistrict (寺坡街道)
- Zhulan Subdistrict (朱兰街道)
- Yuanling Subdistrict (院岭街道)
- Kuangjian Subdistrict (矿建街道)

Towns

- Shangdian (尚店镇)
- Batai (八台镇)
- Yinji (尹集镇)

Townships

- Zaolin Township (枣林乡)
- Miaojie Township (庙街乡)
- Tieshan Township (铁山乡)
- Wugong Township (武功乡)
- Yangzhuang Township (杨庄乡)

== Population ==
According to the seventh national census in 2020, the permanent population of Wugang City was 294,839, of which 50.36% were males and 49.64% were females. The population aged 0-14 years accounted for 22.71%, the population aged 15-59 years accounted for 54.86%, and the population aged 60 years and above accounted for 22.43%, of which the population aged 65 years and above accounted for 17.17%.

== Climate ==
Climate data for Wugang, elevation 90 m (300 ft), (1991–2020 normals, extremes 1981–2010)
Month	Jan	Feb	Mar	Apr	May	Jun	Jul	Aug	Sep	Oct	Nov	Dec	Year
Record high °C (°F)	19.4 (66.9)	23.7 (74.7)	30.0 (86.0)	35.0 (95.0)	38.4 (101.1)	39.4 (102.9)	40.6 (105.1)	38.8 (101.8)	39.0 (102.2)	34.3 (93.7)	27.7 (81.9)	20.7 (69.3)	40.6 (105.1)
Mean daily maximum °C (°F)	6.6 (43.9)	10.2 (50.4)	15.6 (60.1)	22.1 (71.8)	27.6 (81.7)	31.6 (88.9)	32.2 (90.0)	30.7 (87.3)	27.0 (80.6)	22.1 (71.8)	15.0 (59.0)	8.8 (47.8)	20.8 (69.4)
Daily mean °C (°F)	1.5 (34.7)	4.6 (40.3)	10.0 (50.0)	16.2 (61.2)	21.7 (71.1)	26.1 (79.0)	27.5 (81.5)	26.0 (78.8)	21.5 (70.7)	16.2 (61.2)	9.5 (49.1)	3.6 (38.5)	15.4 (59.7)
Mean daily minimum °C (°F)	−2.5 (27.5)	0.2 (32.4)	5.1 (41.2)	10.8 (51.4)	16.2 (61.2)	21.0 (69.8)	23.7 (74.7)	22.4 (72.3)	17.4 (63.3)	11.7 (53.1)	5.1 (41.2)	−0.3 (31.5)	10.9 (51.6)
Record low °C (°F)	−15.3 (4.5)	−12.2 (10.0)	−8.9 (16.0)	−0.7 (30.7)	4.4 (39.9)	11.7 (53.1)	16.9 (62.4)	13.3 (55.9)	7.9 (46.2)	−1.3 (29.7)	−10.3 (13.5)	−15.0 (5.0)	−15.3 (4.5)
Average precipitation mm (inches)	21.2 (0.83)	21.2 (0.83)	41.4 (1.63)	50.2 (1.98)	83.3 (3.28)	129.8 (5.11)	231.9 (9.13)	164.0 (6.46)	88.4 (3.48)	55.6 (2.19)	42.5 (1.67)	18.4 (0.72)	947.9 (37.31)
Average precipitation days (≥ 0.1 mm)	5.4	5.9	7.1	6.9	8.6	8.8	12.6	12.2	9.9	7.6	6.6	4.9	96.5
Average snowy days	4.9	3.4	1.4	0	0	0	0	0	0	0	1.1	2.9	13.7
Average relative humidity (%)	67	67	66	67	66	67	80	83	79	73	71	67	71
Mean monthly sunshine hours	117.6	126.3	160.4	187.7	196.3	182.9	179.5	164.4	143.2	141.8	129.7	126.0	1,855.8
Percentage possible sunshine	37	40	43	48	46	43	41	40	39	41	42	41	42
Source: China Meteorological Administration
