= Jing'an County =

Jing'an County 靖安县 Tsingan
- County
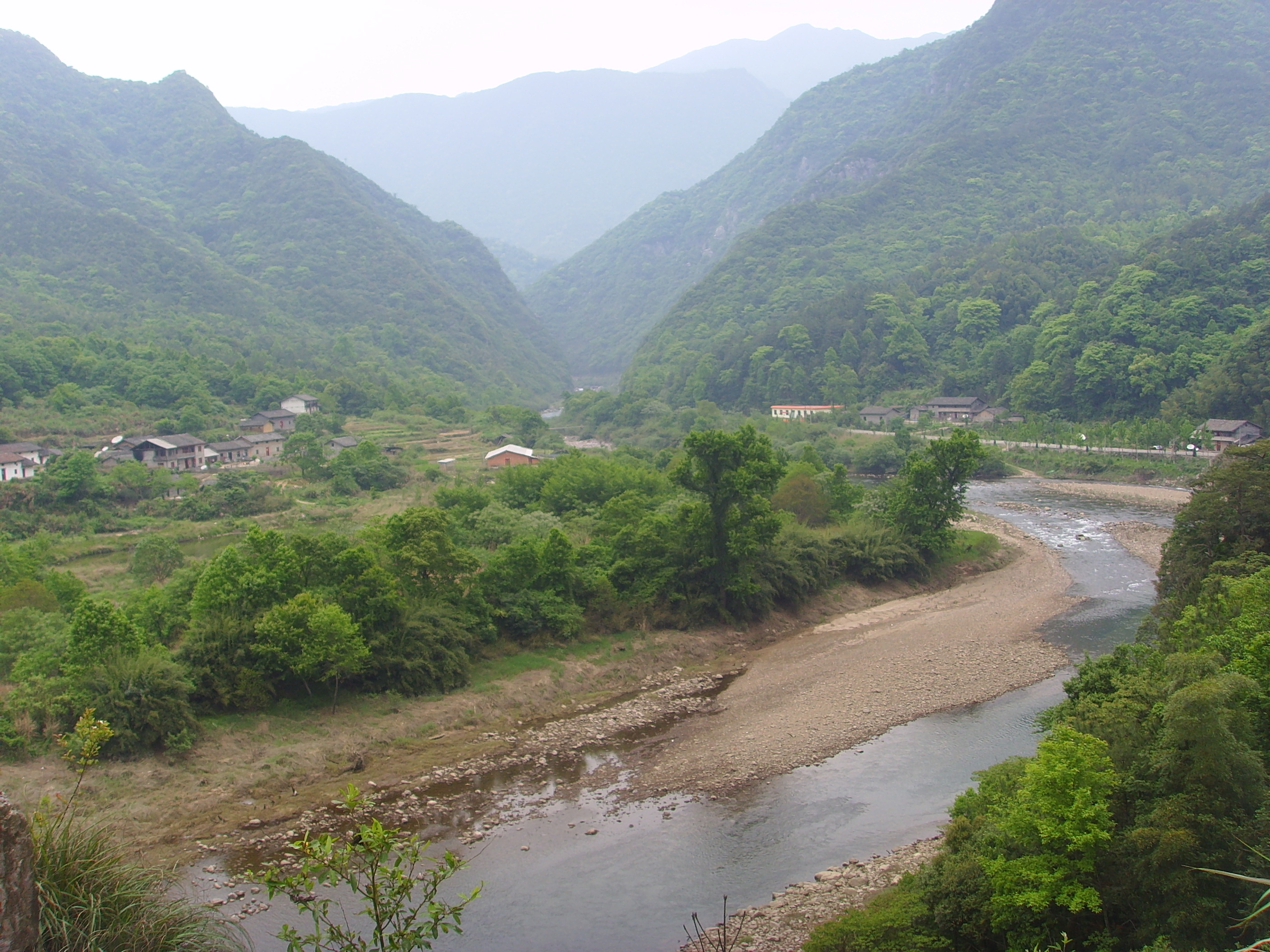

- Location in Jiangxi
- Coordinates: 28°57′N 115°14′E
- Country: People's Republic of China
- Province: Jiangxi
- Prefecture-level city: Yichun
- Time zone: UTC+8 (China Standard)

Jing'an County (simplified Chinese: 靖安县; traditional Chinese: 靖安縣; pinyin: Jìng'ān Xiàn) is a county in the northwest of Jiangxi province, People's Republic of China. It is under the jurisdiction of the prefecture-level city of Yichun.

== Administrative divisions ==
Jing'an County has 5 towns and 6 townships.

5 towns

- Shuangxi (双溪镇)
- Renshou (仁首镇)
- Baofeng (宝峰镇)
- Gaohu (高湖镇)
- Zaodu (躁都镇)

6 townships

- Xiangtian (香田乡)
- Shuikou (水口乡)
- Zhongyuan (中源乡)
- Luowan (罗湾乡)
- Sanzhualun (三爪仑乡)
- Leigongjian (雷公尖乡)

== Demographics ==
The population of the district was 137,407 in 1999.

== Climate ==
Climate data for Jing'an, elevation 79 m (259 ft), (1991–2020 normals, extremes 1981–2010)
Month	Jan	Feb	Mar	Apr	May	Jun	Jul	Aug	Sep	Oct	Nov	Dec	Year
Record high °C (°F)	24.2 (75.6)	28.1 (82.6)	32.7 (90.9)	34.1 (93.4)	35.7 (96.3)	37.2 (99.0)	39.0 (102.2)	39.9 (103.8)	37.4 (99.3)	34.8 (94.6)	30.8 (87.4)	23.5 (74.3)	39.9 (103.8)
Mean daily maximum °C (°F)	9.7 (49.5)	12.4 (54.3)	16.4 (61.5)	22.8 (73.0)	27.1 (80.8)	29.6 (85.3)	33.2 (91.8)	33.0 (91.4)	29.7 (85.5)	24.9 (76.8)	18.7 (65.7)	12.6 (54.7)	22.5 (72.5)
Daily mean °C (°F)	5.6 (42.1)	8.0 (46.4)	11.9 (53.4)	17.7 (63.9)	22.4 (72.3)	25.4 (77.7)	28.4 (83.1)	28.0 (82.4)	24.5 (76.1)	19.3 (66.7)	13.4 (56.1)	7.7 (45.9)	17.7 (63.8)
Mean daily minimum °C (°F)	2.8 (37.0)	5.0 (41.0)	8.6 (47.5)	14.1 (57.4)	18.8 (65.8)	22.3 (72.1)	24.8 (76.6)	24.5 (76.1)	21.0 (69.8)	15.6 (60.1)	9.9 (49.8)	4.3 (39.7)	14.3 (57.7)
Record low °C (°F)	−6.4 (20.5)	−4.8 (23.4)	−3.5 (25.7)	1.6 (34.9)	8.9 (48.0)	14.2 (57.6)	18.0 (64.4)	18.8 (65.8)	12.6 (54.7)	3.0 (37.4)	−1.6 (29.1)	−11.0 (12.2)	−11.0 (12.2)
Average precipitation mm (inches)	79.2 (3.12)	93.0 (3.66)	176.0 (6.93)	214.9 (8.46)	235.1 (9.26)	326.1 (12.84)	214.3 (8.44)	142.5 (5.61)	81.5 (3.21)	51.0 (2.01)	80.2 (3.16)	54.9 (2.16)	1,748.7 (68.86)
Average precipitation days (≥ 0.1 mm)	13.4	13.0	17.5	16.9	16.1	17.8	13.6	12.4	8.5	7.5	10.0	10.0	156.7
Average snowy days	2.8	1.2	0.4	0	0	0	0	0	0	0	0	0.9	5.3
Average relative humidity (%)	78	78	79	78	79	84	80	79	77	73	75	75	78
Mean monthly sunshine hours	83.2	82.3	93.8	118.4	134.8	120.9	196.2	196.1	168.8	157.5	131.5	121.2	1,604.7
Percentage possible sunshine	25	26	25	31	32	29	46	49	46	45	41	38	36
Source: China Meteorological Administration
