= Lixu =

Lixu 黎圩镇
- Town
- Location in Jiangxi Lixu (China)
- Coordinates: 28°04′07″N 116°38′08″E
- Country: People's Republic of China
- Province: Jiangxi
- Prefecture-level city: Fuzhou
- District: Dongxiang
- Elevation: 60 m (200 ft)
- Time zone: UTC+8 (China Standard)

Lixu (Chinese: 黎圩; pinyin: Líxū) is a town of Dongxiang District, Fuzhou, in northeastern Jiangxi province, China. As of 2018, it has 3 residential communities and 9 villages under its administration.

== See also ==
- List of township-level divisions of Jiangxi
