= Bailu Subdistrict, Yingtan =

Bailu Subdistrict 白露街道
- Subdistrict
- Location in Jiangxi Bailu Subdistrict (China)
- Coordinates: 28°14′28″N 117°1′4″E
- Country: People's Republic of China
- Province: Jiangxi
- Prefecture-level city: Yingtan
- District: Yuehu District
- Time zone: UTC+8 (China Standard)

Bailu Subdistrict (Chinese: 白露街道; pinyin: Báilù Jiēdào) is a subdistrict in Yuehu District, Yingtan, Jiangxi, China. As of 2018, it has 8 residential communities and 2 villages under its administration.

== See also ==
- List of township-level divisions of Jiangxi
