= Meiling, Jiangxi =

Meiling 梅岭镇
- Town
- Location in Jiangxi Meiling (China)
- Coordinates: 28°47′40″N 115°44′58″E
- Country: People's Republic of China
- Province: Jiangxi
- Prefecture-level city: Nanchang
- District: Wanli District

Area
  - Total: 67 km^{2} (26 sq mi)

Population
  - Total: Around 1.3 million
  - Density: 194/km^{2} (500/sq mi)
- Zip code: 330000
- Long distance code: 0791
- Licence number: Gan(赣)A
- Admin Code: 360105101
- First six bits of the code: 360105

Meiling (Chinese: 梅岭; pinyin: Méilǐng) is a scenic town located in Jiangxi province, Nanchang city, in the north of Wanli District, Nanchang. Meiling is located inside the Meiling National Forest Park. As of 2018, it has 2 residential communities, 3 residential quarters and 5 villages under its administration. These include the villages Meiling, Lixin (立新), Dongchang (东昌), Tuanjie (团结), Yuanjia (袁家), and the residential communities Dianqian (店前), Wayao (瓦窑), as well as living quarters of Xichang Zone (西昌分场), Xiangyang Forest Zone (向阳林场), and Xiaoling Forest Zone (小岭林场).

Over 80% of the area of Meiling town is hilly. Meiling's most abundant crop is rice, and is green with Mao bamboo and Pine. The beauty spots of Meiling town include Hongya Dan wells, Meiling Dragon pond, Bamboo Sea Pearl, XiYao Lake, and Lion peak. Meiling town is also known as "the little Mount Lu".

== Major Attractions ==
=== Hongya Dan wells ===
Hongya Dan wells(洪崖丹井) is one of the top ten scenery of Yuzhang (豫章)(Nanchang) as well as one of the oldest historic sites of China. The well existed since around 5500–6000 years ago. Hongya Dan wells is the leading scenery of Meiling, and is also said to be the origin of ancient Chinese music.

Ling Lun was the music officer of the Yellow Emperor. According to the legend, Ling Lun came to Hongya, and dug five wells. The posterity of Ling Lun call him Mr. Hongya. In the ninth year of the Sui dynasty, all the administrative regions of China were named "state". Because of Mr. Hongya, Yuzhang county was named Hong state.

=== Meiling Dragon pond ===
Dragon Pond (神龙潭) is located in the hinterland of the Meiling area, about 30 kilometres from Nanchang. Its natural scenery is the basis of the area, with mountain landscapes and folk customs forming its cultural characteristics. Dragon Pond is known for its winding streets, waterfalls and river. Its natural attractions include Longtan Waterfall, Tiger Spring Falls, Lake Tam Tam Falls, Dragon Valley, Lanzhu River, Buddha Ridge and a millennium-old yew tree.

=== Bamboo Sea Pearl ===
Meiling Bamboo Pearl(竹海明珠)is formerly known as Meiling peak, located in the hinterland of Meiling scenic area. 12 km away from the Bay City, 27 km from the center of Nanchang. Scenic area is 6.2 square kilometers, there are "flowers old ridge", Sword trying peak, Wulao mount, Yang mount and another dozen peaks. The main peak's height is more than 800 meters above sea level.

=== XiYao Lake ===
XiYao lake(洗药湖)is located in Luohan mountain, the highest peak of the scenic area in Meiling in Nanchang, 841 meters above the sea level, and the average temperature is 8-10 degrees lower than the urban area of Nanchang, is one of the thirteen summer resort in China.

=== Lion peak ===
Meiling Lion Peak (狮子峰) consists of Lion Peak, Panxi Lake and Looking Lion Stream. The mountain is shaped like a crouching lion, from which it derives its name. Meiling Lion Peak is 260 metres high and features steep slopes, cliffs, unusual rock formations and forests. Mount Feilai (飞来峰) is characterised by granite inverted-pile landforms, which reflect the area's megalithic mountain structure and geological formation.
