= Quannan County =

Quannan County 全南县
- County
- Location of Quannan County (red) in Jiangxi
- Coordinates: 24°52′13″N 114°24′54″E
- Country: People's Republic of China
- Province: Jiangxi
- Prefecture-level city: Ganzhou

Area
  - Total: 1,535 km^{2} (593 sq mi)

Population (2019)
  - Total: 196,100
  - Density: 128/km^{2} (330/sq mi)
- Postal Code: 341800

Quannan County (simplified Chinese: 全南县; traditional Chinese: 全南縣; pinyin: Quánnán Xiàn) is a county under the jurisdiction of Ganzhou City. It is located in the far southwest of Jiangxi province, People's Republic of China.

As of April 2026, Quannan County is divided into 9 towns, administered as 6 towns and 3 townships.

== Administrative divisions ==
In the present, Quannan County has 6 towns and 3 townships.

6 towns

- Chengxiang (城厢镇)
- Dajishan (大吉山镇)
- Beitou (陂头镇)
- Jinlong (金龙镇)
- Nanjing (南迳镇)
- Longyuanba (龙源坝镇)

3 townships

- Zhongzhai (中寨乡)
- Shejing (社迳乡)
- Longxia (龙下乡)

== Climate ==
Climate data for Quannan, elevation 277 m (909 ft), (1991–2020 normals, extremes 1981–2010)
Month	Jan	Feb	Mar	Apr	May	Jun	Jul	Aug	Sep	Oct	Nov	Dec	Year
Record high °C (°F)	27.1 (80.8)	31.0 (87.8)	32.2 (90.0)	33.7 (92.7)	35.5 (95.9)	36.9 (98.4)	38.8 (101.8)	39.2 (102.6)	36.9 (98.4)	35.2 (95.4)	34.1 (93.4)	28.6 (83.5)	39.2 (102.6)
Mean daily maximum °C (°F)	14.6 (58.3)	17.0 (62.6)	19.8 (67.6)	25.0 (77.0)	28.7 (83.7)	31.2 (88.2)	33.4 (92.1)	32.9 (91.2)	30.4 (86.7)	26.7 (80.1)	22.0 (71.6)	16.7 (62.1)	24.9 (76.8)
Daily mean °C (°F)	9.0 (48.2)	11.4 (52.5)	14.8 (58.6)	19.8 (67.6)	23.6 (74.5)	26.1 (79.0)	27.4 (81.3)	26.9 (80.4)	24.7 (76.5)	20.5 (68.9)	15.6 (60.1)	10.4 (50.7)	19.2 (66.5)
Mean daily minimum °C (°F)	5.6 (42.1)	7.9 (46.2)	11.5 (52.7)	16.4 (61.5)	20.2 (68.4)	22.7 (72.9)	23.5 (74.3)	23.4 (74.1)	21.1 (70.0)	16.4 (61.5)	11.5 (52.7)	6.5 (43.7)	15.6 (60.0)
Record low °C (°F)	−4.6 (23.7)	−3.3 (26.1)	−2.4 (27.7)	4.8 (40.6)	10.2 (50.4)	13.5 (56.3)	18.9 (66.0)	18.7 (65.7)	11.7 (53.1)	4.4 (39.9)	−1.4 (29.5)	−6.8 (19.8)	−6.8 (19.8)
Average precipitation mm (inches)	74.1 (2.92)	93.5 (3.68)	187.6 (7.39)	220.6 (8.69)	243.3 (9.58)	261.8 (10.31)	140.8 (5.54)	185.8 (7.31)	125.5 (4.94)	42.9 (1.69)	53.3 (2.10)	51.1 (2.01)	1,680.3 (66.16)
Average precipitation days (≥ 0.1 mm)	10.4	12.8	18.1	17.3	18.2	18.5	15.3	16.2	10.9	5.9	7.8	7.9	159.3
Average snowy days	0.5	0.3	0	0	0	0	0	0	0	0	0	0.3	1.1
Average relative humidity (%)	78	80	84	83	83	84	80	82	81	77	78	76	81
Mean monthly sunshine hours	91.9	79.5	69.3	81.5	107.5	124.9	190.4	174.2	143.9	150.8	133.9	125.5	1,473.3
Percentage possible sunshine	27	25	19	21	26	31	46	44	39	42	41	38	33
Source: China Meteorological Administration
