= Daqiao Subdistrict, Zhangshu =

Daqiao Subdistrict 大桥街道
- Subdistrict
- Location in Jiangxi Daqiao (China)
- Coordinates: 28°3′53″N 115°32′54″E
- Country: People's Republic of China
- Province: Jiangxi
- Prefecture-level city: Yichun
- County-level city: Zhangshu
- Time zone: UTC+8 (China Standard)

Daqiao Subdistrict (simplified Chinese: 大桥街道; traditional Chinese: 大橋街道; pinyin: Dàqiáo Jiēdào) is a subdistrict in Zhangshu, Jiangxi province, China. As of 2018, it has 2 residential communities and 12 villages under its administration.

== See also ==
- List of township-level divisions of Jiangxi
