= Renmin Road Subdistrict, Jiujiang =

Renmin Road Subdistrict 人民路街道
- Subdistrict
- Location in Jiangxi Renmin Road Subdistrict (China)
- Coordinates: 29.7063°N 115.9818°E
- Country: China
- Province: Jiangxi
- Prefecture-level city: Jiujiang
- District: Xunyang District
- Time zone: UTC+8 (China Standard Time)

Renmin Road Subdistrict (Chinese: 人民路街道; pinyin: Rénmínlù Jiēdào) is a subdistrict situated in Xunyang District, Jiujiang, Jiangxi, China. As of 2020, it administers Changhong Village (长虹村) and the following 19 residential neighborhoods:

- Renmin Road Community
- Shanchuanling Community (山川岭社区)
- Taoyuan Community (桃园社区)
- Shazidun Community (沙子墩社区)
- Xiangyangzha Community (向阳闸社区)
- Xincun Community (新村社区)
- Xingfuli Community (幸福里社区)
- Xindongfang Community (新东方社区)
- Lunan Community (庐南社区)
- Huposhan Community (琥珀山社区)
- Laomadu Community (老马渡社区)
- Yaojiawa Community (姚家洼社区)
- Dashuxia Community (大树下社区)
- Hubin Community (湖滨社区)
- Huangtuling Community (黄土岭社区)
- Gongdianju Community (供电局社区)
- Liangmudi Community (两亩地社区)
- Dehua Community (德化社区)
- Sunjialong Community (孙家垅社区)

== See also ==
- List of township-level divisions of Jiangxi
