= Gaohu, Jiangxi =

Gaohu 高湖镇
- Town
- Location in Jiangxi Gaohu (China)
- Coordinates: 28°55′40″N 115°14′23″E
- Country: People's Republic of China
- Province: Jiangxi
- Prefecture-level city: Yichun
- County: Jing'an
- Elevation: 104 m (341 ft)
- Time zone: UTC+8 (China Standard)
- Postal code: 330600
- Area code: 0795

Gaohu (Chinese: 高湖; pinyin: Gāohú; lit. 'high lake') is a town of Jing'an County in northwestern Jiangxi province, China, located 13 kilometres (8.1 mi) northwest of the county seat. As of 2018, it has one residential community (社区), 7 villages, and a forest area under its administration.

== See also ==
- List of township-level divisions of Jiangxi
