= Guangxin, Shangrao =

Guangxin 广信区 Shangjao
- District
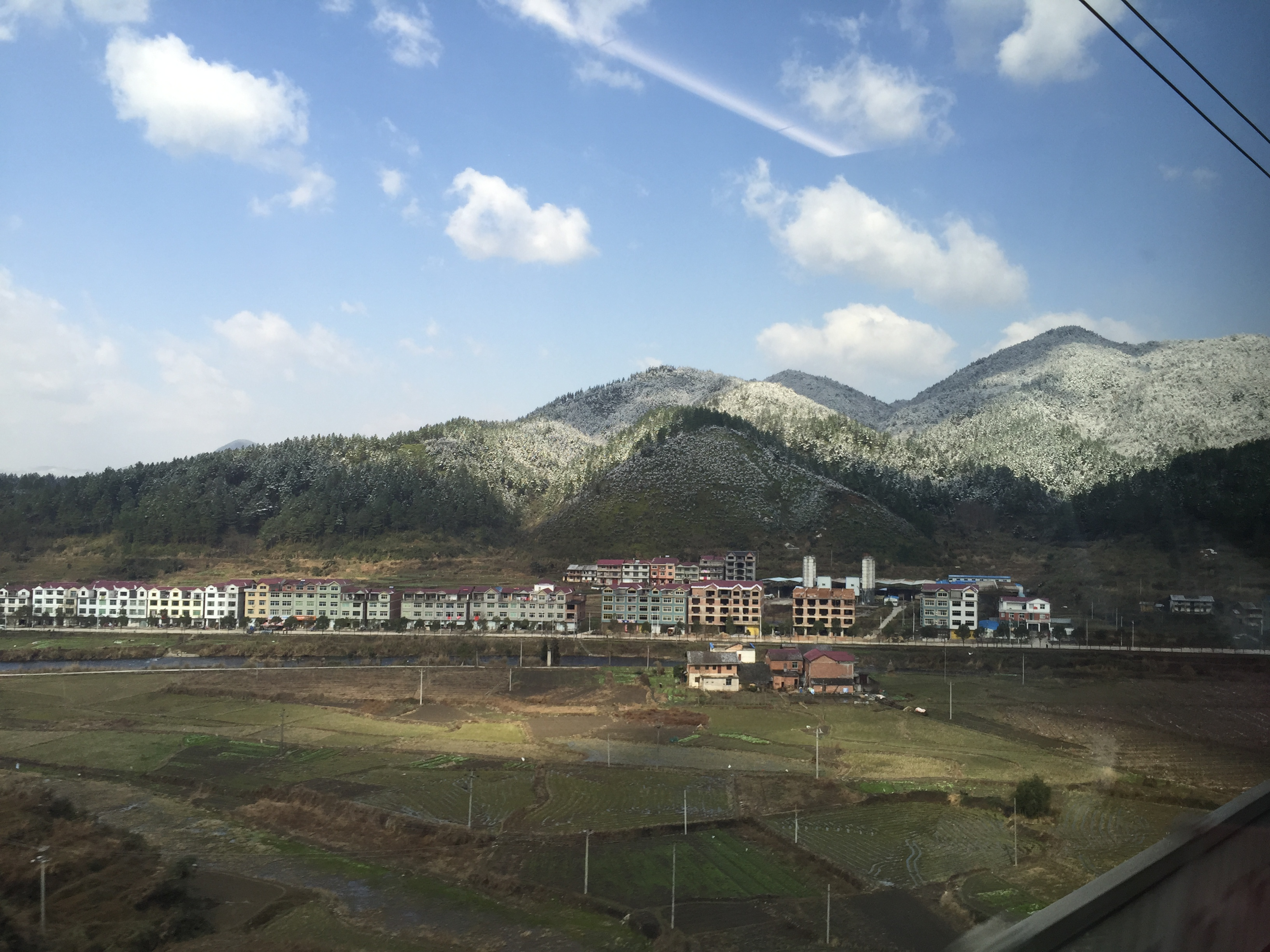
- The town of Wufushan in the January 2016 East Asia cold wave

- Guangxin in Jiangxi
- Coordinates: 28°26′56″N 117°54′29″E
- Country: People's Republic of China
- Province: Jiangxi
- Prefecture-level city: Shangrao

Area
  - Total: 2,240 km^{2} (860 sq mi)

Population (2017)
  - Total: 848,144
  - Density: 379/km^{2} (981/sq mi)
- Time zone: UTC+8 (China Standard)
- Postal Code: 334100

Guangxin District (simplified Chinese: 广信区; traditional Chinese: 廣信區; pinyin: Guǎngxìn qū) formerly, Shangrao County (simplified Chinese: 上饶县; traditional Chinese: 上饒縣; pinyin: Shàngráo Xiàn), is a district in the northeast of Jiangxi province, People's Republic of China, bordering Fujian province to the south. It is under the jurisdiction of the prefecture-level city of Shangrao.

== Administrative divisions ==
At present, Guangxin District has 3 subdistricts, 11 towns and 10 townships.

3 subdistricts

- Xuri (旭日街道)
- Luoqiao (罗桥街道)
- Xingyuan (兴园街道)

11 towns

- Tiandun (田墩镇)
- Shanglu (上泸镇)
- Huatanshan (华坛山镇)
- Chating (茶亭镇)
- Zaotou (皂头镇)
- Sishiba (四十八镇)
- Fenglingtou (枫岭头镇)
- Huanggu (煌固镇)
- Huating (花厅镇)
- Wufushan (五府山镇)
- Zhengfang (郑坊镇)

10 townships

- Wangxian (望仙乡)
- Shiren (石人乡)
- Qingshui (清水乡)
- Shishi (石狮乡)
- Hucun (湖村乡)
- Zunqiao (尊桥乡)
- Yingjiaxiang (应家乡)
- Huangshaling (黄沙岭乡)
- Tieshan (铁山乡)
- Dongtuan (董团乡)

== Demographics ==
The population of the district was 660,674 in 1999.

== Climate ==
Guangxin has a humid subtropical climate (Cfa) with very hot summers and cool winters.

Climate data for Guangxin, elevation 91 m (299 ft), (1991–2020 normals, extremes 1981–present)
Month	Jan	Feb	Mar	Apr	May	Jun	Jul	Aug	Sep	Oct	Nov	Dec	Year
Record high °C (°F)	26.1 (79.0)	29.2 (84.6)	34.4 (93.9)	35.9 (96.6)	36.7 (98.1)	39.0 (102.2)	42.0 (107.6)	41.6 (106.9)	39.0 (102.2)	37.4 (99.3)	32.4 (90.3)	25.4 (77.7)	42.0 (107.6)
Mean daily maximum °C (°F)	10.9 (51.6)	13.6 (56.5)	18.0 (64.4)	24.0 (75.2)	28.4 (83.1)	30.7 (87.3)	35.4 (95.7)	34.7 (94.5)	30.9 (87.6)	25.8 (78.4)	19.4 (66.9)	13.2 (55.8)	23.8 (74.7)
Daily mean °C (°F)	6.8 (44.2)	9.0 (48.2)	13.1 (55.6)	18.6 (65.5)	23.3 (73.9)	26.1 (79.0)	30.1 (86.2)	29.4 (84.9)	26.0 (78.8)	20.8 (69.4)	14.6 (58.3)	8.6 (47.5)	18.9 (66.0)
Mean daily minimum °C (°F)	4.0 (39.2)	6.0 (42.8)	9.5 (49.1)	14.7 (58.5)	19.6 (67.3)	22.8 (73.0)	26.0 (78.8)	25.6 (78.1)	22.3 (72.1)	17.1 (62.8)	11.3 (52.3)	5.4 (41.7)	15.4 (59.6)
Record low °C (°F)	−5.4 (22.3)	−4.4 (24.1)	−2.5 (27.5)	5.3 (41.5)	10.6 (51.1)	15.2 (59.4)	20.6 (69.1)	20.0 (68.0)	14.4 (57.9)	3.8 (38.8)	0.1 (32.2)	−5.4 (22.3)	−5.4 (22.3)
Average precipitation mm (inches)	88.4 (3.48)	121.6 (4.79)	202.5 (7.97)	241.0 (9.49)	243.6 (9.59)	376.7 (14.83)	139.4 (5.49)	102.9 (4.05)	79.1 (3.11)	57.5 (2.26)	112.8 (4.44)	77.2 (3.04)	1,842.7 (72.54)
Average precipitation days (≥ 0.1 mm)	13.8	14.6	17.6	16.5	16.2	17.6	10.7	11.7	9.0	8.0	11.3	10.7	157.7
Average snowy days	1.7	1.3	0.2	0	0	0	0	0	0	0	0	0.6	3.8
Average relative humidity (%)	75	75	74	72	73	78	69	70	70	67	74	72	72
Mean monthly sunshine hours	84.7	84.5	107.7	129.1	142.5	130.4	239.1	220.0	176.3	164.3	128.2	112.5	1,719.3
Percentage possible sunshine	26	27	29	33	34	31	56	55	48	47	40	35	38
Source: China Meteorological Administration
