= Chenguang =

Chinese machinery manufacturing group

Chenguang Group is a machinery manufacturing group headquartered in Nanjing, China. Its predecessor, Jinling Machinery Manufacturing Bureau, was founded in late Qing (1865 CE) by Li Hongzhang, the Acting Viceroy of Liangjiang. The plant moved to Kaohsiung, Taiwan, ROC during the civil war. The remained in mainland became Ordnance General Plant in PRC. It later subordinated to CASIC. The plant renamed Chenguang Machinery Plant in 1980 and became Chenguang Group in 1996.

Its subsidiary company Aerosun was listed in Shanghai Stock Exchanges in 2001.
