= Zhanggong, Sichuan =

Zhanggong 张公镇
- Town
- Location in Sichuan
- Coordinates: 31°38′26″N 106°24′18″E
- Country: People's Republic of China
- Province: Sichuan
- Prefecture-level city: Nanchong
- County: Yilong County
- Time zone: UTC+8 (China Standard)

Zhanggong (simplified Chinese: 张公; traditional Chinese: 張公; pinyin: Zhānggōng) is a town under the administration of Yilong County, Sichuan, China. As of 2018, it has one residential community and 13 villages under its administration.
