= Zixiao, Nanfeng County =

Zixiao 紫霄镇
- Town
- Location in Jiangxi Zixiao (China)
- Coordinates: 27°07′32″N 116°34′01″E
- Country: People's Republic of China
- Province: Jiangxi
- Prefecture-level city: Fuzhou
- County: Nanfeng County
- Time zone: UTC+8 (China Standard)

Zixiao (simplified Chinese: 紫霄镇; traditional Chinese: 桑紫鎮; pinyin: Zǐxiāo Zhèn) is a town-level administrative unit under the jurisdiction of Nanfeng County, Fuzhou City, Jiangxi Province, People's Republic of China. As of 2017, it has 19 villages under its administration.

== Administrative Divisions ==
Zixiao has jurisdiction over the following areas:

- Dalingbei Village
- Dongcun
- Gem Village
- Hexi Village
- Huanglongkeng Village
- Huangsha Village
- Luofong Village
- Mingyang Village
- Qia Village
- Raojia Village
- Shanggu Village
- Xidong Village
- Xikeng Village
- Xintian Village
- Xixi Village
- Yucun Village
- Zhoufang Village
- Zhufang Village
