= Shixia Township, Shanxi =

Shixia Township 石匣乡
- Township
- Location in Shanxi
- Coordinates: 37°6′24″N 113°17′54″E
- Country: People's Republic of China
- Province: Shanxi
- Prefecture-level city: Jinzhong
- County: Zuoquan County
- Time zone: UTC+8 (China Standard)

Shixia Township (simplified Chinese: 石匣乡; traditional Chinese: 石匣鄉; pinyin: Shíxiá Xiāng) is a township under the administration of Zuoquan County, Shanxi, China. As of 2018, it has 28 villages under its administration.
