= Tieshan Township, Jiangxi =

Tieshan Township 铁山乡
- Township
- Location in Jiangxi Tieshan Township (China)
- Coordinates: 28°13′6″N 118°5′34″E
- Country: People's Republic of China
- Province: Jiangxi
- Prefecture-level city: Shangrao
- District: Guangxin District
- Time zone: UTC+8 (China Standard)

Tieshan Township (simplified Chinese: 铁山乡; traditional Chinese: 鐵山鄉; pinyin: Tiěshān Xiāng) is a township in Guangxin District, Shangrao, Jiangxi, China. As of 2020, it administers the following five villages:

- Tieshan Village
- Xiyan Village (西岩村)
- Jiushi She Ethnic Village (九狮畲族村)
- Xiaoxi Village (小溪村)
- Daxi Village (大溪村)
