= Qinfeng, Jiangxi =

Qinfeng 秦峰镇
- Town
- Location in Jiangxi Qinfeng (China)
- Country: People's Republic of China
- Province: Jiangxi
- Prefecture-level city: Shangrao
- District: Xinzhou District

Area
  - Total: 57.2 km^{2} (22.1 sq mi)

Population (2010)
  - Total: 38,157
- Time zone: UTC+8 (China Standard Time)

Qinfeng is a town in Xinzhou District, Shangrao, Jiangxi, China. Prior to 2016 it was known as Qinfeng Township.
