= Xunyang, Jiujiang =

Xunyang 浔阳区
- District
- Interactive map of Xunyang
- Coordinates: 29°43′44″N 115°59′25.4″E
- Country: People's Republic of China
- Province: Jiangxi
- Prefecture-level city: Jiujiang

Area
  - Total: 26 km^{2} (10 sq mi)

Population (2017)
  - Total: 318,800
  - Density: 12,000/km^{2} (32,000/sq mi)
- Time zone: UTC+8 (China Standard)
- Postal code: 332000
- Website: www.xunyang.gov.cn

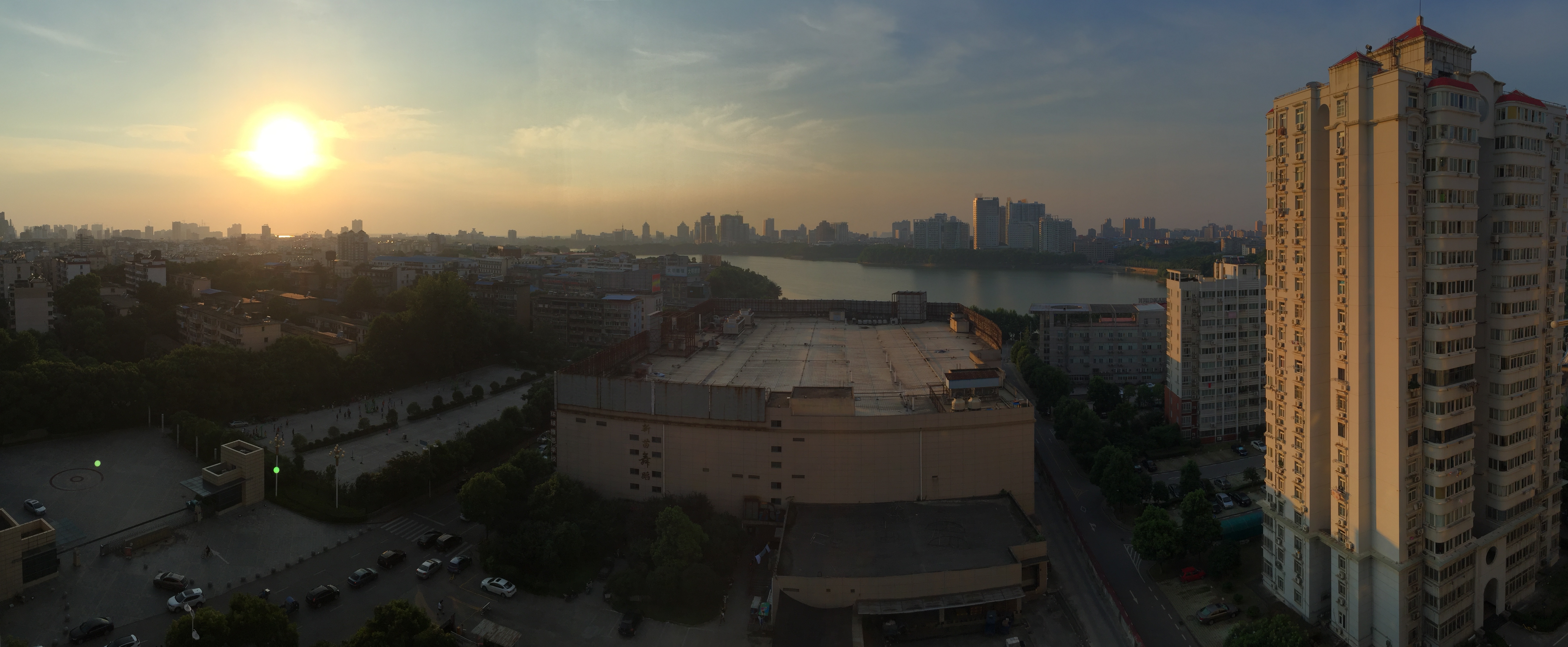
Xunyang District of Jiujiang.

Xunyang District (simplified Chinese: 浔阳区; traditional Chinese: 潯陽區; pinyin: Xúnyáng Qū) is a district and the municipal seat of the city of Jiujiang, Jiangxi province, China.

== Administrative divisions ==
Xunyang District has 7 subdistricts.

7 subdistricts

- Gantang (甘棠街道)
- Penpu (湓浦街道)
- Renminlu (人民路街道)
- Baishuihu (白水湖街道)
- Jinjipo (金鸡坡街道)
- Xiangyang (向阳街道)
- Binxing (滨兴街道)

== Transport ==
- Beijing–Kowloon railway
