= Tieshan Township, Hunan =

Tieshan Township 铁山乡
- Township
- Location in Hunan
- Coordinates: 27°16′39″N 110°18′14″E
- Country: People's Republic of China
- Province: Hunan
- Prefecture-level city: Huaihua
- County-level city: Hongjiang
- Time zone: UTC+8 (China Standard)

Tieshan Township (simplified Chinese: 铁山乡; traditional Chinese: 鐵山鄉; pinyin: Tiěshān Xiāng) is a township in Hongjiang, Hunan, China. As of 2020, it administers the following seven villages:

- Tieshan Village
- Liangzhuwan Village (凉竹湾村)
- Yuanjiaxi Village (袁家溪村)
- Daduan Village (大段村)
- Shuikoushan Village (水口山村)
- Xiaoxi Village (小溪村)
- Subaoding Village (苏宝顶村)
