= Yongning, Jiangxi =

Yongning 永宁镇
- Town
- Location in Jiangxi Yongning (China)
- Coordinates: 28°31′41″N 114°22′40″E
- Country: People's Republic of China
- Province: Jiangxi
- Prefecture-level city: Yichun
- County: Tonggu County
- Time zone: UTC+8 (China Standard)

Yongning (simplified Chinese: 永宁; traditional Chinese: 永寧; pinyin: Yǒngníng) is a town under the administration of Tonggu County, Jiangxi, China. As of 2018, it has 6 residential communities, 10 villages, and one forest farm under its administration.
