= Tieshan Subdistrict, Wugang =

Tieshan Subdistrict 铁山街道
- Subdistrict
- Location in Henan
- Coordinates: 33°20′7″N 113°32′25″E
- Country: People's Republic of China
- Province: Henan
- Prefecture-level city: Pingdingshan
- County-level city: Wugang
- Time zone: UTC+8 (China Standard)

Tieshan Subdistrict (simplified Chinese: 铁山街道; traditional Chinese: 鐵山街道; pinyin: Tiěshān Jiēdào) is a subdistrict in Wugang, Pingdingshan, Henan, China. As of 2020, it administers the following ten villages:

- Zhaoziying Village (找子营村)
- Shuikengzhao Village (水坑赵村)
- Zhongli Village (冢李村)
- Baochong Village (薄冲村)
- Hanzhuang Village (韩庄村)
- Biandanli Village (扁担李村)
- Fuzhuang Village (付庄村)
- Shangcao Village (上曹村)
- Zhongcao Village (中曹村)
- Qianzhang Village (前张村)

== See also ==
- List of township-level divisions of Henan
