= 陸州 =

陸州 may refer to:

- Mutsu Province, all abbreviated name was following Rikushū (陸州)
  - Rikuchū Province, province of Japan located in what is today Iwate and Akita Prefectures
  - Rikuzen Province, province of Japan located in what is today Miyagi Prefecture (excluding Igu, Katta and Watari Districts) and parts of Iwate Prefecture (specifically Kesen District)
- Lu Prefecture (Guangxi) (陸州), a prefecture between the 7th and 9th centuries in modern Vietnam and Guangxi, China
