= Qiawan, Nanfeng County =

Qiawan 洽湾镇
- Town
- Location in Jiangxi Qiawan (China)
- Coordinates: 27°16′28″N 116°34′32″E
- Country: People's Republic of China
- Province: Jiangxi
- Prefecture-level city: Fuzhou
- County: Nanfeng County
- Time zone: UTC+8 (China Standard)

Qiawan (simplified Chinese: 洽湾镇; traditional Chinese: 洽湾鎮; pinyin: Qiàwān Zhèn) is a town-level administrative unit under the jurisdiction of Nanfeng County, Fuzhou City, Jiangxi Province, People's Republic of China. As of 2017, it has 11 villages under its administration.

== Administrative Divisions ==
Qiawan has jurisdiction over the following areas:

Qiawan Village, Shangdian Village, Huangjia Village, Likeng Village, Upstream Village, Huangfang Village, Xiping Village, Shijie Village, Changling Village, Taoyuan Village and Jiajin Village.
