= Huaizhong =

Huaizhong is a Chinese given name. Notable people with the name include:

- Xu Huaizhong (1929–2023), Chinese novelist
- Wang Huaizhong (1946–2004), Chinese politician
