= Xinzhou, Shangrao =

Xinzhou 信州区
- District
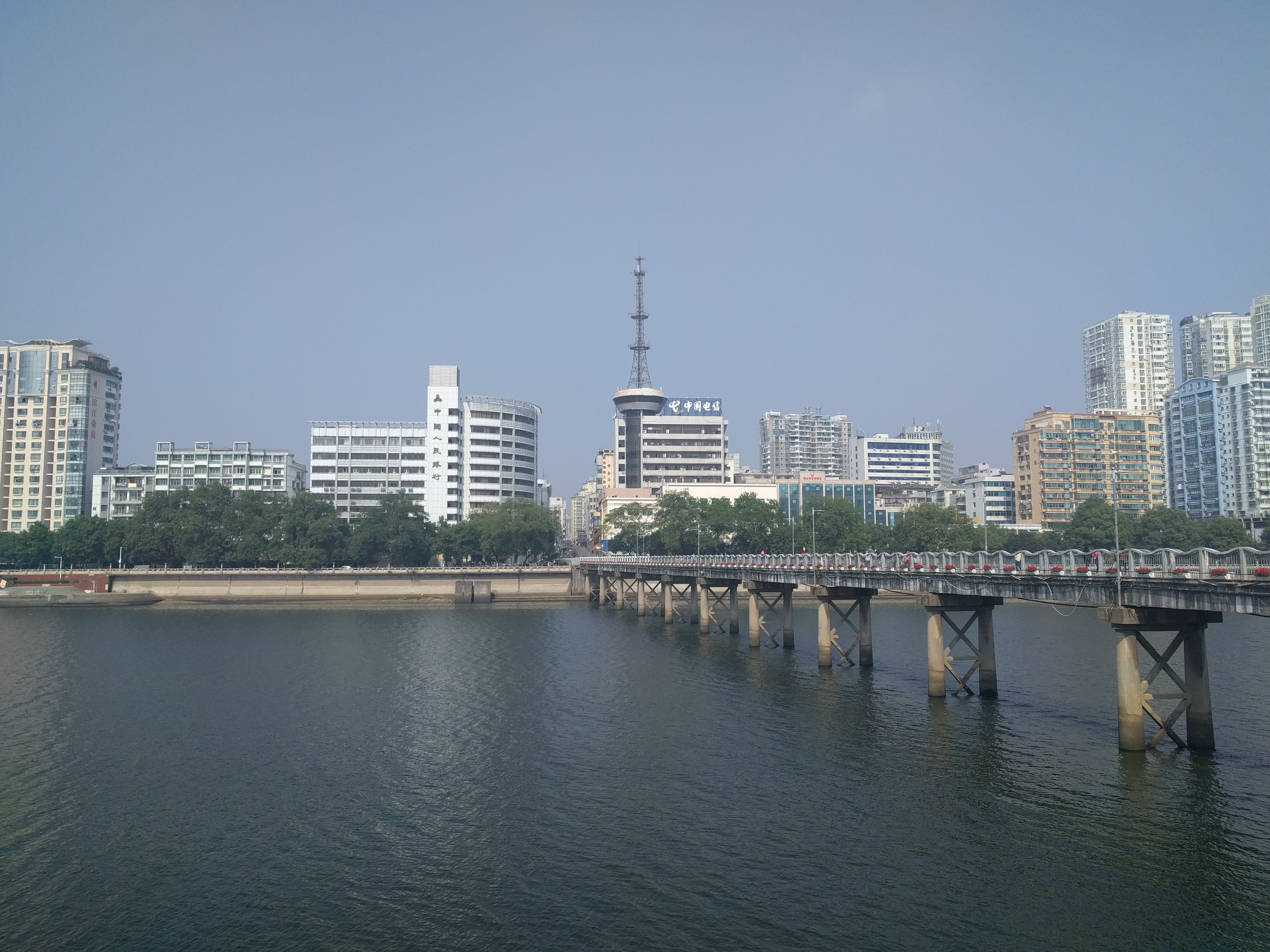
- Interactive map of Xinzhou
- Coordinates: 28°25′52″N 117°57′58″E
- Country: People's Republic of China
- Province: Jiangxi
- Prefecture-level city: Shangrao

Area
  - Total: 339 km^{2} (131 sq mi)

Population (2017)
  - Total: 427,000
  - Density: 1,260/km^{2} (3,260/sq mi)
- Time zone: UTC+8 (China Standard)
- Postal code: 334000

Xinzhou District (Chinese: 信州区; pinyin: Xìnzhōu Qū) is an urban district and the seat of the city of Shangrao, Jiangxi province, China.

== Administrative divisions ==
At present, Xinzhou District has 6 subdistricts and 3 towns.

6 subdistricts

- Shuinan (水南街道)
- Dongshi (东市街道)
- Xishi (西市街道)
- Beimen (北门街道)
- Maojialing (茅家岭街道)
- Lingxi (灵溪街道)

3 towns

- Shaxi (沙溪镇)
- Chaoyang (朝阳镇)
- Qinfeng (秦峰镇)
