= Wanli District, Nanchang =

Wanli 湾里区
- District
- Interactive map of Wanli
- Coordinates: 28°42′53″N 115°43′51″E
- Country: People's Republic of China
- Province: Jiangxi
- Prefecture-level city: Nanchang
- Time zone: UTC+8 (China Standard)

Wanli District (simplified Chinese: 湾里区; traditional Chinese: 灣里區; pinyin: Wānlǐ Qū) was an urban district of the prefecture-level city of Nanchang, the capital of Jiangxi Province, China. It covered over 254 km^{2} (98 sq mi) in the northwestern part of Nanchang, within the West Mountains. More than 70% is forest-covered, and the majority of the economy is natural resource based, with forestry and Chinese medicinal herbs predominating. In 2004, it had a population of 80,000.

In December 2019, Wanli was merged into neighboring Xinjian District.

== Administrative divisions ==
It is divided into 2 sub-districts, 3 towns, and 1 township.

=== Sub-districts ===
- Zhanqian (站前街道)
- Xinfu (幸福街道)

=== Towns ===
- Zhaoxian (招贤镇)
- Meiling (梅岭镇)
- Luoting (罗亭镇)

=== Township ===
- Taiping (太平乡)
