= Zhanggong, Jinxian County =

Zhanggong 张公镇
- Town
- Location in Jiangxi Zhanggong (China)
- Coordinates: 28°22′4″N 116°10′48″E
- Country: People's Republic of China
- Province: Jiangxi
- Prefecture-level city: Nanchang
- County: Jinxian County
- Time zone: UTC+8 (China Standard)

Zhanggong (simplified Chinese: 张公; traditional Chinese: 張公; pinyin: Zhānggōng) is a town located to the south of Nanchang, the capital of China's Jiangxi Province. It is under the administration of Jinxian County. As of 2018, it has one residential community, 12 villages and one research institute community under its administration.
