= Luzhou Township =

Luzhou Township 芦洲乡
- Township
- Location in Jiangxi Luzhou Township (China)
- Coordinates: 28°12′25″N 114°50′25″E
- Country: People's Republic of China
- Province: Jiangxi
- Prefecture-level city: Yichun
- County: Shanggao County
- Time zone: UTC+8 (China Standard)

Luzhou Township (simplified Chinese: 芦洲乡; traditional Chinese: 蘆洲鄉; pinyin: Lúzhōu Xiāng) is a township under the administration of Shanggao County, Jiangxi, China. As of 2018, it has one residential community and 11 villages under its administration.
