= Shixia Township, Jiangxi =

Shixia Township 石峡乡
- Township
- Location in Jiangxi Shixia Township (China)
- Coordinates: 27°40′25″N 116°54′14″E
- Country: People's Republic of China
- Province: Jiangxi
- Prefecture-level city: Fuzhou
- County: Zixi County
- Time zone: UTC+8 (China Standard)

Shixia Township (simplified Chinese: 石峡乡; traditional Chinese: 石峽鄉; pinyin: Shíxiá Xiāng) is a township under the administration of Zixi County, Jiangxi, China. As of 2018, it has 7 villages and one forest area residential zone under its administration.
