= List of administrative divisions of Jiangxi =

Jiangxi Province
- Province
- Capital: Nanchang

Prefecture-level divisions
- Prefectural cities: 11

County level divisions
- County cities: 12
- Counties: 61
- Districts: 27

Township level divisions
- Towns: 770
- Townships: 651
- Ethnic townships: 7
- Subdistricts: 120

Villages level divisions
- Communities: 3,431
- Administrative villages: 17,047

Jiangxi, a province of the People's Republic of China, is made up of the following three levels of administrative division.

== Administrative divisions ==
All of these administrative divisions are explained in greater detail at Administrative divisions of the People's Republic of China. This chart lists only prefecture-level and county-level divisions of Jiangxi.

Prefecture level	County Level				
Prefecture level	Name	Chinese	Hanyu Pinyin	Division code	
Nanchang city 南昌市; Nánchāng Shì (Capital) (3601 / KHN)	Donghu District	东湖区	Dōnghú Qū	360102	DHU
Nanchang city 南昌市; Nánchāng Shì (Capital) (3601 / KHN)	Xihu District	西湖区	Xīhú Qū	360103	XHQ
Nanchang city 南昌市; Nánchāng Shì (Capital) (3601 / KHN)	Qingyunpu District	青云谱区	Qīngyúnpǔ Qū	360104	QYP
Nanchang city 南昌市; Nánchāng Shì (Capital) (3601 / KHN)	Qingshanhu District	青山湖区	Qīngshānhú Qū	360111	QSH
Nanchang city 南昌市; Nánchāng Shì (Capital) (3601 / KHN)	Xinjian District	新建区	Xīnjiàn Qū	360112	XJQ
Nanchang city 南昌市; Nánchāng Shì (Capital) (3601 / KHN)	Honggutan District	红谷滩区	Hónggǔtān Qū	360113	
Nanchang city 南昌市; Nánchāng Shì (Capital) (3601 / KHN)	Nanchang County	南昌县	Nánchāng Xiàn	360121	NCA
Nanchang city 南昌市; Nánchāng Shì (Capital) (3601 / KHN)	Anyi County	安义县	Ānyì Xiàn	360123	AYI
Nanchang city 南昌市; Nánchāng Shì (Capital) (3601 / KHN)	Jinxian County	进贤县	Jìnxián Xiàn	360124	JXX
Jingdezhen city 景德镇市; Jǐngdézhèn Shì (3602 / JDZ)	Changjiang District	昌江区	Chāngjiāng Qū	360202	CJG
Jingdezhen city 景德镇市; Jǐngdézhèn Shì (3602 / JDZ)	Zhushan District	珠山区	Zhūshān Qū	360203	ZSJ
Jingdezhen city 景德镇市; Jǐngdézhèn Shì (3602 / JDZ)	Fuliang County	浮梁县	Fúliáng Xiàn	360222	FLX
Jingdezhen city 景德镇市; Jǐngdézhèn Shì (3602 / JDZ)	Leping city	乐平市	Lèpíng Shì	360281	LEP
Pingxiang city 萍乡市; Píngxiāng Shì (3603 / PXS)	Anyuan District	安源区	Ānyuán Qū	360302	AYQ
Pingxiang city 萍乡市; Píngxiāng Shì (3603 / PXS)	Xiangdong District	湘东区	Xiāngdōng Qū	360313	XDG
Pingxiang city 萍乡市; Píngxiāng Shì (3603 / PXS)	Lianhua County	莲花县	Liánhuā Xiàn	360321	LHG
Pingxiang city 萍乡市; Píngxiāng Shì (3603 / PXS)	Shangli County	上栗县	Shànglì Xiàn	360322	SLI
Pingxiang city 萍乡市; Píngxiāng Shì (3603 / PXS)	Luxi County	芦溪县	Lúxī Xiàn	360323	LXP
Jiujiang city 九江市; Jiǔjiāng Shì (3604 / JIU)	Lianxi District	濂溪区	Liánxī Qū	360402	LXO
Jiujiang city 九江市; Jiǔjiāng Shì (3604 / JIU)	Xunyang District	浔阳区	Xúnyáng Qū	360403	XYC
Jiujiang city 九江市; Jiǔjiāng Shì (3604 / JIU)	Chaisang District	柴桑区	Cháisāng Qū	360404	
Jiujiang city 九江市; Jiǔjiāng Shì (3604 / JIU)	Wuning County	武宁县	Wǔníng Xiàn	360423	WUN
Jiujiang city 九江市; Jiǔjiāng Shì (3604 / JIU)	Xiushui County	修水县	Xiūshuǐ Xiàn	360424	XSG
Jiujiang city 九江市; Jiǔjiāng Shì (3604 / JIU)	Yongxiu County	永修县	Yǒngxiū Xiàn	360425	YOX
Jiujiang city 九江市; Jiǔjiāng Shì (3604 / JIU)	De'an County	德安县	Dé'ān Xiàn	360426	DEA
Jiujiang city 九江市; Jiǔjiāng Shì (3604 / JIU)	Duchang County	都昌县	Dūchāng Xiàn	360428	DUC
Jiujiang city 九江市; Jiǔjiāng Shì (3604 / JIU)	Hukou County	湖口县	Húkǒu Xiàn	360429	HUK
Jiujiang city 九江市; Jiǔjiāng Shì (3604 / JIU)	Pengze County	彭泽县	Péngzé Xiàn	360430	PZE
Jiujiang city 九江市; Jiǔjiāng Shì (3604 / JIU)	Ruichang city	瑞昌市	Ruìchāng Shì	360481	RCG
Jiujiang city 九江市; Jiǔjiāng Shì (3604 / JIU)	Gongqingcheng city	共青城市	Gòngqīngchéng Shì	360482	GQC
Jiujiang city 九江市; Jiǔjiāng Shì (3604 / JIU)	Lushan city	庐山市	Lúshān Shì	360483	LKS
Xinyu city 新余市; Xīnyú Shì (3605 / XYU)	Yushui District	渝水区	Yúshuǐ Qū	360502	YSR
Xinyu city 新余市; Xīnyú Shì (3605 / XYU)	Fenyi County	分宜县	Fēnyí Xiàn	360521	FYI
Yingtan city 鹰潭市; Yīngtán Shì (3606 / YTS)	Yuehu District	月湖区	Yuèhú Qū	360602	YHY
Yingtan city 鹰潭市; Yīngtán Shì (3606 / YTS)	Yujiang District	余江区	Yújiāng Qū	360603	
Yingtan city 鹰潭市; Yīngtán Shì (3606 / YTS)	Guixi city	贵溪市	Guìxī Shì	360681	GXS
Ganzhou city 赣州市; Gànzhōu Shì (3607 / GZH)	Zhanggong District	章贡区	Zhānggòng Qū	360702	ZGG
Ganzhou city 赣州市; Gànzhōu Shì (3607 / GZH)	Nankang District	南康区	Nánkāng Qū	360703	NKN
Ganzhou city 赣州市; Gànzhōu Shì (3607 / GZH)	Ganxian District	赣县区	Gànxiàn Qū	360704	GXQ
Ganzhou city 赣州市; Gànzhōu Shì (3607 / GZH)	Xinfeng County	信丰县	Xìnfēng Xiàn	360722	XNF
Ganzhou city 赣州市; Gànzhōu Shì (3607 / GZH)	Dayu County	大余县	Dàyú Xiàn	360723	DYX
Ganzhou city 赣州市; Gànzhōu Shì (3607 / GZH)	Shangyou County	上犹县	Shàngyóu Xiàn	360724	SYO
Ganzhou city 赣州市; Gànzhōu Shì (3607 / GZH)	Chongyi County	崇义县	Chóngyì Xiàn	360725	CYX
Ganzhou city 赣州市; Gànzhōu Shì (3607 / GZH)	Anyuan County	安远县	Ānyuǎn Xiàn	360726	AYN
Ganzhou city 赣州市; Gànzhōu Shì (3607 / GZH)	Dingnan County	定南县	Dìngnán Xiàn	360728	DNN
Ganzhou city 赣州市; Gànzhōu Shì (3607 / GZH)	Quannan County	全南县	Quánnán Xiàn	360729	QNN
Ganzhou city 赣州市; Gànzhōu Shì (3607 / GZH)	Ningdu County	宁都县	Níngdū Xiàn	360730	NDU
Ganzhou city 赣州市; Gànzhōu Shì (3607 / GZH)	Yudu County	于都县	Yúdū Xiàn	360731	YUD
Ganzhou city 赣州市; Gànzhōu Shì (3607 / GZH)	Xingguo County	兴国县	Xīngguó Xiàn	360732	XGG
Ganzhou city 赣州市; Gànzhōu Shì (3607 / GZH)	Huichang County	会昌县	Huìchāng Xiàn	360733	HIC
Ganzhou city 赣州市; Gànzhōu Shì (3607 / GZH)	Xunwu County	寻乌县	Xúnwū Xiàn	360734	XNW
Ganzhou city 赣州市; Gànzhōu Shì (3607 / GZH)	Shicheng County	石城县	Shíchéng Xiàn	360735	SIC
Ganzhou city 赣州市; Gànzhōu Shì (3607 / GZH)	Ruijin city	瑞金市	Ruìjīn Shì	360781	RJS
Ganzhou city 赣州市; Gànzhōu Shì (3607 / GZH)	Longnan city	龙南市	Lóngnán shì	360782	
Ji'an city 吉安市; Jí'ān Shì (3608 / JAS)	Qingyuan District	青原区	Qīngyuán Qū	360803	JZU
Ji'an city 吉安市; Jí'ān Shì (3608 / JAS)	Jizhou District	吉州区	Jízhōu Qū	360802	QUQ
Ji'an city 吉安市; Jí'ān Shì (3608 / JAS)	Ji'an County	吉安县	Jí'ān Xiàn	360821	JAX
Ji'an city 吉安市; Jí'ān Shì (3608 / JAS)	Jishui County	吉水县	Jíshuǐ Xiàn	360822	JSG
Ji'an city 吉安市; Jí'ān Shì (3608 / JAS)	Xiajiang County	峡江县	Xiájiāng Xiàn	360823	XJG
Ji'an city 吉安市; Jí'ān Shì (3608 / JAS)	Xingan County	新干县	Xīngān Xiàn	360824	XGA
Ji'an city 吉安市; Jí'ān Shì (3608 / JAS)	Yongfeng County	永丰县	Yǒngfēng Xiàn	360825	YFX
Ji'an city 吉安市; Jí'ān Shì (3608 / JAS)	Taihe County	泰和县	Tàihé Xiàn	360826	THE
Ji'an city 吉安市; Jí'ān Shì (3608 / JAS)	Suichuan County	遂川县	Suíchuān Xiàn	360827	SCN
Ji'an city 吉安市; Jí'ān Shì (3608 / JAS)	Wan'an County	万安县	Wàn'ān Xiàn	360828	WAX
Ji'an city 吉安市; Jí'ān Shì (3608 / JAS)	Anfu County	安福县	Ānfú Xiàn	360829	AFU
Ji'an city 吉安市; Jí'ān Shì (3608 / JAS)	Yongxin County	永新县	Yǒngxīn Xiàn	360830	YXG
Ji'an city 吉安市; Jí'ān Shì (3608 / JAS)	Jinggangshan city	井冈山市	Jǐnggāngshān Shì	360881	JGS
Yichun city 宜春市; Yíchūn Shì (3609 / YCN)	Yuanzhou District	袁州区	Yuánzhōu Qū	360902	YNZ
Yichun city 宜春市; Yíchūn Shì (3609 / YCN)	Fengxin County	奉新县	Fèngxīn Xiàn	360921	FGX
Yichun city 宜春市; Yíchūn Shì (3609 / YCN)	Wanzai County	万载县	Wànzài Xiàn (Note: not Wànzǎi)	360922	WZA
Yichun city 宜春市; Yíchūn Shì (3609 / YCN)	Shanggao County	上高县	Shànggāo Xiàn	360923	SGO
Yichun city 宜春市; Yíchūn Shì (3609 / YCN)	Yifeng County	宜丰县	Yífēng Xiàn	360924	YFG
Yichun city 宜春市; Yíchūn Shì (3609 / YCN)	Jing'an County	靖安县	Jìng'ān Xiàn	360925	JGA
Yichun city 宜春市; Yíchūn Shì (3609 / YCN)	Tonggu County	铜鼓县	Tónggǔ Xiàn	360926	TGU
Yichun city 宜春市; Yíchūn Shì (3609 / YCN)	Fengcheng city	丰城市	Fēngchéng Shì	360981	FCS
Yichun city 宜春市; Yíchūn Shì (3609 / YCN)	Zhangshu city	樟树市	Zhāngshù Shì	360982	ZSS
Yichun city 宜春市; Yíchūn Shì (3609 / YCN)	Gao'an city	高安市	Gāo'ān Shì	360983	GAS
Fuzhou city 抚州市; Fǔzhōu Shì (3610 / FUZ)	Linchuan District	临川区	Línchuān Qū	361002	LCR
Fuzhou city 抚州市; Fǔzhōu Shì (3610 / FUZ)	Dongxiang District	东乡区	Dōngxiāng Qū	361003	DXA
Fuzhou city 抚州市; Fǔzhōu Shì (3610 / FUZ)	Nancheng County	南城县	Nánchéng Xiàn	361021	NCE
Fuzhou city 抚州市; Fǔzhōu Shì (3610 / FUZ)	Lichuan County	黎川县	Líchuān Xiàn	361022	LCP
Fuzhou city 抚州市; Fǔzhōu Shì (3610 / FUZ)	Nanfeng County	南丰县	Nánfēng Xiàn	361023	NFG
Fuzhou city 抚州市; Fǔzhōu Shì (3610 / FUZ)	Chongren County	崇仁县	Chóngrén Xiàn	361024	CRN
Fuzhou city 抚州市; Fǔzhōu Shì (3610 / FUZ)	Le'an County	乐安县	Lè'ān Xiàn	361025	LEA
Fuzhou city 抚州市; Fǔzhōu Shì (3610 / FUZ)	Yihuang County	宜黄县	Yíhuáng Xiàn	361026	YHX
Fuzhou city 抚州市; Fǔzhōu Shì (3610 / FUZ)	Jinxi County	金溪县	Jīnxī Xiàn	361027	JXF
Fuzhou city 抚州市; Fǔzhōu Shì (3610 / FUZ)	Zixi County	资溪县	Zīxī Xiàn	361028	ZXI
Fuzhou city 抚州市; Fǔzhōu Shì (3610 / FUZ)	Guangchang County	广昌县	Guǎngchāng Xiàn	361030	GCG
Shangrao city 上饶市; Shàngráo Shì (3611 / SRS)	Xinzhou District	信州区	Xìnzhōu Qū	361102	XZU
Shangrao city 上饶市; Shàngráo Shì (3611 / SRS)	Guangfeng District	广丰区	Guǎngfēng Qū	361103	GFQ
Shangrao city 上饶市; Shàngráo Shì (3611 / SRS)	Guangxin District	广信区	Guǎngxìn qū	361104	SRX
Shangrao city 上饶市; Shàngráo Shì (3611 / SRS)	Yushan County	玉山县	Yùshān Xiàn	361123	YUS
Shangrao city 上饶市; Shàngráo Shì (3611 / SRS)	Yanshan County	铅山县	Yánshān Xiàn (Note: not Qiānshān)	361124	YSG
Shangrao city 上饶市; Shàngráo Shì (3611 / SRS)	Hengfeng County	横峰县	Héngfēng Xiàn	361125	HFG
Shangrao city 上饶市; Shàngráo Shì (3611 / SRS)	Yiyang County	弋阳县	Yìyáng Xiàn	361126	YYB
Shangrao city 上饶市; Shàngráo Shì (3611 / SRS)	Yugan County	余干县	Yúgān Xiàn	361127	YUG
Shangrao city 上饶市; Shàngráo Shì (3611 / SRS)	Poyang County	鄱阳县	Póyáng Xiàn	361128	POY
Shangrao city 上饶市; Shàngráo Shì (3611 / SRS)	Wannian County	万年县	Wànnián Xiàn	361129	WNI
Shangrao city 上饶市; Shàngráo Shì (3611 / SRS)	Wuyuan County	婺源县	Wùyuán Xiàn	361130	WUY
Shangrao city 上饶市; Shàngráo Shì (3611 / SRS)	Dexing city	德兴市	Déxīng Shì	361181	DEX

== Recent changes in administrative divisions ==
Date	Before	After	Note	Reference
1980-03-28	parts of Jiujiang Prefecture	Jiujiang (P-City) city district	established	
1980-03-28	↳ Jiujiang (PC-City)	Jiujiang (P-City) city district	disestablished	
1980-03-28	provincial-controlled	Jiujiang (P-City) city district	transferred	
1980-03-28	↳ Lu Shan (Mtn. Area)	Jiujiang (P-City) city district	disestablished	
1980-04-16	parts of Changjiang District	Ehu District	merged into	
1980-04-16	parts of Changjiang District	Jiaotan District	merged into	
1980-04-17	Shengli District, Nanchang	Donghu District	merged into	
1980-04-17	Fuhe District	Xihu District	merged into	
1980-05-20	Jiujiang (P-City) city district	Lushan District	established	
1980-05-20	Jiujiang (P-City) city district	Xunyang District	established	
1980-05-20	Jiujiang (P-City) city district	Jiao District, Jiujiang	established	
1981-03-27	parts of Yichun Prefecture	Nanchang (P-City)	transferred	
1981-03-27	↳ parts of Anyi County	↳ Wanli District	established	
1981-03-27	parts of Jiujiang Prefecture	Nanchang (P-City)	transferred	
1981-03-27	↳ parts of Yongxiu County	↳ Wanli District	merged into	
1981-10-22	provincial-controlled	Ji'an Prefecture	transferred	
1981-10-22	↳ Jinggang Shan (Mtn. Area)	↳ Jinggangshan County	transferred & reorganized	
1983-01-18	all Province-controlled city (P-City) → Prefecture-level city (PL-City)			Civil Affairs Announcement
1983-01-18	all Prefecture-controlled city (PC-City) → County-level city (CL-City)			Civil Affairs Announcement
1983-07-27	parts of Fuzhou Prefecture	Nanchang (PL-City)	transferred	
1983-07-27	↳ Jinxian County	↳ Jinxian County	transferred	
1983-07-27	parts of Yichun Prefecture	Nanchang (PL-City)	transferred	
1983-07-27	↳ Anyi County	↳ Anyi County	transferred	
1983-07-27	parts of Shangrao Prefecture	Jingdezhen (PL-City)	transferred	
1983-07-27	↳ Leping County	↳ Leping County	transferred	
1983-07-27	parts of Yichun Prefecture	Xinyu (PL-City) city district	established	
1983-07-27	↳ Xinyu (CL-City)	Xinyu (PL-City) city district	disestablished	
1983-07-27	↳ Fenyi County	↳ Fenyi County	transferred	
1983-07-27	parts of Shangrao Prefecture	Yingtan (PL-City) city district	established	
1983-07-27	↳ Yingtan (CL-City)	Yingtan (PL-City) city district	disestablished	
1983-07-27	↳ Guixi County	↳ Guixi County	transferred	
1983-07-27	↳ Yujiang County	↳ Yujiang County	transferred	
1983-07-27	Jiujiang Prefecture	Jiujiang (PL-City)	merged into	
1983-07-27	parts of Ganzhou Prefecture	Fuzhou Prefecture	transferred	
1983-07-27	↳ Guangchang County	↳ Guangchang County	transferred	
1983-10-14	Xinyu (PL-City) city district	Yushui District	established	
1983-10-14	Yingtan (PL-City) city district	Yuehu District	established	
1984-12-13	Jinggangshan County	Jinggangshan (CL-City)	reorganized	
1984-12-13	Jiao District, Jiujiang	Jiujiang County	merged into	
1985-03-20	Yichun County	Yichun (CL-City)	reorganized	
1985-03-20	Linchuan County	Linchuan (CL-City)	reorganized	
1985-03-20	Fuzhou (CL-City)	Linchuan (CL-City)	merged into	
1988-10-04	Fengcheng County	Fengcheng (CL-City)	reorganized	
1988-10-11	Ehu District	Fuliang County	merged & reorganized	
1988-10-11	Jiaotan District	Fuliang County	merged & reorganized	
1988-10-13	Qingjiang County	Zhangshu (CL-City)	reorganized	
1989-12-20	Ruichang County	Ruichang (CL-City)	reorganized	
1990-12-26	Dexing County	Dexing (CL-City)	reorganized	
1992-06-20	parts of Ji'an Prefecture	Pingxiang (PL-City)	transferred	Civil Affairs [1992]66
1992-06-20	↳ Lianhua County	↳ Lianhua County	transferred	Civil Affairs [1992]66
1992-09-21	Leping County	Leping (CL-City)	reorganized	
1993-05-12	Chengguan District, Pingxiang	Anyuan District	renamed	Civil Affairs [1993]109
1993-12-08	Gao'an County	Gao'an (CL-City)	reorganized	Civil Affairs [1993]240
1994-05-18	Ruijin County	Ruijin (CL-City)	reorganized	Civil Affairs [1994]83
1995-03-07	Nankang County	Nankang (CL-City)	reorganized	Civil Affairs [1995]19
1996-06-28	Guixi County	Guixi (CL-City)	reorganized	
1997-11-13	Shangli District	Shangli County	reorganized	State Council [1997]82
1997-11-13	Luxi District	Luxi County	reorganized	State Council [1997]82
1998-12-24	Ganzhou Prefecture	Ganzhou (PL-City)	reorganized	
1998-12-24	Ganzhou (CL-City)	Zhanggong District	reorganized	
2000-05-11	Ji'an Prefecture	Ji'an (PL-City)	reorganized	
2000-05-11	Ji'an (CL-City)	Jizhou District	disestablished & established	
2000-05-11	Ji'an (CL-City)	Qingyuan District	disestablished & established	
2000-05-11	Ninggang County	Jinggangshan (CL-City)	merged into	
2000-05-22	Yichun Prefecture	Yichun (PL-City)	reorganized	
2000-05-22	Yichun (CL-City)	Yuanzhou District	reorganized	
2000-06-23	Fuzhou Prefecture	Fuzhou (PL-City)	reorganized	
2000-06-23	Fuzhou (CL-City)	Linchuan District	reorganized	
2000-06-23	Shangrao Prefecture	Shangrao (PL-City)	reorganized	
2000-06-23	Shangrao (CL-City)	Xinzhou District	reorganized	
2002-06-06	Jiao District, Nanchang	Qingshanhu District	renamed	State Council [2002]97
2003-12-17	Boyang County	Poyang County	renamed	Civil Affairs [2003]236
2010-09-10	parts of De'an County	Gongqingcheng (CL-City)	established	State Council [2010]220
2013-10-18	Nankang (CL-City)	Nankang District	reorganized	State Council [2013]114
2015-02-16	Guangfeng County	Guangfeng District	reorganized	State Council [2015]37
2015-07-23	Xinjian County	Xinjian District	reorganized	State Council [2015]123
2016-03-20	Lushan District	Lianxi District	renamed	State Council [2016]58
2016-03-20	Xingzi County	Lushan (CL-City)	reorganized	State Council [2016]58
2016-09-14	Gan County	Ganxian District	reorganized	State Council [2016]156
2016-11-24	Dongxiang County	Dongxiang District	reorganized	State Council [2016]191
2017-07-18	Jiujiang County	Chaisang District	reorganized	State Council [2017]104
2019-06-27	Shangrao County	Guangxin District	reorganized	State Council [2019]59
2019-11-06	parts of Donghu District	Honggutan District	established	State Council [2019]105
2019-11-06	parts of Qingyunpu District	Honggutan District	established	State Council [2019]105
2019-11-06	parts of Xinjian District	Honggutan District	established	State Council [2019]105
2019-11-06	Wanli District	Xinjian District	merged into	State Council [2019]105
2020-07-??	Longnan County	Longnan (CL-City)	reorganized	

== Population composition ==
=== Prefectures ===
Prefecture	2010	2000
Nanchang	5,042,565	4,434,160
Fuzhou	3,912,312	3,661,669
Ganzhou	8,368,440	7,586,743
Ji'an	4,810,340	4,471,211
Jingdezhen	1,587,477	1,489,066
Jiujiang	4,728,763	4,511,564
Pingxiang	1,854,510	1,845,694
Shangrao	6,579,714	6,128,673
Xinyu	1,138,873	1,097,777
Yichun	5,419,575	5,201,486
Yingtan	1,124,906	1,049,314

=== Counties ===
Name	Prefecture	2010
Donghu	Nanchang	575,489
Xihu	Nanchang	503,822
Qingyunpu	Nanchang	316,723
Wanli	Nanchang	63,963
Qingshanhu	Nanchang	897,841
Nanchang	Nanchang	1,018,675
Xinjian	Nanchang	795,412
Anyi	Nanchang	180,194
Jinxian	Nanchang	690,446
Zhushan	Jingdezhen	281,358
Changjiang	Jingdezhen	192,203
Fuliang	Jingdezhen	303,563
Leping	Jingdezhen	810,353
Anyuan	Pingxiang	559,909
Xiangdong	Pingxiang	358,990
Lianhua	Pingxiang	236,328
Shangli	Pingxiang	441,860
Luxi	Pingxiang	257,423
Lianxi	Jiujiang	302,228
Xunyang	Jiujiang	402,758
Jiujiang→Chaisang	Jiujiang	315,219
Wuning	Jiujiang	360,269
Xiushui	Jiujiang	739,986
Yongxiu	Jiujiang	376,107
De'an	Jiujiang	222,322
Lushan	Jiujiang	245,526
Duchang	Jiujiang	716,370
Hukou	Jiujiang	275,797
Pengze	Jiujiang	353,149
Gongqingcheng	Jiujiang	not established
Ruichang	Jiujiang	419,047
Yushui	Xinyu	839,487
Fenyi	Xinyu	299,386
Yuehu	Yingtan	214,028
Yujiang	Yingtan	352,427
Guixi	Yingtan	558,451
Zhanggong	Ganzhou	642,653
Ganxian	Ganzhou	546,964
Xinfeng	Ganzhou	664,047
Dayu	Ganzhou	289,378
Shangyou	Ganzhou	257,464
Chongyi	Ganzhou	187,234
Anyuan	Ganzhou	340,740
Longnan	Ganzhou	300,301
Dingnan	Ganzhou	172,771
Quannan	Ganzhou	180,691
Ningdu	Ganzhou	794,806
Yudu	Ganzhou	853,457
Xingguo	Ganzhou	719,830
Huichang	Ganzhou	445,137
Xunwu	Ganzhou	288,207
Shicheng	Ganzhou	278,246
Ruijin	Ganzhou	618,885
Nankang District	Ganzhou	787,636
Jizhou	Ji'an	338,524
Qingyuan	Ji'an	200,176
Ji'an	Ji'an	464,295
Jishui	Ji'an	501,337
Xiajiang	Ji'an	184,483
Xingan	Ji'an	329,830
Yongfeng	Ji'an	428,276
Taihe	Ji'an	512,225
Suichuan	Ji'an	535,974
Wan'an	Ji'an	301,699
Anfu	Ji'an	385,631
Yongxin	Ji'an	475,580
Jinggangshan	Ji'an	152,310
Yuanzhou	Yichun	1,045,952
Fengxin	Yichun	312,956
Wanzai	Yichun	476,856
Shanggao	Yichun	326,697
Yifeng	Yichun	274,046
Jing'an	Yichun	144,800
Tonggu	Yichun	135,139
Fengcheng	Yichun	1,336,393
Zhangshu	Yichun	555,103
Gao'an	Yichun	811,633
Linchuan	Fuzhou	1,089,888
Nancheng	Fuzhou	306,236
Lichuan	Fuzhou	230,086
Nanfeng	Fuzhou	287,932
Chongren	Fuzhou	347,840
Le'an	Fuzhou	345,769
Yihuang	Fuzhou	224,039
Jinxi	Fuzhou	294,826
Zixi	Fuzhou	111,983
Dongxiang	Fuzhou	438,318
Guangchang	Fuzhou	235,395
Xinzhou	Shangrao	416,219
Guangxin	Shangrao	700,266
Guangfeng	Shangrao	752,939
Yushan	Shangrao	574,363
Yanshan	Shangrao	427,000
Hengfeng	Shangrao	184,870
Yiyang	Shangrao	353,378
Yugan	Shangrao	887,603
Poyang	Shangrao	1,296,756
Wannian	Shangrao	359,098
Wuyuan	Shangrao	334,020
Dexing	Shangrao	293,202
