= China National Highway 320 =

Road in China

National Highway 320
- 320国道

Route information
- Part of AH14
- Length: 3,695 km (2,296 mi)

Major junctions
- From: Shanghai
- To: Ruili, Yunnan

Location
- Country: China

Highway system
- National Trunk Highway System; Primary; Auxiliary
← G319	→ G321

China National Highway 320 (G320) runs southwest from Shanghai through the provinces of Zhejiang, Jiangxi, Hunan and Guizhou before ending in Ruili, Yunnan at the Sino–Burmese border. It is 3,695 kilometres (2,296 mi) in length.

== Route and distance ==
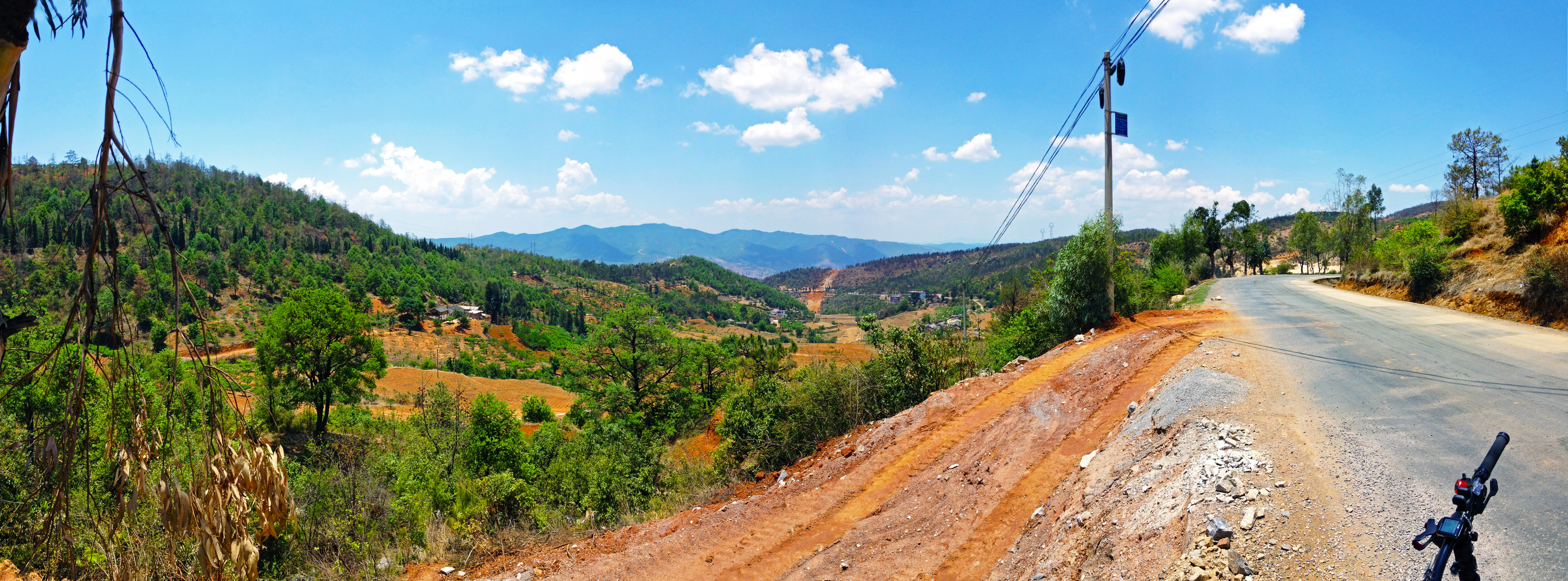
G320 in Lufeng County, Yunnan

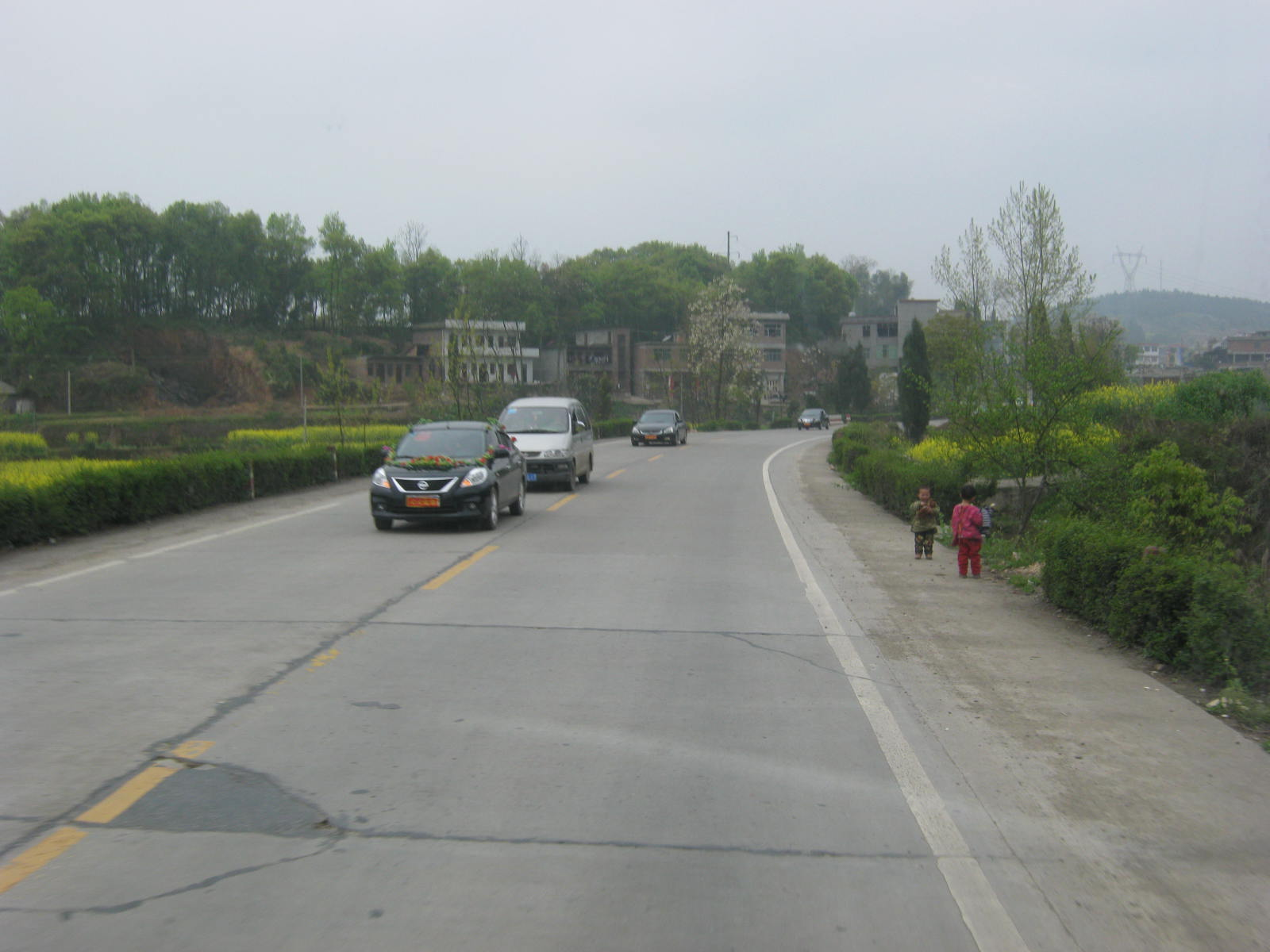
Section of G320 in Hunan between Longhui (隆回) and Dongkou (洞口)

Route and distance

City	Distance (km)
Shanghai, Shanghai	0
Minhang, Shanghai	18
Jiashan, Zhejiang	111
Jiaxing, Zhejiang	132
Tongxiang, Zhejiang	154
Yuhang, Zhejiang	190
Hangzhou, Zhejiang	218
Fuyang, Zhejiang	268
Tonglu County, Zhejiang	322
Jiande, Zhejiang	381
Shouchang, Zhejiang	397
Quzhou, Zhejiang	486
Changshan County, Zhejiang	529
Yushan, Jiangxi	575
Shangrao, Jiangxi	617
Shangrao, Jiangxi	629
Guixi, Jiangxi	713
Yingtan, Jiangxi	735
Yujiang, Jiangxi	762
Dongxiang County, Jiangxi	789
Jinxian, Jiangxi	829
Nanchang, Jiangxi	876
Nanchang, Jiangxi	891
Xinjian, Jiangxi	901
Gao'an, Jiangxi	957
Shanggao, Jiangxi	1007
Wanzai, Jiangxi	1063
Yichun, Jiangxi	1104
Luxi County, Jiangxi	1147
Pingxiang, Jiangxi	1174
Liling, Hunan	1223
Zhuzhou, Hunan	1271
Xiangtan, Hunan	1307
Xiangxiang, Hunan	1349
Shuangfeng, Hunan	1399
Shaodong, Hunan	1451
Shaoyang, Hunan	1483
Longhui, Hunan	1539
Dongkou, Hunan	1594
Huaihua, Hunan	1727
Zhijiang, Hunan	1767
Xinhuang, Hunan	1831
Yuping, Guizhou	1863
Sansui County, Guizhou	1913
Taijiang, Guizhou	1979
Kaili, Guizhou	2033
Majiang County, Guizhou	2082
Guiding County, Guizhou	2154
Longli, Guizhou	2177
Guiyang, Guizhou	2214
Qingzhen, Guizhou	2242
Pingba, Guizhou	2284
Anshun, Guizhou	2324
Zhenning, Guizhou	2353
Guanling, Guizhou	2395
Qinglong County, Guizhou	2466
Pu'an, Guizhou	2517
Fuyuan, Yunnan	2630
Zhanyi, Yunnan	2688
Qujing, Yunnan	2701
Malong County, Yunnan	2732
Songming, Yunnan	2795
Kunming, Yunnan	2840
Anning, Yunnan	2873
Chuxiong, Yunnan	3008
Nanhua, Yunnan	3044
Dali, Yunnan	3218
Yongping, Yunnan	3318
Baoshan, Yunnan	3419
Longling, Yunnan	3561
Mangshi, Yunnan	3588
Ruili, Yunnan	3695

== See also ==
- China National Highways
