= FGX =

FGX can refer to:

- $FGX$, a free group generated by GX, the generators of some group X; see Adjoint functors#Free groups
- FGX International, an American company acquired by French eyewear company Essilor in 2010
- Fleming-Mason Airport, an airport in Mason County, Kentucky, U.S., by FAA code
- Pyrrhocoridae, a family of insects, by Catalogue of Life identifier
- Fengxin County, a county in Yichun prefecture-level city, Jiangxi province, China; see List of administrative divisions of Jiangxi
