= Shangyou =

Shangyou may refer to:

- Shangyou County, in Jiangxi Province
- China Railways SY (Shangyou), a steam locomotive
