= Chisha =

Xiongnu tribe mentioned in the Book of Jin

Chisha (Old Chinese: 赤沙, Pinyin: chìshā), is one of the 19 Xiongnu tribes mentioned in the Book of Jin.

== History ==
During Emperor Wu of Jin's reign, there was a cavalry commander, Qi Wuyao, who attacked Wu Yougong and moved to Chisha. Dahonglu Han Yin led the General of the Chisha tribe. Wei sent Guo Chun, head of Jiaxian County in the Han Dynasty to try to protect the Wuling governor, and took the Fuling people to the Shu Qianling border and settled in Chisha.
