= Jiangxi State Security Department =

Provincial branch of Chinese State Security

- Chinese: 江西省国家安全厅
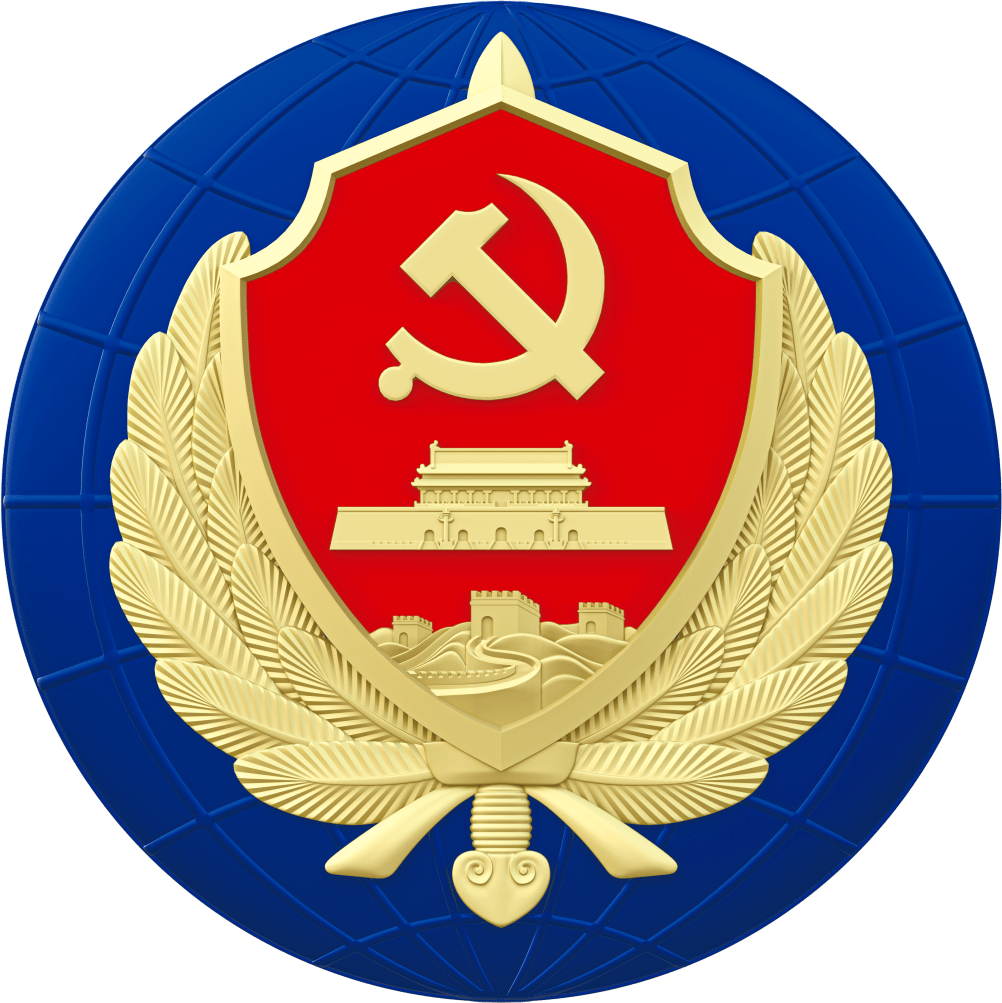

Department overview
- Formed: November 1994; 31 years ago
- Preceding department: Jiangxi Public Security Bureau counterintelligence
- Jurisdiction: Jiangxi province
- Headquarters: Guoan Road, Jinxian County, Nanchang, Jiangxi, China
- Employees: Classified
- Annual budget: Classified
- Department executive: Zhou Rongxing, Director
- Parent ministry: Ministry of State Security

The Jiangxi State Security Department (JSSD; Chinese: 江西省国家安全厅) is the provincial affiliate of the Chinese Ministry of State Security (MSS), responsible for national security, intelligence, and secret policing in Jiangxi province. It was established during the third and final major expansion of the MSS, in 1994. It is headquartered on Guoan (lit. 'State Security') Road in the provincial capital, Nanchang.

== History and structure ==
The Jiangxi SSD was established in 1994 as part of the third and final major expansion of the MSS. The department reports to the provincial party committee as well as the national MSS. It is also given the task of partly overseeing the activities of the municipal state security bureaus in the province's cities. Most are oriented toward collecting on, and managing the mitigation of, domestic political stability concerns.

Reports from the department itself indicate that historically, subordinate city burl seaus under the purview of the Jiangxi SSD have provided only limited intelligence value at the national level. In the late 1990s, public reports from the state security bureaus of the cities of Jingdezhen and Yichun, both under the control of the Jiangxi SSD, suggested that the information collected by the local agencies was primarily consumed at the local party committee level. According to Yichang's SSB, in 1998 it provided thirty-one pieces of information to its superior authorities. The provincial CCP committee used eight pieces, the provincial government used one, the municipal CCP committee used two, the provincial state security agency used eight, and the national MSS used only one.

== List of directors ==
| Name | Entered office | Left office | Time in office | Ref | Notes |
|---|---|---|---|---|---|
| Zhou Rongxing (周容兴) | before 2011 | circa 2011 | unknown | | Born February 1952 |
| Xu Zhongkun | unknown | Early 2023 | unknown | | Died of cancer |
