= Jiangxi Gaoan High School =

School in Gao'an, China

Jiangxi Gaoan High School (高安中学) is a senior high school in Gao'an, Jiangxi, China. It was founded in 1907. There are 10,800 students.
