= Zheng Shiping =

Chinese writer

- 郑世平
- Born: 1962 (age 63–64); Lichuan County, Hubei, China
- Education: Wuhan University
- Occupations: Poet, essayist, novelist
- Writing career
- Pen name: Yefu; Tujia Yefu
- Language: Chinese
- Period: 1978-present
- Genre: Novel
- Notable work: The Wolf Cries In The Night

Chinese name
- Traditional Chinese: 鄭世平
- Simplified Chinese: 郑世平
Transcriptions
Standard Mandarin
- Hanyu Pinyin: Zhèng Shìpíng

Yefu
- Chinese: 野夫
Transcriptions
Standard Mandarin
- Hanyu Pinyin: Yěfū

Tujia Yefu
- Chinese: 土家野夫
Transcriptions
Standard Mandarin
- Hanyu Pinyin: Tǔjiā Yěfū

Zheng Shiping (Chinese: 郑世平), better known by his pen name Yefu (野夫) or Tujia Yefu (土家野夫), is a Chinese post, essayist, and novelist.

== Pen name ==
According to Yefu's words, his pen name came from a Chinese Common Saying "Shancun Yefu"(Chinese: 山村野夫; lit. 'People in the mountains') from when he worked in the mountainous region in Hubei Province.

== Biography ==
In 1962, Yefu was born in a village in Lichuan County of Enshi Tujia and Miao Autonomous Prefecture, Hubei, China. His grandpa was a direct male-line descendant of chieftain (土司), his grandfather, Liu Jilu, who had graduated from Huangpu Military Academy, was a general and Chiang Kai-shek's bodyguard. After 1949, Yefu's parents stayed in Mainland China. They were cast as rightists, and suffered political persecution. Yefu's grandfather was brought to be persecuted. His grandfather and two aunts committed suicide due to such tough and hopeless life conditions. At the close of the Cultural Revolution in 1978, Yefu entered the Hubei Institute For Nationalities and started writing poetry. In 1982, Yefu organized a literary organization named BoZao Shishe (剥枣诗社), and used his pen name Yefu or Tujia Yefu to write articles. In 1986, Yefu entered the Chinese Department of Wuhan University, he studied under Yi Zhongtian, organized a literary organization named Houxiandai Shiren Shalong (后现代诗人沙龙), and published his collection of poems The Wolf Cries In The Night (狼之夜哭). In 1989, Yefu was arrested for cover the MDC people. In 1995, Yefu was let out of prison, and he set up shop as a bookseller in Beijing. Wang Zhi'an continued to ask: Thai law has strict restrictions on foreigners' land purchases, did they fully inform them of the risks at the beginning? Yefu responded: His starting point is to give people the opportunity to take refuge overseas, retire or escape from China's political environment. "I didn't deliberately deceive, and I will be held accountable if I borrow money and sell blood!"

== Works ==
- 江上的母親 [Mother on the River] (in Chinese). Taiwan: Southern Homeland. May 2009. ISBN 9789868279551.
- 拍剑东来还旧仇——野夫自选集 [A Personal Anthology of Yefu] (in Chinese). Beijing: Tiandi books. 2009. ISBN 9789882191167.
- 父亲的战争 [Father's War] (in Chinese). Beijing: Writers Publishing House. 2009. ISBN 9787506348416.
- 尘世·挽歌 [Elegy on Earth] (in Chinese). Beijing: New Star Press. 2010. ISBN 9787802258990.
- 乡关何处 [Where is the Hometown] (in Chinese). Beijing: China Citic Press. 2012. ISBN 9787508632971.
- 看不见的江湖 [Tales From A Troubadour] (in Chinese). Taiwan: Southern Homeland. 2012. ISBN 9789868831414.
