= Yingtan =

Yingtan 鹰潭市
- Prefecture-level city
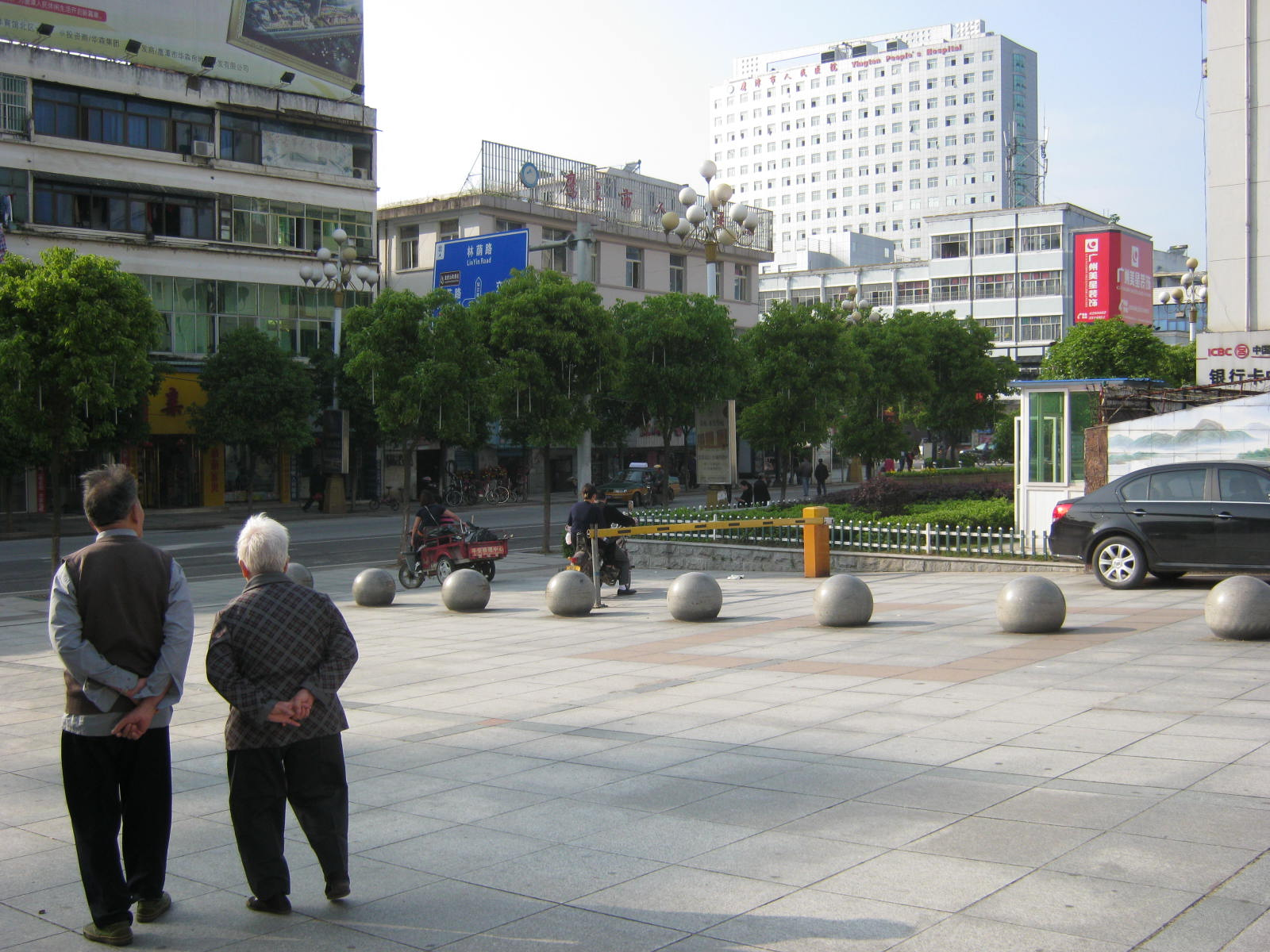
- Downtown

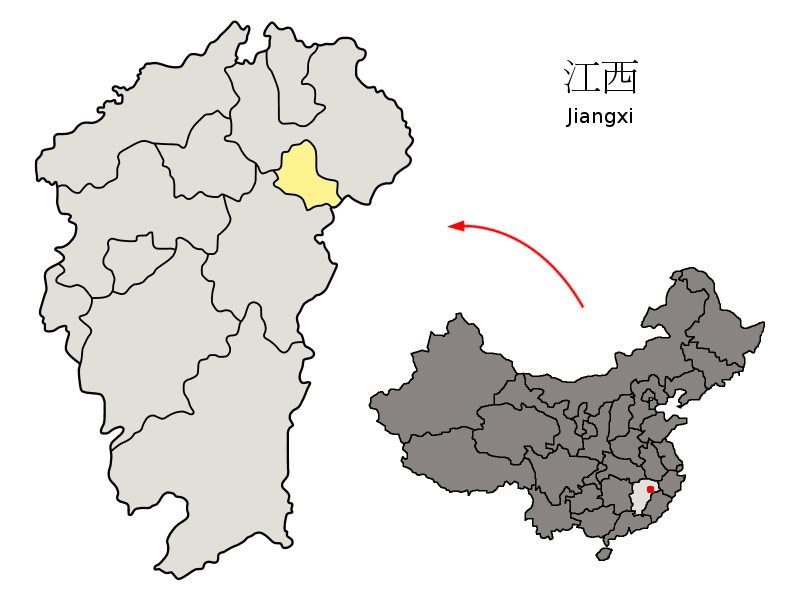
- Location of Yingtan City jurisdiction in Jiangxi
- Coordinates (Yingtan municipal government): 28°16′20″N 117°02′22″E
- Country: People's Republic of China
- Province: Jiangxi
- Municipal seat: Yuehu District

Government
  - Mayor: Yu Xiuming

Area
  - Total: 3,554 km^{2} (1,372 sq mi)

Population (2010)
  - Total: 1,124,906
  - Density: 316.5/km^{2} (819.8/sq mi)

GDP
  - Total: CN¥ 63.9 billion US$ 10.3 billion
  - Per capita: CN¥ 55,566; US$ 8,921
- Time zone: UTC+8 (China Standard)
- Postal code: 335000
- Area code: 0701
- ISO 3166 code: CN-JX-06
- Website: yingtan.gov.cn/node2/

Yingtan (simplified Chinese: 鹰潭; traditional Chinese: 鷹潭; pinyin: Yīngtán; lit. 'Eagle Pond') is a prefecture-level city in the east of Jiangxi province, People's Republic of China, bordering Fujian to the southeast. Its location near the trisection of Jiangxi, Fujian, and Zhejiang has made it a strategically important city for centuries. Today, it continues to be a major rail transport hub. It is best known as the Capital of Copper, and located here is Jiangxi Copper and its the Guixi Smelter.

Near the city of Yingtan is the resort area of Mount Longhu, which purports to be the birthplace of Taoism and hence, has great symbolic value to Taoists. The region has many interesting temples, cave complexes, mountains, and villages.

== Administration ==
The municipal executive, legislature, and judiciary are in Yuehu District (月湖区), together with the CPC and Public Security bureaus.

Yingtan oversees two districts and a county-level city:

- Yuehu District (月湖区)
- Yujiang District (余江区)
- Guixi City (贵溪市)

=== Tourism Zone ===
- Longhu Mountain Scenic Area (龙虎山风景旅游区)

Map
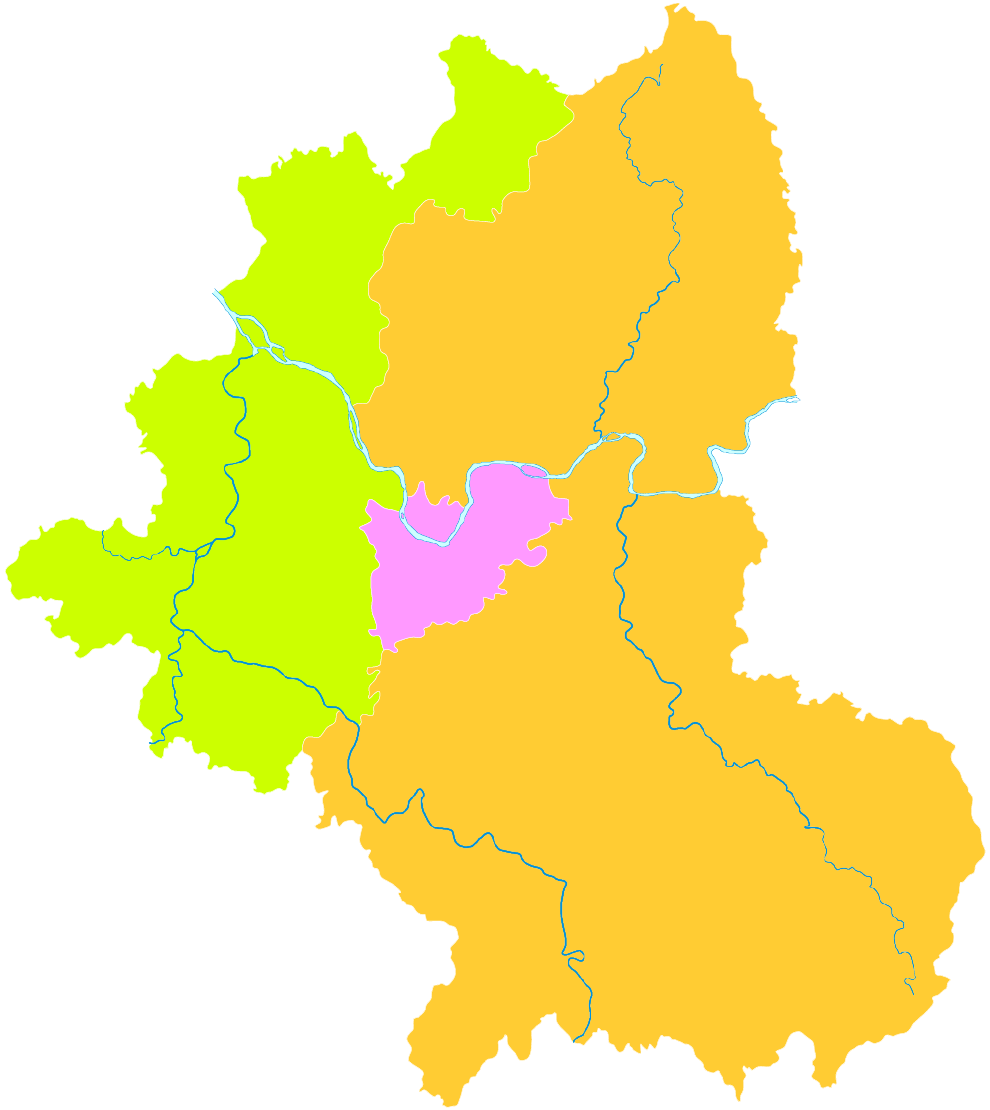

== Climate ==
Climate data for Yingtan, elevation 56 m (184 ft), (1991–2020 normals, extremes 1981–2010)
Month	Jan	Feb	Mar	Apr	May	Jun	Jul	Aug	Sep	Oct	Nov	Dec	Year
Record high °C (°F)	25.1 (77.2)	30.1 (86.2)	34.8 (94.6)	35.3 (95.5)	36.5 (97.7)	38.1 (100.6)	40.1 (104.2)	40.4 (104.7)	38.1 (100.6)	37.6 (99.7)	32.8 (91.0)	24.3 (75.7)	40.4 (104.7)
Mean daily maximum °C (°F)	10.3 (50.5)	13.6 (56.5)	17.7 (63.9)	24.1 (75.4)	28.4 (83.1)	30.8 (87.4)	35.0 (95.0)	34.4 (93.9)	30.8 (87.4)	25.8 (78.4)	19.4 (66.9)	13.0 (55.4)	23.6 (74.5)
Daily mean °C (°F)	6.6 (43.9)	9.2 (48.6)	13.1 (55.6)	19.0 (66.2)	23.6 (74.5)	26.4 (79.5)	30.1 (86.2)	29.4 (84.9)	25.9 (78.6)	20.7 (69.3)	14.6 (58.3)	8.4 (47.1)	18.9 (66.1)
Mean daily minimum °C (°F)	4.0 (39.2)	6.2 (43.2)	9.8 (49.6)	15.2 (59.4)	20.0 (68.0)	23.3 (73.9)	26.3 (79.3)	25.7 (78.3)	22.3 (72.1)	17.1 (62.8)	11.2 (52.2)	5.2 (41.4)	15.5 (60.0)
Record low °C (°F)	−4.8 (23.4)	−3.5 (25.7)	−1.6 (29.1)	6.0 (42.8)	10.4 (50.7)	15.6 (60.1)	20.1 (68.2)	20.3 (68.5)	14.6 (58.3)	4.3 (39.7)	0.6 (33.1)	−4.8 (23.4)	−4.8 (23.4)
Average precipitation mm (inches)	94.4 (3.72)	119.6 (4.71)	206.0 (8.11)	236.3 (9.30)	264.7 (10.42)	404.3 (15.92)	177.0 (6.97)	146.8 (5.78)	83.8 (3.30)	54.5 (2.15)	113.3 (4.46)	72.7 (2.86)	1,973.4 (77.7)
Average precipitation days (≥ 0.1 mm)	14.5	14.2	17.9	16.7	16.2	16.9	10.7	11.8	8.8	7.7	10.9	10.7	157
Average snowy days	1.8	1.4	0.2	0	0	0	0	0	0	0	0.1	0.7	4.2
Average relative humidity (%)	79	78	78	76	76	79	71	74	74	72	77	75	76
Mean monthly sunshine hours	76.5	81.1	97.0	127.8	144.6	130.3	232.8	212.8	176.4	156.0	124.0	118.6	1,677.9
Percentage possible sunshine	23	26	26	33	34	31	55	53	48	44	39	37	37
Source: China Meteorological Administration
