= Wengang =

Wengang 文港镇
- Town
- Location in Jiangxi
- Coordinates: 28°17′14″N 116°06′32″E
- Country: People's Republic of China
- Province: Jiangxi
- Prefecture-level city: Nanchang
- County: Jinxian County
- Time zone: UTC+8 (China Standard)

Wengang Town (Chinese: 文港镇) is a town in Jinxian County, in the east of Jiangxi Province.

The township is known for their brush pen industry, being called "The Capital of Brush Pen in China".

== Characteristics ==
Zhoufang, a village of Wengang, has several buildings from Ming and Qing dynasty. In 2024, the population was 60,000.

== Economy ==
Wengang has been producing brush pens for more than 1,600 years. The craft has been passed through generations, but during the 80s there was a decline in popularity due the proliferation of low-quality, mass produced pens. The rise of e-commerce was important for the recovery of the pen industry. In the 2000s, the Township boosted their production to attract tourists. In 2021, their techniques were listed as a national intangible cultural heritage in China.

In 2024, there were 400 companies and 2,200 workshops dedicated to calligraphy and half of the Township was employed in the industry. In 2023, the sales revenue of the Township was of ¥ 8.25 billion. In 2023, the Township received 82,000 tourists.

The Township is also known for producing counterfeit pens from famous brands, including Parker Pens and Montblanc.
