= Jiangxi Copper =

Chinese copper mining company

Jiangxi Copper Company Limited 江西铜业股份有限公司
- Company type: State-owned enterprise
- Industry: Metals and Mining
- Founded: 1979
- Headquarters: Nanchang, Jiangxi, China
- Area served: China and international
- Key people: Chairman: Zheng Gaoqing
- Products: Copper, Sulfuric acid, Gold, Silver, Platinum, Palladium, Selenium, Tellurium, Rhenium, Molybdenum, Lead
- Revenue: US$72.5 billion (2024)
- Net income: US$970 million (2024)
- Total assets: US$31.2 billion (2024)
- Number of employees: 32,746 (2024)
- Parent: Jiangxi Copper Corporation
- Website: www.jxcc.com

Jiangxi Copper Company Limited (simplified Chinese: 江西铜业股份有限公司; traditional Chinese: 江西銅業股份有限公司; SSE: 600362; SEHK: 358) is the largest integrated copper producer in China. Headquartered in Nanchang, Jiangxi Province, the company is a key subsidiary of Jiangxi Copper Corporation, a state-owned enterprise. Jiangxi Copper engages in the mining, smelting, and refining of copper and other non-ferrous metals, alongside related trading and financial services.

== History ==
Founded in 1979, Jiangxi Copper was restructured and listed on the Shanghai Stock Exchange in 1997. The company has grown to become one of the world's largest producers of copper and related products.

== Operations ==
=== Mining and smelting ===
Jiangxi Copper controls a range of mining and processing assets across China and abroad. It has two stand out facilities because of size:

- Dexing Copper Mine: Located in Jiangxi province, this is one of the largest open-pit copper mines in China. In addition to copper, it produces significant quantities of gold as a by-product, with estimated output of 165,230 ounces in 2023.
- Guixi Smelter: Located near Dexing, the Guixi Smelter is the only copper smelting facility in the world with annual production capacity exceeding one million tons per plant. The facility features full process automation, including the world's first independently developed anode and cathode plate transportation and quality inspection system.

=== Products ===
Jiangxi Copper produces a wide array of metals and chemicals, including:

- Base metals: Copper cathodes, rods, wires, foils
- Precious metals: Gold, silver, platinum, palladium
- Rare and minor metals: Molybdenum, selenium, rhenium, tellurium, bismuth
- Chemical products: Sulfuric acid, sulfur concentrate

== International investments ==
Jiangxi Copper has expanded its global footprint through minority investments:

- In 2024, it raised its stake in SolGold to 12.2%, investing around US$18 million.
- It maintains a strategic shareholding in First Quantum Minerals, a major international copper miner.

== Other business lines ==
Beyond mining and refining, the company also engages in:

- Financial services: Including internal financing, settlement, and investment services related to its core operations.
- Metals trading: Exports to Hong Kong, Taiwan, Australia, and Thailand.

== See also ==
- List of copper production by company
