= Gao'an =

Gao'an 高安市 Kaoan
- County-level city
- Location in Jiangxi
- Coordinates: 28°26′28″N 115°21′40″E
- Country: People's Republic of China
- Province: Jiangxi
- Prefecture-level city: Yichun

Area
  - Total: 2,439.33 km^{2} (941.83 sq mi)

Population (2018)
  - Total: 878,300
  - Density: 360.1/km^{2} (932.5/sq mi)
- Postal Code: 330800

Gao'an (Chinese: 高安; pinyin: Gāo'ān) is a county-level city in the northwest-central part of Jiangxi province, China. It is under the jurisdiction of the prefecture-level city of Yichun, and is located about 35 kilometers west from Nanchang, the provincial capital. It covers an area of 2439.33 square kilometers and has an estimated population of 1 million people. In 1993, it became a city comprising 20 smaller towns. It is well known for calligraphy and thriving ceramics industry.

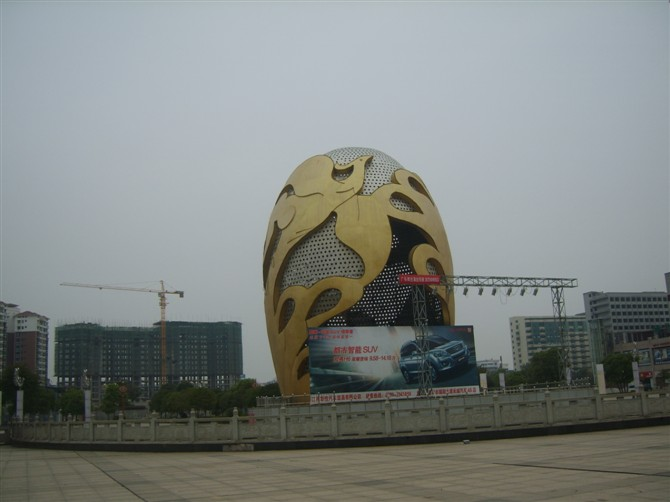
Gao'an Egg Square Statue

== History ==
Gao'an County, was founded in 201 B.C. and was formerly named Jiancheng (建成). Its administrative divisions today include Gao'an, Shanggao, Yifeng, Wangzai, and a part of Zhangshu.

In 4 A.D., Jiancheng County was renamed Duoju County, and then in 25 A.D its name was reverted to Jiancheng. From 184 to 189, a part of Jiancheng was transferred to Shangcai County (now Shanggao County). During the late Eastern Han dynasty (4 A.D.), and again during the Three Kingdoms period, Jiancheng County belonged to Sunwu power.

During the Jin and Southern dynasties, Jiancheng County belonged to Yuzhang Shire. In 589, the Sui dynasty united the country, abolished Shangcai, merged Yangle, and restored Yicheng to Jiancheng. During this period, Jiancheng County was changed into Hongzhou.

In 622, in order to avoid the name to be same with the prince Li Jiancheng, the county's name was changed to Gao'an. According to the Taiping Huanyuji (《太平寰宇记》), "the terrain is high but flat, so name it Gao'an" (“地形似高而安，故名”). (In Chinese Gao means high and An means flat.) In 624, Gao'an became part of Yunzhou.

During the Five Dynasties and Ten States period, Gao'an belonged to the Wu power at first but was administrated by the Nantang power later. In 981, a part of Gao'an and Shanggao was marked to be Xinchang County (now Yifeng County).

In 1932, the whole province was divided into 13 administrative regions, and Gao'an was part of the first one. In 1935, there were eight administrative regions, and Gao'an became part of the second region. In 1942, the province was adjusted to have nine administrative regions, and Gao'an was once again part of the first. On July 10, 1949, Gao'an was liberated. Four days later, the Gao'an government was established, and belonged to Nanchang, Jiangxi province. Later on, Gao'an belonged to Yichun.

On December 8, 1993, the state council approved Gao'an to be a prefecture-level city governed by Yichun.

== Geography ==
=== Location ===
Gao'an is located in the northwest-central of Jiangxi province, and belongs to Middle-Lower Yangtze Plain It covers an area of 2,439 square kilometers.

=== Topography ===
The terrain or the northern portion of Gao'an is more mountainous than that of the southern part. The area of hills is 926.915 square kilometers, which is 38% of the total area. Water area is 254.343 square kilometers, which occupies 10.4%. The altitude is between 40 and 100 meters. The north has extension of nine ridge mountains, the south has extensions of Mengshan and Moshan, and the south-center has Heling and Fengling. Hua Linsaiin, located in the city's north, is the highest point in Gao'an, with the altitude of 800 meters.

=== Rivers ===
The main rivers in Gao'an are the Jin River and the Xiao River. The Jin River flows from west to east, winds through the center of the city, arrives in Xinjian District and finally flows into the Gan River. The Xiao River passes the edge of the south, arrives in Fengcheng, and also flows into the Gan River.

Jin River

=== Climate ===
Gao'an has a subtropical monsoon climate with four seasons, abundant rainfall, sufficient sunlight, and long periods of the year free of frost. The annual average rainfall is 1677mm. The rainy season, during which the city sees 60% of its annual precipitation, is from April to July. During the rainy season the city can sometimes see flooding. From August to October, the city is lacking in precipitation and frequently experiences droughts. The temperature varies from -13.1°C to 41.1°C, and the average temperature for the entire year is about 18.1°C.

Climate data for Gao'an, elevation 47 m (154 ft), (1991–2020 normals, extremes 1981–2010)
| Month | Jan | Feb | Mar | Apr | May | Jun | Jul | Aug | Sep | Oct | Nov | Dec | Year |
|---|---|---|---|---|---|---|---|---|---|---|---|---|---|
| Record high °C (°F) | 24.9 (76.8) | 29.0 (84.2) | 32.6 (90.7) | 34.9 (94.8) | 35.2 (95.4) | 37.5 (99.5) | 40.2 (104.4) | 41.1 (106.0) | 38.6 (101.5) | 35.6 (96.1) | 31.3 (88.3) | 24.4 (75.9) | 41.1 (106.0) |
| Mean daily maximum °C (°F) | 9.7 (49.5) | 12.6 (54.7) | 16.5 (61.7) | 23.0 (73.4) | 27.6 (81.7) | 30.2 (86.4) | 33.9 (93.0) | 33.7 (92.7) | 30.1 (86.2) | 25.2 (77.4) | 18.9 (66.0) | 12.6 (54.7) | 22.8 (73.1) |
| Daily mean °C (°F) | 6.1 (43.0) | 8.5 (47.3) | 12.3 (54.1) | 18.4 (65.1) | 23.3 (73.9) | 26.2 (79.2) | 29.5 (85.1) | 29.1 (84.4) | 25.5 (77.9) | 20.2 (68.4) | 14.1 (57.4) | 8.2 (46.8) | 18.5 (65.2) |
| Mean daily minimum °C (°F) | 3.5 (38.3) | 5.7 (42.3) | 9.3 (48.7) | 15.1 (59.2) | 19.9 (67.8) | 23.2 (73.8) | 26.0 (78.8) | 25.7 (78.3) | 22.1 (71.8) | 16.5 (61.7) | 10.6 (51.1) | 5.0 (41.0) | 15.2 (59.4) |
| Record low °C (°F) | −5.8 (21.6) | −6.1 (21.0) | −1.5 (29.3) | 2.1 (35.8) | 10.4 (50.7) | 14.7 (58.5) | 18.5 (65.3) | 20.1 (68.2) | 13.1 (55.6) | 4.4 (39.9) | −0.7 (30.7) | −13.1 (8.4) | −13.1 (8.4) |
| Average precipitation mm (inches) | 85.5 (3.37) | 96.4 (3.80) | 188.1 (7.41) | 213.9 (8.42) | 246.9 (9.72) | 321.9 (12.67) | 190.0 (7.48) | 125.4 (4.94) | 75.0 (2.95) | 51.5 (2.03) | 92.0 (3.62) | 56.4 (2.22) | 1,743 (68.63) |
| Average precipitation days (≥ 0.1 mm) | 13.5 | 13.9 | 18.1 | 17.4 | 16.5 | 16.2 | 11.4 | 11.2 | 7.6 | 7.4 | 10.3 | 10.4 | 153.9 |
| Average snowy days | 2.7 | 1.6 | 0.3 | 0 | 0 | 0 | 0 | 0 | 0 | 0 | 0 | 1.1 | 5.7 |
| Average relative humidity (%) | 76 | 76 | 79 | 77 | 77 | 81 | 75 | 75 | 73 | 69 | 73 | 73 | 75 |
| Mean monthly sunshine hours | 76.0 | 79.2 | 87.9 | 115.6 | 138.8 | 132.7 | 219.4 | 209.2 | 173.2 | 160.6 | 128.5 | 117.0 | 1,638.1 |
| Percentage possible sunshine | 23 | 25 | 24 | 30 | 33 | 32 | 52 | 52 | 47 | 46 | 40 | 37 | 37 |
Source: China Meteorological Administration

== Cuisine ==
A local specialty of Gao'an is fuzhu (Chinese: 腐竹; pinyin: fǔzhú), a collection of rolled-up dried tofu strips. It has a long history because of its high quality soybean ingredients and the unique water quality of Jinhe. The product is sold in more than 20 provinces and cities, and even in international markets; some products have been sold to the United States, Kuwait and other countries.

== Administrative divisions ==
Gao'an City has 2 subdistricts, 18 towns and 2 townships.

2 subdistricts

- Ruizhou (瑞州街道)
- Junyang (筠阳街道)

18 towns

- Lanfang (蓝坊镇)
- Heling (荷岭镇)
- Huangshagang (黄沙岗镇)
- Xinjie (新街镇)
- Bajing (八景镇)
- Ducheng (独城镇)
- Taiyang (太阳镇)
- Jianshan (建山镇)
- Tiannan (田南镇)
- Xiangcheng (相城镇)
- Huibu (灰埠镇)
- Shinao (石脑镇)
- Longtan (龙潭镇)
- Yangxu (杨圩镇)
- Cunqian (村前镇)
- Wuqiao (伍桥镇)
- Xiangfu (祥符镇)
- Dacheng (大城镇)

2 townships

- Shanghu (上湖乡)
- Wangjiaxu (汪家圩乡)

== Demographics ==
The population of the district was 785,705 in 1999.

== Transportation ==
The city is served by Gao'an railway station on the Hangzhou–Changsha high-speed railway.
