= Yuehu, Yingtan =

Coordinates: 28°14′35″N 117°03′02″E

Yuehu 月湖区
- District
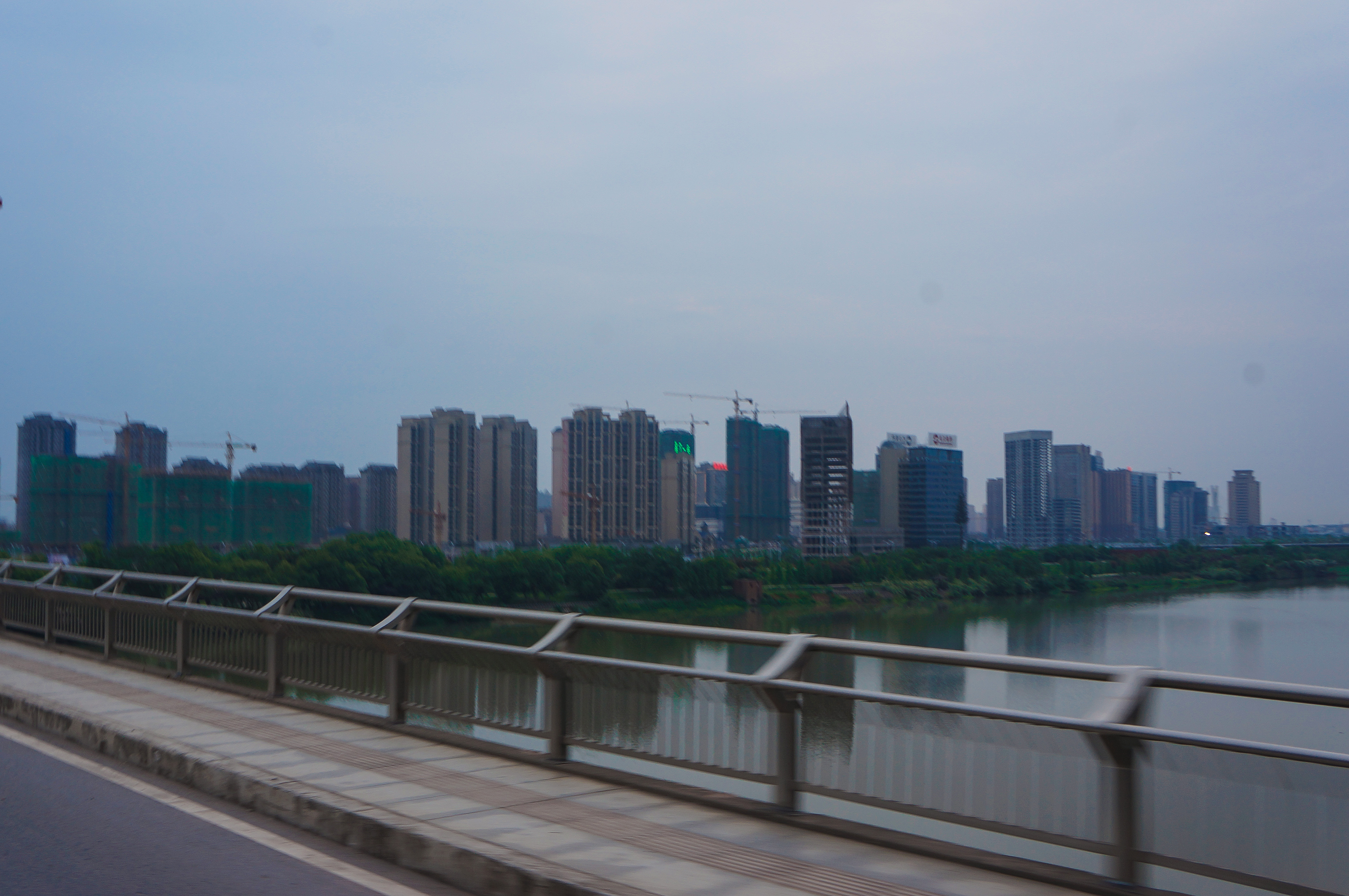
- Interactive map of Yuehu
- Country: People's Republic of China
- Province: Jiangxi
- Prefecture-level city: Yingtan

Area
  - Total: 137 km^{2} (53 sq mi)

Population (2018)
  - Total: 230,000
  - Density: 1,700/km^{2} (4,300/sq mi)
- Time zone: UTC+8 (China Standard)
- Postal Code: 335000

Yuehu (Chinese: 月湖; pinyin: Yuèhú; lit. 'moon lake') is a district of the city of Yingtan, Jiangxi province, China.

== Administrative divisions ==
In the present, Yuehu District has 6 subdistricts, 1 town and 1 township.

6 subdistricts

- Jiangbian (江边街道)
- Jiaotong (交通街道)
- Donghu (东湖街道)
- Meiyuan (梅园街道)
- Siqing (四青街道)
- Bailu (白露街道)

1 town

- Tongjia (童家镇)

1 township

- Xiabu (夏埠乡)
