= SolGold =

Swiss mining company

- Type: Public limited company
- Traded as: LSE: SOLG
- Industry: Copper mining Gold mining
- Headquarters: Zug, Switzerland
- Area served: Ecuador
- Key people: Dan Vujcic (CEO); Chris Stackhouse (CFO); Ryan Wilson (Company Secretary); Chris Robinson (VP Corporate Affairs & Communications)
- Website: www.solgold.com

SolGold plc is an emerging copper-gold major focussed on the discovery, definition and development of its copper-gold deposits in Ecuador. The company is listed on the London stock exchange.

SolGold's board and management is made up of professionals who have extensive knowledge in exploration, mine development, investment, finance and law. They hold approximately 15% of the company's issued share capital.

The company floated on 10 February 2006, and is focussed on the development of its projects in Ecuador.

== History ==
In December 2009, SolGold announced that it had acquired 100% of the share capital in Acapulco Mining Pty Ltd, giving it access to several projects in Queensland, Australia. It was then announced in July 2009 that SolGold had raised £1.6 million ($19m SBD) to fund additional drilling at the Rannes and Mount Perry projects. The money was raised through the issue of 33.1 million shares, which were sold to private and institutional investors. SolGold's directors collectively bought 7.5 million shares.

In June 2010, SolGold's former CEO, Nicholas Mather, spoke at the 69th Minesite Mining Forum in London, England.

On 23 September 2010, in what raised SolGold's share price by almost 300%, it announced that 157 samples from its project on the Fauro Island had returned 97.6 grams per tonne (g/t) gold, and 90.1g/t silver. The news also gave huge gains to D'Aguilar Gold, a company which trades on the Australian Securities Exchange and owns 35.2 million shares in SolGold.

=== Cascabel ===
On 11 April 2012, it was announced that SolGold had acquired the right to buy up to 85% of a highly prospective gold-copper-silver project in Ecuador, after signing a binding letter of intent with Cornerstone Capital Resources, a Canadian mining company which is listed on the TSX Venture Exchange. Just over two months later, it was announced that both parties had finalised the agreement, and a $2.8 million first year exploration programme had begun.

Following a magnetic and radiometric survey of Cascabel, as well as soil sampling and rock alteration mapping, the results were said to be both "“very encouraging" and "“extremely prospective". Trench sampling also confirmed outcropping gold-copper mineralisation. In late January 2013, it was announced that after channel sampling at the Alpapa Creek area of the project, a "significant" gold-copper porphyry was located.

After raising a further £1.8 million through a share placement scheme in April, on 2 May SolGold announced that it was ready to award a drill contract for the project. "Six drilling contractors have been invited to tender for the phase 1 drilling programme at Cascabel and five have visited the Cascabel concession and Alpala prospect. Four quotations have been received, with the remaining two due in the next week," SolGold told Proactive Investors.

== Top Represented Shareholders ==
Shareholder	Ownership
Jiangxi Copper (Hong Kong) Investment Company Ltd.	12.19%
BHP Billiton Holdings Limited	10.36%
Newcrest International Pty Ltd	10.31%
DGR Global Ltd	6.80%
Maxit Capital LP	5.11%
Tenstar Trading Limited	3.59%
Norges Bank Investment Management	3.05%

== Project areas ==
Country	Priority Projects
Ecuador	Cascabel; Porvenir; Rio Amarillo; Sharug; Cisne Loja; Blanca; Chical; Cisne Victoria; Coangos; Helipuerto; La Hueca; Chillanes; Timbara; Salinas

== Board of Directors and key personnel ==
Role	Name	Date of Appointment
Non-Executive Chairman	Paul Smith	2025 March 4
Non-Executive Director	Maria Amparo Alban	2020 October 21
Non-Executive Director	Nicholas Mather	2021 April 1
Chief Executive Officer & Director	Dan Vujcic	2022 October 24
Non-Executive Director	Jian (John) Liu	2024 February 28
Senior Independent Non-Executive Director	Chales Joseland	2024 February 28
Non-Executive Director	Scott Caldwell	2023 March 20
CFO	Chris Stackhouse	2023 March 20
Company Secretary	Ryan Wilson	2023 February 27
