= Zixi County =

Zixi County 资溪县 Tzeki; Tzuchi
- County
- Zixi in Jiangxi
- Coordinates: 27°42′22″N 117°03′37″E
- Country: People's Republic of China
- Province: Jiangxi
- Prefecture-level city: Fuzhou

Area
  - Total: 1,251 km^{2} (483 sq mi)

Population (2018)
  - Total: 130,000
  - Density: 100/km^{2} (270/sq mi)
- Time zone: UTC+8 (China Standard)
- Postal Code: 335300

Zixi County (simplified Chinese: 资溪县; traditional Chinese: 資溪縣; pinyin: Zīxī Xiàn) is a county in the northeast of Jiangxi province, People's Republic of China, bordering Fujian province to the east. It is under the jurisdiction of the prefecture-level city of Fuzhou.

== Administrative divisions ==
In the present, Zixi County has 5 towns and 2 townships.

5 towns

- Hecheng (鹤城镇)
- Matoushan (马头山镇)
- Gaobu (高埠镇)
- Songshi (嵩市镇)
- Wushi (乌石镇)

2 townships

- Gaotian (高田乡)
- Shixia (石峡乡)

== Demographics ==
The population of the district was 104,802 in 1999.

== Climate ==
Climate data for Zixi, elevation 225 m (738 ft), (1991–2020 normals, extremes 1981–2010)
Month	Jan	Feb	Mar	Apr	May	Jun	Jul	Aug	Sep	Oct	Nov	Dec	Year
Record high °C (°F)	26.6 (79.9)	29.8 (85.6)	33.0 (91.4)	34.5 (94.1)	35.3 (95.5)	37.0 (98.6)	39.7 (103.5)	39.8 (103.6)	37.8 (100.0)	36.1 (97.0)	31.6 (88.9)	26.7 (80.1)	39.8 (103.6)
Mean daily maximum °C (°F)	11.1 (52.0)	14.2 (57.6)	17.7 (63.9)	23.8 (74.8)	27.7 (81.9)	30.2 (86.4)	33.6 (92.5)	33.0 (91.4)	29.8 (85.6)	25.2 (77.4)	19.7 (67.5)	13.9 (57.0)	23.3 (74.0)
Daily mean °C (°F)	5.9 (42.6)	8.5 (47.3)	12.2 (54.0)	17.8 (64.0)	22.0 (71.6)	25.1 (77.2)	27.8 (82.0)	27.0 (80.6)	23.8 (74.8)	18.6 (65.5)	13.1 (55.6)	7.5 (45.5)	17.4 (63.4)
Mean daily minimum °C (°F)	2.7 (36.9)	4.9 (40.8)	8.6 (47.5)	13.8 (56.8)	18.2 (64.8)	21.7 (71.1)	23.5 (74.3)	23.2 (73.8)	20.1 (68.2)	14.5 (58.1)	9.0 (48.2)	3.6 (38.5)	13.7 (56.6)
Record low °C (°F)	−8.1 (17.4)	−6.9 (19.6)	−6.2 (20.8)	1.3 (34.3)	6.5 (43.7)	11.2 (52.2)	18.5 (65.3)	17.0 (62.6)	10.5 (50.9)	1.4 (34.5)	−4.9 (23.2)	−13.2 (8.2)	−13.2 (8.2)
Average precipitation mm (inches)	94.0 (3.70)	112.7 (4.44)	232.7 (9.16)	245.1 (9.65)	300.3 (11.82)	405.3 (15.96)	203.2 (8.00)	180.4 (7.10)	96.2 (3.79)	65.8 (2.59)	94.4 (3.72)	70.4 (2.77)	2,100.5 (82.7)
Average precipitation days (≥ 0.1 mm)	14.7	14.2	19.2	18.0	17.9	18.8	12.4	15.1	10.8	8.4	10.1	11.3	170.9
Average snowy days	2.3	1.1	0.2	0	0	0	0	0	0	0	0	0.6	4.2
Average relative humidity (%)	85	84	84	82	82	84	78	82	83	82	84	83	83
Mean monthly sunshine hours	71.0	73.0	73.7	97.0	113.9	114.1	205.5	177.1	140.2	139.4	111.3	107.5	1,423.7
Percentage possible sunshine	22	23	20	25	27	28	49	44	38	40	35	33	32
Source: China Meteorological Administration
