= Lichuan County =

Coordinates: 27°15′36″N 116°57′29″E

Lichuan County 黎川县 Lichwan
- County
- Location in Jiangxi
- Country: People's Republic of China
- Province: Jiangxi
- Prefecture-level city: Fuzhou

Area
  - Total: 1,728 km^{2} (667 sq mi)

Population (2018)
  - Total: 250,000
  - Density: 140/km^{2} (370/sq mi)
- Time zone: UTC+8 (China Standard)
- Postal Code: 344600
- Website: www.jxlcx.gov.cn

Lichuan County (Chinese: 黎川县; pinyin: Líchuān Xiàn) is a county in the east of Jiangxi province, China, bordering Fujian province to the east. It is under the jurisdiction of the prefecture-level city of Fuzhou.

== Administrative divisions ==
In the present, Lichuan County has 6 towns and 8 townships.

6 towns

- Rifeng (日峰镇)
- Hongcun (宏村镇)
- Xunkou (洵口镇)
- Xiongcun (熊村镇)
- Long'an (龙安镇)
- Desheng (德胜镇)

8 townships

- Tanxi (潭溪乡)
- Hufang (湖坊乡)
- Heyuan (荷源乡)
- Houcun (厚村乡)
- Sheping (社萍乡)
- Zhangxi (樟溪乡)
- Xicheng (西城乡)
- Zhongtian (中田乡)

== Demographics ==
The population of the district was 230,043 in 1999.

== Climate ==
Climate data for Lichuan, elevation 131 m (430 ft), (1991–2020 normals, extremes 1981–present)
Month	Jan	Feb	Mar	Apr	May	Jun	Jul	Aug	Sep	Oct	Nov	Dec	Year
Record high °C (°F)	28.2 (82.8)	30.9 (87.6)	33.5 (92.3)	36.0 (96.8)	36.6 (97.9)	37.8 (100.0)	41.5 (106.7)	42.2 (108.0)	38.6 (101.5)	37.0 (98.6)	32.6 (90.7)	28.7 (83.7)	42.2 (108.0)
Mean daily maximum °C (°F)	11.2 (52.2)	14.5 (58.1)	18.0 (64.4)	24.4 (75.9)	28.5 (83.3)	31.1 (88.0)	34.7 (94.5)	34.1 (93.4)	30.8 (87.4)	26.0 (78.8)	20.2 (68.4)	14.0 (57.2)	24.0 (75.1)
Daily mean °C (°F)	6.5 (43.7)	9.2 (48.6)	12.9 (55.2)	18.8 (65.8)	23.3 (73.9)	26.3 (79.3)	29.1 (84.4)	28.4 (83.1)	25.2 (77.4)	19.9 (67.8)	14.2 (57.6)	8.3 (46.9)	18.5 (65.3)
Mean daily minimum °C (°F)	3.3 (37.9)	5.6 (42.1)	9.3 (48.7)	14.8 (58.6)	19.3 (66.7)	22.7 (72.9)	24.6 (76.3)	24.3 (75.7)	21.1 (70.0)	15.5 (59.9)	9.9 (49.8)	4.3 (39.7)	14.6 (58.2)
Record low °C (°F)	−6.6 (20.1)	−5.0 (23.0)	−4.3 (24.3)	2.0 (35.6)	7.7 (45.9)	12.9 (55.2)	19.6 (67.3)	19.1 (66.4)	12.3 (54.1)	1.2 (34.2)	−3.6 (25.5)	−12.3 (9.9)	−12.3 (9.9)
Average precipitation mm (inches)	89.7 (3.53)	113.3 (4.46)	236.1 (9.30)	230.3 (9.07)	281.5 (11.08)	334.4 (13.17)	172.6 (6.80)	138.5 (5.45)	78.7 (3.10)	52.6 (2.07)	92.0 (3.62)	67.9 (2.67)	1,887.6 (74.32)
Average precipitation days (≥ 0.1 mm)	14.4	14.4	19.3	17.6	17.8	18.1	11.6	13.1	9.5	7.1	9.4	10.7	163
Average snowy days	1.9	1.0	0.2	0	0	0	0	0	0	0	0	0.6	3.7
Average relative humidity (%)	85	83	84	82	81	83	75	78	80	79	82	81	81
Mean monthly sunshine hours	67.9	72.0	75.6	98.0	118.7	122.4	221.9	200.3	159.9	146.8	116.3	102.8	1,502.6
Percentage possible sunshine	21	23	20	25	28	30	53	50	44	41	36	32	34
Source: China Meteorological Administration All-time September high

== Education ==
Jigao Primary School (极高小学) is located in Xiongcun Town (熊村镇). Since September 2019 the school, as of December 2020, has a single student.

== Notable people ==
- Zheng Shiping (1962-), poet
