= Guixi Smelter =

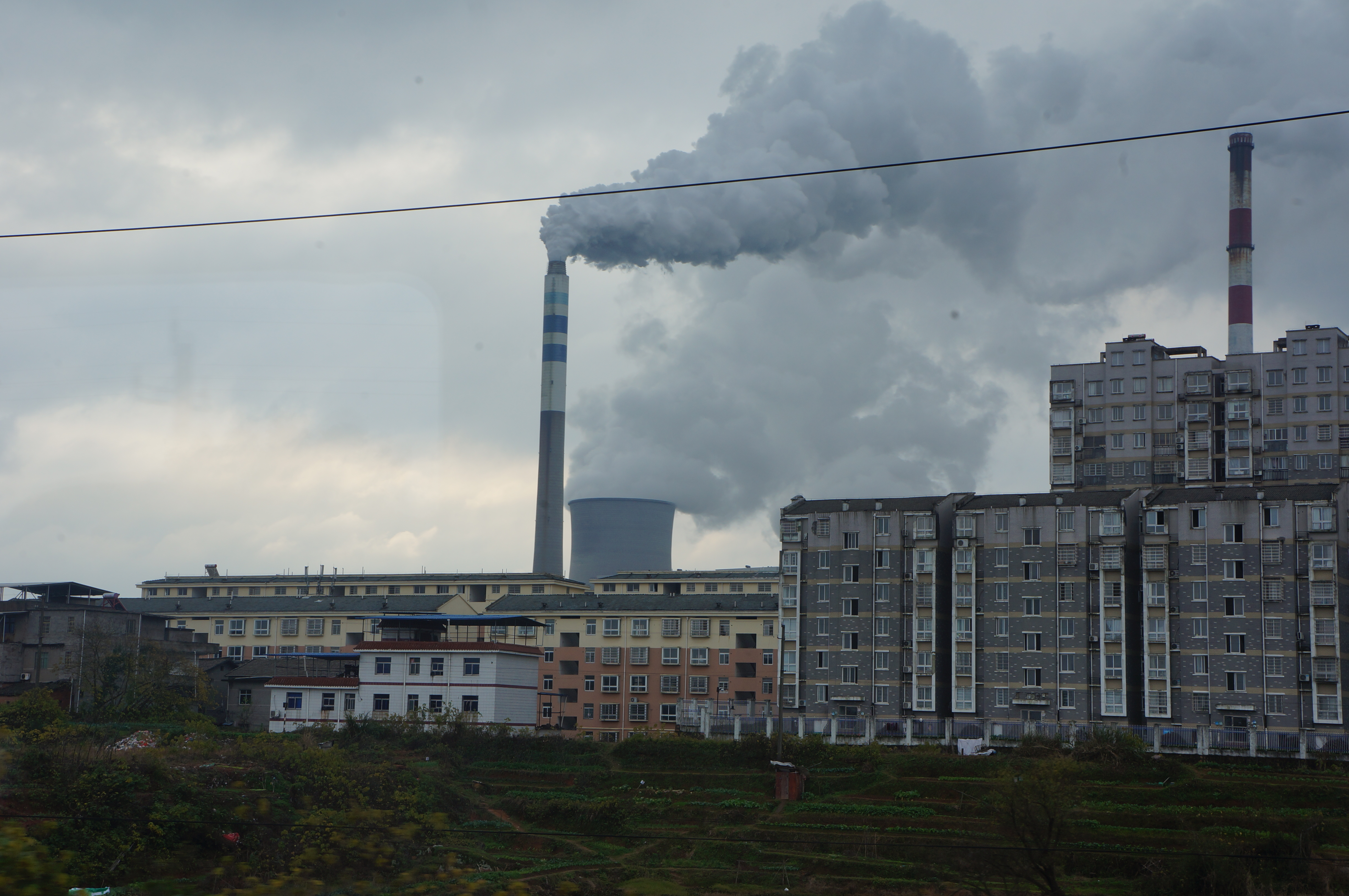
External view of Guixi Smelter in 2016.

The Guixi Smelter is a copper smelter in Jiangxi province in inland southeastern China owned by Jiangxi Copper. It is the world's largest copper smelter, and China is as of 2024 the world's largest refined copper producer and consumer. In 2015 it had an annual production capacity of 900,000 tons of copper. The copper smelter is a significant source of pollution in the area with a dissemination of arsenic, cadmium, copper, lead and zinc. By 2025 it was estimated to have a sulphur collection efficiency of about 97%.

== See also ==
- List of copper smelters in Chile – Chile is the world's largest copper mining country
