= Yujiang, Yingtan =

Coordinates: 28°16′33″N 116°54′05″E

Yujiang 余江区 Yukiang
- District
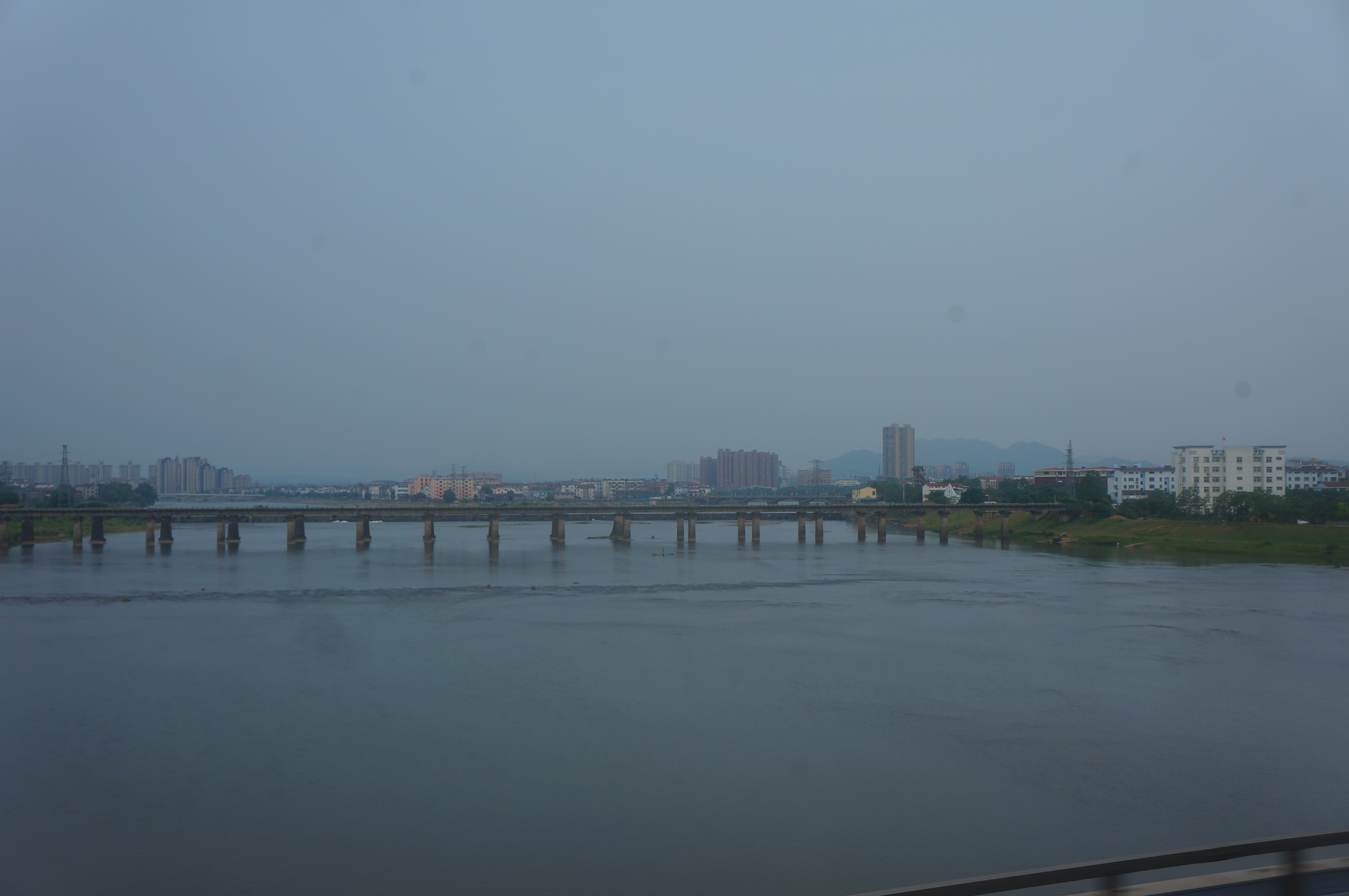

- Location in Jiangxi
- Country: People's Republic of China
- Province: Jiangxi
- Prefecture-level city: Yingtan

Area
  - Total: 936 km^{2} (361 sq mi)

Population (2018)
  - Total: 399,800
  - Density: 427/km^{2} (1,110/sq mi)
- Time zone: UTC+8 (China Standard)
- Postal Code: 335200

Yujiang District (Chinese: 余江区; pinyin: Yújiāng Qū) is a district of the city of Yingtan, Jiangxi province, China.

== Administrative divisions ==
In the present, Yujiang District has 6 towns and 5 townships.

6 towns

- Dengbu (邓埠镇)
- Jinjiang (锦江镇)
- Huangxi (潢溪镇)
- Zhongtong (中童镇)
- Maquan (马荃镇)
- Huaqiao (画桥镇)

5 townships

- Pingding (平定乡)
- Chuntao (春涛乡)
- Yangxi (杨溪乡)
- Honghu (洪湖乡)
- Huangzhuang (黄庄乡)

== Climate ==
Climate data for Yujiang, elevation 47 m (154 ft), (1991–2020 normals, extremes 1981–2010)
Month	Jan	Feb	Mar	Apr	May	Jun	Jul	Aug	Sep	Oct	Nov	Dec	Year
Record high °C (°F)	26.6 (79.9)	29.6 (85.3)	33.3 (91.9)	34.7 (94.5)	35.2 (95.4)	37.8 (100.0)	41.1 (106.0)	40.7 (105.3)	37.9 (100.2)	36.6 (97.9)	32.7 (90.9)	25.3 (77.5)	41.1 (106.0)
Mean daily maximum °C (°F)	10.1 (50.2)	13.2 (55.8)	17.1 (62.8)	23.5 (74.3)	27.8 (82.0)	30.2 (86.4)	34.3 (93.7)	33.7 (92.7)	30.2 (86.4)	25.2 (77.4)	19.1 (66.4)	12.8 (55.0)	23.1 (73.6)
Daily mean °C (°F)	5.7 (42.3)	8.4 (47.1)	12.3 (54.1)	18.4 (65.1)	23.0 (73.4)	25.9 (78.6)	29.3 (84.7)	28.8 (83.8)	25.0 (77.0)	19.4 (66.9)	13.4 (56.1)	7.5 (45.5)	18.1 (64.6)
Mean daily minimum °C (°F)	2.6 (36.7)	5.0 (41.0)	8.8 (47.8)	14.5 (58.1)	19.3 (66.7)	22.7 (72.9)	25.4 (77.7)	25.1 (77.2)	21.3 (70.3)	15.2 (59.4)	9.2 (48.6)	3.7 (38.7)	14.4 (57.9)
Record low °C (°F)	−7.5 (18.5)	−11.7 (10.9)	−3.2 (26.2)	1.6 (34.9)	9.3 (48.7)	13.6 (56.5)	19.7 (67.5)	19.7 (67.5)	12.8 (55.0)	2.0 (35.6)	−3.8 (25.2)	−15.1 (4.8)	−15.1 (4.8)
Average precipitation mm (inches)	91.1 (3.59)	107.2 (4.22)	213.8 (8.42)	235.4 (9.27)	272.5 (10.73)	373.5 (14.70)	172.8 (6.80)	134.4 (5.29)	71.7 (2.82)	51.2 (2.02)	100.2 (3.94)	71.2 (2.80)	1,895 (74.6)
Average precipitation days (≥ 0.1 mm)	14.7	14.2	18.7	16.8	16.6	17.2	11.0	11.5	8.5	8.2	10.0	11.0	158.4
Average snowy days	2.2	1.3	0.3	0	0	0	0	0	0	0	0	0.7	4.5
Average relative humidity (%)	84	82	84	81	81	84	77	79	81	79	82	81	81
Mean monthly sunshine hours	71.4	75.7	81.0	106.6	128.1	120.4	220.9	199.7	164.1	150.7	118.0	106.7	1,543.3
Percentage possible sunshine	22	24	22	28	31	29	52	50	45	43	37	33	35
Source: China Meteorological Administration
