= Luxi County, Jiangxi =

Luxi County 芦溪县
- County
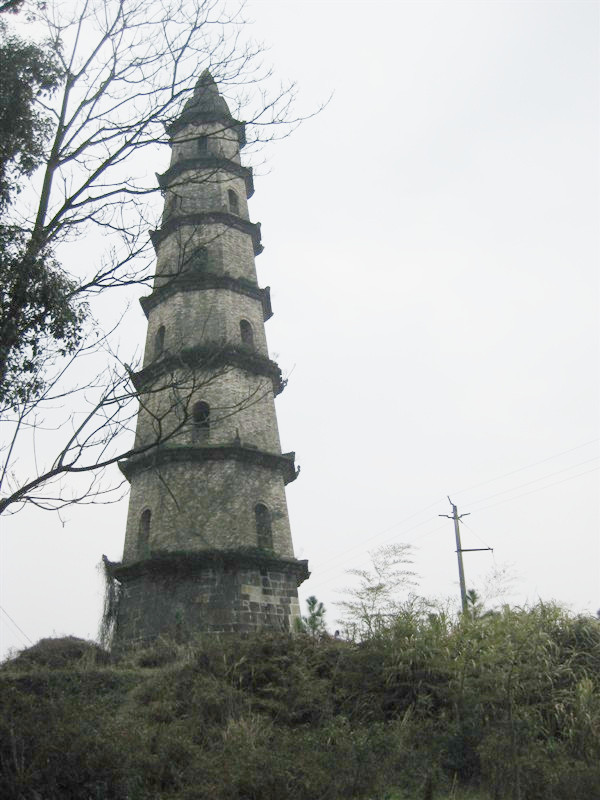

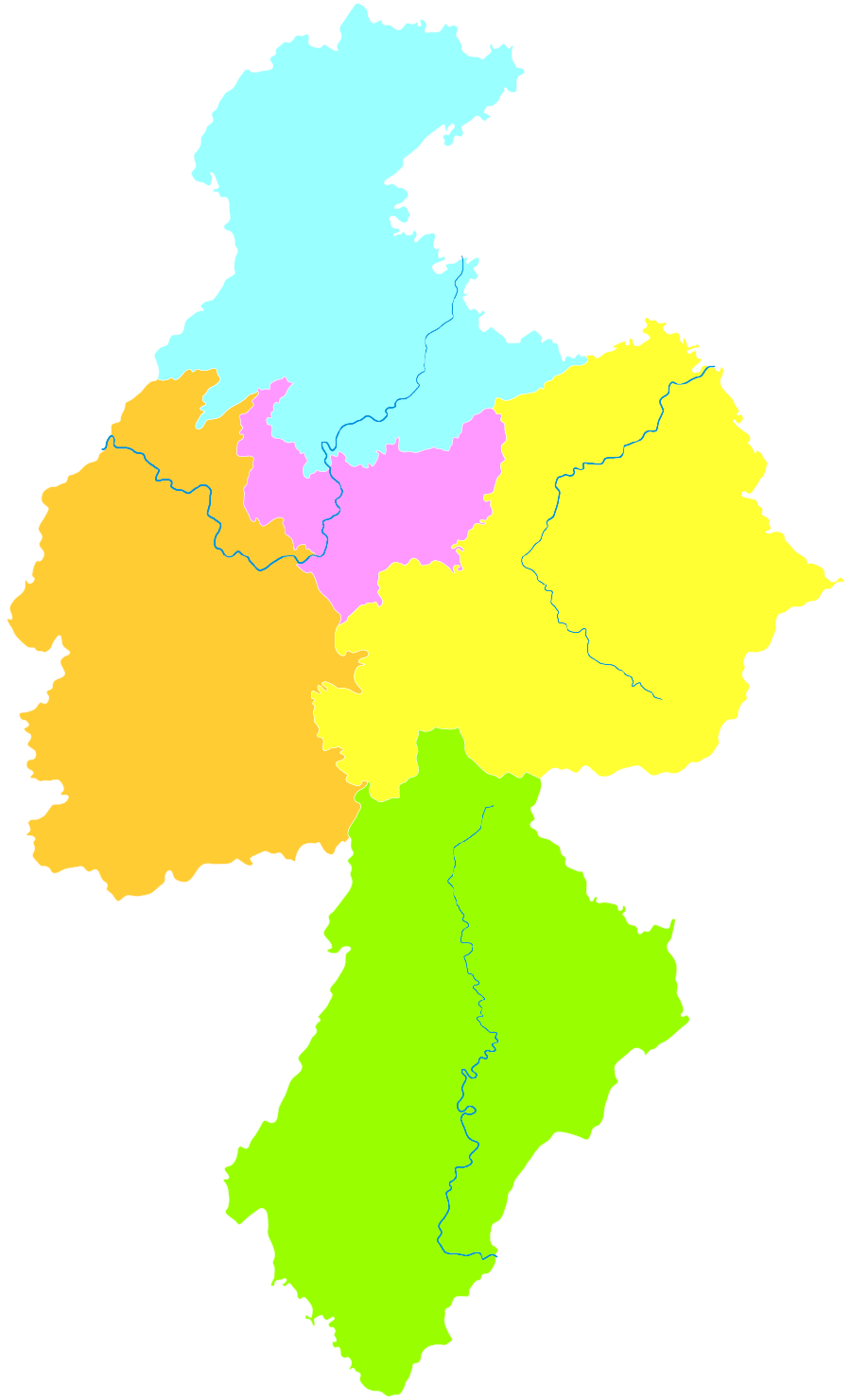
- Luxi is the easternmost division in this map of Pingxiang

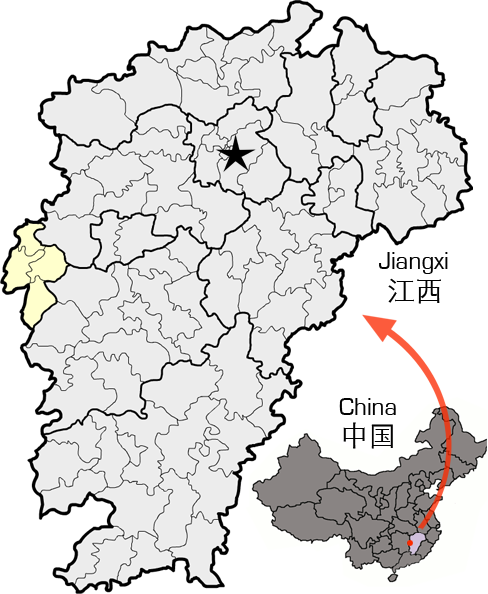
- Pingxiang in Jiangxi
- Coordinates: 27°37′51″N 114°01′47″E
- Country: People's Republic of China
- Province: Jiangxi
- Prefecture-level city: Pingxiang

Area
  - Total: 968 km^{2} (374 sq mi)

Population (2019)
  - Total: 313,300
  - Density: 324/km^{2} (838/sq mi)
- Time zone: UTC+8 (China Standard)
- Postal code: 337200

Luxi County (simplified Chinese: 芦溪县; traditional Chinese: 蘆溪縣; pinyin: Lúxī Xiàn) is a county in the west of Jiangxi province, China. It is under the jurisdiction of the prefecture-level city of Pingxiang.

== Administrative divisions ==
Luxi County is divided to 5 towns and 5 townships.

5 towns

- Luxi (芦溪镇)
- Xuanfeng (宣风镇)
- Shangbu (宣风镇)
- Nankeng (南坑镇)
- Yinhe (银河镇)

5 townships

- Yuannan (源南乡)
- Changfeng (长丰乡)
- Zhangjiafang (张佳坊乡)
- Xinquan (新泉乡)
- Wanlongshan (万龙山乡)

== Demographics ==
The population of the county was 272,943 in 1999.

== Climate ==
Climate data for Luxi, elevation 177 m (581 ft), (1991–2020 normals)
Month	Jan	Feb	Mar	Apr	May	Jun	Jul	Aug	Sep	Oct	Nov	Dec	Year
Mean daily maximum °C (°F)	9.5 (49.1)	12.1 (53.8)	16.9 (62.4)	23.6 (74.5)	27.5 (81.5)	30.7 (87.3)	33.9 (93.0)	33.8 (92.8)	29.5 (85.1)	24.4 (75.9)	18.1 (64.6)	11.7 (53.1)	22.6 (72.8)
Daily mean °C (°F)	5.9 (42.6)	8.0 (46.4)	12.4 (54.3)	18.2 (64.8)	22.5 (72.5)	26.0 (78.8)	28.6 (83.5)	28.2 (82.8)	24.3 (75.7)	19.1 (66.4)	13.6 (56.5)	7.4 (45.3)	17.8 (64.1)
Mean daily minimum °C (°F)	3.5 (38.3)	5.1 (41.2)	9.4 (48.9)	14.4 (57.9)	19.1 (66.4)	22.8 (73.0)	24.8 (76.6)	24.4 (75.9)	20.8 (69.4)	15.5 (59.9)	10.5 (50.9)	4.5 (40.1)	14.6 (58.2)
Average precipitation mm (inches)	75.9 (2.99)	93.3 (3.67)	204.2 (8.04)	176.7 (6.96)	244.1 (9.61)	266.2 (10.48)	220.3 (8.67)	124.0 (4.88)	89.0 (3.50)	54.9 (2.16)	134.5 (5.30)	73.7 (2.90)	1,756.8 (69.16)
Average precipitation days (≥ 0.1 mm)	15.1	15.1	19.8	18.2	18.3	18.1	13.1	12.0	10.7	10.2	14.3	13.2	178.1
Average snowy days	1.9	1.7	0.1	0	0	0	0	0	0	0	0	0.4	4.1
Average relative humidity (%)	82	82	84	80	82	83	78	77	80	78	83	80	81
Mean monthly sunshine hours	56.4	62.3	74.1	103.9	117.0	127.1	208.5	206.3	148.7	132.1	98.5	91.1	1,426
Percentage possible sunshine	17	19	20	27	28	31	49	51	41	38	31	28	32
Source: China Meteorological Administration
