= Fengxin County =

Fengxin County 奉新县 Fengsin
- County
- Location in Jiangxi
- Coordinates: 28°44′N 115°10′E
- Country: People's Republic of China
- Province: Jiangxi
- Prefecture-level city: Yichun

Area
  - Total: 1,642 km^{2} (634 sq mi)

Population (2019)
  - Total: 336,400
  - Density: 204.9/km^{2} (530.6/sq mi)
- Time zone: UTC+8 (China Standard)
- Postal Code: 330700

Fengxin County (simplified Chinese: 奉新县; traditional Chinese: 奉新縣; pinyin: Fèngxīn Xiàn) is a county in the northwest of Jiangxi province, People's Republic of China. It is under the jurisdiction of the prefecture-level city of Yichun.

== Administrative divisions ==
In the present, Fengxin County has 10 towns and 3 townships.

10 towns

- Fengchuan (冯川镇)
- Chi'an (赤岸镇)
- Chitian (赤田镇)
- Songbu (宋埠镇)
- Ganzhou (干洲镇)
- Zaoxia (澡下镇)
- Huibu (会埠镇)
- Luoshi (罗市镇)
- Shangfu (上富镇)
- Ganfang (甘坊镇)

3 townships

- Yangshan (仰山乡)
- Zaoxi (澡溪乡)
- Liuxi (柳溪乡)

== Demographics ==
The population of the district was 287,241 in 1999.

== Climate ==
Climate data for Fengxin, elevation 80 m (260 ft), (1991–2020 normals, extremes 1981–2010)
Month	Jan	Feb	Mar	Apr	May	Jun	Jul	Aug	Sep	Oct	Nov	Dec	Year
Record high °C (°F)	23.5 (74.3)	28.4 (83.1)	32.4 (90.3)	34.8 (94.6)	35.9 (96.6)	37.0 (98.6)	39.8 (103.6)	41.0 (105.8)	38.4 (101.1)	35.9 (96.6)	31.0 (87.8)	24.3 (75.7)	41.0 (105.8)
Mean daily maximum °C (°F)	9.5 (49.1)	12.3 (54.1)	16.4 (61.5)	22.8 (73.0)	27.4 (81.3)	29.9 (85.8)	33.6 (92.5)	33.3 (91.9)	29.8 (85.6)	24.9 (76.8)	18.6 (65.5)	12.4 (54.3)	22.6 (72.6)
Daily mean °C (°F)	5.6 (42.1)	8.1 (46.6)	12.0 (53.6)	18.1 (64.6)	22.9 (73.2)	25.8 (78.4)	29.1 (84.4)	28.5 (83.3)	24.9 (76.8)	19.5 (67.1)	13.5 (56.3)	7.7 (45.9)	18.0 (64.4)
Mean daily minimum °C (°F)	2.8 (37.0)	5.0 (41.0)	8.7 (47.7)	14.4 (57.9)	19.2 (66.6)	22.7 (72.9)	25.5 (77.9)	25.0 (77.0)	21.2 (70.2)	15.6 (60.1)	9.7 (49.5)	4.3 (39.7)	14.5 (58.1)
Record low °C (°F)	−5.7 (21.7)	−4.9 (23.2)	−3.5 (25.7)	1.0 (33.8)	9.9 (49.8)	13.2 (55.8)	18.1 (64.6)	18.0 (64.4)	11.9 (53.4)	2.5 (36.5)	−2.0 (28.4)	−15.8 (3.6)	−15.8 (3.6)
Average precipitation mm (inches)	82.2 (3.24)	95.3 (3.75)	177.8 (7.00)	217.8 (8.57)	247.0 (9.72)	328.0 (12.91)	203.5 (8.01)	134.4 (5.29)	80.1 (3.15)	51.0 (2.01)	87.4 (3.44)	52.1 (2.05)	1,756.6 (69.14)
Average precipitation days (≥ 0.1 mm)	13.4	13.3	17.4	16.8	15.8	16.6	12.6	12.0	7.7	7.1	9.6	10.0	152.3
Average snowy days	3.0	2.1	0.6	0	0	0	0	0	0	0	0.1	1.0	6.8
Average relative humidity (%)	78	78	80	78	78	83	78	78	76	73	75	75	78
Mean monthly sunshine hours	84.7	85.1	97.7	124.2	147.6	138.7	219.8	215.0	181.2	166.8	136.1	125.3	1,722.2
Percentage possible sunshine	26	27	26	32	35	33	52	53	49	47	43	39	39
Source: China Meteorological Administration
