= Yifeng County =

Yifeng County 宜丰县 Ifeng
- County
- Location in Jiangxi
- Coordinates: 28°23′38″N 114°48′14″E
- Country: People's Republic of China
- Province: Jiangxi
- Prefecture-level city: Yichun

Area
  - Total: 1,935 km^{2} (747 sq mi)

Population (2018)
  - Total: 301,000
  - Density: 156/km^{2} (403/sq mi)
- Time zone: UTC+8 (China Standard)
- Postal Code: 336300

Yifeng County (simplified Chinese: 宜丰县; traditional Chinese: 宜豐縣; pinyin: Yífēng Xiàn) is a county in the northwest of Jiangxi province, People's Republic of China. It is under the jurisdiction of the prefecture-level city of Yichun.

== Administrative divisions ==
Yifeng County currently has 7 towns and 5 townships.

7 towns

- Xinchang (新昌镇)
- Chengtang (澄塘镇)
- Tangpu (棠浦镇)
- Xinzhuang (新庄镇)
- Tanshan (潭山镇)
- Fangxi (芳溪镇)
- Shishi (石市镇)

5 townships

- Huaqiao (花桥乡)
- Tong'an (同安乡)
- Tianbao (天宝乡)
- Huanggang (黄岗乡)
- Qiaoxi (桥西乡)

== Demographics ==
The population of the district was 263,563 in 1999.

== Climate ==
Climate data for Yifeng, elevation 92 m (302 ft), (1991–2020 normals, extremes 1981–2010)
Month	Jan	Feb	Mar	Apr	May	Jun	Jul	Aug	Sep	Oct	Nov	Dec	Year
Record high °C (°F)	25.0 (77.0)	28.8 (83.8)	35.0 (95.0)	35.3 (95.5)	35.9 (96.6)	37.5 (99.5)	40.3 (104.5)	41.4 (106.5)	38.5 (101.3)	36.5 (97.7)	32.4 (90.3)	25.5 (77.9)	41.4 (106.5)
Mean daily maximum °C (°F)	9.9 (49.8)	12.7 (54.9)	16.6 (61.9)	23.0 (73.4)	27.5 (81.5)	30.2 (86.4)	33.7 (92.7)	33.5 (92.3)	30.1 (86.2)	25.0 (77.0)	18.9 (66.0)	12.8 (55.0)	22.8 (73.1)
Daily mean °C (°F)	5.6 (42.1)	8.1 (46.6)	11.9 (53.4)	17.8 (64.0)	22.5 (72.5)	25.6 (78.1)	28.5 (83.3)	28.1 (82.6)	24.6 (76.3)	19.1 (66.4)	13.1 (55.6)	7.5 (45.5)	17.7 (63.9)
Mean daily minimum °C (°F)	2.8 (37.0)	5.0 (41.0)	8.5 (47.3)	14.0 (57.2)	18.7 (65.7)	22.3 (72.1)	24.6 (76.3)	24.4 (75.9)	20.8 (69.4)	15.1 (59.2)	9.3 (48.7)	4.0 (39.2)	14.1 (57.4)
Record low °C (°F)	−7.0 (19.4)	−5.2 (22.6)	−4.5 (23.9)	0.1 (32.2)	8.3 (46.9)	13.1 (55.6)	17.7 (63.9)	18.0 (64.4)	12.2 (54.0)	0.8 (33.4)	−2.9 (26.8)	−9.6 (14.7)	−9.6 (14.7)
Average precipitation mm (inches)	89.2 (3.51)	102.7 (4.04)	190.0 (7.48)	211.4 (8.32)	264.8 (10.43)	317.3 (12.49)	190.6 (7.50)	145.5 (5.73)	92.4 (3.64)	60.4 (2.38)	98.5 (3.88)	64.6 (2.54)	1,827.4 (71.94)
Average precipitation days (≥ 0.1 mm)	15.5	14.9	19.2	18.0	17.1	17.0	13.5	13.4	9.6	9.0	11.1	11.5	169.8
Average snowy days	3.0	1.7	0.3	0	0	0	0	0	0	0	0.1	0.9	6
Average relative humidity (%)	84	84	84	83	83	85	81	81	81	80	82	82	83
Mean monthly sunshine hours	67.2	68.9	78.2	104.2	124.9	116.2	199.9	188.2	157.8	143.3	118.9	109.0	1,476.7
Percentage possible sunshine	21	22	21	27	30	28	47	47	43	41	37	34	33
Source: China Meteorological Administration
