= Shangyou County =

Shangyou County 上犹县 Shangyiu; Shangyu
- County

- Shangyou in Jiangxi
- Coordinates: 25°47′06″N 114°33′04″E
- Country: People's Republic of China
- Province: Jiangxi
- Prefecture-level city: Ganzhou

Area
  - Total: 1,543 km^{2} (596 sq mi)

Population (2025)
  - Total: 265,700
  - Density: 172.2/km^{2} (446.0/sq mi)
- Postal Code: 341200

Shangyou County (simplified Chinese: 上犹县; traditional Chinese: 上猶縣; pinyin: Shàngyóu Xiàn) is a county in the southwest of Jiangxi province, bordering Hunan province to the west. It is under the jurisdiction of the prefecture-level city of Ganzhou.

== Administration ==
The county executive, legislature, judiciary are at Dongshan Town (东山镇), together with the CPC and PSB branches.

Shangyou County is divided to 5 towns and 9 townships.

5 Towns

- Dongshan (东山镇)
- Doushui (陡水镇)
- Shexi (社溪镇)
- Yingqian (营前镇)
- Huangbu (黄埠镇)

9 Townships

- Meishui Township (梅水乡)
- Youshi Township (油石乡)
- Anhe Township (安和乡)
- Sixia Township (寺下乡)
- Shuangxi Township (双溪乡)
- Shuiyan Township (水岩乡)
- Pingfu Township (平富乡)
- Wuzhifeng Township (五指峰乡)
- Ziyang Township (紫阳乡)

== Climate ==
Climate data for Shangyou, elevation 140 m (460 ft), (1991–2020 normals, extremes 1981–present)
| Month | Jan | Feb | Mar | Apr | May | Jun | Jul | Aug | Sep | Oct | Nov | Dec | Year |
|---|---|---|---|---|---|---|---|---|---|---|---|---|---|
| Record high °C (°F) | 26.6 (79.9) | 30.8 (87.4) | 33.9 (93.0) | 35.0 (95.0) | 36.5 (97.7) | 37.8 (100.0) | 40.0 (104.0) | 40.0 (104.0) | 38.6 (101.5) | 36.5 (97.7) | 33.3 (91.9) | 28.1 (82.6) | 40.0 (104.0) |
| Mean daily maximum °C (°F) | 13.0 (55.4) | 15.8 (60.4) | 18.7 (65.7) | 24.9 (76.8) | 29.0 (84.2) | 31.7 (89.1) | 34.5 (94.1) | 34.0 (93.2) | 31.0 (87.8) | 26.8 (80.2) | 21.5 (70.7) | 15.6 (60.1) | 24.7 (76.5) |
| Daily mean °C (°F) | 8.3 (46.9) | 10.7 (51.3) | 13.9 (57.0) | 19.6 (67.3) | 23.8 (74.8) | 26.6 (79.9) | 28.7 (83.7) | 28.1 (82.6) | 25.6 (78.1) | 21.1 (70.0) | 15.6 (60.1) | 10.0 (50.0) | 19.3 (66.8) |
| Mean daily minimum °C (°F) | 5.3 (41.5) | 7.5 (45.5) | 10.8 (51.4) | 16.0 (60.8) | 20.2 (68.4) | 23.2 (73.8) | 24.5 (76.1) | 24.3 (75.7) | 21.9 (71.4) | 17.1 (62.8) | 11.8 (53.2) | 6.4 (43.5) | 15.8 (60.3) |
| Record low °C (°F) | −4.0 (24.8) | −3.4 (25.9) | −2.2 (28.0) | 3.4 (38.1) | 10.8 (51.4) | 14.5 (58.1) | 19.0 (66.2) | 20.2 (68.4) | 13.7 (56.7) | 4.5 (40.1) | −0.5 (31.1) | −5.7 (21.7) | −5.7 (21.7) |
| Average precipitation mm (inches) | 69.0 (2.72) | 91.9 (3.62) | 166.2 (6.54) | 158.3 (6.23) | 213.6 (8.41) | 233.2 (9.18) | 137.9 (5.43) | 166.1 (6.54) | 97.8 (3.85) | 48.3 (1.90) | 62.0 (2.44) | 47.3 (1.86) | 1,491.6 (58.72) |
| Average precipitation days (≥ 0.1 mm) | 11.3 | 12.5 | 18.3 | 16.2 | 17.6 | 17.5 | 12.5 | 14.4 | 9.7 | 6.1 | 7.9 | 8.3 | 152.3 |
| Average snowy days | 1.1 | 0.8 | 0.2 | 0 | 0 | 0 | 0 | 0 | 0 | 0 | 0 | 0.4 | 2.5 |
| Average relative humidity (%) | 77 | 78 | 82 | 80 | 80 | 81 | 76 | 77 | 76 | 72 | 76 | 75 | 78 |
| Mean monthly sunshine hours | 77.3 | 72.1 | 68.2 | 95.1 | 117.8 | 131.2 | 215.9 | 196.1 | 160.2 | 160.0 | 130.0 | 116.8 | 1,540.7 |
| Percentage possible sunshine | 23 | 23 | 18 | 25 | 28 | 32 | 52 | 49 | 44 | 45 | 40 | 36 | 35 |
Source: China Meteorological Administration
