= Shanggao County =

Shanggao County 上高县 Shangkao
- County
- Shanggao in Jiangxi
- Coordinates: 28°14′20″N 114°56′53″E
- Country: People's Republic of China
- Province: Jiangxi
- Prefecture-level city: Yichun

Area
  - Total: 1,350 km^{2} (520 sq mi)

Population (2018)
  - Total: 384,000
  - Density: 284/km^{2} (737/sq mi)
- Time zone: UTC+8 (China Standard)
- Postal Code: 336400

Shanggao County (simplified Chinese: 上高县; traditional Chinese: 上高縣; pinyin: Shànggāo Xiàn) is a county in the northwest of Jiangxi province, People's Republic of China. It is under the jurisdiction of the prefecture-level city of Yichun.

== Administrative divisions ==
In the present, Shanggao County has 3 subdistricts, 11 towns and 10 townships.

3 Subdistricts

- Xuri (旭日街道)
- Luoqiao (罗桥街道)
- Xingyuan (兴园街道)

11 towns

- Tiandun (田墩镇)
- Shanglu (上泸镇)
- Huatanshan (华坛山镇)
- Chating (茶亭镇)
- Zaotou (皂头镇)
- Sishiba (四十八镇)
- Fenglingtou (枫岭头镇)
- Huanggu (煌固镇)
- Huating (花厅镇)
- Wufushan (五府山镇)
- Zhengfang (郑坊镇)

10 townships

- Wangxian (望仙乡)
- Shiren (石人乡)
- Qingshui (清水乡)
- Shishi (石狮乡)
- Hucun (湖村乡)
- Zunqiao (尊桥乡)
- Yingjia (应家乡)
- Huangshaling (黄沙岭乡)
- Tieshan (铁山乡)
- Dongtuan (董团乡)

== Demographics ==
The population of the district was 331,082 in 1999.

== Climate ==
Climate data for Shanggao, elevation 93 m (305 ft), (1991–2020 normals, extremes 1981–2010)
Month	Jan	Feb	Mar	Apr	May	Jun	Jul	Aug	Sep	Oct	Nov	Dec	Year
Record high °C (°F)	25.7 (78.3)	29.5 (85.1)	35.1 (95.2)	35.4 (95.7)	36.7 (98.1)	38.5 (101.3)	40.6 (105.1)	40.8 (105.4)	38.6 (101.5)	36.2 (97.2)	31.5 (88.7)	25.0 (77.0)	40.8 (105.4)
Mean daily maximum °C (°F)	9.7 (49.5)	12.6 (54.7)	16.6 (61.9)	23.1 (73.6)	27.6 (81.7)	30.4 (86.7)	34.1 (93.4)	33.7 (92.7)	30.1 (86.2)	25.0 (77.0)	18.8 (65.8)	12.6 (54.7)	22.9 (73.2)
Daily mean °C (°F)	6.1 (43.0)	8.5 (47.3)	12.3 (54.1)	18.4 (65.1)	23.1 (73.6)	26.1 (79.0)	29.3 (84.7)	28.8 (83.8)	25.2 (77.4)	19.9 (67.8)	13.9 (57.0)	8.2 (46.8)	18.3 (65.0)
Mean daily minimum °C (°F)	3.4 (38.1)	5.6 (42.1)	9.2 (48.6)	14.9 (58.8)	19.6 (67.3)	23.0 (73.4)	25.7 (78.3)	25.3 (77.5)	21.7 (71.1)	16.2 (61.2)	10.3 (50.5)	4.9 (40.8)	15.0 (59.0)
Record low °C (°F)	−5.4 (22.3)	−4.0 (24.8)	−1.5 (29.3)	2.0 (35.6)	9.9 (49.8)	15.1 (59.2)	18.7 (65.7)	19.4 (66.9)	14.0 (57.2)	4.1 (39.4)	−0.8 (30.6)	−10.0 (14.0)	−10.0 (14.0)
Average precipitation mm (inches)	88.0 (3.46)	102.2 (4.02)	187.4 (7.38)	210.8 (8.30)	253.4 (9.98)	297.1 (11.70)	174.1 (6.85)	126.3 (4.97)	85.1 (3.35)	55.1 (2.17)	96.1 (3.78)	65.6 (2.58)	1,741.2 (68.54)
Average precipitation days (≥ 0.1 mm)	14.2	13.8	18.5	17.7	16.4	16.7	11.7	12.3	8.4	8.7	11.0	11.2	160.6
Average snowy days	2.7	1.6	0.3	0	0	0	0	0	0	0	0	0.8	5.4
Average relative humidity (%)	79	79	81	79	79	82	76	77	76	74	77	76	78
Mean monthly sunshine hours	66.7	69.8	78.8	107.8	126.3	122.9	205.3	193.8	156.4	145.6	118.0	107.4	1,498.8
Percentage possible sunshine	20	22	21	28	30	30	49	48	43	41	37	34	34
Source: China Meteorological Administration
