= Jinxian County =

Jinxian 进贤县
- County
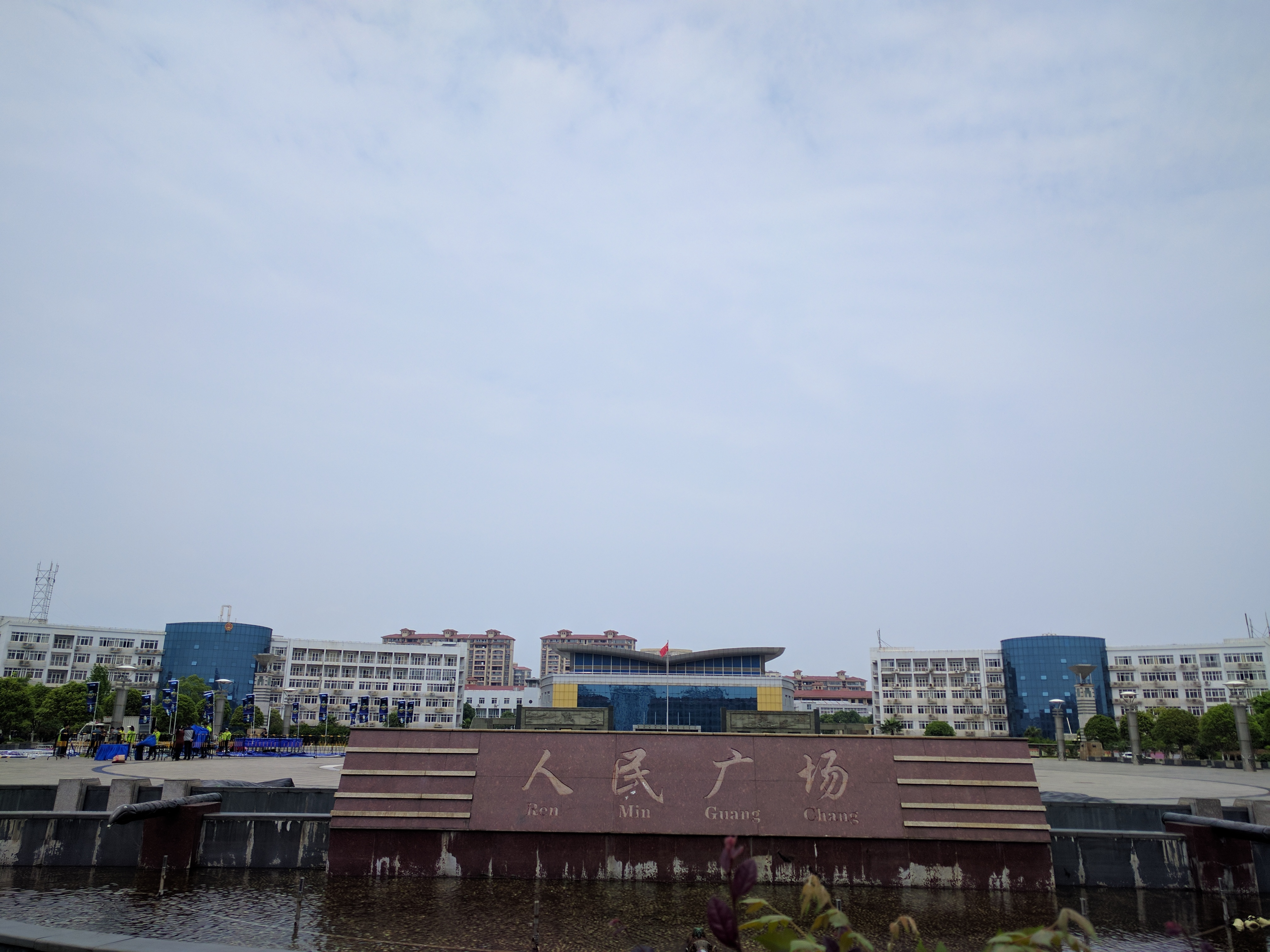
- Interactive map of Jinxian
- Coordinates: 28°22′37″N 116°14′27″E
- Country: People's Republic of China
- Province: Jiangxi
- Prefecture-level city: Nanchang

Area
  - Total: 1,952 km^{2} (754 sq mi)

Population (2018)
  - Total: 850,500
  - Density: 435.7/km^{2} (1,128/sq mi)
- Time zone: UTC+8 (China Standard)
- Postal code: 331700

Jinxian County (simplified Chinese: 进贤县; traditional Chinese: 進賢縣; pinyin: Jìnxián Xiàn) is a county of Jiangxi Province, China, it is under the administration of the prefecture-level city of Nanchang, the provincial capital.

== Administrative divisions ==
Jinxian County has 9 towns and 12 townships.

9 towns

- Minhe (民和镇)
- Lidu (李渡镇)
- Wenzhen (温圳镇)
- Wengang (文港镇)
- Meizhuang (梅庄镇)
- Zhanggong (张公镇)
- Luoxi (罗溪镇)
- Jiaqiao (架桥镇)
- Qianfang (前坊镇)

12 townships

- Sanli (三里乡)
- Ertang (二塘乡)
- Zhongling (钟陵乡)
- Chixi (池溪乡)
- Nantai (南台乡)
- Sanyangji (三阳集乡)
- Qili (七里乡)
- Xiabuji (下埠集乡)
- Yaqian (衙前乡)
- Baixu (白圩乡)
- Changshanyan (长山晏乡)
- Quanling (泉岭乡)

== Climate ==
Climate data for Jinxian, elevation 67 m (220 ft), (1991–2020 normals, extremes 1981–present)
Month	Jan	Feb	Mar	Apr	May	Jun	Jul	Aug	Sep	Oct	Nov	Dec	Year
Record high °C (°F)	25.5 (77.9)	29.4 (84.9)	33.8 (92.8)	35.7 (96.3)	36.5 (97.7)	37.8 (100.0)	40.5 (104.9)	40.5 (104.9)	38.8 (101.8)	35.7 (96.3)	32.2 (90.0)	24.6 (76.3)	40.5 (104.9)
Mean daily maximum °C (°F)	9.2 (48.6)	12.2 (54.0)	16.4 (61.5)	23.0 (73.4)	27.6 (81.7)	30.3 (86.5)	34.3 (93.7)	33.7 (92.7)	29.8 (85.6)	24.5 (76.1)	18.4 (65.1)	11.9 (53.4)	22.6 (72.7)
Daily mean °C (°F)	5.8 (42.4)	8.4 (47.1)	12.3 (54.1)	18.5 (65.3)	23.4 (74.1)	26.3 (79.3)	29.9 (85.8)	29.3 (84.7)	25.4 (77.7)	20.0 (68.0)	13.9 (57.0)	7.9 (46.2)	18.4 (65.1)
Mean daily minimum °C (°F)	3.3 (37.9)	5.6 (42.1)	9.4 (48.9)	15.2 (59.4)	20.1 (68.2)	23.3 (73.9)	26.4 (79.5)	26.0 (78.8)	22.3 (72.1)	16.7 (62.1)	10.8 (51.4)	5.0 (41.0)	15.3 (59.6)
Record low °C (°F)	−4.4 (24.1)	−5.4 (22.3)	−1.0 (30.2)	3.8 (38.8)	10.2 (50.4)	14.7 (58.5)	19.9 (67.8)	19.8 (67.6)	14.8 (58.6)	5.1 (41.2)	−2.1 (28.2)	−12.1 (10.2)	−12.1 (10.2)
Average precipitation mm (inches)	90.7 (3.57)	107.6 (4.24)	205.7 (8.10)	227.1 (8.94)	224.7 (8.85)	341.6 (13.45)	174.4 (6.87)	131.6 (5.18)	67.2 (2.65)	56.1 (2.21)	103.6 (4.08)	68.7 (2.70)	1,799 (70.84)
Average precipitation days (≥ 0.1 mm)	14.1	13.6	18.1	17.2	15.7	16.8	11.0	10.3	7.4	7.6	10.1	10.5	152.4
Average snowy days	2.5	1.4	0.3	0	0	0	0	0	0	0	0	1.0	5.2
Average relative humidity (%)	81	81	82	79	79	82	73	75	77	76	78	78	78
Mean monthly sunshine hours	78.4	79.6	89.9	117.7	139.9	134.5	228.7	216.2	175.7	157.2	125.3	114.4	1,657.5
Percentage possible sunshine	24	25	24	31	33	32	54	54	48	45	39	36	37
Source: China Meteorological Administration
