= Taihe railway station =

Railway station in Ji'an, China

Taihe 泰和
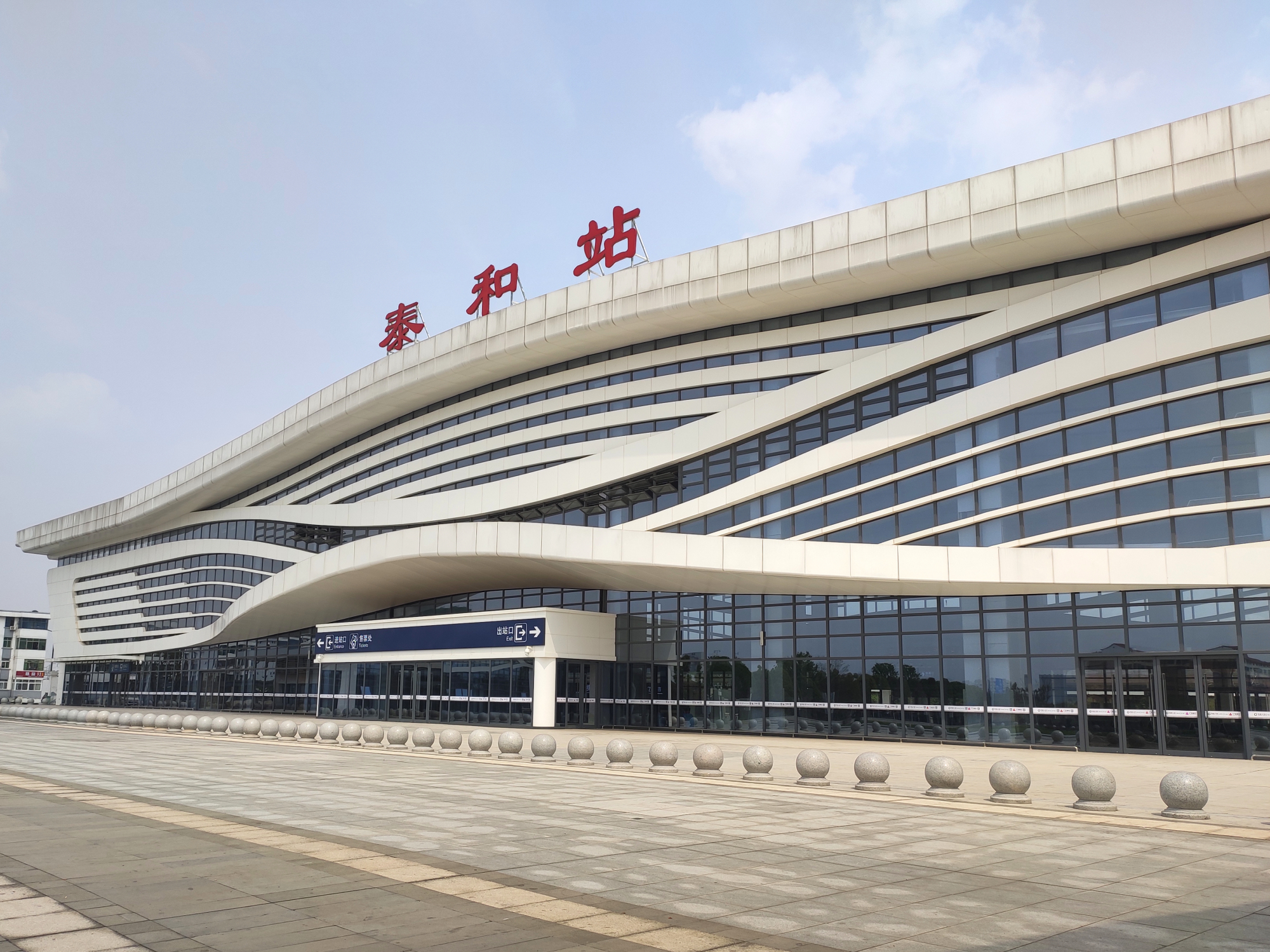

General information
- Location: Taihe County, Ji'an, Jiangxi; China
- Coordinates: 26.8356°N 114.9443°E
- Operated by: China Railway Corporation
- Line(s): Beijing–Kowloon railway Nanchang–Ganzhou high-speed railway

History
- Opened: 1996

Taihe railway station is a railway station located in Taihe County, Ji'an, Jiangxi, China.

== History ==
The station opened in 1996 with the Beijing–Kowloon railway.

On 1 January 2006, the name of this station was changed from Jinggangshan to Taihe. A new Jinggangshan railway station opened in 2007 much closer to Jinggangshan itself. The new high-speed line opened in December.

In preparation for the opening of the Nanchang–Ganzhou high-speed railway, the station was rebuilt. The new station opened on 16 July 2019.

Preceding station	China Railway	Following station
Ji'an towards Beijing West	Beijing–Kowloon railway	Xingguo towards Hung Hom
Preceding station	China Railway High-speed	Following station
Ji'an West towards Nanchang	Nanchang–Ganzhou high-speed railway	Wan'anxian towards Ganzhou West
