= Xiajiang railway station =

Railway station in Ji'an, China

Xiajiang 峡江
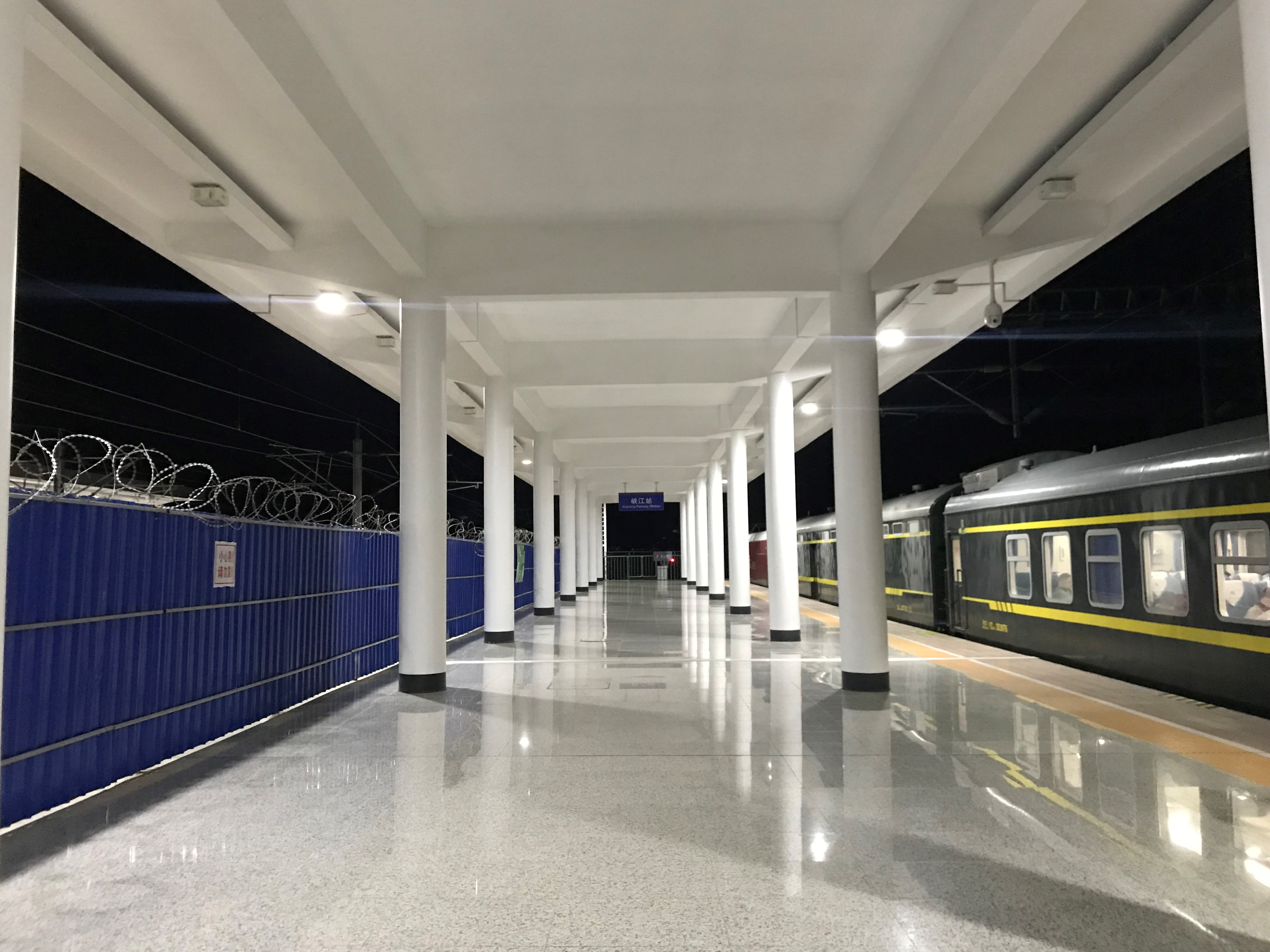
- Xiajiang railway station

General information
- Location: Xiajiang County, Ji'an, Jiangxi; China
- Coordinates: 27.601667°N 115.331111°E
- Operator: China Railway Corporation
- Lines: Beijing–Kowloon railway Nanchang–Ganzhou high-speed railway

History
- Opened: 1996
Location
- Location within China

Xiajiang railway station is a railway station located in Xiajiang County, Ji'an, Jiangxi, China.

== History ==
The station opened with the Beijing–Kowloon railway in 1996. In May 2007, services were cut to one passenger service in each direction per day. However, in October 2012 a more frequent service was restored.

In preparation for the opening of the Nanchang–Ganzhou high-speed railway, the station was rebuilt. The new station opened on 17 July 2019.

Preceding station	China Railway	Following station
Xingan towards Beijing West	Beijing–Kowloon railway	Ji'an towards Hung Hom
Preceding station	China Railway High-speed	Following station
Jishui West towards Nanchang	Nanchang–Ganzhou high-speed railway	Xingan East towards Ganzhou West
