= Ji'an Evening Post =

Newspaper in Ji'an, China

- Type: Daily newspaper
- Owner: Jinggangshan Daily Agency
- Founded: July 1, 1993
- Language: Chinese
- Headquarters: Ji'an
- Website: Ji'an Evening Post

The Ji'an Evening Post (Chinese: 吉安晚报), also known as Ji'an Evening News, was a Chinese-language evening newspaper published in China. It was founded in Ji'an on July 1, 1993 as a county-level, a Chinese Communist Party newspaper.

In May 2000, the State Council of China permitted Ji'an to revoke its prefectural status and reconstitute itself as a city (撤地设市), and Ji'an Evening Post was transferred to the ownership of the Jinggangshan Daily Agency (井冈山报社).

== History ==
Ji'an Evening Post was introduced on July 1, 1993. On January 1, 2001, the publication underwent a comprehensive revision and was positioned as an urban livelihood newspaper.

At the end of 2019, the paper announced that it would cease publication on January 1, 2020.
