= Zhangshu East railway station =

Railway station in Zhangshu, Yichun, Jiangxi

Zhangshu East 樟树东
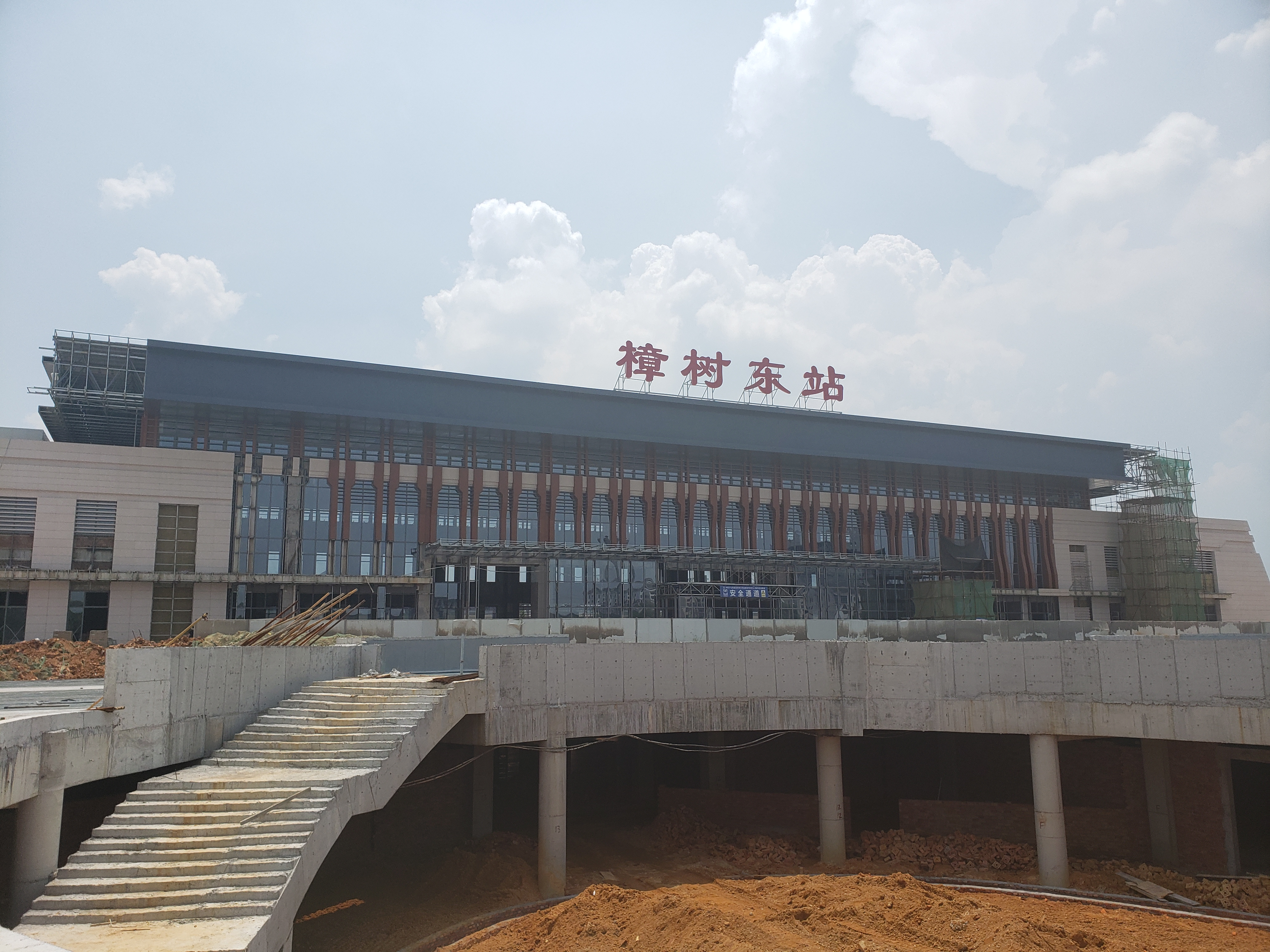

General information
- Location: Zhangshu, Yichun, Jiangxi; China
- Coordinates: 27°58′0.69″N 115°35′44.22″E
- Lines: Beijing–Kowloon railway; Nanchang–Ganzhou high-speed railway

History
- Opened: 1996
Location

Zhangshu East railway station (Chinese: 樟树东站; pinyin: Zhāngshù Dōng zhàn) is a railway station in Zhangshu, Yichun, Jiangxi, China. It is an intermediate stop on both the Beijing–Kowloon railway and the Nanchang–Ganzhou high-speed railway. It was opened in 1996. On 26 December 2019, high-speed services began calling at the station.

Preceding station	China Railway	Following station
Fengcheng South towards Beijing West	Beijing–Kowloon railway	Xingan towards Hung Hom
Preceding station	China Railway High-speed	Following station
Fengcheng East towards Nanchang	Nanchang–Ganzhou high-speed railway	Xingan East towards Ganzhou West
