= A Ming Society =

1996 book by John W. Dardess

- Author: John W. Dardess
- Language: English
- Genre: Non-fiction
- Publisher: University of California Press
- Publication date: 1996
- Publication place: United States

A Ming Society: Tai-ho County, Kiangsi, in the Fourteenth to Seventeenth Centuries is a 1996 non-fiction book by John W. Dardess, published by University of California Press. Its main subject is Taihe (T'ai-ho) County, Jiangxi (Kiangsi) in the Ming Dynasty period.

The book discusses Taihe County's social network as well as the relationship with the Chinese central government and the network's disintegration. Jerry Dennerline of Amherst College described it as a "history of a devolving network of literati elite families in T'ai-ho and their culturally and politically most visible members." Cynthia Brokaw wrote that the ebbing of the relationship between the central government and Taihe is the main subject of the book.

Dardess chose to use Taihe County as the subject of the book because of the large number of educated persons there, and because of their significant participation in national politics, not because Taihe was typical of any manner.

Harriet T. Zurndorfer of Leiden University stated that the book both analyzed historical documents and provided an answer for how Taihe responded to the demands of its era.

== Background ==
Morris Rossabi of City University of New York described Dardess as "one of the most distinguished historians of traditional China".

Sources used included veritable records of the court and genealogical records. Many sources about Taihe survived due to the prominence of Taihe people in the Ming governments. Dardess used a lot of collected works, or wenji. Comments discussing paintings, letters, and poems were used as sources for Part I of the book.

Edward L. Farmer of the University of Minnesota wrote that Dardess "is keenly aware of the limits of his sources." He stated that the elite often did not write about the lower social classes, so his records had no information about them. In regards to the official birth statistics showing the birth ratios as 180 male to 100 female, Dardess concluded that much of the skew is due to records not reporting female births and that infanticide targeting baby girls made up to 10% of the gender skew.

== Contents ==
The book has three parts: "The Setting," "The Pressures of Change," and "T'ai-ho Literati in the Wider World of Ming China." The first outlines the geographical layout of the county, including the farming operations and the structure of the county seat, as well as the decline in the cultural importance of the county landscapes; originally Taihe elites made works about their own landscapes, but later they made works about Suzhou instead. Zurndorfer stated "the description of the T'ai-ho landscape incorporates the writing processes that give the landscape both meaning and a sense of power."

The second discusses the sociological elements, including the rural-oriented class structure, as well as the organizations of families and the hiring of government employees. The Taihe officials chose not to become involved in the affairs of wider China as the family associations were replaced by lineage organizations, which acquired large amounts of land; since Taihe elites focused on their locally developed organizations, this distanced Taihe from the wider country. The people of Taihe County saw a perceived decline in the morality of the persons prominent in the economy of Taihe and asked for intervention from the central government. Chapter 5 discusses how people gained employment in the government and their career trajectories. Catherine Carlitz of the University of Pittsburgh wrote that it "is probably the clearest overview in English of routes into the Ming bureaucracy." Farmer stated that the information on the decline in birthrates and resulting downward mobility among the upper class of Taihe is "Perhaps most interesting to readers of [the Journal of Interdisciplinary History]".

The third discusses how the distancing of relations from the wider country affected the academic culture of Taihe. There were four distinct trends which weakened the academic fabric of Taihe that occurred in the Ming Dynasty. Chu Hung-lam (Note: Chu Hung-lam: traditional Chinese: 朱鴻林; simplified Chinese: 朱鸿林; Jyutping: zyu1 hung4 lam4; pinyin: Zhū Hónglín) of Academia Sinica wrote that "For the student of Ming political and intellectual history, part 3 of this book is especially informative."

== Reception ==
Zurndorfer stated that the book can assist both general readers and specialists and that "raises a number of historiographical issues that should, I hope, create debate between those scholars who see the relevance of situating the results of highly erudite sinological research into the broader stream of historical writing, and those who do not."

Dennerline wrote that Dardess "is a great storyteller[...]to be thanked for his attention to the careful selection and translation of literati words." He concluded that it is "a stunningly detailed moving picture of one part of China, inextricably linked both to the Ming's imperial center and its broadly flowing cultural streams as the developments we seek to understand occurred."

Timothy Brook of the University of Toronto wrote that the book is "local history at its best" and "a careful reconstruction of the first two centuries of the Ming period".

Chu wrote that the book was "splendid account of changes in the social fabric of Tai-ho County from the fourteenth to the seventeenth centuries, as well as shifts in human preoccupations during this period" that "The research in this book is remarkable". He stated the discourse on Yang Shih-ch'i and Lo Ch'in-shun were "illuminating". Chu also praised the newly discovered material about Hu Chih, Ouyang Te, and Yin Chih. He argued that a Chinese glossary would have helped, and he stated there were some mistakes in translation and with Chinese, but "such mistakes have not done much harm to the main argument of the book."

Helen Dunstan wrote in Bulletin of the School of Oriental and African Studies that Dardess had "acumen in bringing the interest of seemingly obscure topics to the attention of the sinological community" and that he "has put Taihe onto the historical map". Dunstan criticized the "elite studies perspective" which limited his finding "obscure" facts and she suggested including "an acknowledgement of the possibility of there having been rich and interesting local colour in the lives of ordinary Taihe people would have made for a more balanced ending to an otherwise fine book."

Farmer stated "Dardess has drawn brilliantly on writings of one county's elite to sketch the contours of change during four centuries."

Rossabi wrote that the book is "a readable and authoritative analysis" and that it "will offer an invaluable means of understanding Ming China".

Romeyn Taylor of the University of Minnesota described it as an "engagingly written monograph", adding that the lack of Chinese characters in the index and in the main body "may prove an inconvenience to some readers."
