= Yueyang North railway station =

Railway station in Yueyang, China

Coordinates: 29.4004°N 113.1510°E

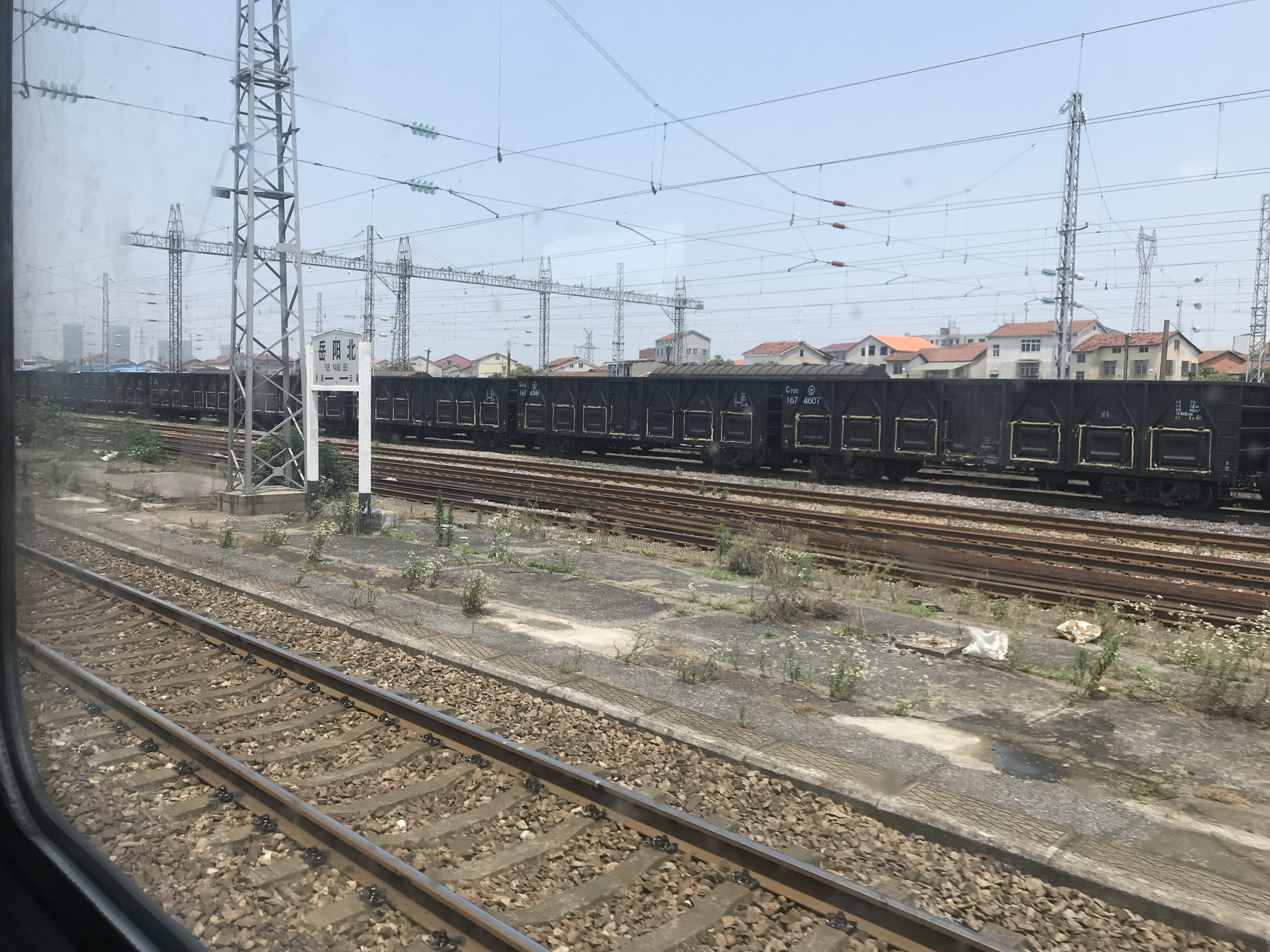
- Tracks at Yueyangbei Station

General information
- System: Freight station

Other information
- Station code: TMIS code: 22778; telegraph code: YEQ; pinyin code: yyb
Location

Yueyang North railway station (Chinese: 岳阳北站) is a freight handling station in Yueyanglou District, Yueyang, Hunan, China. It is situated on the Beijing–Guangzhou railway.

In 2019, a connecting line was opened between the station and the new Haoji Railway.

On 23 December 2021, a project started to expand the station. This was completed on 15 September 2022.
