= Denglong =

Denglong may refer to:

- Paper lantern (灯笼; 燈籠; Dēnglóng), lantern made of thin, brightly colored paper
- Denglong (mythology) (蹬龙; 蹬龍; Dēnglóng), Chinese legendary creature
- Denglong Township, Jiangxi (登龙乡; 登龍鄉; Dēnglóng Xiāng), in Ji'an County, Jiangxi, China
- Denglong Township, Sichuan (登龙乡; 登龍鄉; Dēnglóng Xiāng), in Baiyu County, Sichuan, China
