= Jinggangshan Power Station =

Jinggangshan Power Station 井冈山电厂
- Country: China
- Location: Ji'an, Jiangxi
- Purpose: Power
- Construction began: November 1998
- Construction cost: ¥7.09 billion

Jinggangshan Power Station (Chinese: 井冈山电厂), also spelled Jinggangshan Power Plant, is a large thermal power project, located in Jinggangshan City, Jiangxi Province, China.

== History ==
The construction of Jinggangshan Power Station started in November 1998, the first stage of construction of Jinggangshan Power Plant reached an installed capacity of 600,000 kilowatts, consisting of two 300,000-kilowatt coal-fired generating units.

Jinggangshan Power Station is a key project during China's "Ninth Five-Year Plan" period, with a total installed capacity of 1.92 million kilowatts and a total investment of 7.09 billion yuan.

In August 2001, the first phase of the project was officially put into operation. In December 2009, the second phase of the project was officially put into operation.
