= Nanxi Township =

Nanxi Township 南溪乡
- Township
- Location in Jiangxi Nanxi Township (China)
- Coordinates: 26.8196°N 114.8041°E
- Country: People's Republic of China
- Province: Jiangxi
- Prefecture-level city: Ji'an
- County: Taihe County
- Time zone: UTC+8 (China Standard)

Nanxi Township (simplified Chinese: 南溪乡; traditional Chinese: 南溪鄉; pinyin: Nánxī Xiāng) is a township under the administration of Taihe County in western Jiangxi, China. As of 2020, it administers Baizhu Residential Neighborhood (白竹) and the following eight villages:

- Kuangxi Village (匡溪村)
- Fangqiao Village (芳桥村)
- Zhouwei Village (洲尾村)
- Yuantou Village (源头村)
- Nanyuan Village (南源村)
- Jinxi Village (锦溪村)
- Shanglong Village (上垅村)
- Wuxing Village (五星村)

== See also ==
- List of township-level divisions of Jiangxi
