= Renhe, Xiajiang County =

Renhe 仁和镇
- Town
- Renhe Town
- Location within Jiangxi
- Coordinates: 27°39′26″N 115°15′48″E
- Country: People's Republic of China
- Province: Jiangxi
- Prefecture-level City: Ji'an
- County: Xiajiang County

Area
  - Total: 132 km^{2} (51 sq mi)

Population (2015)
  - Total: 14,339
- Time zone: UTC+8 (China Standard Time)

Renhe is a town in Xiajiang County, Ji'an, Jiangxi, China.

== See also ==
- List of township-level divisions of Jiangxi
