= John Dardess =

American historian (1937–2020)

- Born: January 17, 1937; Chatham, New York
- Died: March 31, 2020 (aged 83); Kansas, United States
- Education: Georgetown University; Columbia University (PhD 1968)
- Scientific career
- Fields: Chinese history
- Workplaces: University of Kansas
- Military career
- Branch: United States Army

John Wolfe Dardess (January 17, 1937 – March 31, 2020) was an American historian of China, especially the Ming dynasty. He wrote nine books on the topic, including A Ming Society. He learned Chinese in the American military, and was posted to Taiwan. Earning his PhD from Columbia University in 1968, he taught at the University of Kansas from 1966 to 2002, becoming director of the Center for East Asian Studies in 1995. One obituary summarised his principal legacy as consisting “not in any particular interpretation he offered, but in a voracious appetite for delving into the written sources, the courage to ask stimulating new questions, and the historical imagination to wonder about the common humanity that linked the authors he read and their communities with his own times." He drew notice for pointing to continuities in Chinese history and drawing parallels between contemporary and Ming politics.

== Books ==
Dardess's books include:

- Conquerors and Confucians: Aspects of Political Change in Late Yuan China (Columbia University Press, 1973)
- Confucianism and Autocracy: Professional Elites in the Founding of the Ming Dynasty (University of California Press, 1983)
- A Ming Society: T'ai-ho County, Kiangsi, in the Fourteenth to Seventeenth Centuries (University of California Press, 1996)
- Blood and History in China. The Donglin Faction and Its Repression, 1620-1627 (University of Hawai'i Press, 2002)
- Governing China, 150-1850 (Hackett Publishing Co., 2010)
- Ming China 1368–1644: A Concise History of a Resilient Empire (Rowman & Littlefield, 2012)
- A Political Life in Ming China: A Grand Secretary and His Times (Rowman & Littlefield, 2013)
- Four Seasons: A Ming Emperor and His Grand Secretaries in Sixteenth-century China (Rowman & Littlefield, 2016)
- More Than the Great Wall: The Northern Frontier and Ming National Security, 1368–1644 (Rowman & Littlefield, 2020)
