= Haoji Railway =

Freight railway in China

Haoji Railway 浩吉铁路

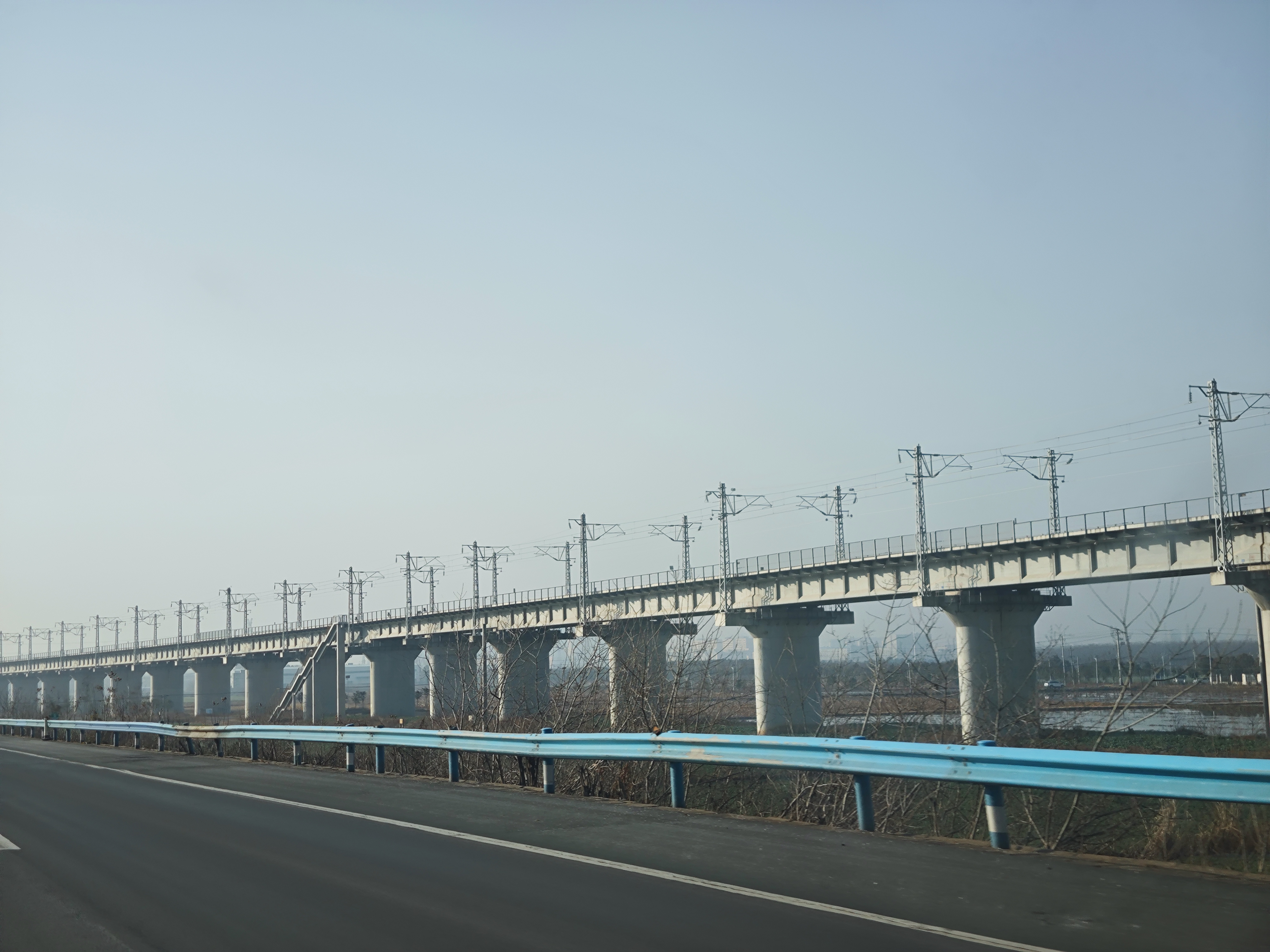
- Haoji Railway in Xiangyang

Overview
- Status: Operational
- Locale: Inner Mongolia, Shaanxi, Shanxi, Henan, Hubei, Hunan, Jiangxi
- Termini: Haolebaoji South railway station, Uxin Banner, Ordos City, Inner Mongolia; Ji'an railway station, Ji'an City, Jiangxi

Service
- Type: Heavy rail
- System: China Railway
- Operator: China Railway

Technical
- Line length: 1,813.5 km (1,127 mi)
- Track gauge: 1,435 mm (4 ft 8 1/2 in)
- Operating speed: 120 km/h

The Haoji Railway (Chinese: 浩吉铁路; pinyin: Hàojí tiělù), fully known as Kholbolji/Haolebaoji to Ji'an railway (Chinese: 浩勒报吉至吉安铁路; pinyin: Hàolèbàojí zhì Jí'ān tiělù), formerly known as Menghua Railway (West Inner Mongolia to Central China), is a 1,813.5 km (1,127 mi) freight-dedicated railway in China. It runs from Haolebaoji South railway station in Uxin Banner, Ordos City, Inner Mongolia to Ji'an railway station in Ji'an City, Jiangxi.

It was built to facilitate coal transport from Inner Mongolia and Shanxi to China's southern provinces at up to 200 million tons a year. The railway is also the first north-south railway in China that is dedicated to coal, and is built to bypass existing coal transport routes that go via coastal cities by ship. The line will reduce transit time from 20 days by sea to just 3 days. The line connects to existing railways at several points to share maintenance facilities. The design speed of the railway is 120 kilometres per hour (75 mph).

The line was approved in 2014 at a cost of US$27.2 billion, financed by China Railway and several large domestic coal mining companies. The railway was inaugurated on 28 September 2019.

== Major engineering works ==
- Hanjiang Bridge, 5,242 metres (3.257 mi) long cable-stayed bridge carrying the railway over the Hanjiang River.
- An 8 kilometres (5.0 mi) long viaduct in Hejin.
- Sanmenxia Bridge, a double-level road-rail bridge over the Yellow River at Sanmenxia.
- Dongting Lake Bridge, cable-stayed bridge over Dongting Lake.

== Operating speed ==
For Jinzhou-Yueyang section only the designated speed is 200km/h rather than 120km/h, although presently not implemented.

== See also ==
- Rail transport in the People's Republic of China
- List of railways in China
