= Ji'an railway station (Jiangxi) =

Railway station in Jiangxi Province, China

Ji'an railway station 吉安站
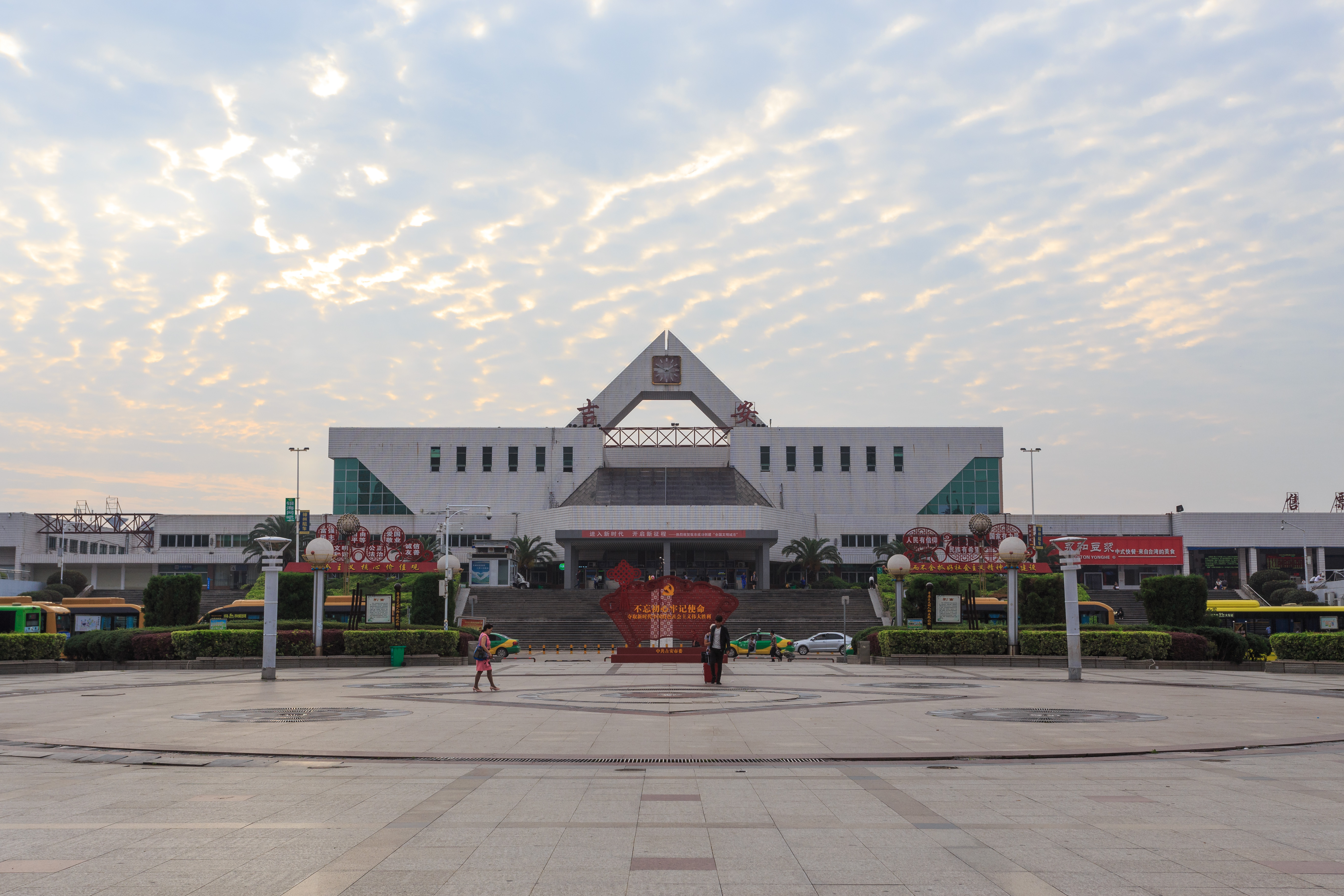

General information
- Location: Qingyuan District, Ji'an, Jiangxi; China
- Coordinates: 27.108611°N 115.016111°E
- Operated by: CR Lanzhou
- Lines: Beijing–Kowloon railway; Ji'an–Hengyang railway; Haoji Railway
- Platforms: 5
- Tracks: 7

Other information
- Classification: Second class station

History
- Opened: 1 September 1996
Location

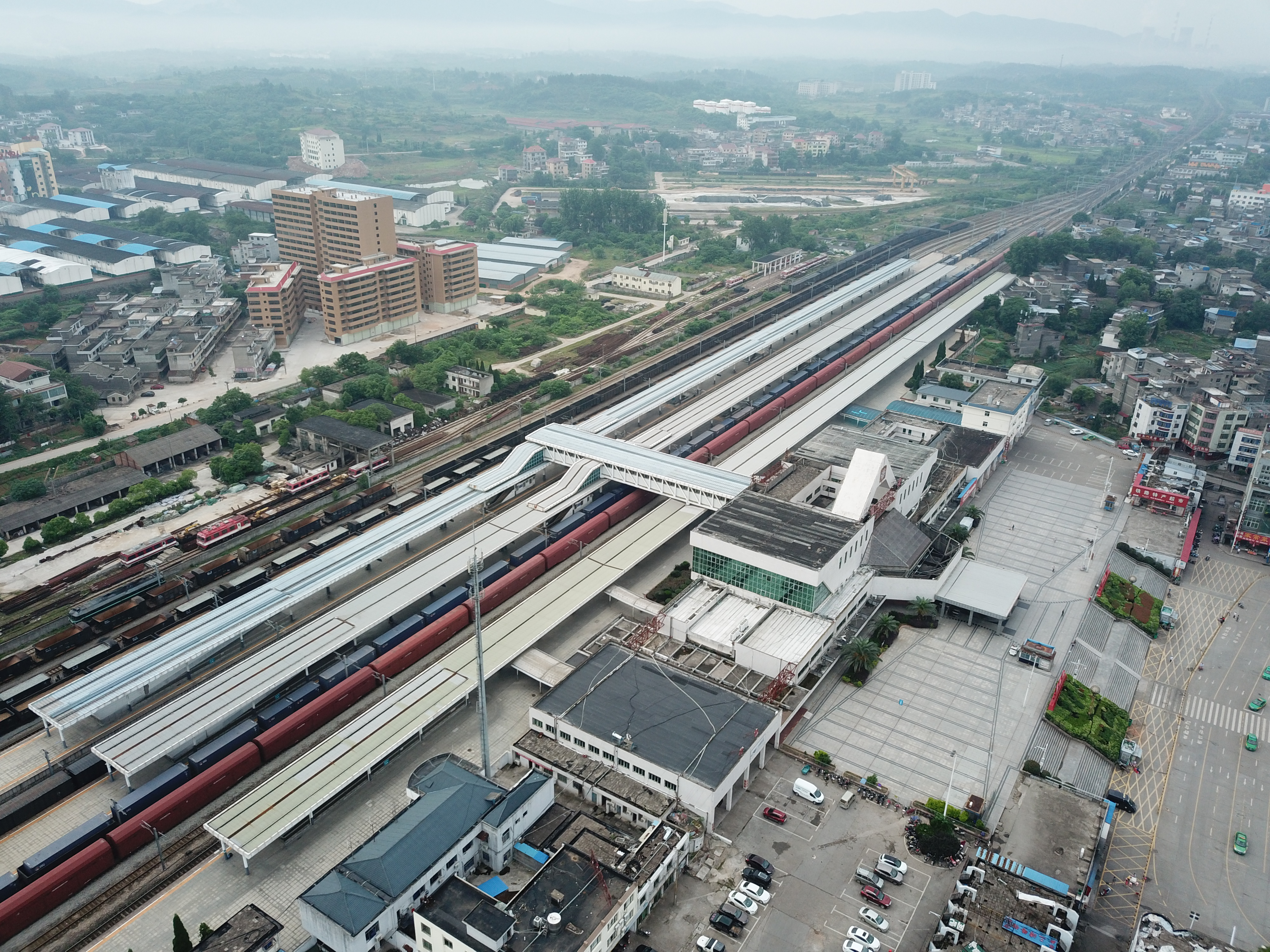
Ji'an Railway Station birds eye view

Ji'an railway station is a railway station on the Beijing–Kowloon railway serving the city of Ji'an. It is also the terminus of the freight-dedicated Haoji Railway. The station was completed in 1996.

Preceding station	China Railway	Following station
Xiajiang towards Beijing West	Beijing–Kowloon railway	Taihe towards Hung Hom
