= Jizhou, Ji'an =

Jizhou 吉州区
- District
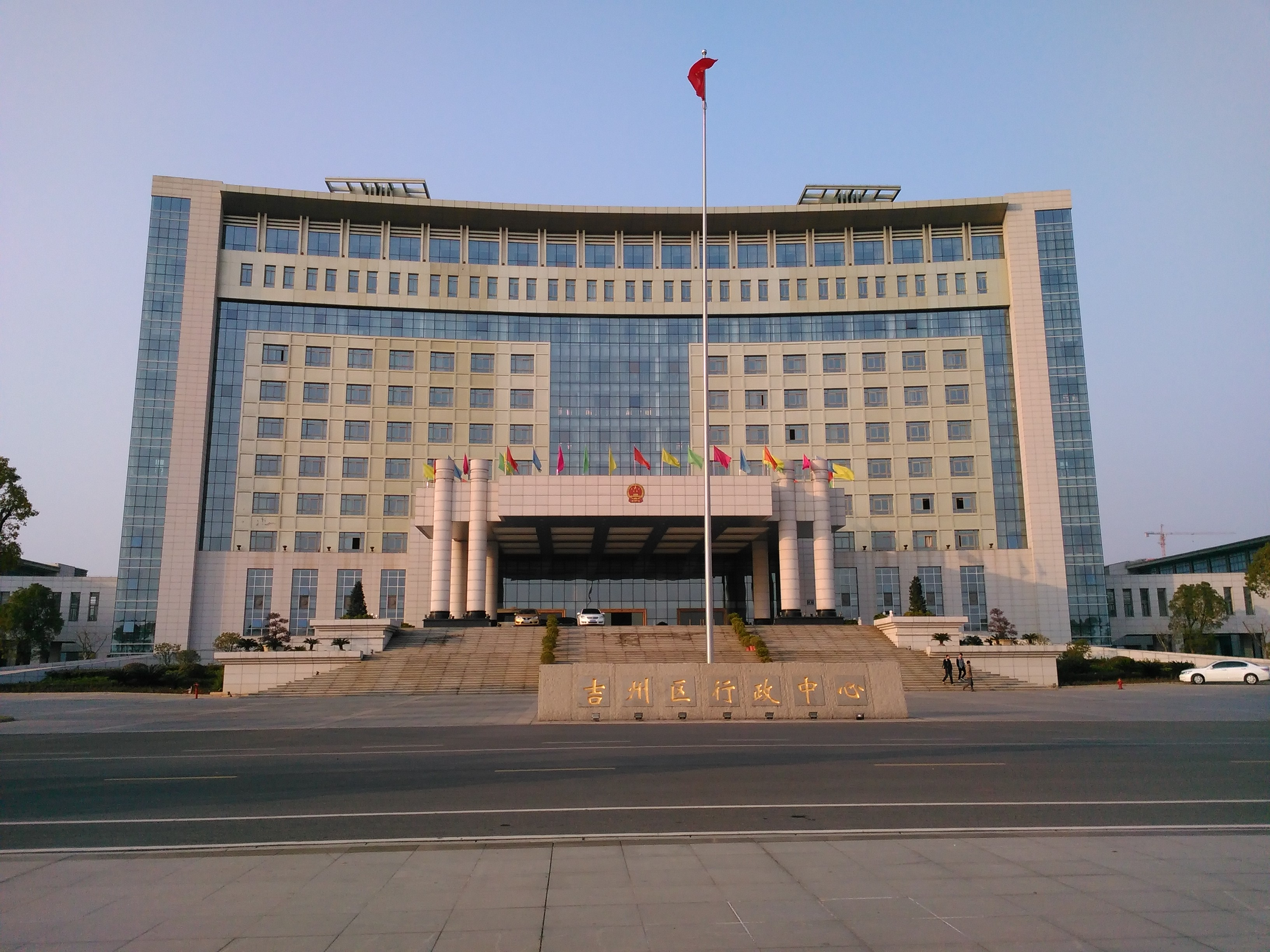
- Jizhou District Hall

- Location in Ji'an City and Jiangxi
- Coordinates: 27°06′24″N 114°58′34″E
- Country: People's Republic of China
- Province: Jiangxi
- Prefecture-level city: Ji'an

Area
  - Total: 425 km^{2} (164 sq mi)
- Elevation: 65 m (213 ft)

Population (2018)
  - Total: 368,000
  - Density: 866/km^{2} (2,240/sq mi)
- Time zone: UTC+8 (China Standard)
- Postal Code: 343000

Jizhou District (simplified Chinese: 吉州区; traditional Chinese: 吉州區; pinyin: Jízhōu Qū) is a district of the city of Ji'an, Jiangxi province, People's Republic of China.

== Administrative divisions ==
In the present, Jizhou District has 7 subdistricts and 4 towns.

7 subdistricts

- Gunan (古南街道)
- Yongshu (永叔街道)
- Wenshan (文山街道)
- Beimen (北门街道)
- Baitang (白塘街道)
- Xixiqiao (习溪桥街道) - is upgraded from town
- Hebu (禾埠街道) - is upgraded from town

4 towns

- Xingqiao (兴桥镇)
- Zhangshan (樟山镇)
- Changtang (长塘镇)
- Qulai (曲濑镇)
