= Xingan railway station =

Railway station in Ji'an, Jiangxi, China

Xingan 新干
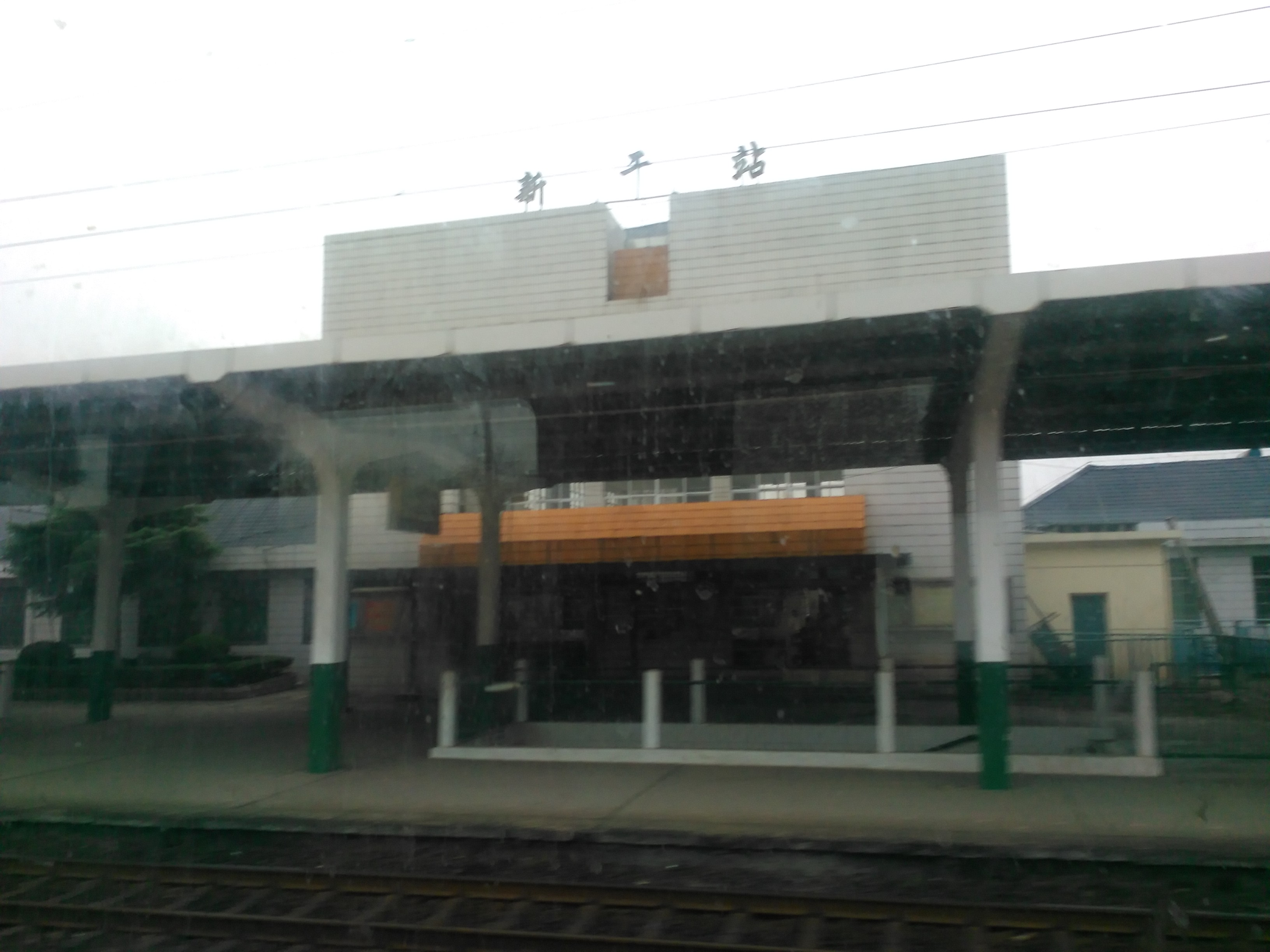

General information
- Location: Xingan County, Ji'an, Jiangxi; China
- Coordinates: 27.7356°N 115.3914°E
- Operated by: China Railway Corporation
- Line(s): Beijing–Kowloon railway

History
- Opened: 1996

Xingan railway station is a railway station located in Xingan County, Ji'an, Jiangxi, China. The station opened with the Beijing–Kowloon railway in 1996.

Preceding station	China Railway	Following station
Zhangshu East towards Beijing West	Beijing–Kowloon railway	Xiajiang towards Hung Hom
