= Ji'an Jinggangshan Airport =

Ji'an Jinggangshan Airport 吉安井冈山机场
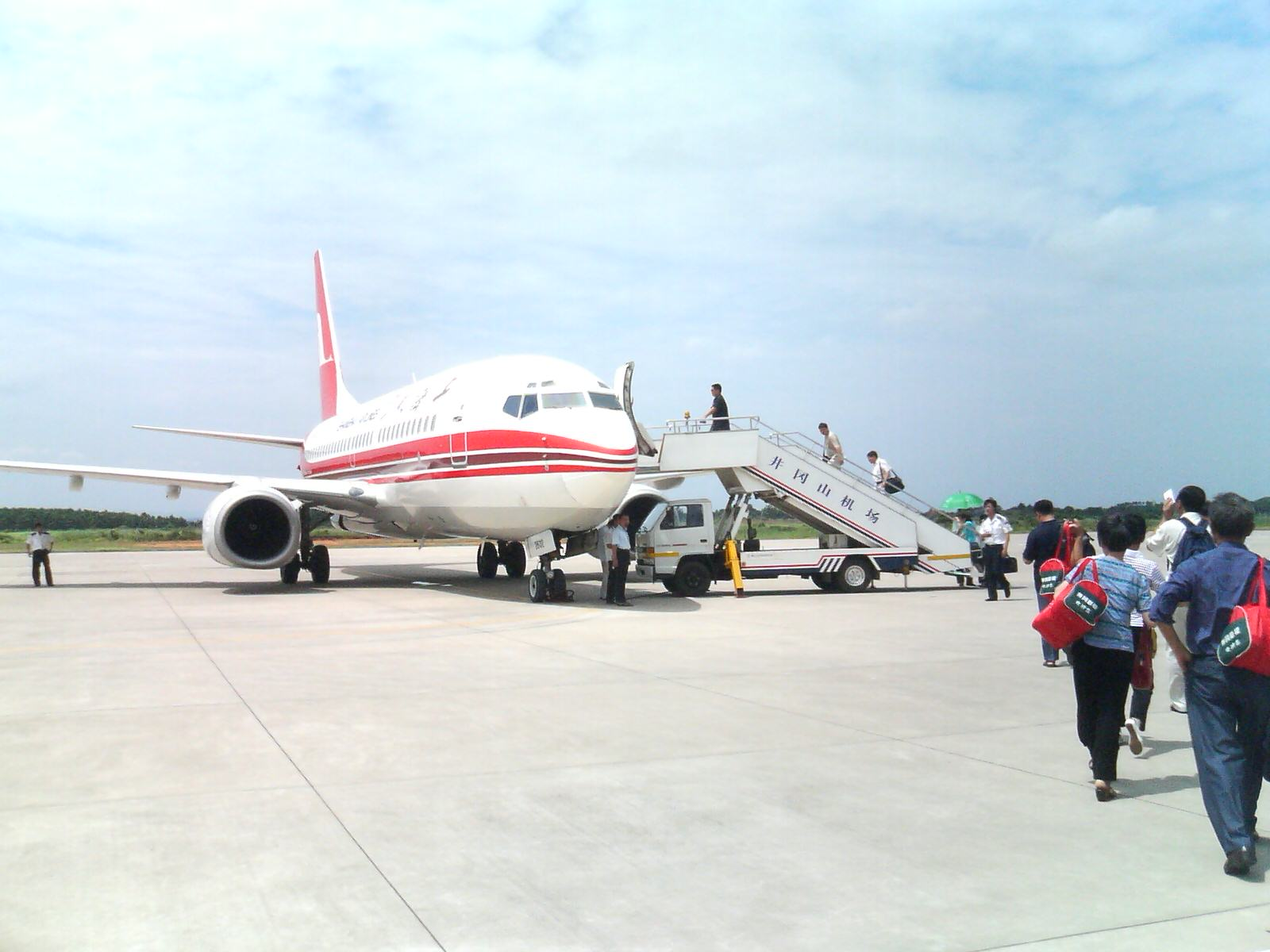
- IATA: JGS; ICAO: ZSGS

Summary
- Airport type: Public
- Owner: Ji'an City
- Operator: Jiangxi Airport Corporation
- Serves: Ji'an, Jiangxi, China
- Location: Taihe County
- Elevation AMSL: 86 m (282 ft)
- Coordinates: 26°51′27″N 114°44′14″E
- Website: www.jajgsairport.com

Map
- Location of airport in Jiangxi

Runways
Direction	Length		Surface
Direction	m	ft	Surface
08/26	2,600	8,530	Concrete

Statistics (2025)
- Passengers: 722,828
- Aircraft movements: 7,998
- Cargo (metric tons): 507.6
- Source: List of the busiest airports in the People's Republic of China

Ji'an Jinggangshan Airport
- Simplified Chinese: 吉安井冈山机场
- Traditional Chinese: 吉安井岡山機場
Transcriptions
Standard Mandarin
- Hanyu Pinyin: Jí'ān Jǐnggāngshān Jīchǎng

Ji'an Jinggangshan Airport (IATA: JGS, ICAO: ZSGS), also known as Jinggangshan Airport, is an airport serving the city of Ji'an in Jiangxi province, China.

The airport is located in Taihe County which is under the administration of Ji'an, 30 kilometres (19 mi) from the urban area of Ji'an.

== History ==
Jinggangshan Airport was originally a military airport (Taihe Air Force Airport), built in 1975. On October 19, 2002, the civilian portion of the airport was named Jinggangshan Airport, and an expansion project was carried out, which was completed on May 18, 2004.

In October 2004, Jinggangshan Airport suspended operations for runway expansion and renovation. The project was completed in March 2005, and the airport reopened on May 22, 2005.

On June 15, 2016, the second phase of the airport expansion project commenced. On September 19, 2019, the new terminal officially began operation. The airport was expanded to accommodate 1 million passengers annually. After the expansion, the apron and taxiway area increased to 29,800 square meters, with 9 aircraft stands. The total area of the expanded terminal building was 13,640 square meters.

On December 12, 2024, the Civil Aviation Administration of China approved the renaming of Jinggangshan Airport to Ji'an Jinggangshan Airport.

== Facilities ==
The airport has one runway which is 2,600 metres (8,530 ft) long.

== Airlines and destinations ==
Airlines	Destinations
Air Chang'an	Xi'an
Air China	Beijing–Capital
Chengdu Airlines	Chengdu–Tianfu, Xiamen
China Eastern Airlines	Kunming, Nanjing, Nanning, Shanghai–Pudong
Shanghai Airlines	Haikou, Shanghai–Hongqiao
Spring Airlines	Chongqing, Ningbo

== See also ==
- List of airports in China
