= Dongting Lake Bridge (rail) =

- Coordinates: 29°25′32″N 113°8′17″E
- Carries: Haoji Railway
- Crosses: Dongting Lake

Characteristics
- Total length: 10,444 m (34,265 ft)

Rail characteristics
- No. of tracks: 2

History
- Opened: 28 September 2019

Location
- Interactive map of Dongting Lake Bridge

Dongting Lake Bridge is a bridge in China which carries the Haoji Railway across Dongting Lake. The bridge was opened with the Haoji Railway on 28 September 2019.

The bridge is 10,444 metres (34,265 feet) long in total. The combined cable-stayed truss section is 1,290 metres (4,230 feet) long. It has a line speed limit of 120 kilometres per hour (75 miles per hour).
