= Denglong Township, Jiangxi =

Township in Jiangxi, China

Denglong Township 登龙乡
- Township
- Location in Jiangxi Denglong Township (China)
- Coordinates: 27°0′42″N 114°45′6″E
- Country: People's Republic of China
- Province: Jiangxi
- Prefecture-level city: Ji'an
- County: Ji'an County
- Time zone: UTC+8 (China Standard)

Denglong Township (simplified Chinese: 登龙乡; traditional Chinese: 登龍鄉; pinyin: Dēnglóng Xiāng) is a township under the administration of Ji'an County, Jiangxi, China. As of 2020, it administers Longgang Residential Community (龙冈社区) and the following 15 villages:

- Longgang Village (龙冈村)
- Tianxin Village (田心村)
- Pantang Village (泮塘村)
- Guojia Village (郭家村)
- Miaoqian Village (庙前村)
- Tangbian Village (塘边村)
- Dongtou Village (栋头村)
- Xiangkou Village (巷口村)
- Qingjiang Village (清江村)
- Langshi Village (朗石村)
- Gaoyuan Village (高源村)
- Sitang Village (泗塘村)
- Mutang Village (牡塘村)
- Huangpi Village (黄陂村)
- Qingshan Village (青山村)

== See also ==
- List of township-level divisions of Jiangxi
