= Ji'an County =

Coordinates: 27°01′37″N 114°38′10″E

Ji'an County 吉安县
- County
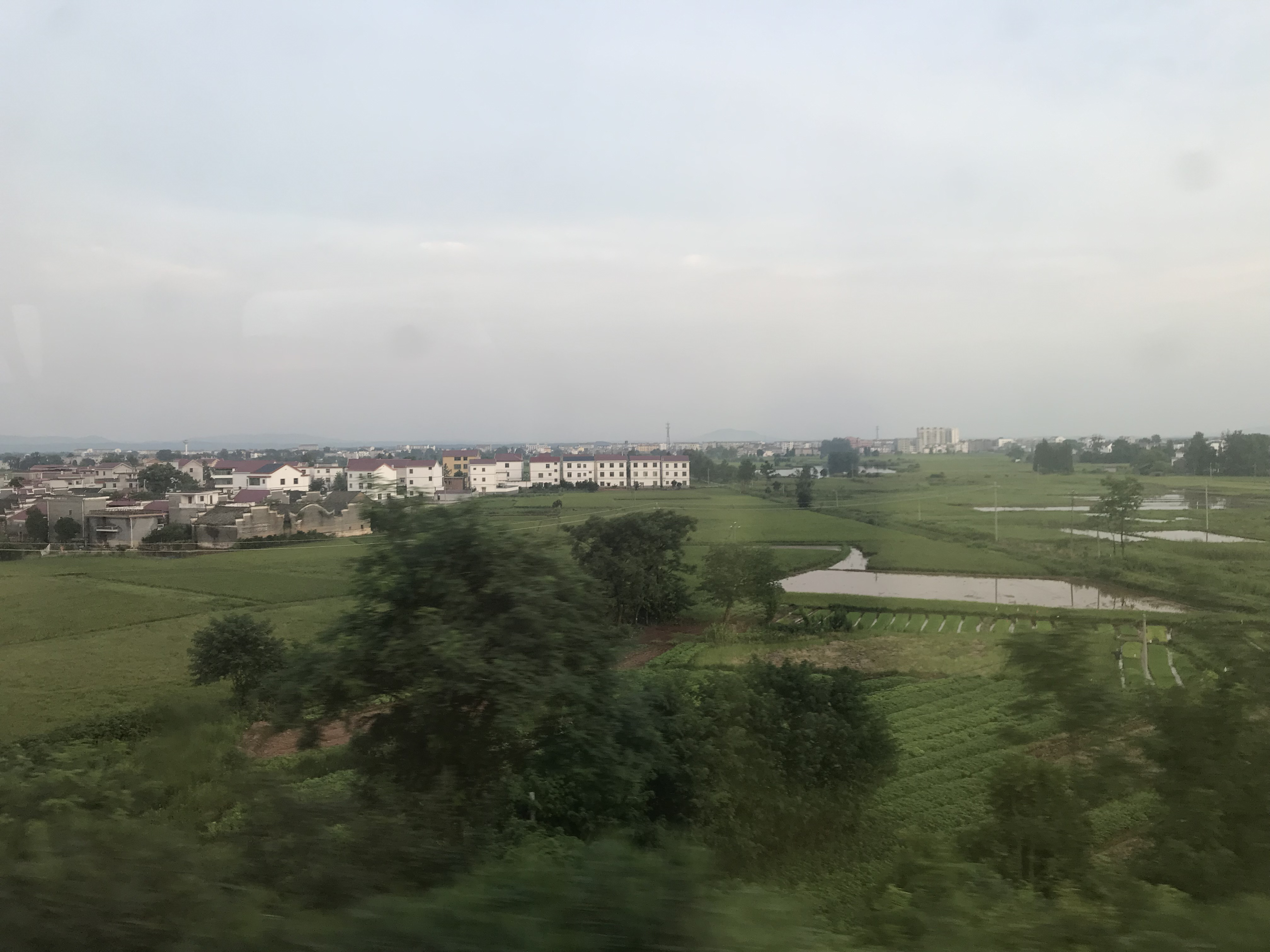
- Yongyang Town

- Location of Ji'an County (red) within Ji'an City (gold) and Jiangxi
- Country: People's Republic of China
- Province: Jiangxi
- Prefecture-level city: Ji'an

Area
  - Total: 2,117 km^{2} (817 sq mi)

Population (household registration in 2018)
  - Total: 509,000
  - Density: 240/km^{2} (623/sq mi)
- Time zone: UTC+8 (China Standard)
- Postal code: 343100

Ji'an County (simplified Chinese: 吉安县; traditional Chinese: 吉安縣; pinyin: Jí'ān Xiàn) is a county of west-central Jiangxi province, China. It is under the jurisdiction of the prefecture-level city of Ji'an.

== Administrative divisions ==
In the present, Ji'an County has 1 subdistrict, 12 towns and 7 townships.

1 subdistrict

- Gaoxin (高新街道)

12 towns

- Dunhou (敦厚镇)
- Yongyang (永阳镇)
- Tianhe (天河镇)
- Hengjiang (横江镇)
- Gujiang (固江镇)
- Wanfu (万福镇)
- Yonghe (永和镇)
- Tongping (桐坪镇)
- Fenghuang (凤凰镇)
- Youtian (油田镇)
- Aocheng (敖城镇)
- Meitang (梅塘镇)

7 townships

- Beiyuan (北源乡)
- Dachong (大冲乡)
- Litian (浬田乡)
- Denglong (登龙乡)
- Antang (安塘乡)
- Guantian (官田乡)
- Zhiyang (指阳乡)

== Demographics ==
The population of the county was 554,693 in 1999.
