= Xiajiang County =

Xiajiang County 峡江县 Siakiang
- County
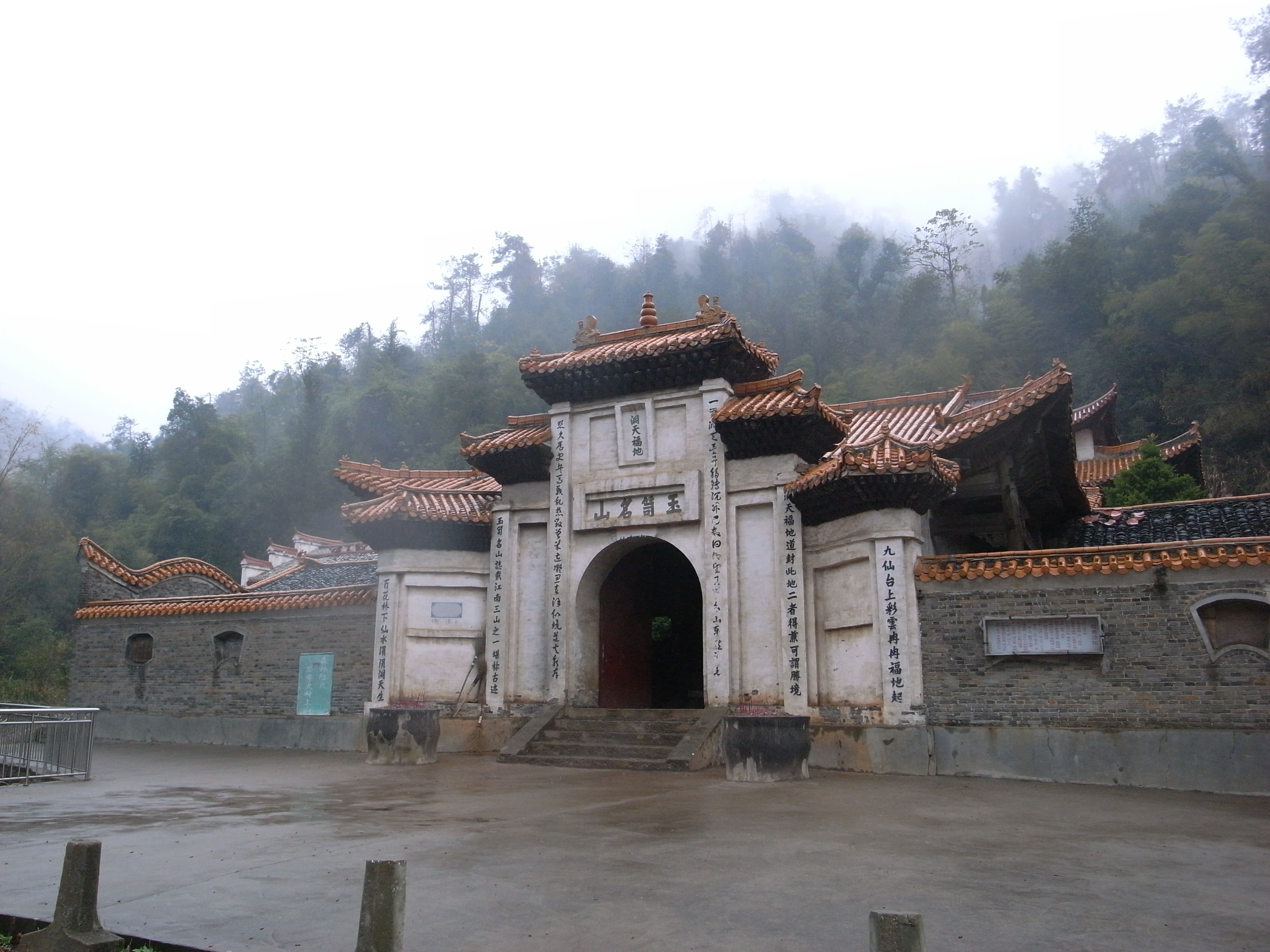

- Location of Xiajiang County (red) within Ji'an City (gold) and Jiangxi
- Coordinates: 27°37′N 115°11′E
- Country: People's Republic of China
- Province: Jiangxi
- Prefecture-level city: Ji'an
- Time zone: UTC+8 (China Standard)
- Website: www.xiajiang.gov.cn

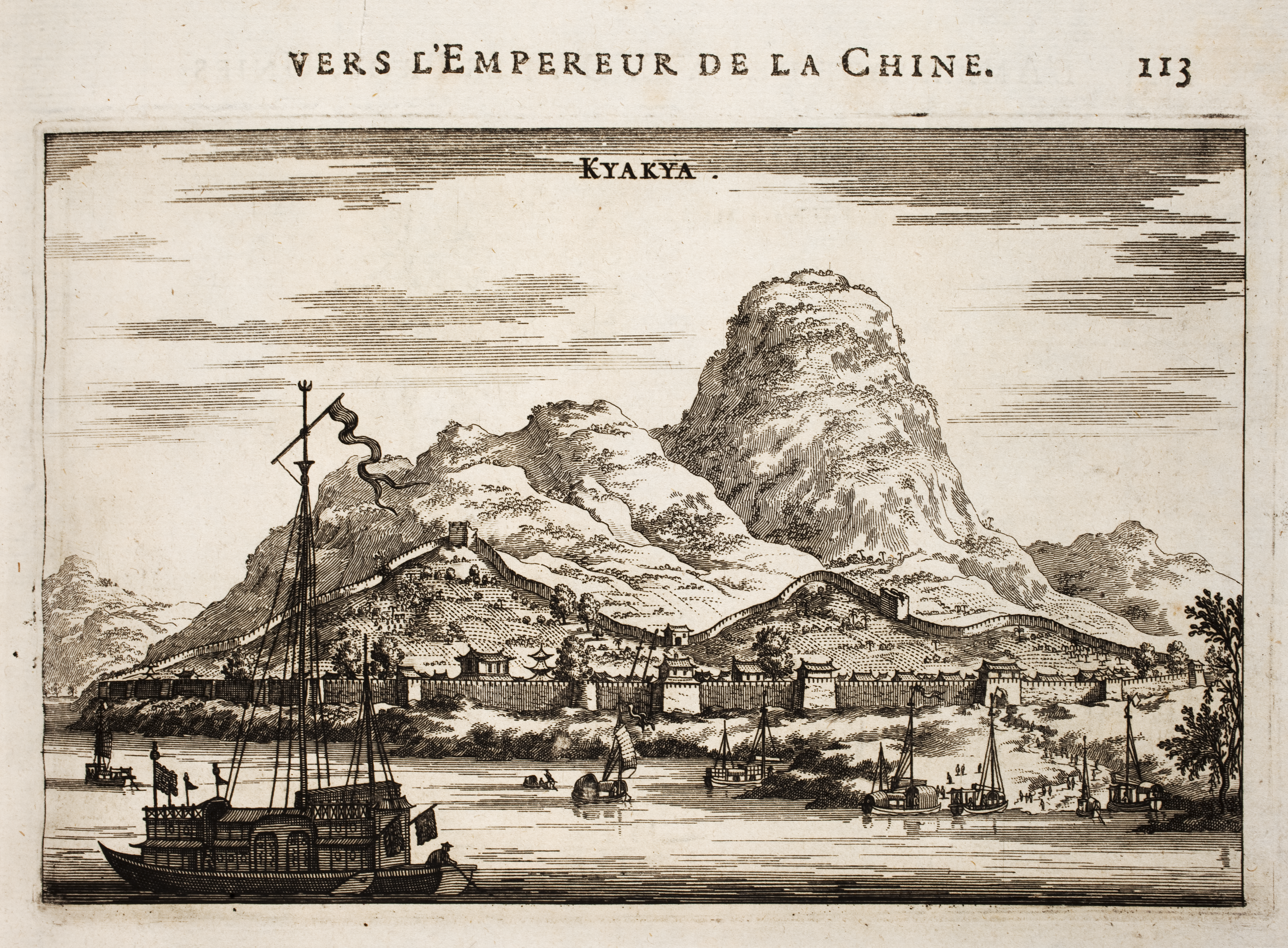
"Kyakya" (Xiajiang, Ji'an, Jiangxi, China). Nieuhof: Ambassade vers la Chine, 1665

Xiajiang County (simplified Chinese: 峡江县; traditional Chinese: 峽江縣; pinyin: Xiájiāng Xiàn) is a county of west-central Jiangxi province, People's Republic of China. It is under the jurisdiction of the prefecture-level city of Ji'an.

== Administrative divisions ==
At present, Xiajiang County has 6 towns, 4 townships and 1 Ethnic Township.

6 Towns

- Shuibian (水边镇)
- Mabu (马埠镇)
- Baqiu (巴邱镇)
- Renhe (仁和镇)
- Yanxi (砚溪镇)
- Luotian (罗田镇)

4 Townships

- Tonglin (桐林乡)
- Fumin (福民乡)
- Geping (戈坪乡)
- Jinjiang (金江乡)

1 Ethnic Township

- Jinping Ethnic Township (金坪民族乡)

== Demographics ==
The population of the district was 155,993 in 1999.

== Climate ==
Climate data for Xiajiang, elevation 105 m (344 ft), (1991–2020 normals, extremes 1981–2010)
| Month | Jan | Feb | Mar | Apr | May | Jun | Jul | Aug | Sep | Oct | Nov | Dec | Year |
|---|---|---|---|---|---|---|---|---|---|---|---|---|---|
| Record high °C (°F) | 26.2 (79.2) | 30.3 (86.5) | 32.4 (90.3) | 35.4 (95.7) | 35.9 (96.6) | 38.1 (100.6) | 40.3 (104.5) | 40.4 (104.7) | 38.1 (100.6) | 35.7 (96.3) | 33.4 (92.1) | 25.1 (77.2) | 40.4 (104.7) |
| Mean daily maximum °C (°F) | 9.8 (49.6) | 12.9 (55.2) | 16.9 (62.4) | 23.5 (74.3) | 27.8 (82.0) | 30.5 (86.9) | 34.2 (93.6) | 33.5 (92.3) | 29.6 (85.3) | 24.7 (76.5) | 18.8 (65.8) | 12.6 (54.7) | 22.9 (73.2) |
| Daily mean °C (°F) | 5.8 (42.4) | 8.4 (47.1) | 12.3 (54.1) | 18.5 (65.3) | 22.9 (73.2) | 26.1 (79.0) | 29.2 (84.6) | 28.4 (83.1) | 24.6 (76.3) | 19.1 (66.4) | 13.3 (55.9) | 7.6 (45.7) | 18.0 (64.4) |
| Mean daily minimum °C (°F) | 2.9 (37.2) | 5.3 (41.5) | 9.0 (48.2) | 14.8 (58.6) | 19.3 (66.7) | 22.8 (73.0) | 25.4 (77.7) | 24.8 (76.6) | 20.9 (69.6) | 15.2 (59.4) | 9.5 (49.1) | 4.0 (39.2) | 14.5 (58.1) |
| Record low °C (°F) | −6.2 (20.8) | −5.7 (21.7) | −4.0 (24.8) | 0.8 (33.4) | 9.6 (49.3) | 13.0 (55.4) | 17.8 (64.0) | 19.1 (66.4) | 12.5 (54.5) | 2.6 (36.7) | −2.5 (27.5) | −9.1 (15.6) | −9.1 (15.6) |
| Average precipitation mm (inches) | 81.4 (3.20) | 99.9 (3.93) | 199.2 (7.84) | 212.6 (8.37) | 230.8 (9.09) | 260.8 (10.27) | 159.5 (6.28) | 123.1 (4.85) | 81.7 (3.22) | 57.8 (2.28) | 85.2 (3.35) | 64.5 (2.54) | 1,656.5 (65.22) |
| Average precipitation days (≥ 0.1 mm) | 14.4 | 14.3 | 18.8 | 18.0 | 17.5 | 15.7 | 11.1 | 11.7 | 8.3 | 8.2 | 10.3 | 10.9 | 159.2 |
| Average snowy days | 1.8 | 1.1 | 0.2 | 0 | 0 | 0 | 0 | 0 | 0 | 0 | 0 | 0.7 | 3.8 |
| Average relative humidity (%) | 84 | 83 | 85 | 82 | 83 | 84 | 76 | 80 | 82 | 80 | 82 | 81 | 82 |
| Mean monthly sunshine hours | 66.9 | 70.7 | 75.6 | 102.7 | 127.7 | 128.6 | 224.9 | 203.1 | 157.5 | 144.6 | 115.8 | 105.7 | 1,523.8 |
| Percentage possible sunshine | 20 | 22 | 20 | 27 | 31 | 31 | 53 | 50 | 43 | 41 | 36 | 33 | 34 |
Source: China Meteorological Administration
