= Nanchang–Ganzhou high-speed railway =

High-speed railway line in China

Nanchang–Ganzhou high-speed railway 昌赣客运专线

Overview
- Status: Operational
- Locale: Jiangxi
- Termini: Nanchang; Ganzhou
- Stations: 13

Service
- Type: High-speed rail
- Operator(s): China Railway Nanchang Group

Technical
- Line length: 422 km (262 mi)
- Track gauge: 1,435 mm (4 ft 8 1/2 in) standard gauge
- Minimum radius: 7,000 m (23,000 ft)
- Operating speed: 350 km/h (217 mph)
- Maximum incline: 2.0%

The Nanchang–Ganzhou high-speed railway, or Changgan Passenger Dedicated Line (simplified Chinese: 昌赣客运专线; traditional Chinese: 昌贛客運專線; pinyin: Chāng-Gàn Kèyùn Zhuānxiàn), is a high-speed railway between Nanchang and Ganzhou in Jiangxi province. The southern section of that railway, the Ganzhou–Shenzhen high-speed railway, commenced construction in January 2015. This allows for fast connections from Jiangxi to several coastal cities in Guangdong and Fujian.

Construction work began on December 20, 2014, between Nanchang and Ji'an. The 422-kilometre (262 mi) railway opened in December 2019 with 13 stations built with speeds of up to 350 km/h (217 mph), reducing travel times for Nanchang to Ganzhou from five hours to two hours.
