= Taihe County, Jiangxi =

Taihe County 泰和县 Taiho
- County
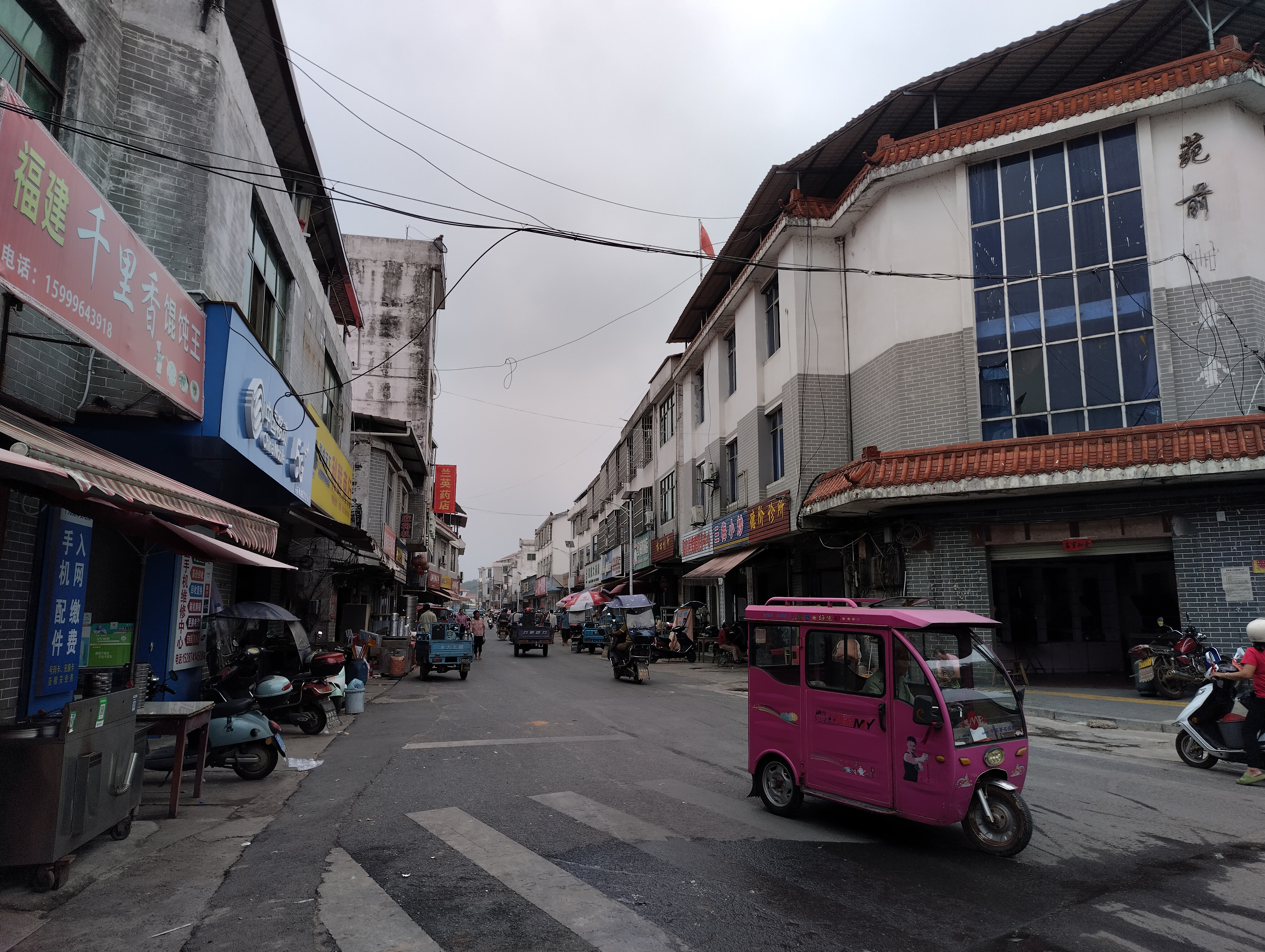
- Yuanqian Town

- Location in Ji'an City (yellow) and Jiangxi province
- Coordinates: 26°47′24″N 114°54′32″E
- Country: People's Republic of China
- Province: Jiangxi
- Prefecture-level city: Ji'an

Area
  - Total: 2,666 km^{2} (1,029 sq mi)
- Elevation: 57 m (187 ft)

Population (2010)
  - Total: 512,225
  - Density: 192.1/km^{2} (497.6/sq mi)
- Time zone: UTC+8 (China Standard)
- Postal code: 343700
- Area code: 0796
- GDP (RMB): 4.692 billion
- Website: www.jxth.gov.cn

Taihe County (simplified Chinese: 泰和县; traditional Chinese: 泰和縣; pinyin: Tàihé Xiàn) is a county of southwest Jiangxi province, People's Republic of China, situated on the west (left) bank of the Gan River. It is under the jurisdiction of the prefecture-level city of Ji'an, 37 kilometres (23 mi) to the north-northeast.

Its area is almost the size of that of Rhode Island.

== Administrative divisions ==
Nowadays, Taihe County consists of 16 towns and 6 townships.

16 towns

- Chengjiang (澄江镇)
- Bixi (碧溪镇)
- Qiaotou (桥头镇)
- Heshi (禾市镇)
- Luoxi (螺溪镇)
- Suxi (马市镇
- Mashi (馬市镇)
- Tangzhou (塘洲镇)
- Guanchao (冠朝镇)
- Shacun (沙村镇)
- Laoyingpan (老营盘镇)
- Xiaolong (小龙镇)
- Guanxi (灌溪镇)
- Yuanqian (苑前镇)
- Wanhe (万合镇)
- Yanxi (沿溪镇)

6 townships

- Shishan (石山乡)
- Nanxi (南溪乡)
- Shangmo (上模乡)
- Shuicha (水槎乡)
- Shangyi (上圯乡)
- Zhonglong (中龙乡)

== History ==
=== Ancient Times ===
According to contemporary archeological finds, Taihe County's history dates back to the Western Zhou period. During the Spring and Autumn periods, as well as the Warring States era, present-day Taihe County was controlled by the States of Wu, Yue, and Chu in turn. During the Qin dynasty, it belonged to Jiujiang Commandery. During the Qin dynasty, Luling County was founded in the region. Its jurisdiction covered most of today's Ji'an and Ganzhou regions, with the county seat located by the Hesui River within the present-day Taihe County. During the Western Han Dynasty, Wang Mang renamed it Hengting County. Luling County reclaimed it during the start of the Eastern Han period. In the first year of Xingping (194 AD), Xichang County was founded. Sun Ce detached Luling Commandery from Yuzhang Commandery and made Xichang County the capital of Luling Commandery. The county seat of Xichang was situated west of the current county seat. In the fifth year of Jiahe (236 AD) under Eastern Wu, Luling Commandery was divided, and Luling South Commandery Commandant was appointed. In the second year of Baoding (267 AD), Luling Commandery was partitioned again, and Ancheng Commandery (now Anfu County) was founded. During the Western Jin dynasty's Taikang era, the commandery seat was moved to Shiyang County, located about twenty li northeast of today's Jishui County.

=== Medieval Times ===
During the Wei, Jin, and Southern and Northern Dynasties period, large-scale migrations from the north occurred due to wars, bringing with them more advanced farming techniques from the north. This led to continuous development of agricultural production in the Gan River valley of the Ji-Tai Basin, and Taihe gradually became an important agricultural region. In the tenth year of the Sui emperor Kaihuang (590 AD), Dongchang, Suixing, and Yongxin Counties were merged into Xichang County, which was renamed Anfeng County. The following year (591 AD), due to the area's fertile land, it was renamed Taihe County. In the fifth year of Tang emperor Wude (622 AD), Taihe was elevated to Nanping Prefecture, but three years later, the prefecture was abolished, and the name was reverted to Taihe County (with "Tai" changed to "Tai").

=== Early Modern Times ===
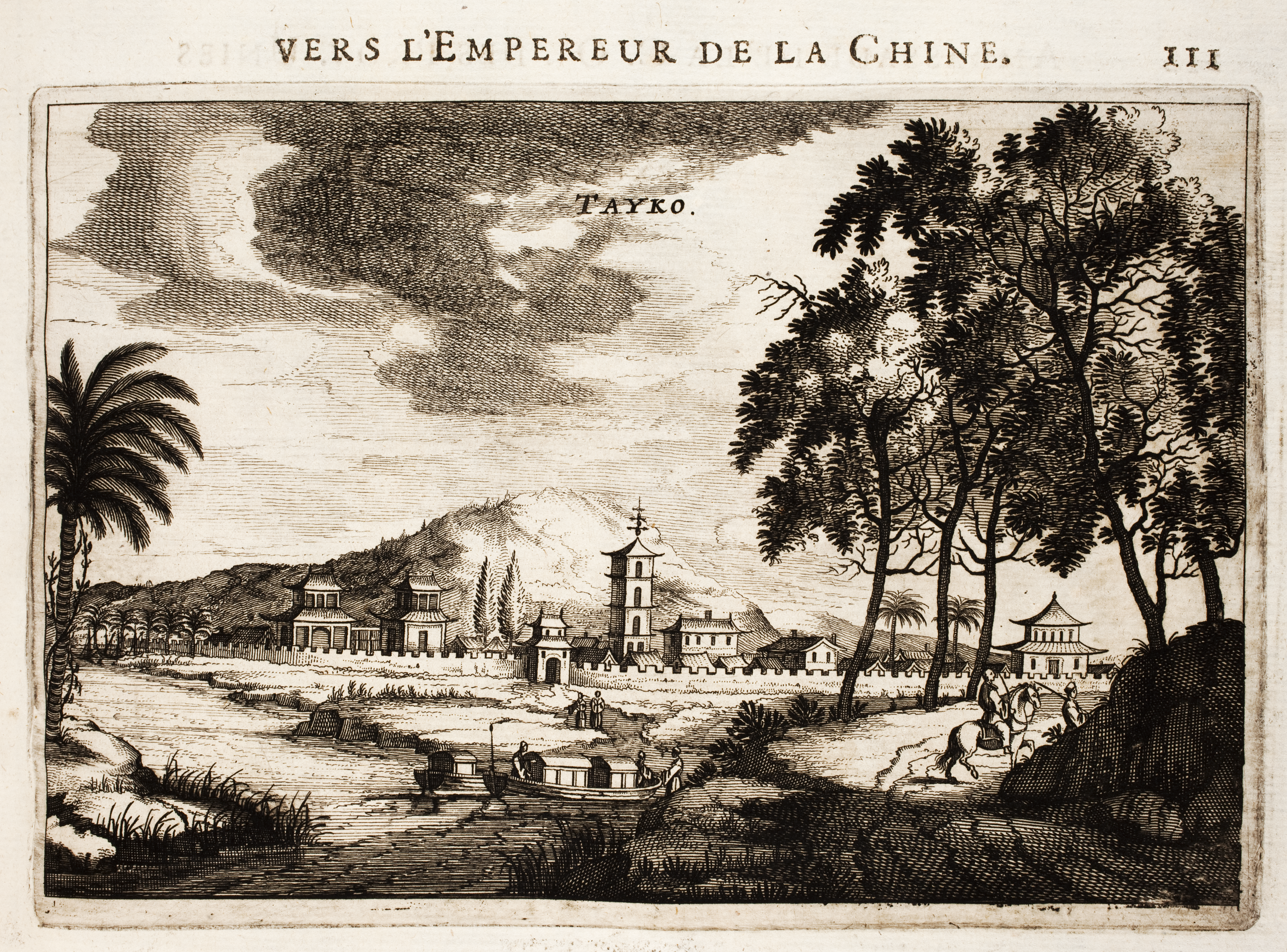
Scenery of Taihe County, drawn by Dutchman Johann Nieuhof in 1665

From the Tang dynasty to the Five Dynasties and Ten Kingdoms period, the economy of the Ji-Tai Basin continued to develop. The hilly and mountainous areas on both sides of the basin were gradually developed as well, and the population increased. Taihe County's jurisdiction was gradually divided, first separating Yongxin County and Suichuan County from Taihe, and later separating Wanan County from Suichuan and Taihe. By the mid-Northern Song dynasty, the county's borders had shrunk to nearly their present-day size, with few significant changes afterward. In the first year of the Yuan emperor Yuanzhen (1294 AD), Taihe was elevated to the status of a prefecture. In the second year of the Ming emperor Hongwu (1369 AD), Taihe Prefecture was abolished and reverted to Taihe County (changing "Tai" back to "Tai").

== Climate ==
Climate data for Taihe, elevation 103 m (338 ft), (1991–2020 normals, extremes 1981–2010)
Month	Jan	Feb	Mar	Apr	May	Jun	Jul	Aug	Sep	Oct	Nov	Dec	Year
Record high °C (°F)	26.5 (79.7)	31.0 (87.8)	33.2 (91.8)	36.2 (97.2)	36.8 (98.2)	38.3 (100.9)	41.4 (106.5)	41.5 (106.7)	38.5 (101.3)	36.9 (98.4)	33.3 (91.9)	27.4 (81.3)	41.5 (106.7)
Mean daily maximum °C (°F)	10.9 (51.6)	14.1 (57.4)	17.7 (63.9)	24.3 (75.7)	28.6 (83.5)	31.4 (88.5)	34.8 (94.6)	34.2 (93.6)	30.6 (87.1)	25.7 (78.3)	19.7 (67.5)	13.6 (56.5)	23.8 (74.9)
Daily mean °C (°F)	7.2 (45.0)	9.8 (49.6)	13.4 (56.1)	19.5 (67.1)	24.0 (75.2)	27.0 (80.6)	29.8 (85.6)	29.1 (84.4)	25.8 (78.4)	20.8 (69.4)	14.9 (58.8)	9.2 (48.6)	19.2 (66.6)
Mean daily minimum °C (°F)	4.6 (40.3)	6.9 (44.4)	10.4 (50.7)	16.2 (61.2)	20.7 (69.3)	24.0 (75.2)	26.2 (79.2)	25.6 (78.1)	22.4 (72.3)	17.2 (63.0)	11.5 (52.7)	6.0 (42.8)	16.0 (60.8)
Record low °C (°F)	−4.1 (24.6)	−2.8 (27.0)	−1.2 (29.8)	4.0 (39.2)	11.1 (52.0)	14.9 (58.8)	19.0 (66.2)	20.2 (68.4)	15.0 (59.0)	4.0 (39.2)	0.3 (32.5)	−6.0 (21.2)	−6.0 (21.2)
Average precipitation mm (inches)	70.4 (2.77)	84.1 (3.31)	159.1 (6.26)	173.9 (6.85)	211.4 (8.32)	254.4 (10.02)	122.0 (4.80)	133.0 (5.24)	69.9 (2.75)	58.8 (2.31)	74.1 (2.92)	52.5 (2.07)	1,463.6 (57.62)
Average precipitation days (≥ 0.1 mm)	13.3	12.9	18.3	17.7	17.5	15.9	10.9	12.5	9.2	6.9	9.5	10.0	154.6
Average snowy days	2.4	1.3	0.3	0	0	0	0	0	0	0	0	0.6	4.6
Average relative humidity (%)	79	79	81	79	79	80	72	75	76	74	77	76	77
Mean monthly sunshine hours	66.8	70.0	75.6	104.2	123.6	133.5	230.8	203.9	154.7	146.0	114.9	103.4	1,527.4
Percentage possible sunshine	20	22	20	27	30	32	55	51	42	41	36	32	34
Source: China Meteorological Administration

== See also ==
- Ji'an Jinggangshan Airport
