= Ji'an =

Ji'an 吉安市 Kian
- Prefecture-level city
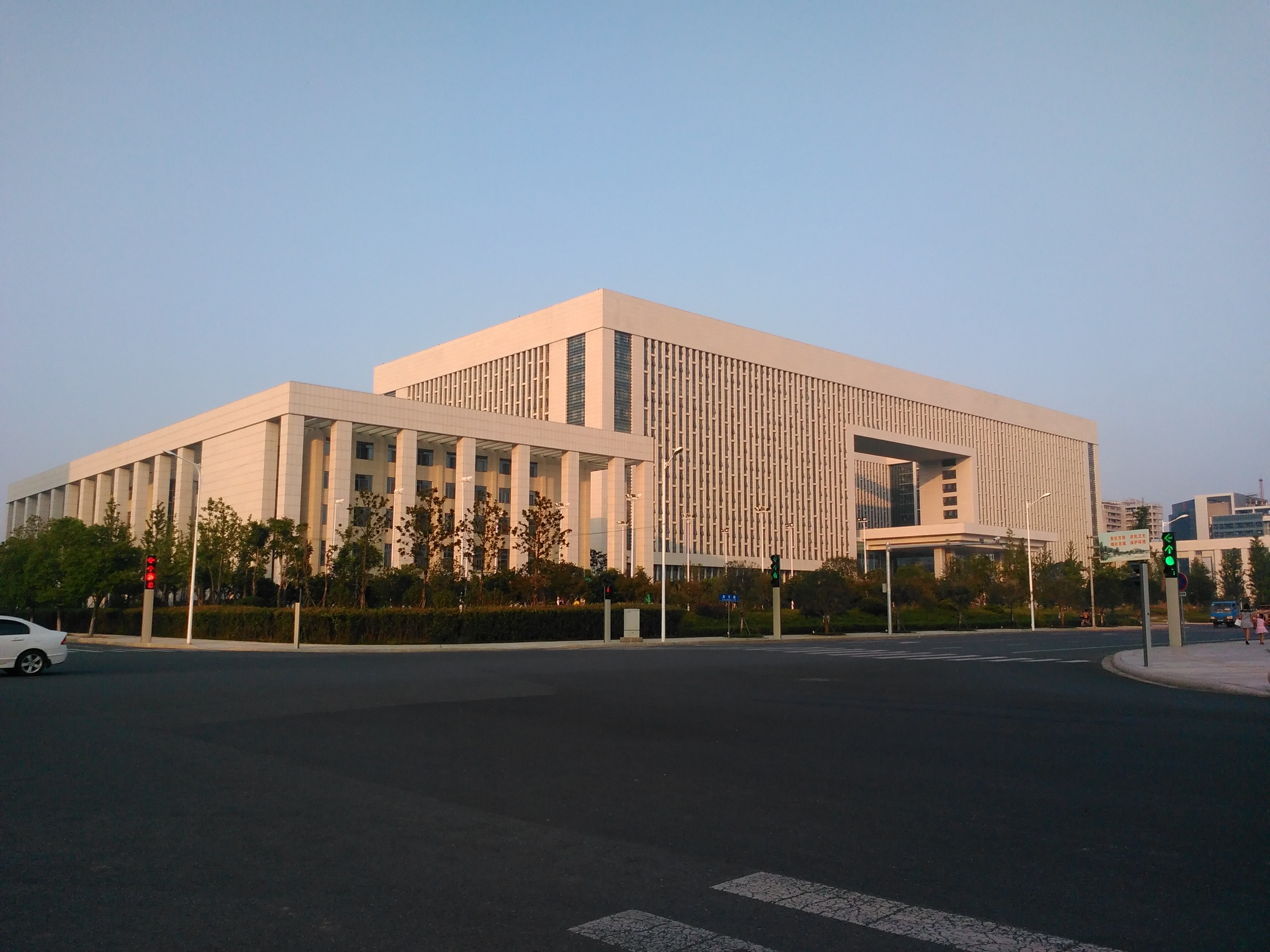
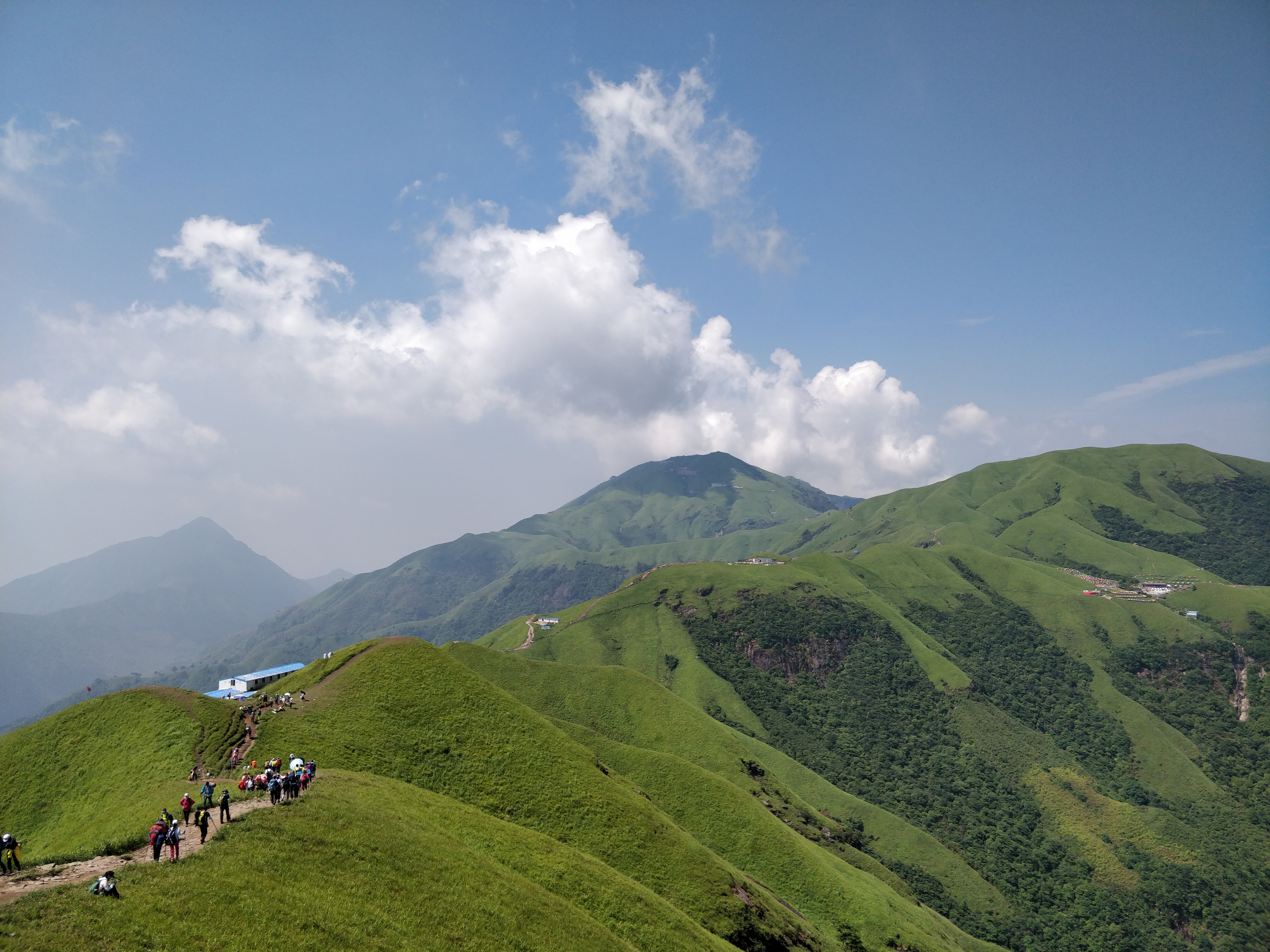
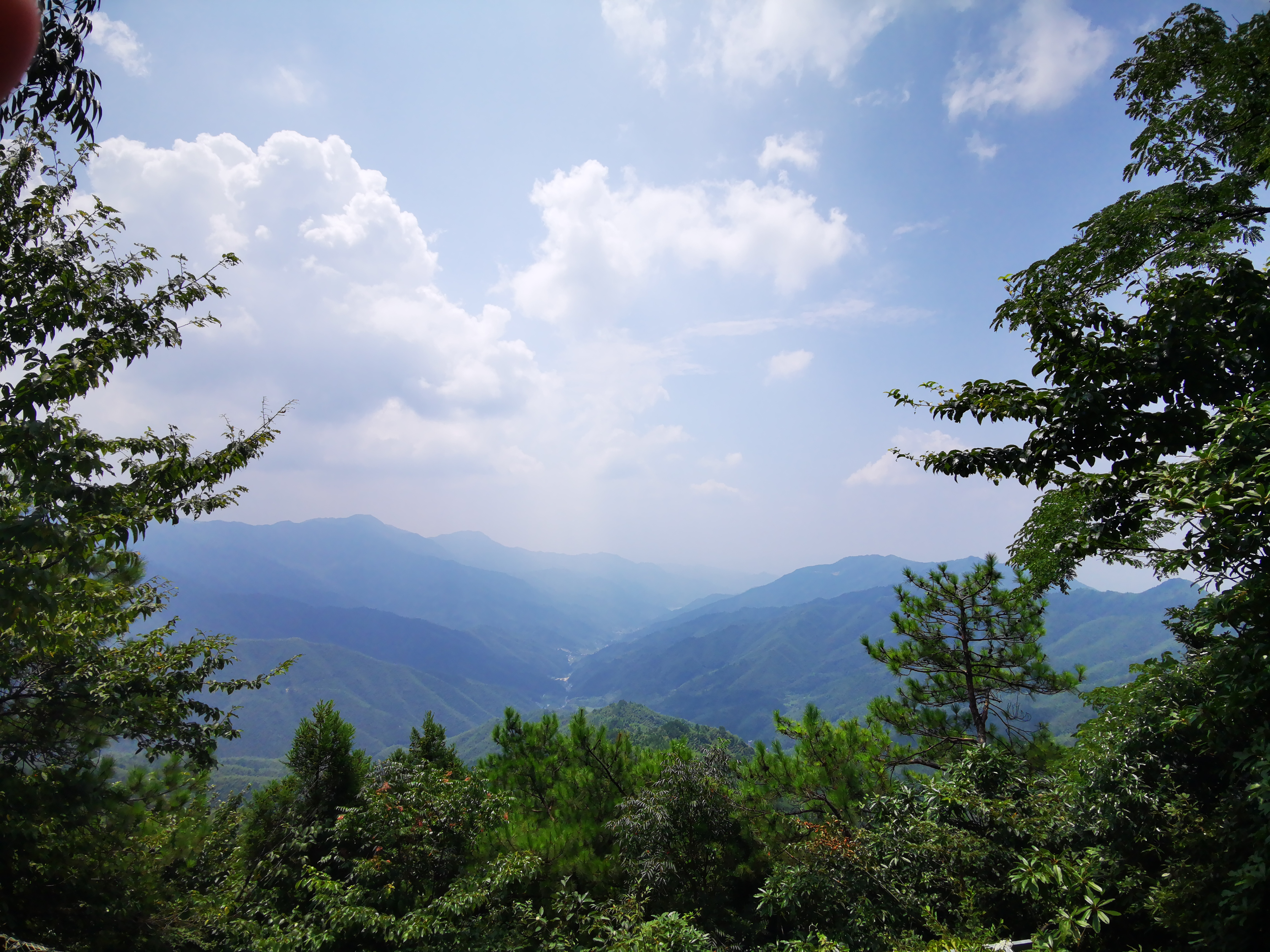
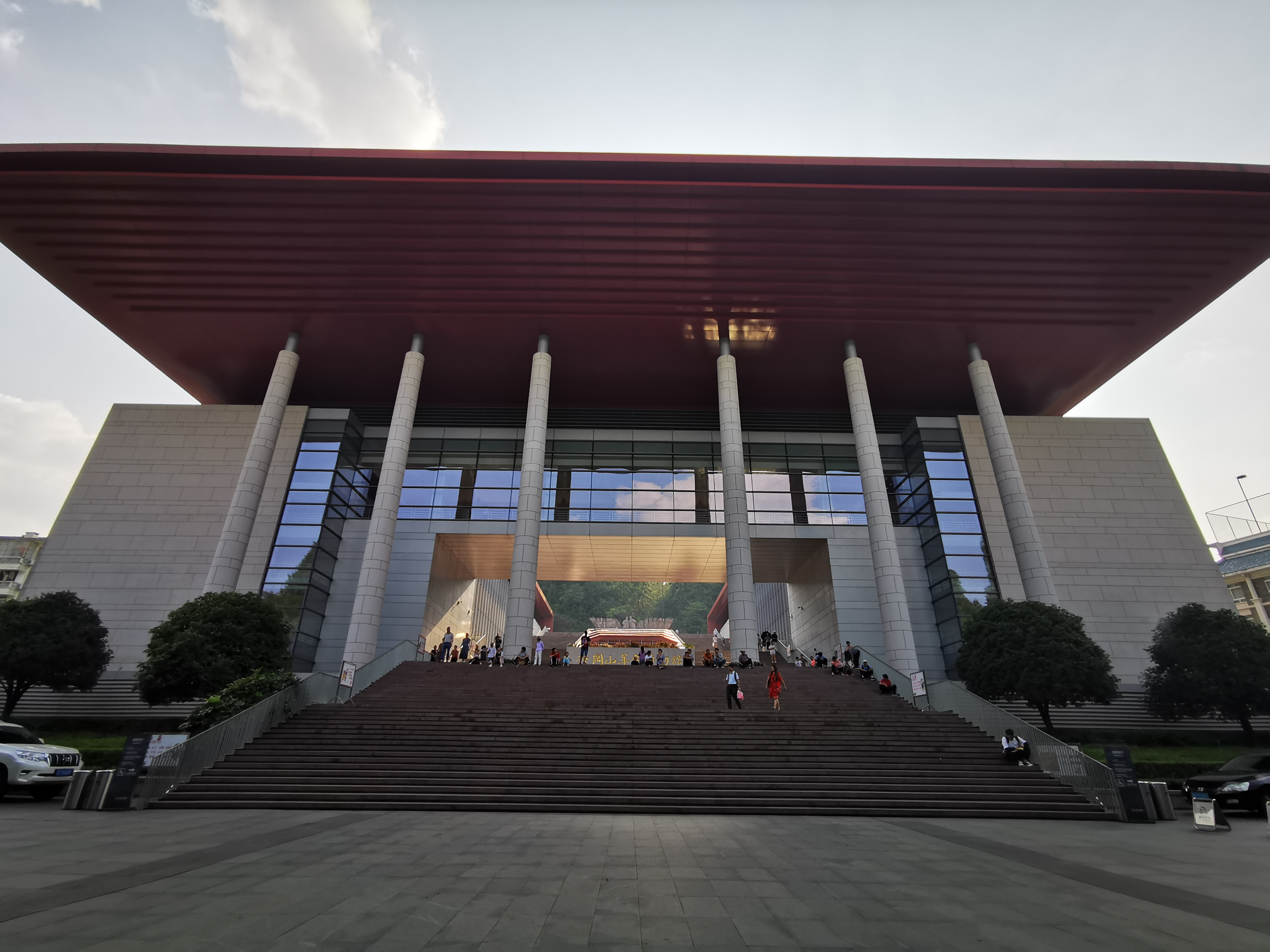
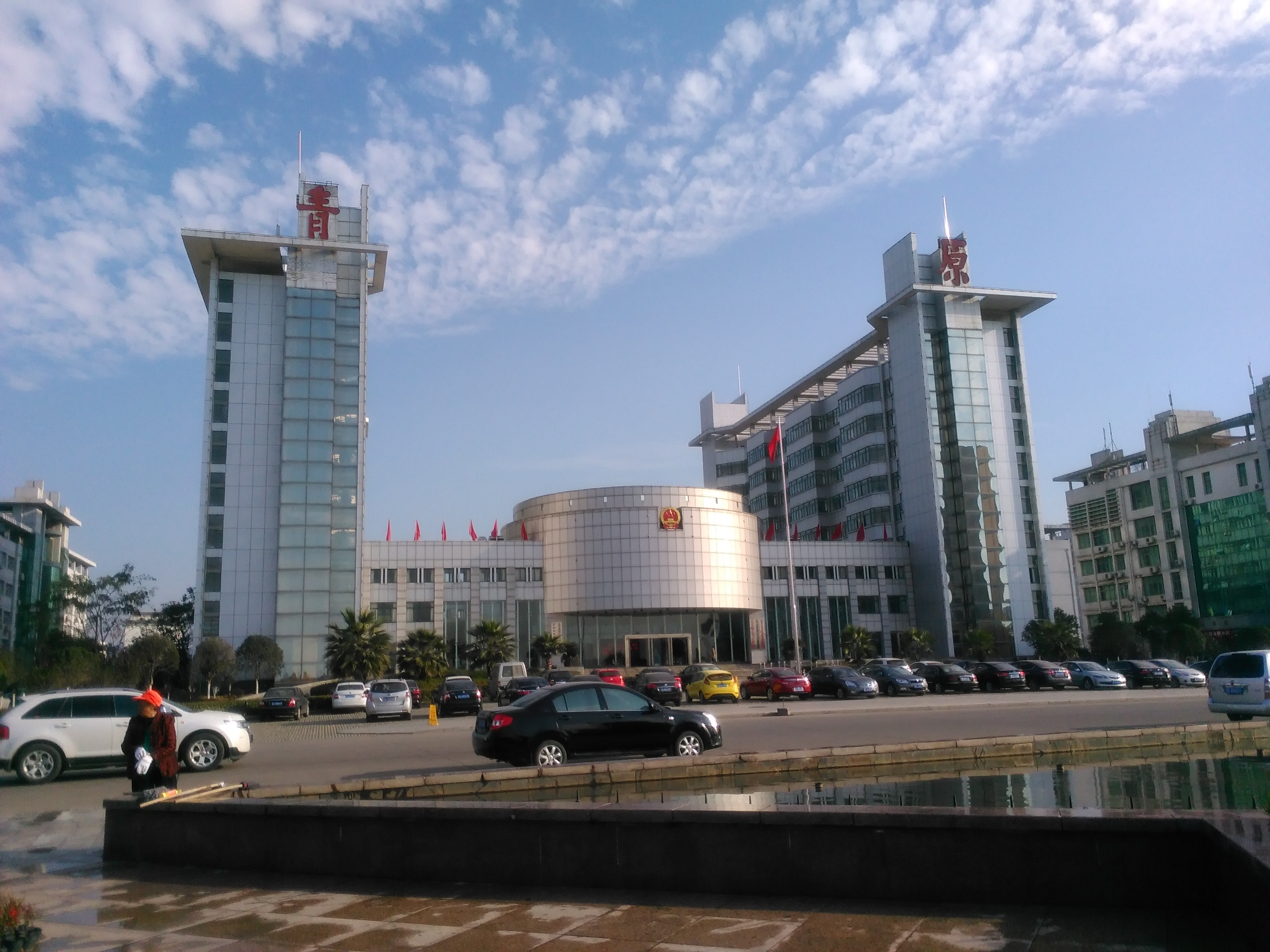
- Top to bottom, left to right: Ji'an city hall, the Wugong Mountains on the border with Pingxiang, the Jinggang Mountains, Jinggangshan Revolution Museum, Qingyuan District Hall

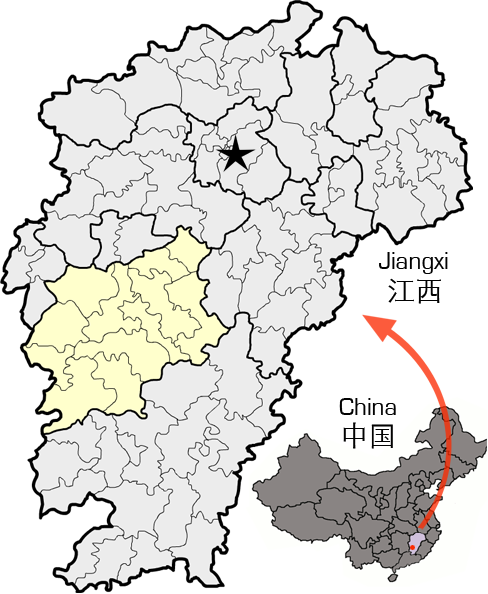
- Location of Ji'an City jurisdiction in Jiangxi
- Coordinates (Ji'an municipal government): 27°05′28″N 114°58′01″E
- Country: People's Republic of China
- Province: Jiangxi

Government
  - CPC Secretary: Wang Ping (王萍)
  - Mayor: Wang Shaoxuan (王少玄)

Area
  - Prefecture-level city: 25,283 km^{2} (9,762 sq mi)
  - Urban: 1,340 km^{2} (520 sq mi)
  - Metro: 1,340 km^{2} (520 sq mi)
- Elevation: 62 m (203 ft)

Population (2020 census)
  - Prefecture-level city: 4,469,176
  - Density: 176.77/km^{2} (457.82/sq mi)
  - Urban: 643,399
  - Urban density: 480/km^{2} (1,240/sq mi)
  - Metro: 643,399
  - Metro density: 480/km^{2} (1,240/sq mi)

GDP
  - Prefecture-level city: CN¥ 132.3 billion US$ 21.3 billion
  - Per capita: CN¥ 27,168; US$ 4,362
- Time zone: UTC+8 (China Standard)
- Postal code: 343000
- Area code: 0796
- ISO 3166 code: CN-JX-08
- Licence plate prefixes: 赣D
- Website: jian.gov.cn

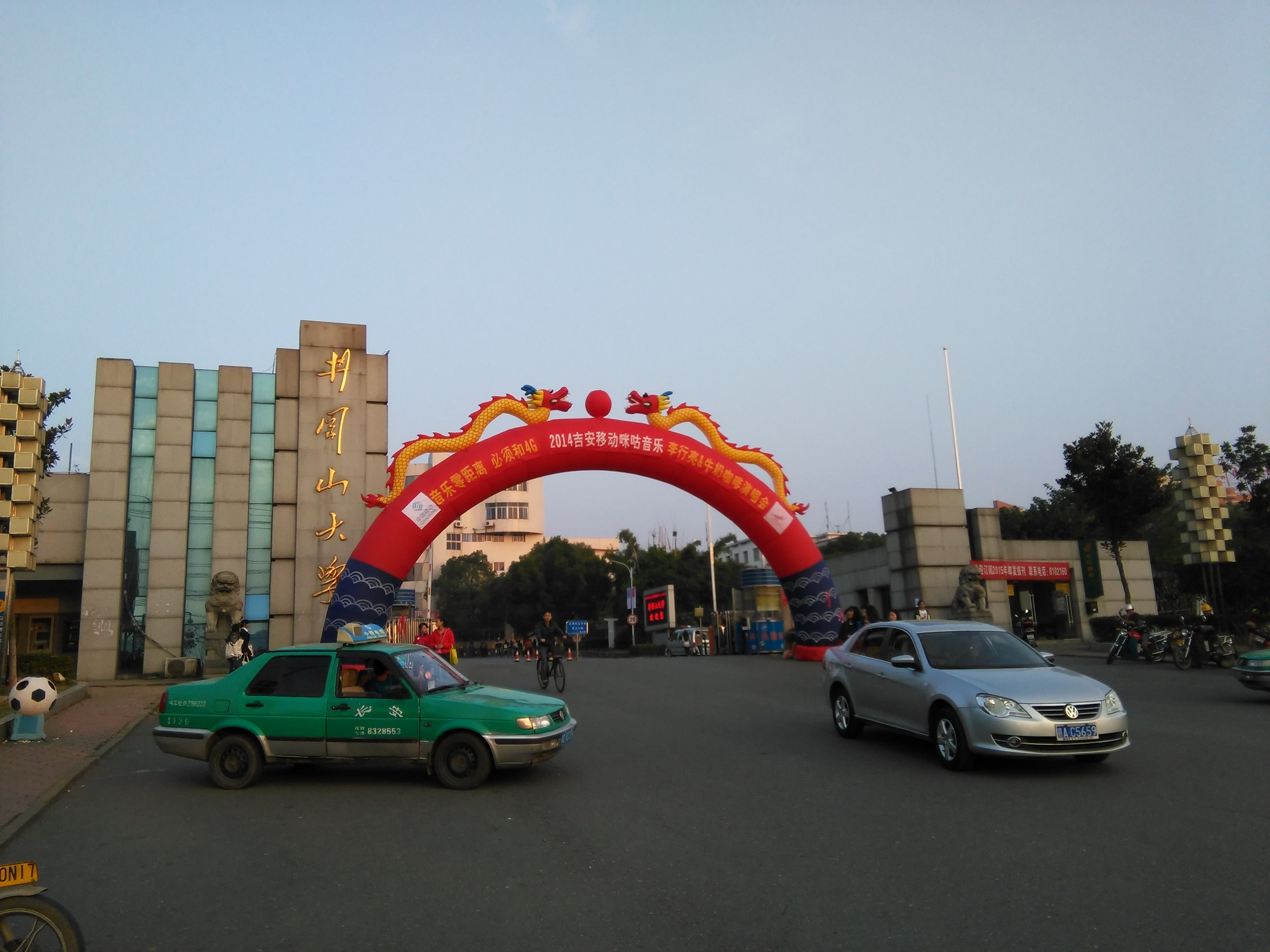
Jinggangshan University school gate

Ji'an (Chinese: 吉安; pinyin: Jí'ān) is a prefecture-level city situated in the central region of Jiangxi province of the People's Republic of China and bordering Hunan province to the west. It has an area of 25,219 km^{2} (9,737 sq mi) and as of the 2020 census, had a population of 4,469,176, of whom 643,399 live in the built-up (or metro) area made of 2 urban districts. Ji'an lies next to the Luoxiao Mountains (罗霄山脉) with the Gan River running through the middle of the city. Local dialects include a form of Gan Chinese (Jicha subgroup, 吉茶片) as well as Hakka Chinese.

Ji'an (吉安) is an abbreviation of its original name "吉泰民安" (pinyin: Jítài Mín'ān). It has also formerly been known as Luling (廬陵) and Jizhou (吉州).

== History ==
In the 26th year of the First Emperor of Qin (211 BC), Luling County was established, which belonged to Jiujiang County, so Ji'an City was called "Luling" in ancient times. Luling in the Han Dynasty belonged to Yuzhang County.

In the Sui Dynasty, Luling County was changed to Jizhou, so Ji'an was also known as "Jizhou".

== Administration ==
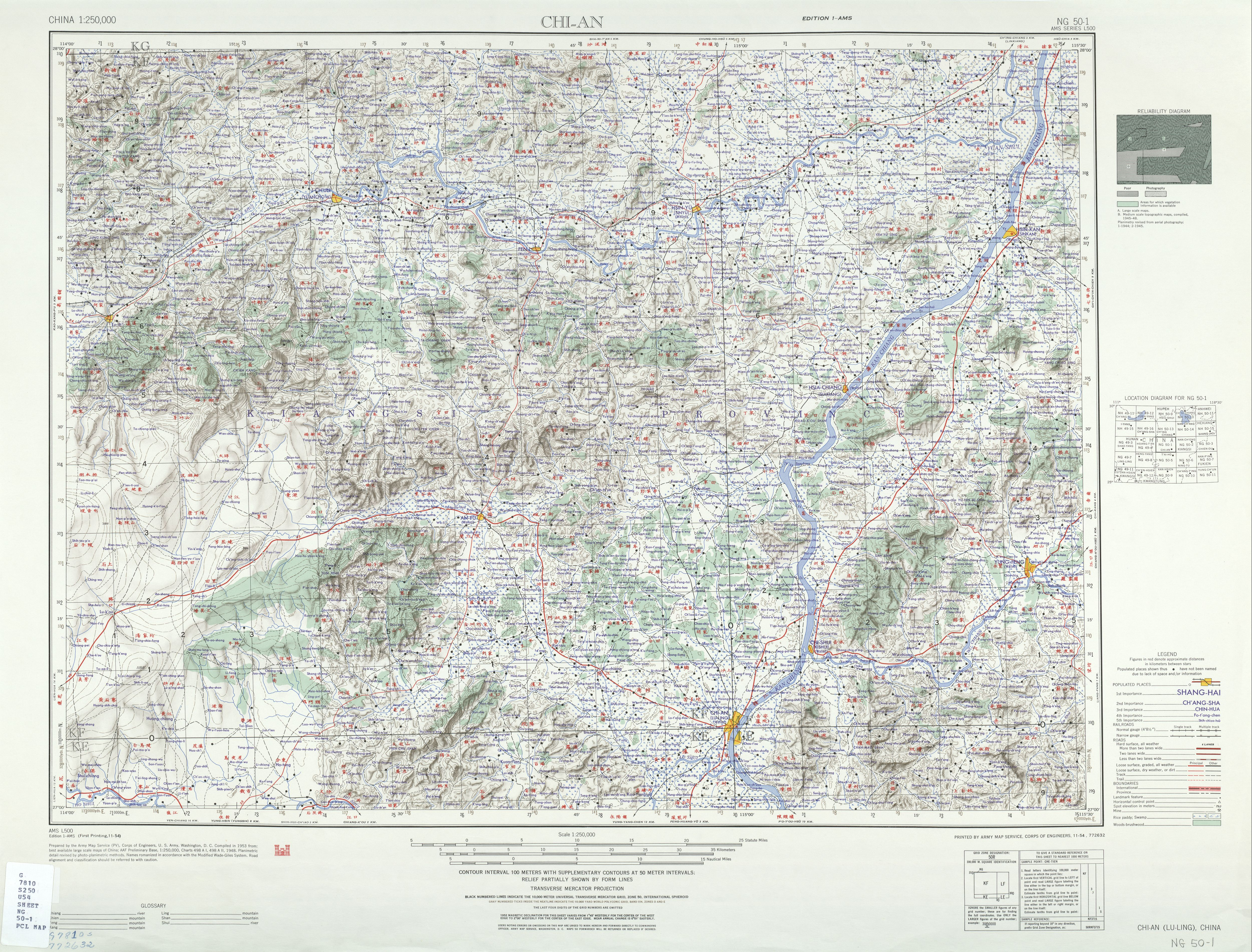
Map including Ji'an (labeled as CHI-AN (LU-LING) (Walled) 吉安 (廬陵)) (AMS, 1953)

The Ji'an municipal region comprises two districts, a county-level city and ten counties.

=== District ===
- Jizhou District (吉州区)
- Qingyuan District (青原区)

=== County-level city ===
- Jinggangshan City (井冈山市)

=== Counties ===
- Ji'an County (吉安县)
- Jishui County (吉水县)
- Yongxin County (永新县)
- Anfu County (安福县)
- Xingan County (新干县)
- Xiajiang County (峡江县)
- Yongfeng County (永丰县)
- Taihe County (泰和县)
- Wan'an County (万安县)
- Suichuan County (遂川县)

Map
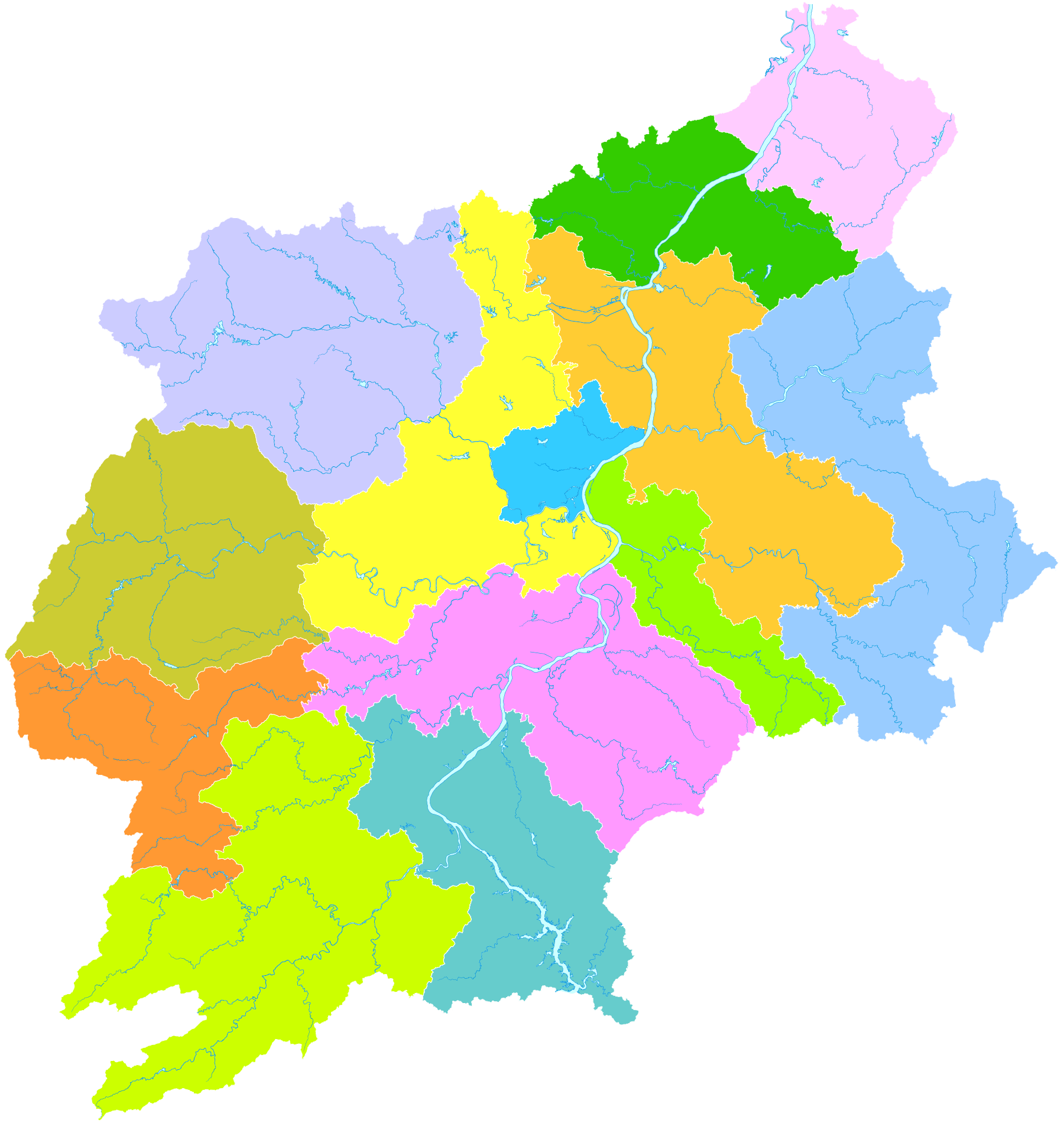

== Geography ==
The longitude of Ji'an City is 114.986373 east longitude, and the latitude is 27.111699 north latitude.

=== Climate ===
Ji'an has a humid subtropical climate (Köppen Cfa) affected by the East Asian monsoon, with long, humid, very hot summers and cool and drier winters with occasional cold snaps. The monthly 24-hour average temperature ranges from 6.6 °C (43.9 °F) in January to 29.8 °C (85.6 °F) in July, with an annual average of 18.69 °C (65.6 °F). The average annual precipitation is around 1,570 mm (62 in). With monthly percent possible sunshine ranging from 19% in March to 59% in July, the city receives 1,641 hours of bright sunshine annually. Winter begins somewhat sunny and dry but becomes progressively wetter and cloudier; spring begins especially gloomy, and from April to June each of the months averages more than 210 mm (8.3 in) of rainfall. After the heavy rains subside in June, summer is especially sunny. Autumn is warm and relatively dry.

Climate data for Ji'an (Ji'an County), elevation 71 m (233 ft), (1991–2020 normals, extremes 1971–present)
Month	Jan	Feb	Mar	Apr	May	Jun	Jul	Aug	Sep	Oct	Nov	Dec	Year
Record high °C (°F)	26.8 (80.2)	31.0 (87.8)	32.6 (90.7)	36.2 (97.2)	36.8 (98.2)	38.1 (100.6)	40.9 (105.6)	41.1 (106.0)	39.6 (103.3)	36.7 (98.1)	32.9 (91.2)	29.4 (84.9)	41.1 (106.0)
Mean daily maximum °C (°F)	10.5 (50.9)	13.7 (56.7)	17.3 (63.1)	23.9 (75.0)	28.4 (83.1)	31.1 (88.0)	34.7 (94.5)	34.0 (93.2)	30.4 (86.7)	25.5 (77.9)	19.5 (67.1)	13.3 (55.9)	23.5 (74.3)
Daily mean °C (°F)	6.9 (44.4)	9.5 (49.1)	13.2 (55.8)	19.3 (66.7)	23.9 (75.0)	26.9 (80.4)	29.9 (85.8)	29.2 (84.6)	25.7 (78.3)	20.5 (68.9)	14.8 (58.6)	9.0 (48.2)	19.1 (66.3)
Mean daily minimum °C (°F)	4.4 (39.9)	6.7 (44.1)	10.2 (50.4)	16.0 (60.8)	20.5 (68.9)	23.8 (74.8)	26.3 (79.3)	25.6 (78.1)	22.2 (72.0)	16.9 (62.4)	11.3 (52.3)	5.8 (42.4)	15.8 (60.5)
Record low °C (°F)	−7.1 (19.2)	−8.0 (17.6)	−1.6 (29.1)	2.7 (36.9)	10.6 (51.1)	15.5 (59.9)	19.0 (66.2)	19.3 (66.7)	12.5 (54.5)	3.3 (37.9)	−3.0 (26.6)	−6.7 (19.9)	−8.0 (17.6)
Average precipitation mm (inches)	75.5 (2.97)	89.4 (3.52)	185.1 (7.29)	199.4 (7.85)	224.4 (8.83)	277.9 (10.94)	159.1 (6.26)	136.6 (5.38)	80.9 (3.19)	60.9 (2.40)	84.0 (3.31)	58.1 (2.29)	1,631.3 (64.23)
Average precipitation days (≥ 0.1 mm)	13.1	13.6	18.1	17.6	17	16.1	10.6	11.9	8.4	7.3	9.6	10.3	153.6
Average snowy days	2.2	1.1	0.4	0	0	0	0	0	0	0	0	0.8	4.5
Average relative humidity (%)	81	81	83	81	80	81	72	76	78	75	78	77	79
Mean monthly sunshine hours	65.7	68.5	72.6	102.1	124.6	132.4	229.4	208.0	160.4	145.4	116.3	104.0	1,529.4
Percentage possible sunshine	20	22	19	27	30	32	55	52	44	41	36	32	34
Source: China Meteorological Administration all-time extreme temperature

== Transportation ==
Jinggangshan Airport in Taihe County serves Ji'an. The airport, also known as Ji'an Airport, is an airport serving the city of Ji'an in Jiangxi Province, China. The airport is located in Taihe County, under the jurisdiction of Ji'an City, 30 kilometers (19 miles) from Ji'an City. The Beijing-Kowloon Railway line passes through the Ji'an municipality with train stations in Xingan, Xiajiang, Jishui, Ji'an (Ji'an Station), and Taihe. Ji'an is connected to the China National Highways 105 and 319. The total mileage of roads in the city reaches 9,000 kilometers.

== Education ==
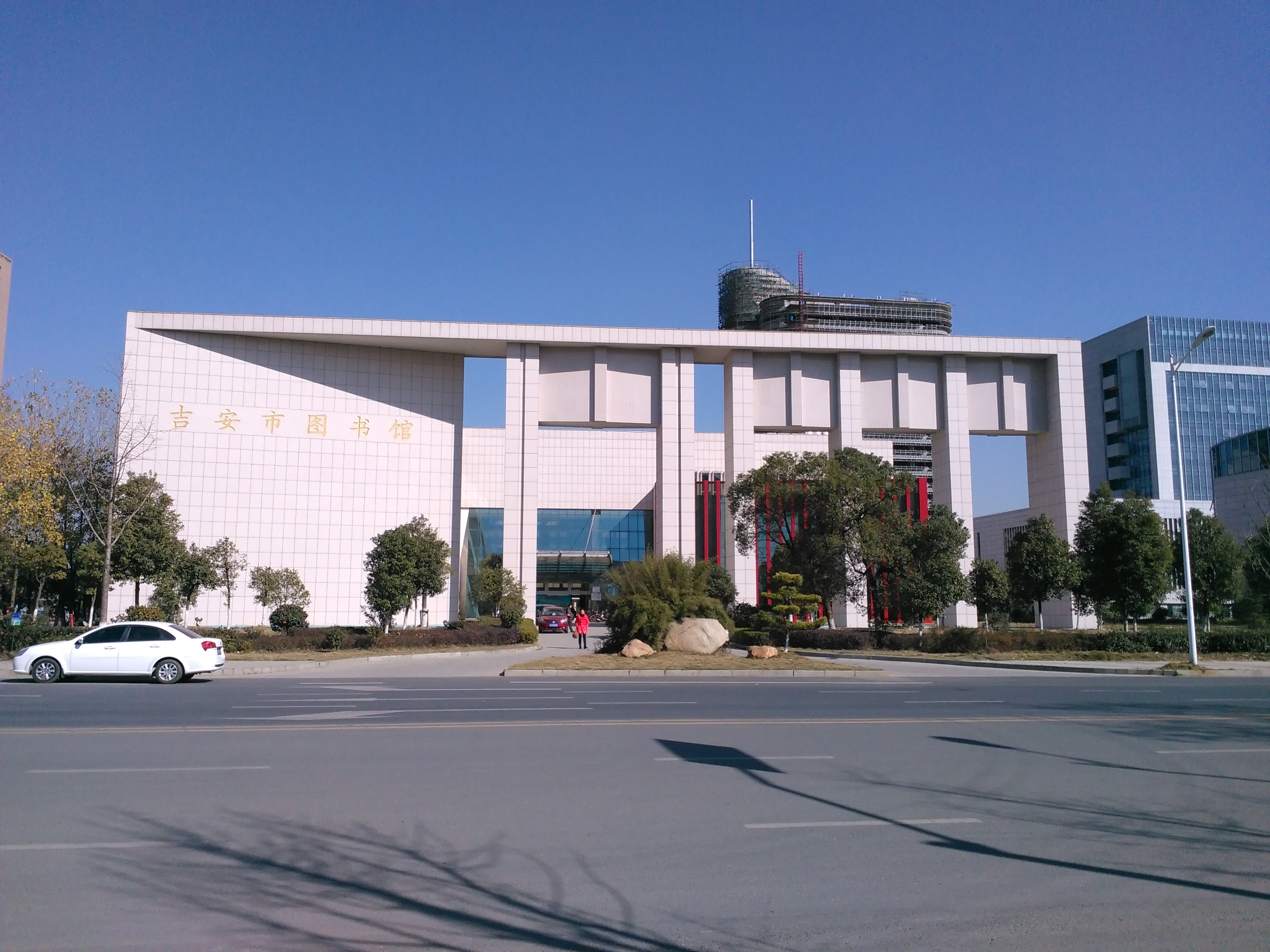
Ji'an Library

Jinggangshan University is located in Qingyuan District, Ji'an.The school currently has three campuses: Qingyuan, Jifu and Changgang.

The Ji'an Public Library (吉安市图书馆), with its main library in Jizhou District, serves the city.

== Notable people ==
- Ouyang Xiu (欧阳修), a statesman, historian, poet and essayist of the Song Dynasty.
- Ouyang Ziyuan (欧阳自远), a cosmochemist, geochemist and space advocate.
- Wen Tianxiang (文天祥), a scholar general, and famed anti-Yuan leader during the latter days of the Southern Song Dynasty.
- Yang Wanli (杨万里), one of the "four masters" of poetry of the Southern Song Dynasty.
- Hu Quan (胡铨), essayist and one of the four grand ministers of the Southern Song Dynasty.
- Zhou Bida (周必大), a left prime minister during the Southern Song Dynasty.
- Luo Hongxian (羅洪先), a Ming Dynasty cartographer.
- Xiao Gang, former deputy governor of the People's Bank of China.
- Liu Zhi, former general of Republic of China.
- Zeng Qinghong (曾庆红), former Vice President of China
