= Yuanzhou =

Yuanzhou may refer to:

== Modern locations ==
- Yuanzhou District, Yichun (袁州区) Jiangxi, named after the historical prefecture
- Yuanzhou District, Guyuan (原州区) Ningxia, named after the historical prefecture
- Yuanzhou, Guangdong (园洲), a town in Boluo County, Guangdong

== Historical locations ==
- Yuanzhou (modern Jiangxi) (袁州), a prefecture between the 6th and 20th centuries
- Yuanzhou (modern Ningxia) (原州), a prefecture between the 6th and 13th centuries in modern Ningxia and Gansu
- Yuanzhou (modern Liaoning) (原州), a prefecture between the 11th and 12th centuries

== See also ==
- Yuan (disambiguation)
- Wonju (Hanja: 原州市), a city in Gangwon, South Korea
