= COVID-19 pandemic in Jiangxi =

- Disease: COVID-19
- Pathogen: SARS-CoV-2
- Location: Jiangxi, China
- First outbreak: Wuhan, Hubei
- Arrival date: 2020
- Confirmed cases: 957
- Active cases: 14
- Recovered: 943
- Deaths: 1

The COVID-19 pandemic reached the province of Jiangxi, China.

== Statistics ==
Division	Active	Confirmed	Deceased	Recovered
Jiangxi	14	957	1	943
Nanchang	0	231	0	231
Overseas import	0	6	0	6
Xinyu	0	0		
Shangrao	14	0		
Jiujiang	0	0		
Yichun, Jiangxi	0	0		
Ganzhou	0	76	1	75
Fuzhou, Jiangxi	0	0		
Pingxiang	0	0		
Ji'an	0	0		
Yingtan	0	0		
Jingdezhen	0	6	0	6
Ganjiang New Area	0	1	0	1

== Timeline ==
=== 2020 ===
On January 23, Jiangxi Province reported 1 new confirmed case, which was a severe case, and it was also the first confirmed case reported in Nanchang City.

On January 24, Jiangxi Province reported 4 new confirmed cases, including 1 in Nanchang, 1 in Ji'an, 1 in Jiujiang, and 1 in Xinyu.

On January 25, Jiangxi Province reported 11 new confirmed cases, including 3 in Fuzhou, 2 in Ganzhou, 2 in Shangrao, 1 in Nanchang, 1 in Jiujiang, 1 in Jingdezhen, and 1 in Yichun; Jingdezhen City, Ganzhou City, Yichun City, and Shangrao City were the first confirmed cases.

On January 26, Jiangxi Province reported 18 new confirmed cases (including 2 severe cases), including 5 cases in Ganzhou City, 4 cases in Yichun City, 4 cases in Shangrao City, 2 cases in Fuzhou City, 1 case in Nanchang City, and 1 case in Pingxiang City with 1 case in Ji'an City.

On January 28, Jiangxi Province reported 24 new confirmed cases and 2 cured and discharged cases. Among the newly confirmed cases, there were 9 in Nanchang, 5 in Jiujiang, 4 in Yichun, 3 in Ganzhou, 1 in Yingtan, 1 in Shangrao, and 1 in Fuzhou. Yingtan reported the first confirmed case. Among the discharged cases, 1 in Ji'an City and 1 in Pingxiang City.

On January 30, Jiangxi Province reported 53 new confirmed cases of pneumonia caused by a new type of coronavirus. Among the newly confirmed cases, 21 were in Nanchang, 15 in Jiujiang, 5 in Ganzhou, 4 in Fuzhou, 3 in Pingxiang, 2 in Yingtan, 2 in Shangrao, and 1 in Ji'an.

On January 31, Jiangxi Province reported 78 new confirmed cases of new coronavirus-infected pneumonia and 4 new discharged cases. Among the newly confirmed cases, 21 were in Nanchang, 17 in Xinyu, 12 in Yichun, 11 in Jiujiang, 6 in Ganzhou, 3 in Pingxiang, 3 in Ji'an, 2 in Fuzhou, and 1 in Jingdezhen, 1 case in Yingtan City, and 1 case in Shangrao City. Among the newly discharged cases, 1 was in Nanchang, 1 in Jingdezhen, 1 in Xinyu, and 1 in Shangrao.

In the afternoon of the same day, Jiangxi Province stated at a press conference that because an employee surnamed Huang of Xinyu Fourth Hospital was diagnosed with infection on January 23, some medical staff who had contact with him also developed symptoms. The case was related to Huang, so it was decided to temporarily close Xinyu Fourth Hospital.

=== 2021 ===
From 00:00 to 24:00 on March 20, Jiangxi Province reported a new confirmed case of imported novel coronavirus pneumonia. The newly imported confirmed case was a Chinese nationals working in Zimbabwe. He entered the country from Nanjing on March 1, and returned to Jiangxi after the centralized isolation was lifted on March 15. On March 16, the nucleic acid test was positive, and he was transferred to a designated hospital for investigation. The expert group diagnosed him as an asymptomatic infection of the new coronavirus. Relevant symptoms appeared on March 20, and the expert group diagnosed it as a confirmed case of new coronary pneumonia (common type).

On March 25, a new case of asymptomatic infection was added in Honggutan District, Nanchang City, Jiangxi Province. It was a close contact of an imported confirmed case reported by Jiangxi on March 20. The next day, the asymptomatic infected person was converted to a confirmed case.

=== 2022 ===
On January 26, Jiangxi Province added an asymptomatic infection (in Shangrao City) associated with a provincial case.

=== 2023 ===
On January 24, Dongxiang District of Fuzhou City issued a notice for free nucleic acid testing, triggering a controversy over "restoration of nucleic acid for all staff". In the end, the local government clarified that the testing was voluntary and issued a public apology.
