= Yuan Prefecture =

Historical administrative division in Jiangxi, China

Yuanzhou or Yuan Prefecture (袁州) was a zhou (prefecture) in imperial China centering on modern Yichun, Jiangxi, China. It existed (intermittently) from 591 to 1912.

== Geography ==
The administrative region of Yuanzhou in the Tang dynasty includes modern Yichun and Xinyu in Jiangxi.

The administrative region of Yuanzhou in the Song dynasty includes modern Yichun and Wanzai County in Jiangxi.

The administrative region of Yuanzhou in the Yuan dynasty includes modern Yichun, Wanzai County, Pingxiang and Fenyi County in Jiangxi. It was known as Yuanzhou Circuit (袁州路).

The administrative region of Yuanzhou in the Ming dynasty and Qing dynasty is similar to that in the Yuan dynasty. It was known as Yuanzhou Prefecture (袁州府).

== See also ==
- Yichun Commandery
