= Yichun Mingyueshan Airport =

Yichun Mingyueshan Airport 宜春明月山机场
- IATA: YIC; ICAO: ZSYC

Summary
- Airport type: Public
- Serves: Yichun, Jiangxi, China
- Location: Yuanzhou District
- Opened: 26 June 2013; 13 years ago
- Elevation AMSL: 131 m / 430 ft
- Coordinates: 27°48′12″N 114°18′29″E

Map
- Location of airport in Jiangxi

Runways
Direction	Length		Surface
Direction	m	ft	Surface
06/24	2,400	7,874	Concrete

Statistics (2025)
- Passengers: 478,269
- Aircraft movements: 5,325
- Cargo (metric tons): 50.3

Yichun Mingyueshan Airport
- Simplified Chinese: 宜春明月山机场
- Traditional Chinese: 宜春明月山機場
Transcriptions
Standard Mandarin
- Hanyu Pinyin: Yíchūn Míngyuèshān Jīchǎng

Yichun Mingyueshan Airport (IATA: YIC, ICAO: ZSYC) is an airport serving the city of Yichun in Jiangxi Province, China. It is located in Hutian Town, Yuanzhou District. As the only airport in western Jiangxi, it also serves the nearby cities of Pingxiang and Xinyu in addition to Yichun, with a total population of 10 million. It is named after Mingyueshan (Moon Mountain), a national forest park near Yichun. Construction of the airport began on 26 July 2009. Originally scheduled to open in 2011, the airport opened on 26 June 2013.

== History ==
On July 26, 2009, the groundbreaking ceremony for Yichun Mingyue Mountain Airport was officially held.

In October 2010, the National Development and Reform Commission approved the feasibility study report for the Yichun Mingyue Mountain Airport project in Jiangxi Province. The initial phase was designed to handle 200,000 passengers and 1,200 tons of cargo by 2020. The main construction included a new 2,400-meter runway (4C flight zone rating), a new 3,500-square-meter terminal building, a three-stand apron, and related supporting facilities.

On January 26, 2013, a calibration aircraft dispatched by the Civil Aviation Flight Calibration Center of China took off from Yichun Mingyueshan Airport to begin calibration work on the airport, a process that lasted four days. On March 28, 2013, China Eastern Airlines' A320 aircraft conducted test flights of traditional flight procedures and Performance-Based Navigation (PBN) procedures at Yichun Mingyue Mountain Airport.

On June 26, 2013, Lucky Air's Boeing 737-700 aircraft, operating flight 8L9885 (Kunming-Yichun-Shanghai Hongqiao), landed at Yichun Mingyueshan Airport, marking the airport's official opening.

In 2017, Mingyue Mountain Airport's passenger throughput exceeded 500,000, far surpassing the airport's initial design target of 200,000 passengers by 2020. To meet the growing demand, the expansion project of Mingyue Mountain Airport was put on the agenda. In 2017, Mingyue Mountain Airport received an investment of 110 million yuan for apron expansion. On October 26, 2017, the expansion project of Mingyue Mountain Airport was officially launched. In September 2019, the airport apron expansion project was completed and put into use, increasing the number of apron stands from 3 to 11.

== Facilities ==
The airport has a runway that is 2,400 meters long and 45 meters wide (class 4C), and a 6,000-square-meter terminal building. It is projected to handle 200,000 passengers and 1,200 tons of cargo annually by 2020.

== Airlines and destinations ==
Airlines	Destinations
Beijing Capital Airlines	Sanya, Xi'an
Hainan Airlines	Dalian, Guangzhou
Shenzhen Airlines	Beijing–Capital, Shenzhen
West Air	Chongqing

== See also ==
- List of airports in China
- List of the busiest airports in China
