= Yichun Confucian Temple =

- 宜春文庙
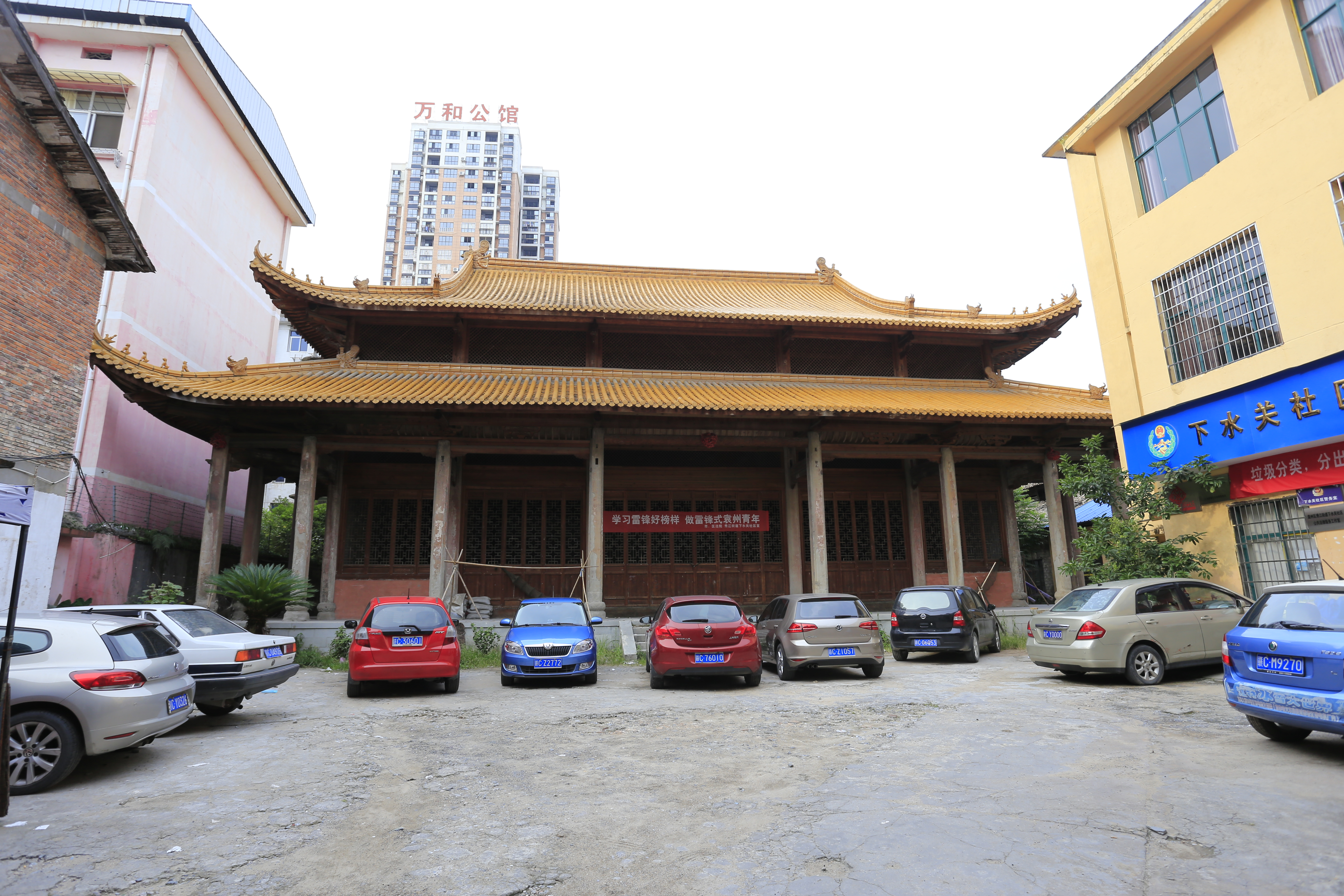
- Yichun Confucian Temple in June 2018.

Religion
- Affiliation: Confucianism

Location
- Location: Fengcheng, Yichun, Jiangxi
- Country: China
- Interactive map of Yichun Confucian Temple
- Coordinates: 27°48′02.91″N 114°23′06.68″E

Architecture
- Style: Chinese architecture
- Established: 1143
- Completed: 1934 (restoration)

Yichun Confucian Temple (simplified Chinese: 宜春文庙; traditional Chinese: 宜春文廟; pinyin: Yíchūn Wénmiào) is a Confucian temple located in Yichun, Jiangxi, China.

== History ==
Founded in 1143 in the reign of Emperor Gaozong of Song by the local government, it was enlarged, burned, and rededicated several times. The last restoration was in 1934. In history, it had over ten halls and rooms, such as the Gate, Pond (泮池), Hall of Minglun (明伦堂), Pavilion of Zunjing (尊经阁), Palace of Wenchang (文昌宫), and Pavilion of Kuixing (魁星阁).

== Architecture ==
The extant building only the Hall of Dacheng (大成殿). The Hall of Dacheng in it has double-eave gable and hip roofs covered with yellow glazed tiles, which symbolize a high level in architecture. Rebuilt and renovated in many dynasties, now it is 22.5-metre (74 ft) wide, 16.6-metre (54 ft) deep and 13.5-metre (44 ft) high and preserves the largest, grandest and most magnificent hall in Jiangxi.
