= Yangqiao =

Yangqiao may refer to the following towns in China:

- Yangqiao, Boluo County (杨侨镇), Guangdong
- Yangqiao, Binyang County (洋桥镇), Guangxi

Written as "杨桥镇":

- Yangqiao, Anqing, in Yixiu District, Anqing, Anhui
- Yangqiao, Linquan County, Anhui
- Yangqiao, Daming County, Hebei
- Yangqiao, Hengdong (杨桥镇), a town of Hengdong County, Hunan.
- Yangqiao, Shaodong, in Shaodong County, Hunan
- Yangqiao, Fenyi County, in Fenyi County, Jiangxi
