= Xinyu railway station =

Railway station in Xinyu, China

Xinyu 新余
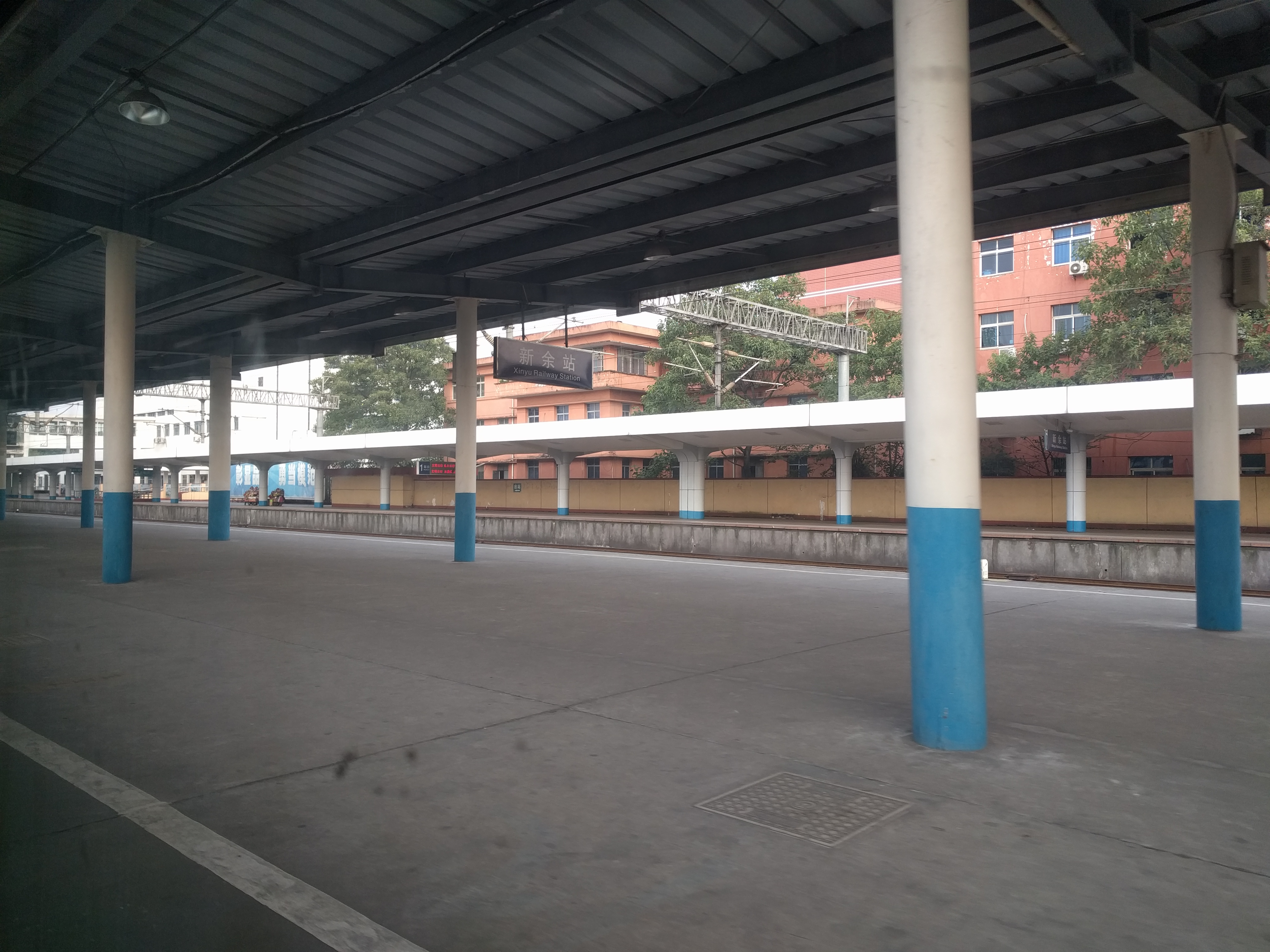
- Xinyu railway station Platform

General information
- Location: Yushui District, Xinyu, Jiangxi; China
- Coordinates: 27°48′46.886″N 114°56′4.704″E
- Operated by: China Railway Nanchang Group, China Railway Corporation
- Line: Shanghai–Kunming railway
- Platforms: 3

History
- Opened: 1937
Location

Xinyu railway station (Chinese: 新余站; pinyin: Xīnyú zhàn) is a railway station located in Xinyu, Jiangxi, China, on the Shanghai–Kunming railway.

== History ==
The station opened in 1937.

== See also ==
- Xinyu North railway station

Preceding station	China Railway	Following station
Zhangshu towards Shanghai or Shanghai South	Shanghai–Kunming railway	Fenyi towards Kunming
