= Gaocheng, Jiangxi =

Gaocheng 高城镇
- Town
- Location in Jiangxi Gaocheng (China)
- Coordinates: 28°06′23″N 114°20′48″E
- Country: People's Republic of China
- Province: Jiangxi
- Prefecture-level city: Yichun
- County: Wanzai
- Village-level divisions: 1 residential community and 13 villages
- Elevation: 96 m (315 ft)
- Time zone: UTC+8 (China Standard)
- Area code: 0795

Gaocheng (Chinese: 高城; pinyin: Gāochéng; lit. 'high city') is a town of Wanzai County in northwestern Jiangxi province, China, located about 10 kilometres (6.2 mi) due west of the county seat. As of 2020, it administers Gaocheng Street Residential Neighborhood and the following 13 villages:

- Gaocheng Village
- Liansheng Village (联胜村)
- Qiaoxi Village (桥溪村)
- Shaotian Village (烧田村)
- Qifeng Village (奇枫村)
- Nanmiao Village (南庙村)
- Taoyuan Village (桃源村)
- Meiyuan Village (梅源村)
- Lishan Village (里山村)
- Daping Village (大坪村)
- Tuanjie Village (团结村)
- Guyuan Village (谷源村)
- Fusheng Village (复胜村)

== See also ==
- List of township-level divisions of Jiangxi
