= Yichun Airport =

Yichun Airport may refer to:

- Yichun Lindu Airport, serving Yichun, Heilongjiang, China
- Yichun Mingyueshan Airport, serving Yichun, Jiangxi, China
