= Lucun =

Lucun may refer to the following locations in China:

- Lucun, Jieshou (芦村镇), town in Anhui
- Lucun, Jiangxi (芦村镇), town in Yuanzhou District, Yichun
- Lucun, Shandong (鲁村镇), town in Yiyuan County
- Lucun Township (卢村乡), Guangde County, Anhui
