= Yushui, Xinyu =

Coordinates: 27°50′N 115°00′E

Yushui 渝水区
- District
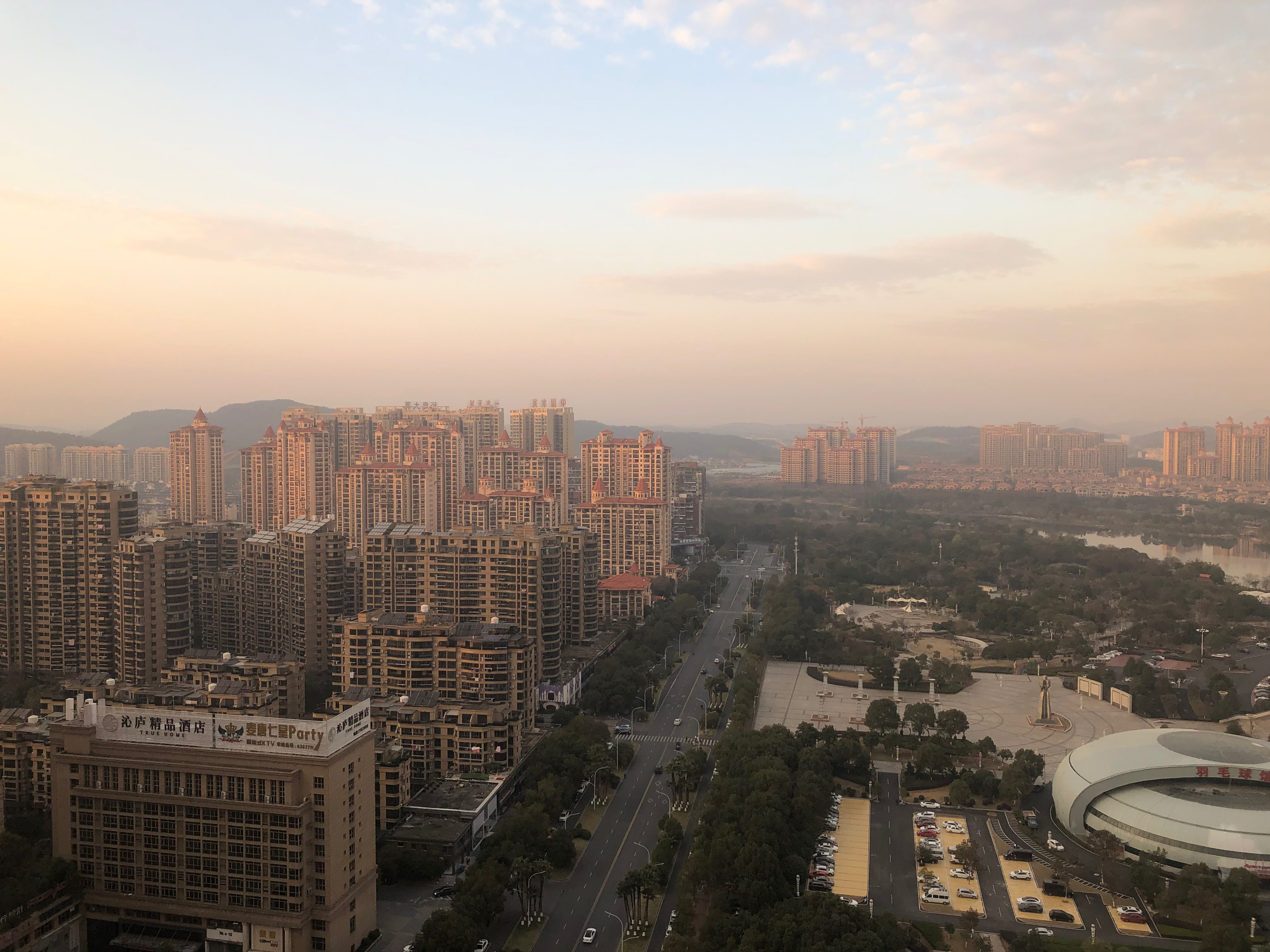
- Interactive map of Yushui
- Country: People's Republic of China
- Province: Jiangxi
- Prefecture-level city: Xinyu

Area
  - Total: 1,775 km^{2} (685 sq mi)

Population (2018)
  - Total: 697,100
  - Density: 392.7/km^{2} (1,017/sq mi)
- Time zone: UTC+8 (China Standard)
- Postal Code: 338000
- Area code: 0790
- Website: www.yushui.gov.cn

Yushui (Chinese: 渝水; pinyin: Yúshuǐ) is the only district of and one of two divisions of the prefecture-level city of Xinyu, Jiangxi province, China, the other being Fenyi County. It has a land area of 1,776 km^{2} (686 sq mi), and a population of 839,500 as of 2010. The zip code is 338025.

== Administrative divisions ==
Yushui has direct jurisdiction over 5 subdistricts, 10 towns, and 6 townships.

5 subdistricts

- Chengnan (城南街道)
- Chengbei (城北街道)
- Yuanhe (袁河街道)
- Xianlai (仙来街道)
- Tongzhou (通州街道)

- 5 Former Subdistricts which are merged : Kongmu Jiang Subdistrict, Mahong Subdistrict, Qinyang Subdistrict, Fenghuangwan Subdistrict, and Yangtiangang Subdistrict

10 towns

- Luofang (罗坊镇)
- Shuibei (水北镇)
- Liangshan (良山镇)
- Shuixi (水西镇)
- Yaoxu (姚圩镇)
- Xiacun (下村镇)
- Zhushan (珠珊镇)
- Hexia (河下镇)
- Ouli (欧里镇)
- Guanchao (观巢镇)

6 townships

- Nan'an (南安乡)
- Jieshui (界水乡)
- Renhe (人和乡)
- Jiulongshan (九龙山乡)
- Hushan (鹄山乡)
- Xinxi (新溪乡)
