= Hu Xiaomei =

Chinese radio personality

- Born: 24 December 1971 (age 54); Fengcheng City, Jiangxi Province, P.R.China
- Years active: 1992—2007
- Spouse: Tang Hao (2002-Present)
- Awards: "Golden Microphone": Broadcasting Gold Award, "The Best 10 Shows in the Nation"

Hu Xiaomei (Chinese: 胡晓梅) is a Chinese radio personality and former host of the show At Night You're Not Lonely (Chinese: 《夜空不寂寞》) in Shenzhen, China which at its peak attracted two million nightly listeners.

Hu is private about details of her personal life. It is known that she is petite, was born in 1971, smokes cigarettes, and does not speak English. She grew up in a coal mining town in Jiangxi Province, daughter of engineers. She was married in 2002.

Hu migrated to Shenzhen in 1992, attracted by the public perception and entertainment media accounts of Shenzhen (designated as one of China's new Special Economic Zones) as a cosmopolitan city with opportunities for upward mobility. She initially worked at a mineral water factory earning the equivalent of US$70 per month. At night she would listen to radio call-in shows that were becoming popular in China under its new policy of "Reform and Opening".

In late she called into a talk radio and mentioned her own hopes of becoming a show host, and gave out her phone number and address. This led to many letters, but also to her employer firing her for using their telephone for personal purposes. Out of work, she brought her resume to the radio station to ask for a job. One producer decided to hire her as a host beginning December 1992. The show she hosted from 2003 through 2007 eventually became the top rated show in Shenzhen. She was known for a "smoky" voice and calm but often critical tone. Her show had wide appeal, especially to migrant workers, who would call in from their dormitories to discuss family, work, and their romantic lives.

== Books ==
- Speak, Loneliness (Chinese: 《说吧，寂寞》)

The book is about how Hu, being a miner's daughter, became a hostess in a broadcasting station from an employee of a mineral water factory.

- Speak, Love (Chinese: 《说吧，爱情》)

This is her second book whose sub title is Interpretation of Chinese love. She analysed some real situations of love in China on the theory of Horney Karen's Psychoanalysis in this book. The article Sex, Lies, Muzimei (Chinese: 《性·谎言·木子美》) is published in a magazine called Skyline (Chinese: 《天涯》) in China. A novel of Xiang Xingxing (Chinese: 向星星) named Fall in Love with the Garter which Hanged Myself (Chinese: 《爱上吊死我的袜带》) is included for interpretation. In addition, Xiang Xingxing is an assumed name of Tang Hao (Chinese: 唐浩), Hu's husband.

- Say Good-bye to Loneliness (Chinese: 《告别寂寞》)

Hu wrote this book after she left At Night You’re Not Lonely in 2007. There are 2 CDs which includes the soundtracks of the interviews of Kevin Tsai, Sisy Chen and so on for each book.
