= Wanzai County =

Wanzai County 万载县 Wantsai
- County
- Coordinates: 28°06′22″N 114°26′44″E
- Country: People's Republic of China
- Province: Jiangxi
- Prefecture-level city: Yichun

Area
  - Total: 1,719.16 km^{2} (663.77 sq mi)

Population (2018)
  - Total: 577,327
  - Density: 335.819/km^{2} (869.768/sq mi)
- Time zone: UTC+8 (China Standard)
- Postal code: 336100

Wanzai County (simplified Chinese: 万载县; traditional Chinese: 萬載縣; pinyin: Wànzài Xiàn) is a county under the administration of the prefecture-level city of Yichun in the northwest of Jiangxi province, China, bordering Hunan province to the west. The name Wanzai literally means "10,000 years". It could also mean "10,000 loads" and could likely be related to its past importance as a center of trade. It is located along the Long He or Dragon River, a tributary of the main river of the province, the Gan River. It has an area of 1,718 km^{2} (663 sq mi) and a population of 460,000.

The Wanzai area was first settled 3,000 years ago. It was a prosperous city in the Ming and Qing Dynasties. Like much of Jiangxi it was also important in fostering the Chinese Communist Revolution. Today it is a small city with major industries including firework manufacturing and rice liquor distillation. Most economic activity is agricultural with rice being the major crop. Its position along the 320 National Highway has helped insure steady economic growth and better access to Pingxiang and Yichun in the west and Nanchang in the north. Like much of western Jiangxi, Wanzai is surrounded by forested mountains. This mountainous region of Jiangxi is home to many different dialects of the Gan Chinese language. Yi-Ping, the Wanzai dialect, is both geographically and linguistically between the Nanchang and Yichun dialects.

== Administrative divisions ==
In the present, Wanzai County has 1 subdistrict, 9 towns and 7 townships.

1 subdistrict

- Kangle (康乐街道)

9 towns

- Zhutan (株潭镇)
- Huangmao (黄茅镇)
- Tanbu (潭埠镇)
- Shuangqiao (双桥镇)
- Gaocun (高村镇)
- Luocheng (罗城镇)
- Sanxing (三兴镇)
- Gaocheng (高城镇)
- Bailiang (白良镇)

7 townships

- Efeng (鹅峰乡)
- Mabu (马埠乡)
- Chixing (赤兴乡)
- Lingdong (岭东乡)
- Baishui (白水乡)
- Xianyuan (仙源乡)
- Jiaohu (茭湖乡)

== Climate ==
Climate data for Wanzai, elevation 123 m (404 ft), (1991–2020 normals, extremes 1981–2010)
Month	Jan	Feb	Mar	Apr	May	Jun	Jul	Aug	Sep	Oct	Nov	Dec	Year
Record high °C (°F)	25.2 (77.4)	29.4 (84.9)	35.2 (95.4)	35.5 (95.9)	36.7 (98.1)	37.9 (100.2)	40.3 (104.5)	41.2 (106.2)	38.1 (100.6)	36.4 (97.5)	31.9 (89.4)	24.3 (75.7)	41.2 (106.2)
Mean daily maximum °C (°F)	9.9 (49.8)	12.7 (54.9)	16.7 (62.1)	23.1 (73.6)	27.6 (81.7)	30.4 (86.7)	33.9 (93.0)	33.6 (92.5)	30.0 (86.0)	24.9 (76.8)	18.9 (66.0)	12.8 (55.0)	22.9 (73.2)
Daily mean °C (°F)	5.9 (42.6)	8.3 (46.9)	12.1 (53.8)	18.1 (64.6)	22.7 (72.9)	25.8 (78.4)	28.7 (83.7)	28.2 (82.8)	24.5 (76.1)	19.1 (66.4)	13.2 (55.8)	7.7 (45.9)	17.9 (64.2)
Mean daily minimum °C (°F)	3.1 (37.6)	5.3 (41.5)	8.9 (48.0)	14.4 (57.9)	19.0 (66.2)	22.4 (72.3)	24.7 (76.5)	24.5 (76.1)	20.8 (69.4)	15.1 (59.2)	9.4 (48.9)	4.2 (39.6)	14.3 (57.8)
Record low °C (°F)	−6.4 (20.5)	−5.1 (22.8)	−2.8 (27.0)	0.2 (32.4)	9.7 (49.5)	13.5 (56.3)	17.3 (63.1)	18.1 (64.6)	11.8 (53.2)	2.1 (35.8)	−2.4 (27.7)	−10.6 (12.9)	−10.6 (12.9)
Average precipitation mm (inches)	89.3 (3.52)	103.5 (4.07)	192.3 (7.57)	194.4 (7.65)	243.5 (9.59)	300.0 (11.81)	186.9 (7.36)	132.6 (5.22)	85.5 (3.37)	59.7 (2.35)	94.8 (3.73)	64.6 (2.54)	1,747.1 (68.78)
Average precipitation days (≥ 0.1 mm)	15.4	14.7	18.9	18.3	17.4	17.1	12.3	13.3	10.3	9.8	11.1	11.8	170.4
Average snowy days	2.9	1.9	0.3	0	0	0	0	0	0	0	0	0.8	5.9
Average relative humidity (%)	83	83	84	82	82	85	80	81	82	81	82	81	82
Mean monthly sunshine hours	66.8	67.7	78.0	105.4	126.6	124.3	202.8	197.4	160.6	142.2	116.0	103.7	1,491.5
Percentage possible sunshine	20	21	21	27	30	30	48	49	44	40	36	32	33
Source: China Meteorological Administration
