= Fengcheng, Jiangxi =

Fengcheng 丰城市
- County-level & Sub-prefectural city
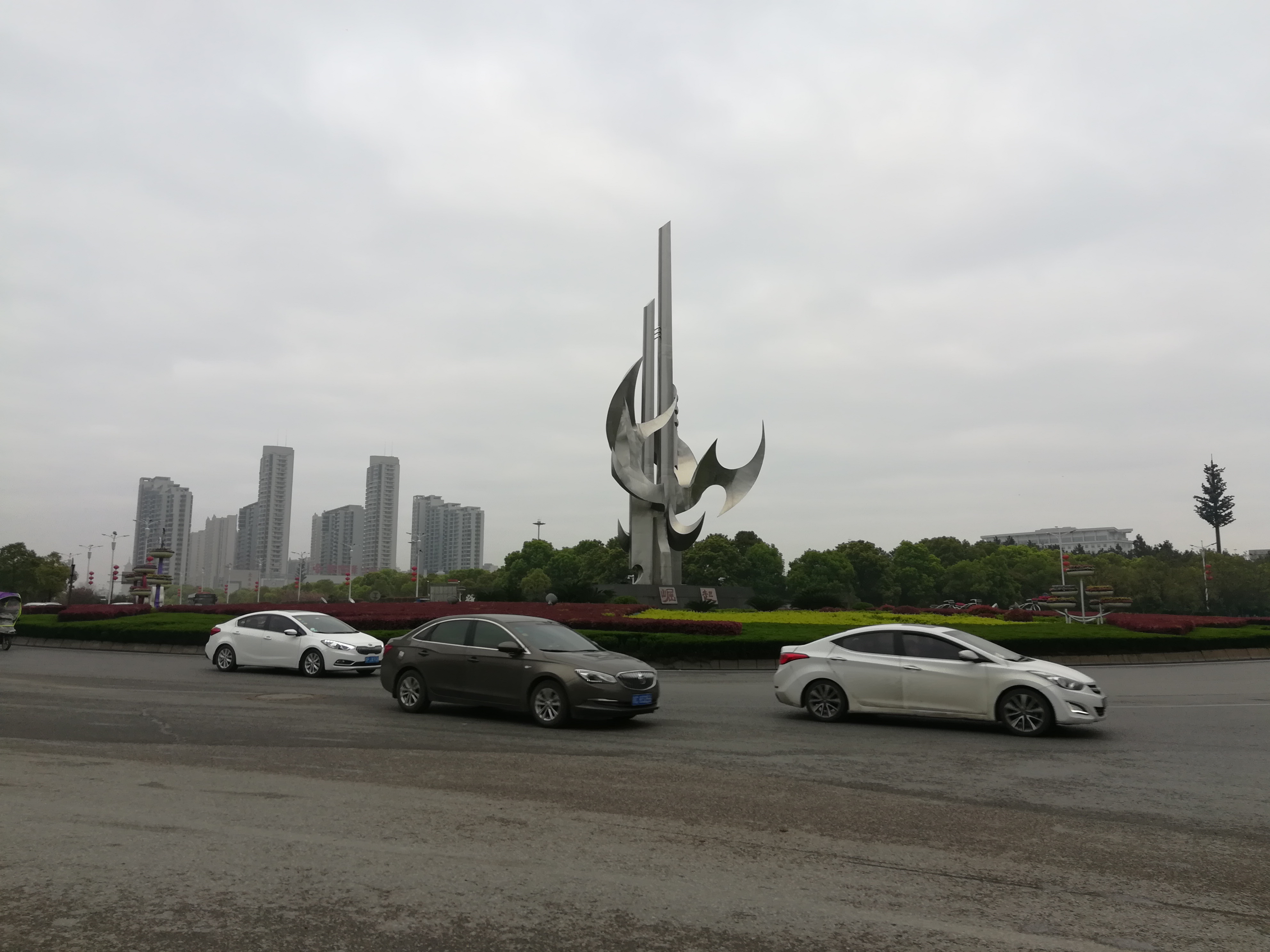

- Location of Fengcheng City jurisdiction in Jiangxi
- Coordinates: 28°11′45″N 115°47′00″E
- Country: People's Republic of China
- Province: Jiangxi
- Prefecture-level city: Yichun

Area
  - Total: 2,845 km^{2} (1,098 sq mi)
- Elevation: 31 m (102 ft)

Population (2019)
  - Total: 1,480,000
  - Density: 520/km^{2} (1,350/sq mi)
- Time zone: UTC+8 (China Standard)
- Postal code: 331100
- Area code: 0795

Fengcheng (simplified Chinese: 丰城; traditional Chinese: 豐城; pinyin: Fēngchéng; Gan: Fung-cing) is a county-level city in northern Jiangxi province, People's Republic of China, under the administration of Yichun, located along China National Highway 105 and on the eastern (right) bank of the Gan River about 55 kilometres (34 mi) south of Nanchang, the provincial capital. The literal translation of the name is "Abundance City", due to its importance as a major commercial hub for agricultural products. There are 26 towns and 7 sub-districts comprising a total area of 2,845 square kilometres (1,098 sq mi) and its population is around 1,370,000. The 2005 GDP was more than 9.1 billion RMB.

In 210 AD, during the Eastern Han dynasty, it was founded as Jianyi County (剑邑县).

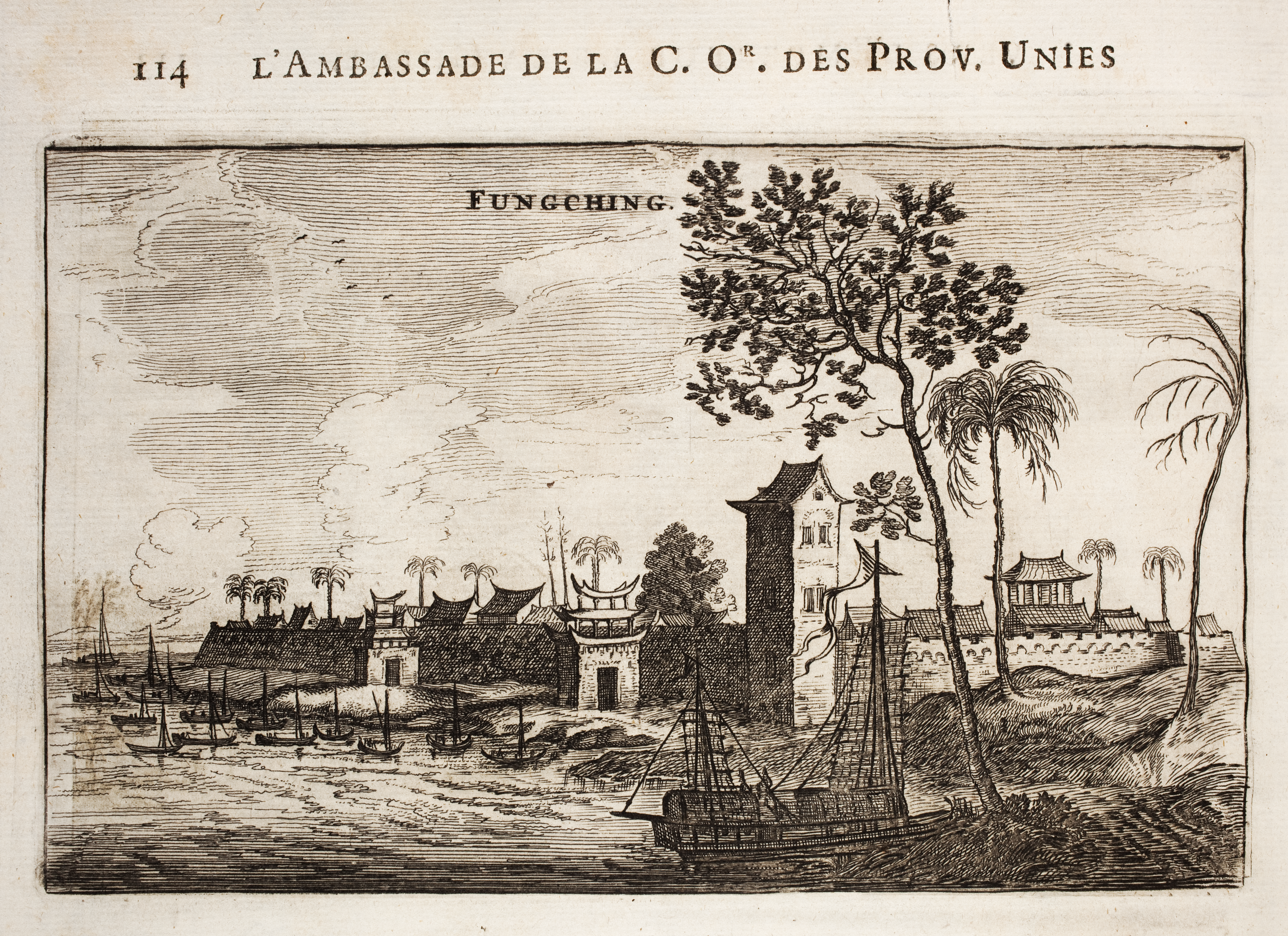
Harbour of "Fungching" (Fengcheng, Yichun, Jiangxi, China, 丰城市)) on a river with boats. Nieuhof: L'ambassade de la Compagnie Orientale des Provinces Unies vers l'Empereur de la Chine, 1665.

== Administrative divisions ==
In the present, Fengcheng City has 5 subdistricts, 20 towns and 7 townships.

5 subdistricts

- Jianguang (剑光街道)
- Hezhou (河洲街道)
- Jiannan (剑南街道)
- Sundu (孙渡街道)
- Shangzhuang (尚庄街道)

20 towns

- Baitu (白土镇)
- Yuandu (袁渡镇)
- Zhangxiang (张巷镇)
- Dushi (杜市镇)
- Taosha (淘沙镇)
- Xiushi (秀市镇)
- Luoshi (洛市镇)
- Tielu (铁路镇)
- Licun (丽村镇)
- Dongjia (董家镇)
- Huangcheng (隍城镇)
- Xiaogang (小港镇)
- Shitan (石滩镇)
- Qiaodong (桥东镇)
- Rongtang (荣塘镇)
- Tuochuan (拖船镇)
- Quangang (泉港镇)
- Meilin (梅林镇)
- Qujiang (曲江镇)
- Shangtang (上塘镇)

7 townships

- Xiaotang (筱塘乡)
- Duantan (段潭乡)
- Jiaokeng (蕉坑乡)
- Shijiang (石江乡)
- Hehu (荷湖乡)
- Hutang (湖塘乡)
- Tongtian (同田乡)

== History ==
=== Origin of geographical names ===
Fengcheng city is named after the west of Rongtang. It is said that the territory is the place where the male and female swords of Moye, the Spring and Autumn generals, are hidden, so it is nicknamed "Sword Town".

=== Cultural relics and historic sites ===
List of key cultural relics under protection in Fengcheng City
Name of cultural relic protection unit	location	lot	category	Reference material
Tomb of Deng Zilong	Dushi Town	The third batch of Jiangxi Province cultural relics protection units	Ancient tombs	
Ruins of Guli City	Tuochuan Town	The sixth batch of Jiangxi Province cultural relics protection units	Ancient heritage site	
Bowl mud Ridge kiln site	Shijiang township	The sixth batch of Jiangxi Province cultural relics protection units	Ancient heritage site	
Dacheng Hall of Confucius Temple	Jianguang Street	The sixth batch of Jiangxi Province cultural relics protection units	Ancient building	
Jiang Yue Guang tomb	Tongtian township	The sixth batch of Jiangxi Province cultural relics protection units	Ancient tombs	
Guilin Academy	Tongtian township	The sixth batch of Jiangxi Province cultural relics protection units	Ancient building	
Lei's ancestral Hall	Chiaokeng township	The sixth batch of Jiangxi Province cultural relics protection units	Ancient building	
North screen Zen forest	Zhanggang Town	The sixth batch of Jiangxi Province cultural relics protection units	Ancient building	

=== Intangible cultural heritage ===
Fengcheng intangible cultural heritage list
name	rank	Item type	Reference material
Gong and Drum Art (Cymbal gong and drum)	National level	Traditional music	
Lion Dance (Fengcheng Yue Jiashi)	National level	Traditional dance	
The legend of Fengcheng Sword	Provincial level	Folk literature	
Fengcheng plum candle	Provincial level	Folk custom	
Fengcheng Xu Zhenjun legend	Provincial level	Folk literature	
Fengcheng hanging joint paper-cut	Provincial level	Traditional art	
Fengcheng wood carving	Provincial level	Traditional art	
Fengcheng frozen rice sugar production skills	Provincial level	Traditional skill	
Fengcheng Chen mother medicine therapy	Provincial level	Traditional medicine	
Fengcheng She Fire	Provincial level	Folk custom	

== Tourist attraction ==
=== Fengshui Lake Cultural Park ===
Fengshui Lake Cultural Park, located in the west of Fengcheng New urban area, Yulong River north branch and south branch intersection. With a total area of 85 hectares (210 acres), it consists of four parts: Fengshui Lake, Fengshui Square, Xinguang Hall and garden landscape belt. The main scenic spots are Hehe Tower, Fengge, Heshun River, Fenglin Bridge and other landscapes.

=== Fengcheng love flower town ===
Fengcheng Love Flower Town, located in Fengcheng Hukun Expressway Meilin exit, with a planned total area of about 4.66 square kilometers. The town has flower and bird garden, water screen movie, Love Sea, vitality forest, coconut forest MIDI barbecue lawn, Crescent Bay Beach, southern plant ornamental garden, Love Sea Flower Castle Hotel, European garden, love Rose Garden, miracle garden and other attractions.

=== Yaohu National Wetland Park ===
Yaohu National Wetland Park is located in the lower reaches of Jinjiang River in the northwest of Fengcheng City, 20 kilometers away from Fengcheng City and 30 kilometers away from Nanchang city. There is a 9.6 km long Ganyue highway bridge on the lake, a stone cave called "Dragon Bed Grottoes" under the foot of the lake, and a small lonely mountain, lotus treasure land, fog city, deaf-mute temple, pine pavilion and other natural and cultural landscapes.

=== Yangliu Lake scenic spot ===
Yangliu Lake Scenic spot is located at the junction of new and old urban areas of Fengcheng City, on the shore of Ganjiang River and Yangliu Lake.There are 5 scenic spots on the central axis of the scenic spot, namely, Dragon column archway, Fengcheng Jianqi, relief of literature and history, imitation of the ancient Great Wall, and Iron ox building.

== Population ==
At the end of 2022, the registered population of Fengcheng City is 1.4707 million (public security annual report), of which 786,900 are males. At the end of the year, the permanent resident population was 1.049 million, of which 510,900 were urban, representing an urbanization rate of 48.7%. There were 9,160 births, 5.8 births per thousand, 6,276 deaths, 3.97 deaths per thousand, and a natural growth rate of 1.82 deaths per thousand.

== Transportation ==
=== Highroad ===
- There are Ganyue Expressway, Dongchang Expressway, Changning Expressway, 105 National Highway, Fenggao Highway, Fengle Highway, Fengfu Highway and other highway trunk lines in Fengcheng City.
- In 2021, Fengcheng City achieved 73.55 million tons of road freight, an increase of 88.9%. Highway freight turnover was 20.781 billion kilometers, up 86.9% year on year. Highway passenger volume in the year was 1.77 million, down 55.4% year-on-year, and passenger transport turnover was 135 million person-kilometers, down 46% year-on-year.

=== Railway ===
- Beijing-kowloon Railway, Shanghai-Kunming Railway, Chang-Jiangxi high-speed railway transit, of which the Beijing-Kowloon Railway is 53.2 kilometers long, with Fengcheng South Station and Zhangxiang Station 2 stations; The Shanghai-Kunming railway is 38.3 kilometers long, with three stations: Fengcheng Station, Xiaogang Station and Tugboat station. Fengcheng section of Chang-gan high-speed Railway is 43 km long, with Fengcheng East station. Fengcheng also has a railway branch line to Kyrgyzstan and a railway special line in Fengluo mining area with a total length of 47.52 kilometers.

=== Shipping ===
- There is one navigable river in Fengcheng City, and the Ganjiang River system of Fengcheng Port has a total length of 43.9 kilometers, which is the third-level navigable standard. The maximum navigable capacity is 3,000 tons of ships, and the annual throughput of 5 million tons of cargo terminals are built. Year-round navigation 500-ton ships, Fengcheng Tongtian can be navigable throughout the year 1000-ton ships, low water period of about 240 meters wide river, flood season up to about 2000 meters, no ebb and flow. The port area is located in the main river of Ganjiang River, south of Zhangshu, Ji 'an, Ganzhou, north of Nanchang, Jiujiang.
- In 2011, Fengcheng Transportation enterprises had 758 cargo ships with 542,000 tonnage; The freight volume was 16.59 million tons, and the freight turnover was 3.193 billion tons kilometers.
- In 2021, Fengcheng City achieved 31.341 million tons of waterway freight, an increase of 17.8%. Waterway freight turnover of 4.134 billion tons kilometers, an increase of 18%.

== Politics ==
=== The main leader of Fengcheng ===
- Party secretary Xu Jieqiang
- Mayor Zhang Shuji

== Notable people ==
- Hu Xiaomei (Chinese: 胡晓梅), radio personality and former host of the show At Night You're Not Lonely (Chinese: 夜空不寂寞)

== Climate ==
Climate data for Fengcheng, elevation 27 m (89 ft), (1991–2020 normals, extremes 1981–2010)
Month	Jan	Feb	Mar	Apr	May	Jun	Jul	Aug	Sep	Oct	Nov	Dec	Year
Record high °C (°F)	25.2 (77.4)	29.8 (85.6)	34.0 (93.2)	35.3 (95.5)	35.8 (96.4)	36.7 (98.1)	39.7 (103.5)	40.7 (105.3)	38.0 (100.4)	36.2 (97.2)	31.7 (89.1)	23.9 (75.0)	40.7 (105.3)
Mean daily maximum °C (°F)	9.3 (48.7)	12.3 (54.1)	16.3 (61.3)	22.9 (73.2)	27.5 (81.5)	30.3 (86.5)	34.2 (93.6)	33.6 (92.5)	29.6 (85.3)	24.7 (76.5)	18.5 (65.3)	12.0 (53.6)	22.6 (72.7)
Daily mean °C (°F)	5.8 (42.4)	8.3 (46.9)	12.3 (54.1)	18.5 (65.3)	23.3 (73.9)	26.3 (79.3)	29.7 (85.5)	29.1 (84.4)	25.2 (77.4)	19.8 (67.6)	13.7 (56.7)	7.8 (46.0)	18.3 (65.0)
Mean daily minimum °C (°F)	3.1 (37.6)	5.4 (41.7)	9.3 (48.7)	15.2 (59.4)	20.0 (68.0)	23.3 (73.9)	26.2 (79.2)	25.8 (78.4)	21.9 (71.4)	16.2 (61.2)	10.3 (50.5)	4.6 (40.3)	15.1 (59.2)
Record low °C (°F)	−5.1 (22.8)	−8.6 (16.5)	−1.5 (29.3)	2.1 (35.8)	10.8 (51.4)	15.0 (59.0)	19.1 (66.4)	19.7 (67.5)	13.4 (56.1)	2.2 (36.0)	−2.2 (28.0)	−14.3 (6.3)	−14.3 (6.3)
Average precipitation mm (inches)	83.5 (3.29)	103.4 (4.07)	196.5 (7.74)	212.9 (8.38)	246.6 (9.71)	329.2 (12.96)	182.2 (7.17)	120.6 (4.75)	70.9 (2.79)	46.5 (1.83)	95.5 (3.76)	63.0 (2.48)	1,750.8 (68.93)
Average precipitation days (≥ 0.1 mm)	14.0	13.9	18.5	17.4	16.7	16.8	11.7	10.8	7.7	7.5	10.1	10.4	155.5
Average snowy days	2.1	1.4	0.2	0	0	0	0	0	0	0	0	0.8	4.5
Average relative humidity (%)	81	81	82	80	80	83	76	78	80	77	79	78	80
Mean monthly sunshine hours	71.9	78.9	87.1	115.6	137.9	131.9	224.7	211.2	168.6	154.5	121.3	108.5	1,612.1
Percentage possible sunshine	22	25	23	30	33	32	53	52	46	44	38	34	36
Source: China Meteorological Administration
