= Yichun, Jiangxi =

Yichun 宜春市 Ichun
- Prefecture-level city
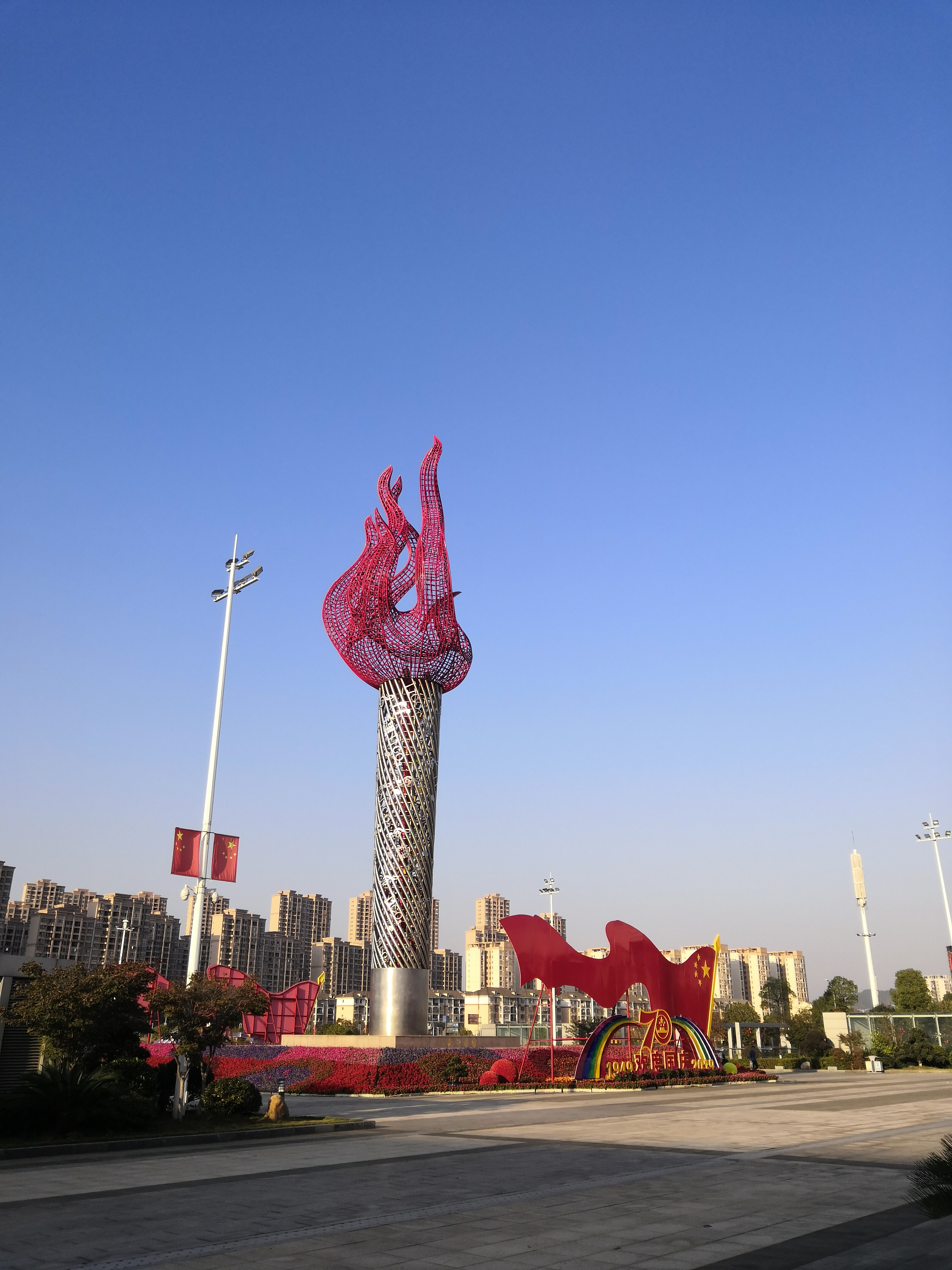
- Torch at Yichun railway station in October 2019

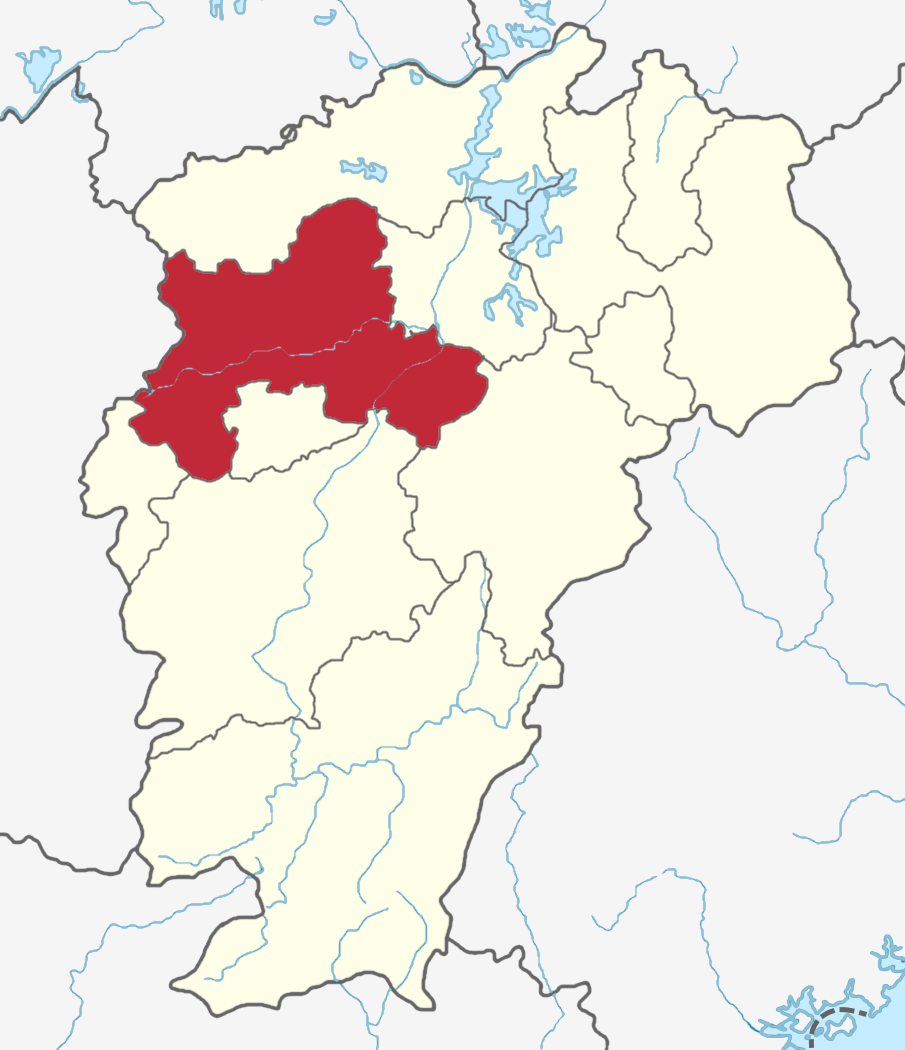
- Location of Yichun City jurisdiction in Jiangxi
- Coordinates (Yichun municipal government): 27°48′58″N 114°25′01″E
- Country: People's Republic of China
- Province: Jiangxi
- Municipal seat: Yuanzhou District

Government
  - Mayor: Jiang Bin

Area
  - Total: 18,637.67 km^{2} (7,196.04 sq mi)
  - Land: 18,669 km^{2} (7,208 sq mi)

Population (2010)
  - Total: 5,419,575
  - Density: 290.30/km^{2} (751.87/sq mi)

GDP
  - Total: CN¥ 162.1 billion US$ 26.0 billion
  - Per capita: CN¥ 29,459; US$ 4,730
- Time zone: UTC+8 (China Standard)
- Postal code: 336000
- Area code: 0795
- ISO 3166 code: CN-JX-09
- Licence plate prefixes: 赣C
- Administrative division code: 360900
- Website: www.yichun.gov.cn

Yichun (Chinese: 宜春; pinyin: Yíchūn; Wade–Giles: I^{2}-ch'un^{1}; postal: Ichun, Yichun dialect: [ȵi˦ tɕʰyn˧˦]) is a mountainous prefecture-level city in the western/northwestern Jiangxi Province, China, bordering Hunan province to the west. It is located in the northwest of the province along a river surrounded by mountains. Yichun literally means "pleasant spring". Yichun has a profound Buddhist culture. "Can Lin Qing Gui", the monastic rules for Buddhists at the Buddhist temple, originated from Yichun. Yichun is also the birthplace of a number of literary figures, such as Tao Yuanming and Deng Gu, both of whom are famous poets in China history.

== Geography and climate ==
Yichun spans 27°33′−29°06′ N latitude and 113°54′−116°27′ E longitude, bordering Nanchang, the provincial capital, and Fuzhou to the east, Ji'an and Xinyu to the south, Pingxiang to the southwest, Changsha and Yueyang (both in Hunan) to the northwest, and Jiujiang to the north.

Yichun has a humid subtropical climate (Köppen Cfa) affected by the East Asian monsoon, with long, humid, very hot summers (albeit slightly cooler than much of the rest of the province) and cool and drier winters with occasional cold snaps. The monthly 24-hour average temperature ranges from 5.6 °C (42.1 °F) in January to 28.6 °C (83.5 °F) in July, with an annual mean of 17.5 °C (63.5 °F). The average annual precipitation is 1,631.5 mm (64 in). Winter begins somewhat sunny and dry but becomes progressively wetter and cloudier; spring begins especially gloomy, and from April to June each of the months averages more than 210 mm (8.3 in) of rainfall. After the heavy rains subside in June, summer is especially sunny. Autumn is warm and relatively dry.

Climate data for Yichun, elevation 131 m (430 ft), (1991–2020 normals, extremes 1971–2010)
| Month | Jan | Feb | Mar | Apr | May | Jun | Jul | Aug | Sep | Oct | Nov | Dec | Year |
|---|---|---|---|---|---|---|---|---|---|---|---|---|---|
| Record high °C (°F) | 25.6 (78.1) | 29.9 (85.8) | 35.0 (95.0) | 36.1 (97.0) | 37.0 (98.6) | 37.5 (99.5) | 39.9 (103.8) | 40.2 (104.4) | 37.7 (99.9) | 36.7 (98.1) | 31.7 (89.1) | 25.3 (77.5) | 40.2 (104.4) |
| Mean daily maximum °C (°F) | 9.5 (49.1) | 12.5 (54.5) | 16.5 (61.7) | 23.0 (73.4) | 27.4 (81.3) | 30.3 (86.5) | 33.6 (92.5) | 33.2 (91.8) | 29.5 (85.1) | 24.5 (76.1) | 18.4 (65.1) | 12.3 (54.1) | 22.6 (72.6) |
| Daily mean °C (°F) | 5.9 (42.6) | 8.4 (47.1) | 12.1 (53.8) | 18.1 (64.6) | 22.7 (72.9) | 25.8 (78.4) | 28.6 (83.5) | 28.0 (82.4) | 24.6 (76.3) | 19.3 (66.7) | 13.4 (56.1) | 7.9 (46.2) | 17.9 (64.2) |
| Mean daily minimum °C (°F) | 3.3 (37.9) | 5.6 (42.1) | 9.0 (48.2) | 14.5 (58.1) | 19.0 (66.2) | 22.5 (72.5) | 24.7 (76.5) | 24.4 (75.9) | 20.9 (69.6) | 15.6 (60.1) | 9.9 (49.8) | 4.7 (40.5) | 14.5 (58.1) |
| Record low °C (°F) | −6.1 (21.0) | −6.9 (19.6) | −2.3 (27.9) | 1.6 (34.9) | 9.2 (48.6) | 12.9 (55.2) | 17.9 (64.2) | 16.9 (62.4) | 11.6 (52.9) | 1.5 (34.7) | −3.8 (25.2) | −8.5 (16.7) | −8.5 (16.7) |
| Average precipitation mm (inches) | 81.2 (3.20) | 93.7 (3.69) | 189.8 (7.47) | 199.0 (7.83) | 223.6 (8.80) | 271.0 (10.67) | 185.6 (7.31) | 130.2 (5.13) | 82.4 (3.24) | 59.6 (2.35) | 92.9 (3.66) | 65.0 (2.56) | 1,674 (65.91) |
| Average precipitation days (≥ 0.1 mm) | 14.7 | 14.2 | 18.2 | 17.7 | 17.1 | 16.4 | 12.8 | 13.4 | 10.1 | 9.1 | 11.0 | 11.5 | 166.2 |
| Average snowy days | 3.7 | 2.1 | 0.3 | 0 | 0 | 0 | 0 | 0 | 0 | 0 | 0 | 0.9 | 7 |
| Average relative humidity (%) | 81 | 81 | 82 | 81 | 80 | 83 | 78 | 79 | 79 | 76 | 79 | 78 | 80 |
| Mean monthly sunshine hours | 64.8 | 66.7 | 78.1 | 105.0 | 127.0 | 126.7 | 205.9 | 192.1 | 157.9 | 143.2 | 116.3 | 101.0 | 1,484.7 |
| Percentage possible sunshine | 20 | 21 | 21 | 27 | 30 | 30 | 49 | 48 | 43 | 41 | 36 | 32 | 33 |
Source 1: China Meteorological Administration
Source 2: Weather China

== Administration ==
Yichun has 1 district, 3 county-level cities, and 6 counties under its direct jurisdiction.

District

- Yuanzhou District (袁州区)

County-level cities

- Zhangshu City (樟树市)
- Fengcheng City (丰城市)
- Gao'an City (高安市)

Counties

- Jing'an County (靖安县)
- Fengxin County (奉新县)
- Shanggao County (上高县)
- Yifeng County (宜丰县)
- Tonggu County (铜鼓县)
- Wanzai County (万载县)

Map
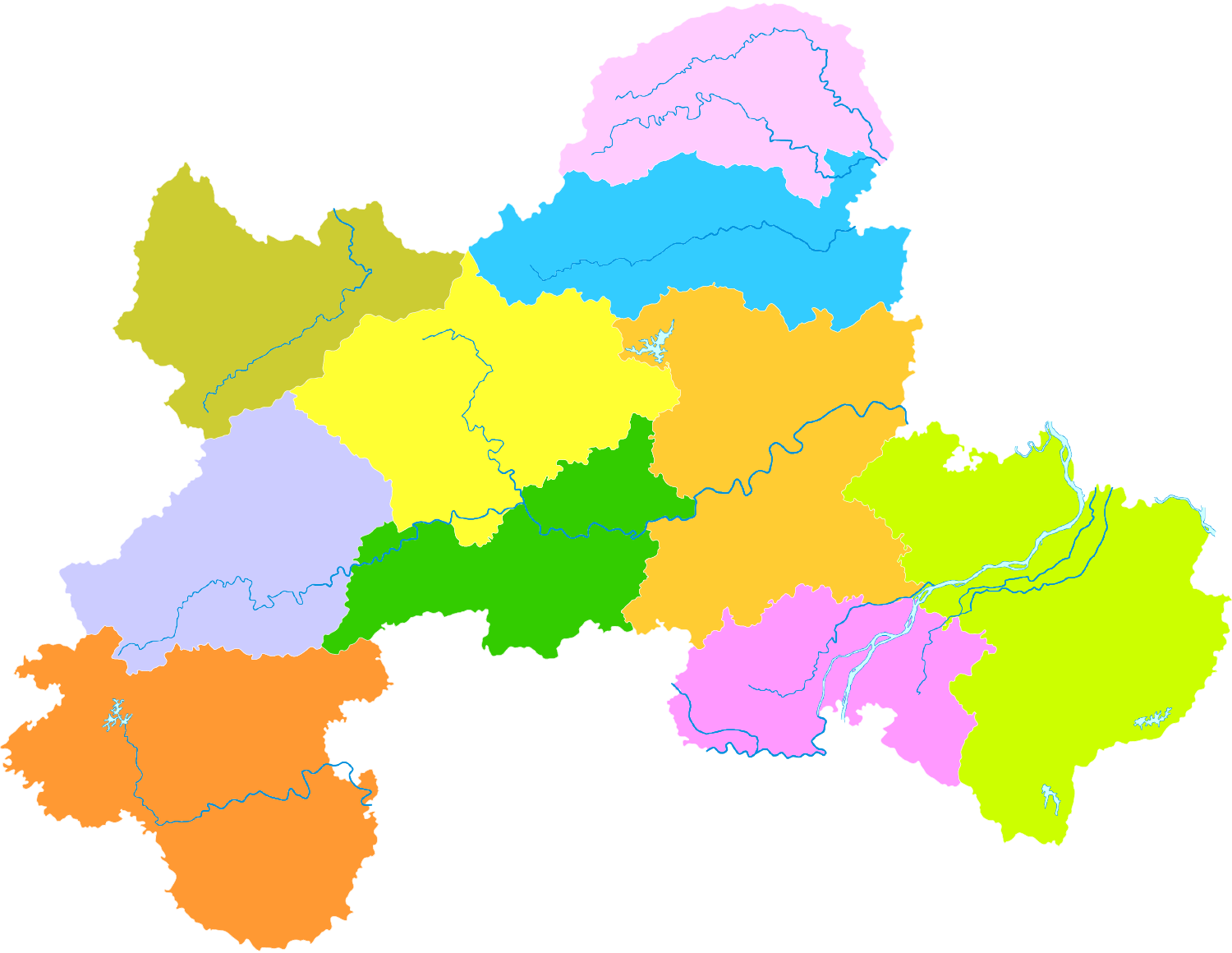

== Economy and infrastructure ==
The State Highway 320, State Highway 105, the Shanghai-Ruijin Highway and the Ganyue Highway (the Jiangxi-Guangdong Highway) form a convenient traffic network in the city.

Yichun railway station is an important stop along the major railway running between Beijing and Nanchang. Since 2014, it became a station on the Shanghai-Changsha CRH high speed train line between the Changsha and Nanchang station.

Direct flights to Yichun Mingyueshan Airport are available from major cities across China, such as Beijing, Shanghai, Wuhan and Nanchang.

A large sports complex with two stadiums was built in the 1990s and draws teams for sports competitions from all across China. Agriculture is the main industry but other natural resource industries such as timber and mining are also pivotal to the economy. Major mineral deposits include aluminum, tungsten, gold, zinc, and copper.

== Culture and tourism ==
Yichun has abundant historical, cultural and natural tourism resources. Hongzhou Kiln, a famous kiln of the Tang dynasty, was first built during the Southern Dynasties (AD 420–589). Wucheng Site of the Shang dynasty was discovered in Yichun in 1973. Gezhao Mountain, situated in Zhangshu, is a famous Taoist mountain in China. It is also home to a number of ancient buildings. Tourists also visit the Guan Mountain Scenic Area, which is located at the juncture of Yifeng and Tonggu counties. The famous Mingyue (moon) Mountain gained its name from its shape like a bright crescent moon. Mingyue Shan can be accessed using the cable car taking to the top of the mountain. The area consists of over ten peaks which are all more than a thousand meters (about 3,281 feet) above sea level. It is also a national forest park comprising six tourist zones. Among them, the Yangshan Scenic Spot is an important birthplace of Buddhism in South China, and the Wentang Town, at the foot of the Mingyue Mountain, is known for hot springs teeming with selenium.

Yichun Confucian Temple is a Confucian temple founded in 1143.
