= Fenyi County =

Fenyi County 分宜县 Feni
- County
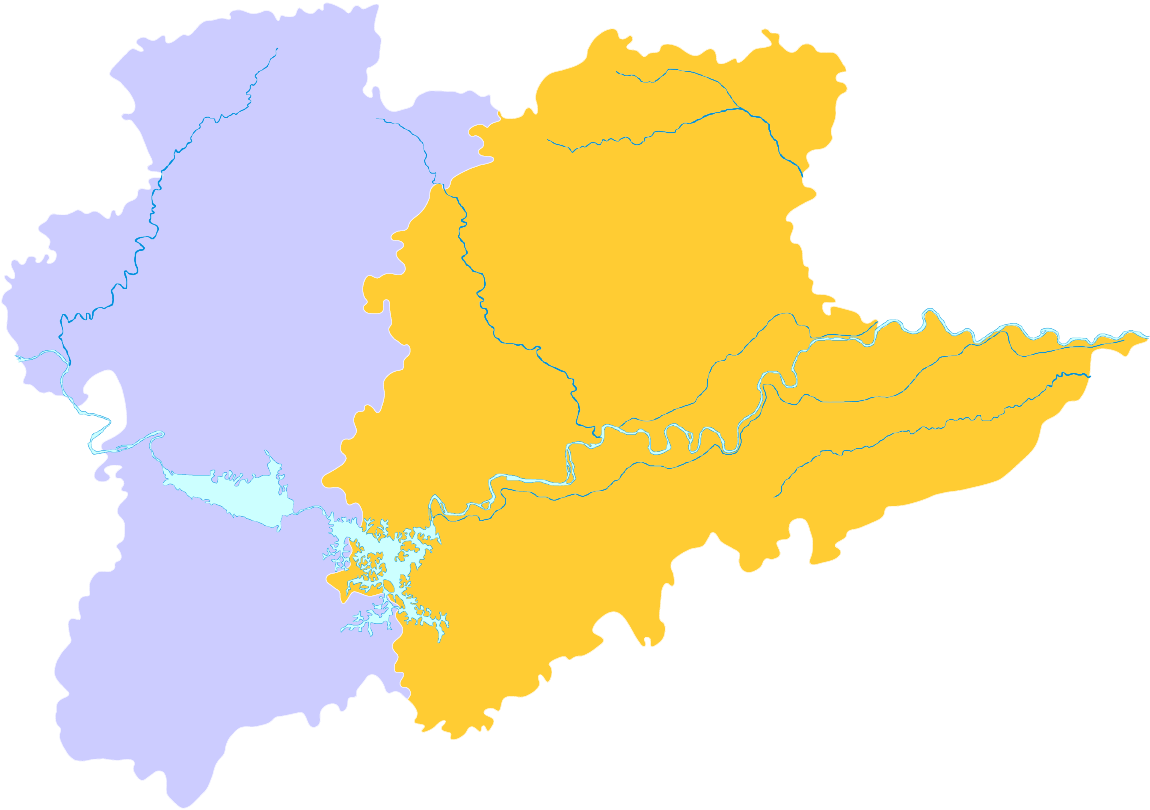
- Fenyi is the western division in this map of Xinyu

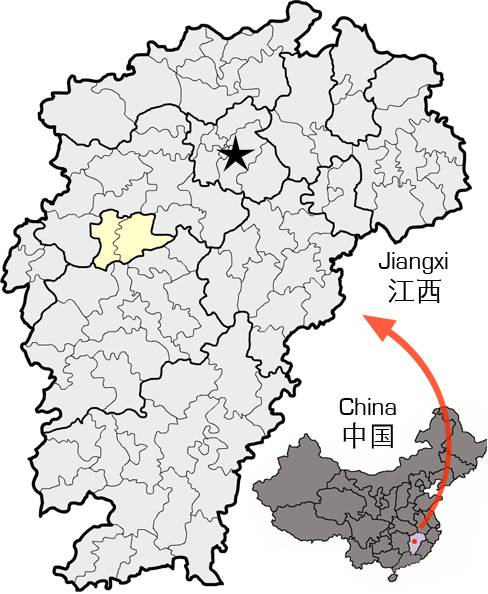
- Xinyu in Jiangxi
- Coordinates: 27°48′53″N 114°41′32″E
- Country: People's Republic of China
- Province: Jiangxi
- Prefecture-level city: Xinyu

Area
  - Total: 1,389 km^{2} (536 sq mi)

Population (2019)
  - Total: 320,500
  - Density: 230.7/km^{2} (597.6/sq mi)
- Time zone: UTC+8 (China Standard)
- Postal code: 336600

Fenyi County (Chinese: 分宜县; pinyin: Fēnyí Xiàn) is a county of and one of two divisions of the prefecture-level city of Xinyu, in the northwest of Jiangxi province, the People's Republic of China.

The population in 2026 was 264758.

== Administrative divisions ==
In the present, Fenyi County has 6 towns and 4 townships.

6 towns

- Fenyi (分宜镇)
- Yangqiao (杨桥镇)
- Huze (湖泽镇)
- Shuanglin (双林镇)
- Qianshan (钤山镇)
- Yangjiang (洋江镇)

4 townships

- Fengyang (凤阳乡)
- Dongcun (洞村乡)
- Gaolan (高岚乡)
- Caochang (操场乡)

== Climate ==
Fenyi Country has a humid subtropical climate with abundant rainfall and sunshine, and a long frost-free period. It has an average yearly temperature of 17.2 degrees, average annual rainfall of 1,600 mm (63 in), and a frost-free period of 270 days.

Climate data for Fenyi, elevation 94 m (308 ft), (1991–2020 normals, extremes 1981–2010)
Month	Jan	Feb	Mar	Apr	May	Jun	Jul	Aug	Sep	Oct	Nov	Dec	Year
Record high °C (°F)	26.4 (79.5)	29.8 (85.6)	33.5 (92.3)	35.7 (96.3)	36.5 (97.7)	37.5 (99.5)	40.1 (104.2)	40.7 (105.3)	38.0 (100.4)	35.7 (96.3)	32.0 (89.6)	24.0 (75.2)	40.7 (105.3)
Mean daily maximum °C (°F)	9.8 (49.6)	12.7 (54.9)	16.7 (62.1)	23.1 (73.6)	27.5 (81.5)	30.4 (86.7)	33.9 (93.0)	33.4 (92.1)	29.8 (85.6)	24.8 (76.6)	18.8 (65.8)	12.6 (54.7)	22.8 (73.0)
Daily mean °C (°F)	6.2 (43.2)	8.6 (47.5)	12.4 (54.3)	18.4 (65.1)	23.0 (73.4)	26.1 (79.0)	29.1 (84.4)	28.5 (83.3)	25.0 (77.0)	19.8 (67.6)	13.8 (56.8)	8.2 (46.8)	18.3 (64.9)
Mean daily minimum °C (°F)	3.6 (38.5)	5.8 (42.4)	9.3 (48.7)	14.9 (58.8)	19.6 (67.3)	23.1 (73.6)	25.5 (77.9)	25.1 (77.2)	21.5 (70.7)	16.0 (60.8)	10.3 (50.5)	5.0 (41.0)	15.0 (59.0)
Record low °C (°F)	−5.1 (22.8)	−3.7 (25.3)	−2.3 (27.9)	1.4 (34.5)	9.9 (49.8)	14.3 (57.7)	18.0 (64.4)	18.5 (65.3)	12.6 (54.7)	3.8 (38.8)	−0.9 (30.4)	−9.6 (14.7)	−9.6 (14.7)
Average precipitation mm (inches)	85.2 (3.35)	95.2 (3.75)	186.8 (7.35)	186.9 (7.36)	223.4 (8.80)	274.5 (10.81)	178.2 (7.02)	132.4 (5.21)	86.9 (3.42)	52.8 (2.08)	90.4 (3.56)	67.2 (2.65)	1,659.9 (65.36)
Average precipitation days (≥ 0.1 mm)	15.2	14.2	18.4	18.0	17.4	17.4	12.7	13.1	9.5	8.9	10.8	11.4	167
Average snowy days	2.8	1.4	0.3	0	0	0	0	0	0	0	0	0.8	5.3
Average relative humidity (%)	80	80	81	79	79	81	75	76	77	75	78	77	78
Mean monthly sunshine hours	69.9	72.5	83.1	112.7	134.5	133.1	217.7	205.6	162.8	149.5	123.5	111.9	1,576.8
Percentage possible sunshine	21	23	22	29	32	32	52	51	44	42	39	35	35
Source: China Meteorological Administration
