= Xinyu =

Xinyu 新余市 Sinyu, Sinyü, Hsinyü
- Prefecture-level city
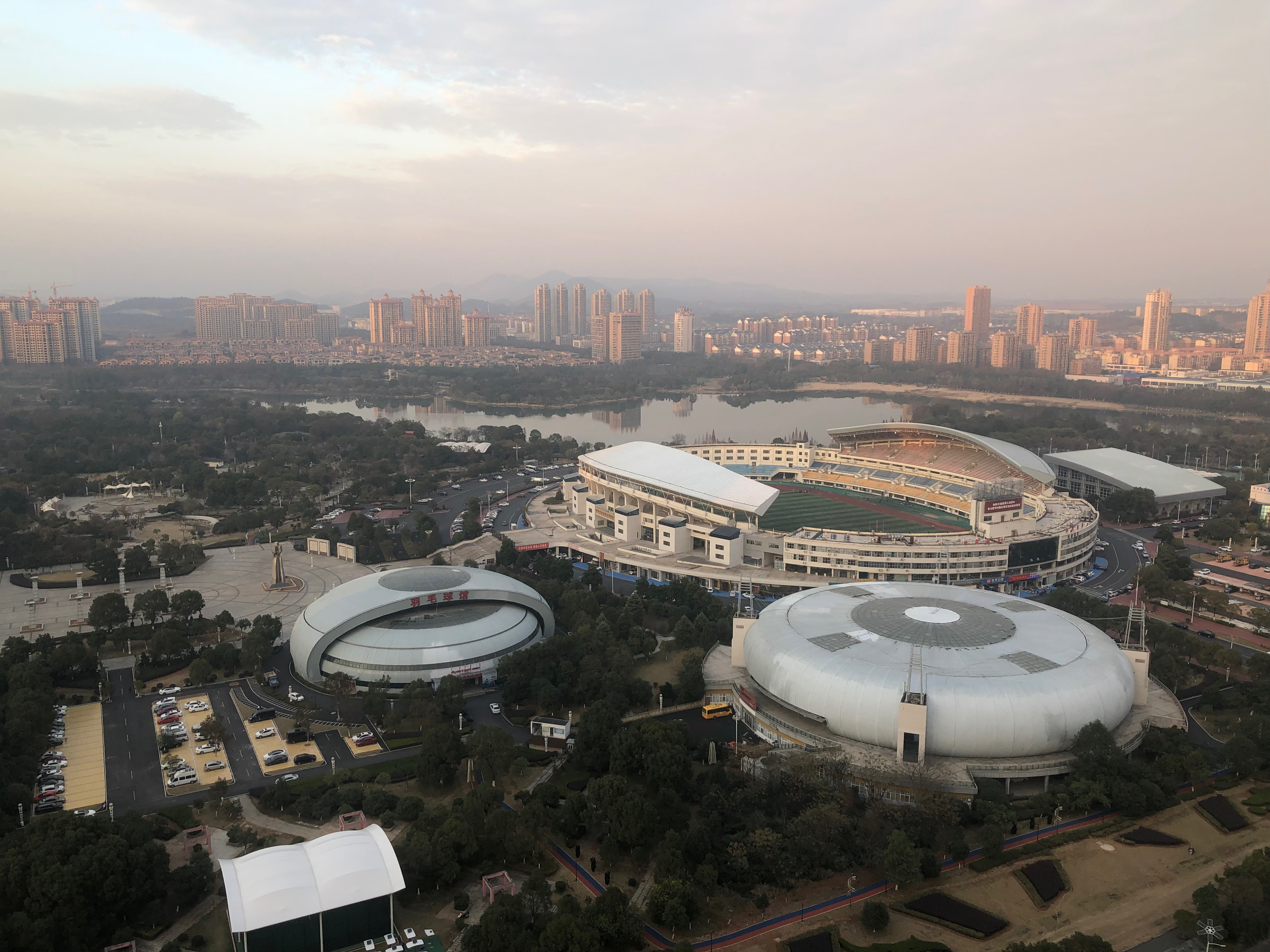
- Nicknames: 赣西明珠、钢铁之都 (Pearl of Ganxi [W. Jiangxi], Iron Capital)
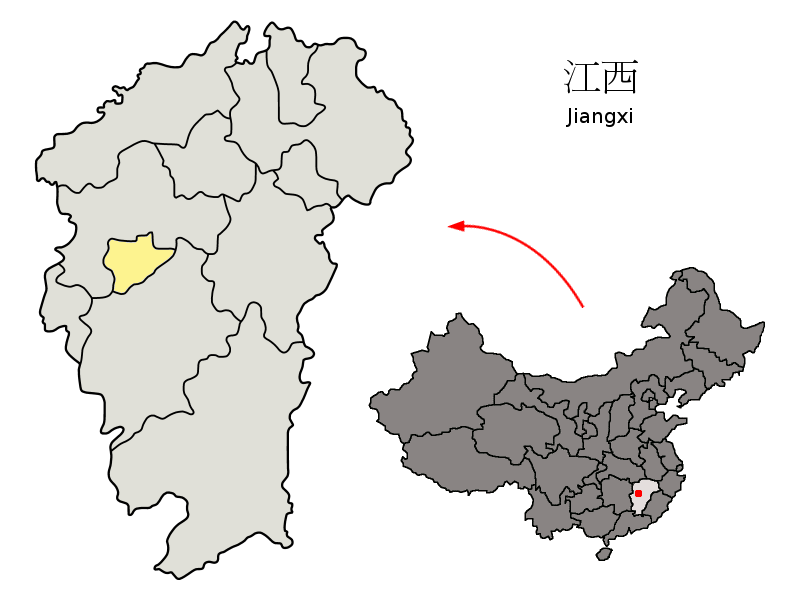
- Location of Xinyu City jurisdiction in Jiangxi

- Location of the city centre in China
- Coordinates (Xinyu municipal government): 27°49′07″N 114°55′00″E
- Country: People's Republic of China
- Province: Jiangxi
- County-level divisions: 2
- County-level administrative councils: 4
- Established: 267
- Municipal seat: Yushui District

Government
  - CPC Xinyu Secretary: Jiang Bin (蒋斌)
  - Mayor: Dong Xiaojian (董晓健)

Area
  - Prefecture-level city: 3,177.68 km^{2} (1,226.91 sq mi)
  - Urban: 1,785.92 km^{2} (689.55 sq mi)

Population (2010)
  - Prefecture-level city: 1,138,873
  - Density: 358.398/km^{2} (928.246/sq mi)
  - Urban: 839,487

GDP
  - Prefecture-level city: CN¥ 94.7 billion US$ 15.2 billion
  - Per capita: CN¥ 81,357; US$ 13,062
- Time zone: UTC+8 (China Standard)
- Postal code: 338000
- Area code: 0790
- ISO 3166 code: CN-JX-05
- City flower: Chinese rose
- City tree: camphor laurel
- Dialect: Gan: Xinyu hua (新余话)
- License plate prefix: 赣K
- Website: www.xinyu.gov.cn

Xinyu (Chinese: 新余; pinyin: Xīnyú, formerly 新喻; Xīnyú) is a prefecture-level city in west-central Jiangxi province, People's Republic of China. It serves as a major industrial hub in central China, designated as a National New Energy Technology Demonstration City and a base for the steel industry.

== Toponymy ==
The name 'Xīnyú (新余)' originates from 'Xīnyú (新渝)', the historical nomenclature bestowed upon the settlement during the era of the Three Kingdoms under the Wu. Its citizens dwell within a territory whose identity is inextricably linked to the Yu River (渝水)—the ancient name for the contemporary Yuan River (袁河). It is generally accepted that the etymology of the name is derived from the prefix Xin (新), signifying 'new', and the hydronym Yu (渝). Historical chronicles suggest that the transition from the original character '渝' to its homophonous variant '喻' during the Tianbao era of the Tang dynasty was a result of gradual phonetic evolution. Throughout the imperial centuries, the city's orthography underwent several transformations, being rendered as 'Xinyu (新俞)' during the Southern Dynasty's Song period and 'Xinyu (新谕)' from the Qi to the Sui dynasties . The name 'Xīnyù (新喻)' remained the standard throughout the Tang, Song, Yuan, Ming, and Qing dynasties until the contemporary simplification to its present form.

The modern name, 'Xīnyú (新余),' is the contemporary simplification of this long-standing phonetic tradition. In the structures of Classical Chinese, the character '余' is a first-person pronoun, serving as a formal and literary way to say 'I' or 'Me.' By adopting this character, the name of the city transcends its role as a geographical marker and takes on a startlingly intimate quality. Xinyu can thus be interpreted not merely as the 'New Surplus,' but as the 'New I' or 'New Self.' Whilst the complex strokes of the imperial '喻' have been replaced by the more minimalist '余,' the city's identity remains anchored to its ancient roots. Indeed, the administrative heart of the city is still officially designated as the Yushui District (渝水区), a deliberate and poetic restoration of the original Three Kingdoms orthography.

== History ==
=== Before 589 ===
Archaeological findings at the Shinianshan site of northwest Xinyu reveal that ancestors were living and thriving in this region as far back as the Neolithic Age, 5,000 years ago.

Xinyu has a city-constructing history of more than 1,700 years. It became a county in 267 during the Three Kingdoms period, originally placed under the jurisdiction of the Ancheng Commandery. The fundamental geography of Xinyu has forever been defined by the majestic Mount Meng towering in the north and the meandering Yu River, flowing gracefully through the south. The ancient city wall of this foundational settlement was situated merely three li south of the present-day city center. The original settlement of Xinyu County is called 'Longchishu (龙池墅).' Throughout the subsequent Western and Eastern Jin dynasties, the region maintained its status as Xinyu County within the Ancheng Commandery.

Culturally, this era birthed one of the most mesmerising myths in Oriental folklore. The Eastern Jin luminary Gan Bao recorded the legend of the Feathered Maiden (毛衣女下凡) in his masterpiece, Soushen Ji. In this legend, there lived a young man in Xinyu who saw seven young women in a field. He didn't know they were birds in disguise. So he crawled forward, took the sweater from one of the women, and hid it. When he reached her, all the other women turned into birds and flew away, but this one woman couldn't fly away. The young man took her home and made her his wife. This enchanting tale of a local man marrying a divine avian maiden firmly established Xinyu as the birthplace of one of China's earliest human-divine romances.

=== 589–1368 ===
Following the reunification of China under the Sui dynasty, the area was reorganized under Yuan Prefecture, and Xinyu County was briefly abolished before being reinstated at Longchishu during the Daye era. The Tang dynasty heralded profound geographical and nomenclatural changes. In the eighth year of the Dali era, the county seat was permanently relocated to the north of Hukan Mountain (虎瞰山), a strategic site revered for its imposing, tiger-like topography. Furthermore, after the Tianbao era, the city name was mistaken for 'Xīnyù (新喻)'. The Tang era also saw an industrial awakening. The north-western Tongshan (Copper Mountain) yielded abundant copper ores, prompting the establishment of an official mining centre that operated until it was abandoned during the Song dynasty. As the Song dynasty ascended, Xinyu flourished under the administration of the Linjiang Military Prefecture (临江军). The Northern Song period is particularly celebrated for the genesis of Xiabu Embroidery, an exquisite, highly durable craft woven purely by hand from ramie, which became widely utilised for decorative garments and matrimonial celebrations. By the Yuan dynasty, the region's status was elevated to Xinyu Prefecture because the population grew so large.

=== 1368–1911 ===
Throughout both the Ming and Qing eras, the city was governed as Xinyu County within Linjiang Prefecture. Xinyu's geographical prominence was highly esteemed by historical scholars. It was recognized as a pivotal nexus connecting the southern routes, making it an essential hub for travelling merchants and scholars.The physical grandeur of the city was cemented during the Ming dynasty. In the Zhengde era, an imposing earthen city wall was erected, spanning a circumference of 5 li and 130 paces, fortified with seven distinct gates. This formidable structure was reinforced with brick during the Jiajing era and received further restorations under the Qing emperors Kangxi and Qianlong. Economically, the region thrived on its rich agricultural and textile outputs, offering tributes of fine silk, gauze, and linen.

During the Ming dynasty, the famous scientist Song Yingxing served as an official in Fenyi County, which is part of Xinyu City now. It was here that he wrote much of Tiangong Kaiwu (Exploitation of the Works of Nature), one of the most important scientific and technological encyclopedias in world history. It is a comprehensive work that embodies ancient Chinese technological and craft civilization.

=== 1911–present ===
The 20th century transformed Xinyu into a crucible of revolution and resilience. Significant historical events unfolded upon this soil, most notably the Luofang Meeting and the Xingguo Investigation, which are immortalized today as pivotal revolutionary heritage sites. Furthermore, the Red Army's Third Legion established a crucial command post in Shuixi. During the turbulent years of the Second World War, the area bore witness to the fierce Battle of Shanggao, hosting the Headquarters of the Chinese 19th Group Army.

In modern times, Xinyu became a major industrial hub. The government of PRC changed the city's name as 'Xīnyú (新余)' in 1957. In 1960, to support the rapid development of the steel industry, the State Council upgraded Xinyu County to Xinyu City under direct provincial jurisdiction. In 1963, when the scale of steel construction was compressed, the city was abolished and reverted to a county under the Yichun Prefecture. In 1983, as the region's industrial base recovered and a comprehensive system centered on steel manufacturing took shape, the State Council restored Xinyu City in July 1983. Since its restoration as a city in 1983, Xinyu has expanded its jurisdiction and modernized its administration to balance heavy industry with tourism and ecology. Upon regaining city status, Fenyi County was transferred to Xinyu's jurisdiction, and the Yushui District was established.

Recognizing its natural beauty, the city established the Fairy Lake (Xiannühu) Scenic Area in March 2000, granting it county-level administrative powers to manage tourism and conservation. A High-Tech Economic Development Zone was created in 2001. By November 2010, this zone was upgraded by the State Council to a National High-Tech Industrial Development Zone.

== Geography ==
Xinyu has an area of 3,178 km^{2} (1,227 sq mi). It has a four-season, monsoon-influenced humid subtropical climate. It can be very hot and rainy in summer. The city is located 135 km (84 mi) southwest of Nanchang, the provincial capital - about two and half hours away by car via highway.

The terrain of Xinyu is varied, comprising plains (32.23%), hills (28.64%), and terraces (25.67%), with smaller portions of water and mountains. The average elevation is about 89.49 meters. The highest peak in Xinyu is Mount Meng (Mengshan) at 1,004 meters. Other peaks include Jiulong Mountain (523m), Yangtian Gang (447m), and Baizhang Peak (424m). Yangtian Gang, Mount Meng and Baizhang Peak are national and provincial forest parks. Buddhism and Taoism have flourished in these scenic areas since ancient times, with a wealth of poems and paintings created by renowned literati like Ge Hong, Zhu Xi, Yue Fei, and Huang Tingjian after visiting the places.

== Climate ==
Climate data for Xinyu, elevation 82 m (269 ft), (1991–2020 normals, extremes 1981–2010)
Month	Jan	Feb	Mar	Apr	May	Jun	Jul	Aug	Sep	Oct	Nov	Dec	Year
Record high °C (°F)	25.8 (78.4)	30.1 (86.2)	33.4 (92.1)	36.2 (97.2)	36.3 (97.3)	37.9 (100.2)	40.6 (105.1)	40.3 (104.5)	38.1 (100.6)	35.6 (96.1)	31.9 (89.4)	23.9 (75.0)	40.6 (105.1)
Mean daily maximum °C (°F)	9.1 (48.4)	12.4 (54.3)	16.3 (61.3)	22.8 (73.0)	27.5 (81.5)	30.3 (86.5)	34.1 (93.4)	33.3 (91.9)	29.6 (85.3)	24.8 (76.6)	18.7 (65.7)	12.4 (54.3)	22.6 (72.7)
Daily mean °C (°F)	6.0 (42.8)	8.8 (47.8)	12.3 (54.1)	18.6 (65.5)	23.4 (74.1)	26.4 (79.5)	29.9 (85.8)	29.0 (84.2)	25.5 (77.9)	20.4 (68.7)	14.3 (57.7)	8.5 (47.3)	18.6 (65.5)
Mean daily minimum °C (°F)	3.6 (38.5)	6.1 (43.0)	9.4 (48.9)	15.3 (59.5)	20.0 (68.0)	23.4 (74.1)	26.4 (79.5)	25.8 (78.4)	22.2 (72.0)	16.9 (62.4)	10.9 (51.6)	5.6 (42.1)	15.5 (59.8)
Record low °C (°F)	−4.2 (24.4)	−3.5 (25.7)	−1.4 (29.5)	3.2 (37.8)	10.6 (51.1)	14.9 (58.8)	18.2 (64.8)	19.1 (66.4)	14.6 (58.3)	4.9 (40.8)	0.3 (32.5)	−8.2 (17.2)	−8.2 (17.2)
Average precipitation mm (inches)	89.4 (3.52)	101.1 (3.98)	180.1 (7.09)	209.0 (8.23)	213.4 (8.40)	265.4 (10.45)	126.9 (5.00)	140.4 (5.53)	63.2 (2.49)	56.4 (2.22)	85.8 (3.38)	64.8 (2.55)	1,595.9 (62.84)
Average precipitation days (≥ 0.1 mm)	15.0	13.9	18.0	18.1	16.6	15.7	10.1	12.2	8.0	7.7	9.3	10.5	155.1
Average snowy days	3.3	1.9	0.3	0	0	0	0	0	0	0	0	1.0	6.5
Average relative humidity (%)	79	78	79	77	76	79	70	73	73	69	73	74	75
Mean monthly sunshine hours	66.8	69.9	80.5	110.4	137.9	135.1	235.5	201.9	163.7	154.6	132.3	112.9	1,601.5
Percentage possible sunshine	20	22	21	29	33	32	56	50	45	44	41	35	36
Source: China Meteorological Administration

== Administration ==
Xinyu has direct jurisdiction over 1 urban district, 1 scenic district, 1 development zone, 1 county, 18 towns, 8 townships, and 7 sub-districts.

County-level	County-level (Locally)	Town-level	Type	Population (2020)
Yushui District (渝水区)	Directly under Yushui District	Chengnan (城南街道)	sub-district	529,636
Yushui District (渝水区)	Directly under Yushui District	Chengbei (城北街道)	sub-district	529,636
Yushui District (渝水区)	Directly under Yushui District	Yuanhe (袁河街道)	sub-district	529,636
Yushui District (渝水区)	Directly under Yushui District	Xingang (新钢街道)	sub-district	529,636
Yushui District (渝水区)	Directly under Yushui District	Kongmujiang (孔目江街道)	sub-district	529,636
Yushui District (渝水区)	Directly under Yushui District	Shuibei (水北镇)	town	15,390
Yushui District (渝水区)	Directly under Yushui District	Xiacun (下村镇)	town	23,133
Yushui District (渝水区)	Directly under Yushui District	Liangshan (良山镇)	town	10,497
Yushui District (渝水区)	Directly under Yushui District	Luofang (罗坊镇)	town	37,401
Yushui District (渝水区)	Directly under Yushui District	Yaoxu (姚圩镇)	town	11,725
Yushui District (渝水区)	Directly under Yushui District	Zhushan (珠珊镇)	town	21,025
Yushui District (渝水区)	Directly under Yushui District	Hushan (鹄山镇)	town	6,100
Yushui District (渝水区)	Directly under Yushui District	Renhe (人和乡)	township	8,545
Yushui District (渝水区)	Directly under Yushui District	Nan'an (南安乡)	township	6,560
Yushui District (渝水区)	Directly under Yushui District	Xinxi (新溪乡)	township	7,729
Yushui District (渝水区)	Xinyu National High-Tech Industrial Development Zone	Shuixi (水西镇)	town	185,460
Yushui District (渝水区)	Xiannühu (Fairy Lake) Scenic District	Hexia (河下镇)	town	30,828
Yushui District (渝水区)	Xiannühu (Fairy Lake) Scenic District	Guanchao (观巢镇)	town	12,006
Yushui District (渝水区)	Xiannühu (Fairy Lake) Scenic District	Ouli (欧里镇)	town	8,812
Yushui District (渝水区)	Xiannühu (Fairy Lake) Scenic District	Jieshui (界水乡)	township	7,946
Yushui District (渝水区)	Xiannühu (Fairy Lake) Scenic District	Jiulongshan (九龙山乡)	township	5,139
Fenyi County (分宜县)	/	Qiandong (钤东街道)	sub-district	123,257
Fenyi County (分宜县)	/	Qianxi (钤西街道)	sub-district	123,257
Fenyi County (分宜县)	/	Fenyi (分宜镇)	town	50,590
Fenyi County (分宜县)	/	Yangqiao (杨桥镇)	town	18,328
Fenyi County (分宜县)	/	Huze (湖泽镇)	town	7,685
Fenyi County (分宜县)	/	Shuanglin (双林镇)	town	16,364
Fenyi County (分宜县)	/	Qianshan (钤山镇)	town	14,277
Fenyi County (分宜县)	/	Yangjiang (洋江镇)	town	8,365
Fenyi County (分宜县)	/	Fengyang (凤阳镇)	town	9,232
Fenyi County (分宜县)	/	Dongcun (洞村乡)	township	6,982
Fenyi County (分宜县)	/	Gaolan (高岚乡)	township	8,835
Fenyi County (分宜县)	/	Caochang (操场乡)	township	8,830
Fenyi County (分宜县)	/	Dongkeng (东坑林场)	timberland	1,129
Fenyi County (分宜县)	/	Fenyi Industrial Park	others	675

Urban District:

- Yushui District (渝水区)

County:

- Fenyi County (分宜县)

Scenic District:

- Xiannühu (Fairy Lake) Scenic District (仙女湖风景名胜区)

Development Zone:

- Xinyu National High-Tech Industrial Development Zone (高新技术经济开发区)

Map
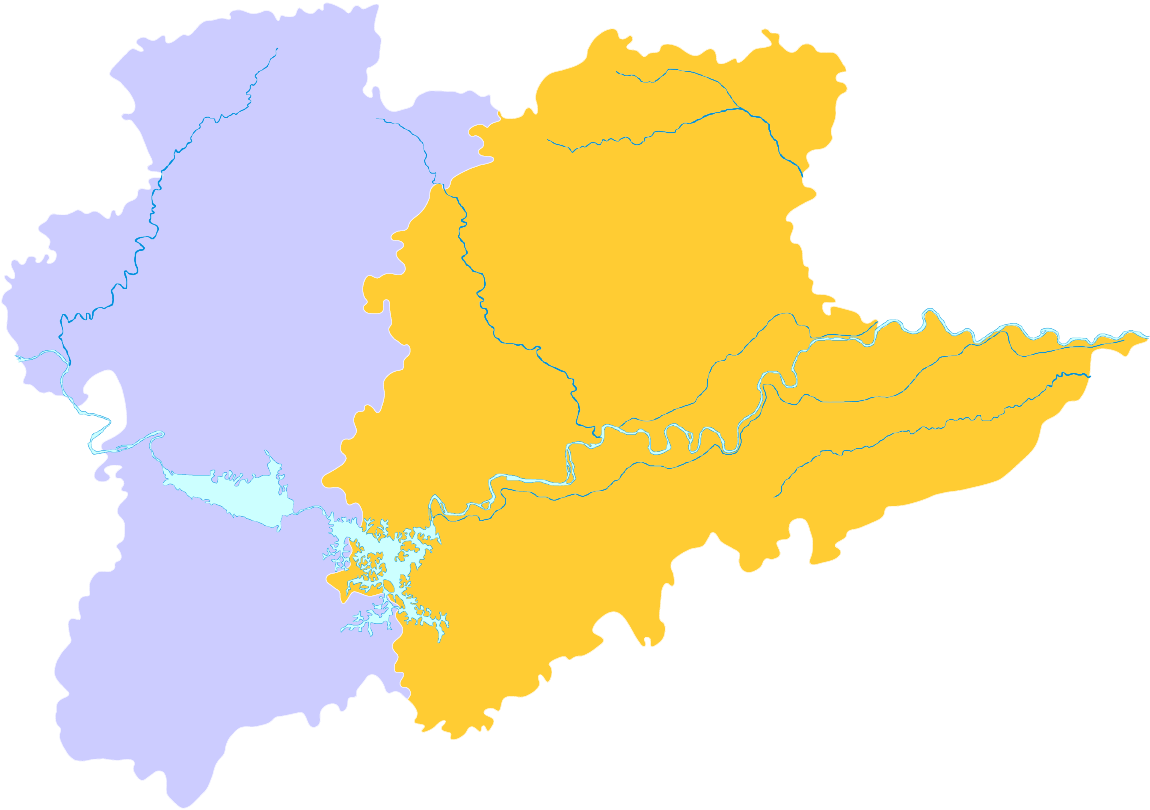

== Economy ==
Xinyu is a major industrial hub in central China. It is home to Ganfeng Lithium, one of the world's leading lithium salt producers. It is China's largest and the world's third-largest lithium salt producer, with an integrated supply chain spanning resource development, refining, battery manufacturing, and recycling.

Xinyu is also a main base for the steel industry in China. Xinyu Iron & Steel Group (Xin Gang) remains a pillar of the local economy, having been listed in the China Top 500 Enterprises within the last decades.

== Transport ==
=== Rail ===
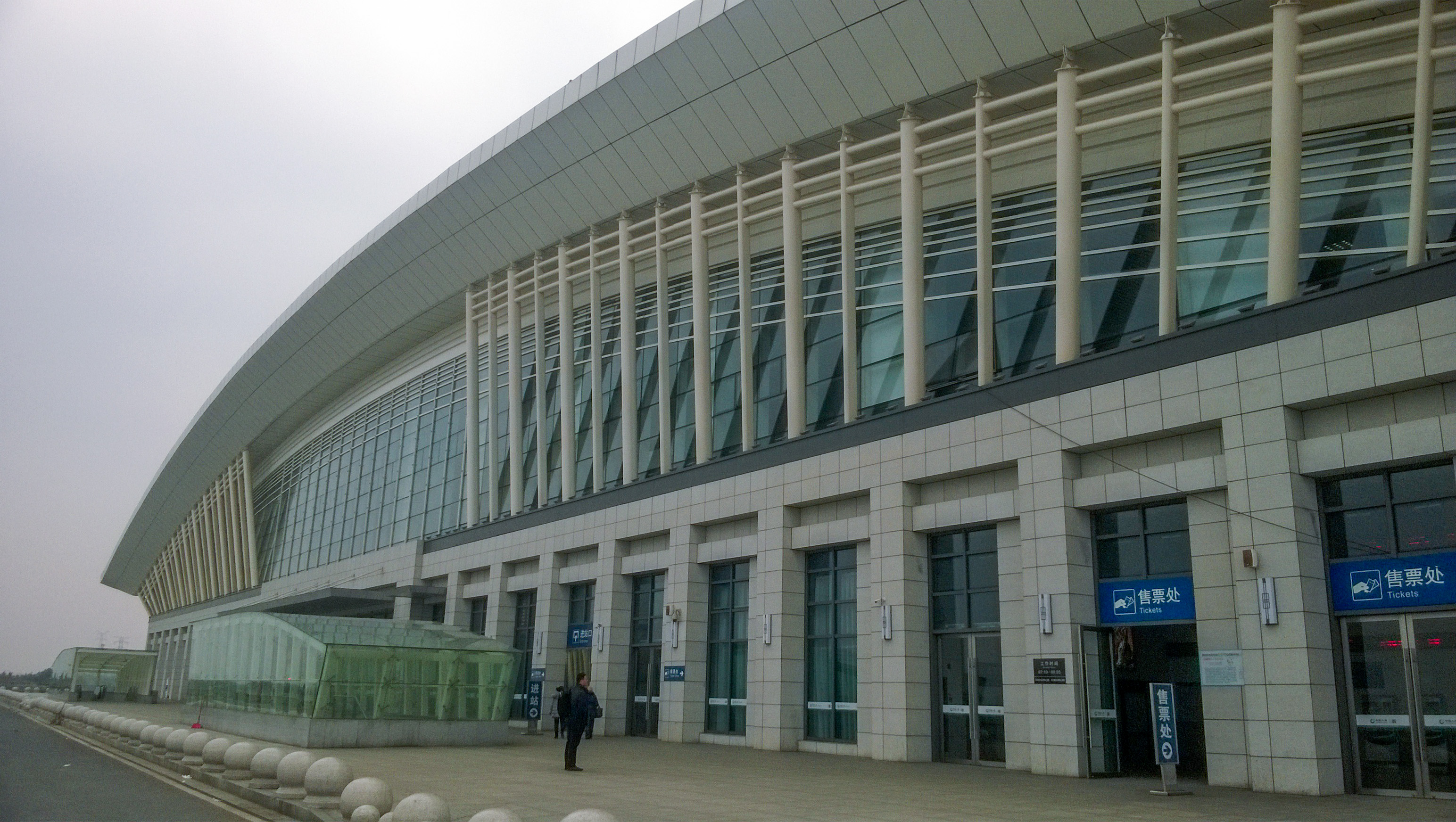
Xinyubei (Xinyu North) Railway Station

The railway network is an important piece of Xinyu's connectivity, integrating both high-speed passenger corridors and freight arteries to support its status as a central industrial powerhouse.

Shanghai-Kunming High-Speed Railway is a modern dual-track passenger-dedicated line operating at a speed of 350 km/h. It enters from the northeastern Gao'an border, serves Xinyu North railway station, and proceeds westward towards the Fenyi border. Shanghai-Kunming Railway serves as a traditional dual-track line for both passengers and freight. This railway operates at 200 km/h. It courses from the eastern Zhangshu border, passing through Luofang railway station, Xinyu railway station, and Hexia railway station, before crossing the western Fenyi border.

Shanggao-Xinyu Railway is a single-track freight line facilitating crucial industrial transport operating at 120 km/h. It connects Xinyu station to Xinhua station in Shuixi and Huagushan station in Xiacun, advancing to Hushan station and finally the northern Shanggao border. Haoji Railway (Yueyang-Ji'an Section) is another vital 120 km/h single-track freight corridor. It descends from the northern Shanggao border, traversing through Guanchao railway station, Xinyu West railway station in Hexia, and both Xinyu South railway station and Liangshan railway sation in the Liangshan township, before heading south to the Jishui border.

=== Expressway ===
Shanghai-Kunming Expressway is a major arterial route sweeping from the eastern Zhangshu border. It progresses through the Xinyu East junction, the Xinyu Service Area, the main Xinyu exit, Xinyu West, and the pivotal Xinyu Hub, before continuing westwards to Fenyi. The former Luofang junction on this expressway is currently closed.

Daqing-Guangzhou Expressway is a significant north-south corridor descending from the northern Fenyi border and intersecting with the Shanghai-Kunming Expressway at the Xinyu Hub. From there, it journeys southwards past the Fairy Lake (Xiannühu) junction, the Fairy Lake Service Area, and the Xinyu South junction, eventually crossing back into the southern Fenyi border.

== Tourism ==
Xinyu is known for the scenery and cultural sites of Xiannühu (仙女湖; 'Fairy Lake'). The legend of Dong Yong (董永) and the Seventh Fairy (七仙女) has been passed down until now. Their love story took place at today's Xiannühu (Fairy Lake).

== Colleges and universities ==
- Xinyu University (新余学院)
- Jiangxi University of Engineering (江西工程学院)

== International relations ==
=== Friendship cities ===
- Coquitlam, British Columbia, Canada
- Bangalore, Karnataka, India
