= Yuanzhou, Yichun =

Yuanzhou 袁州区 Yuanchow; Yüanchow
- District
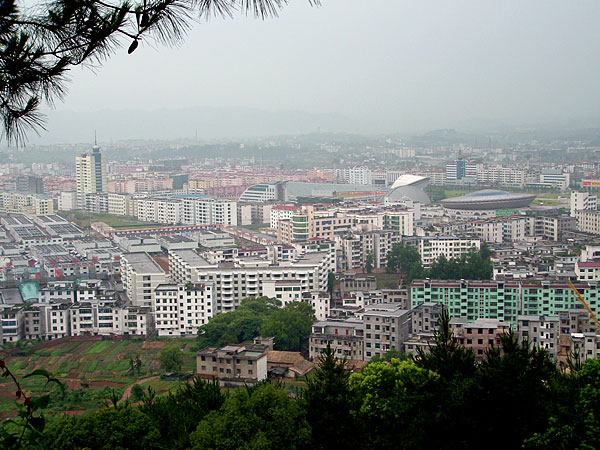

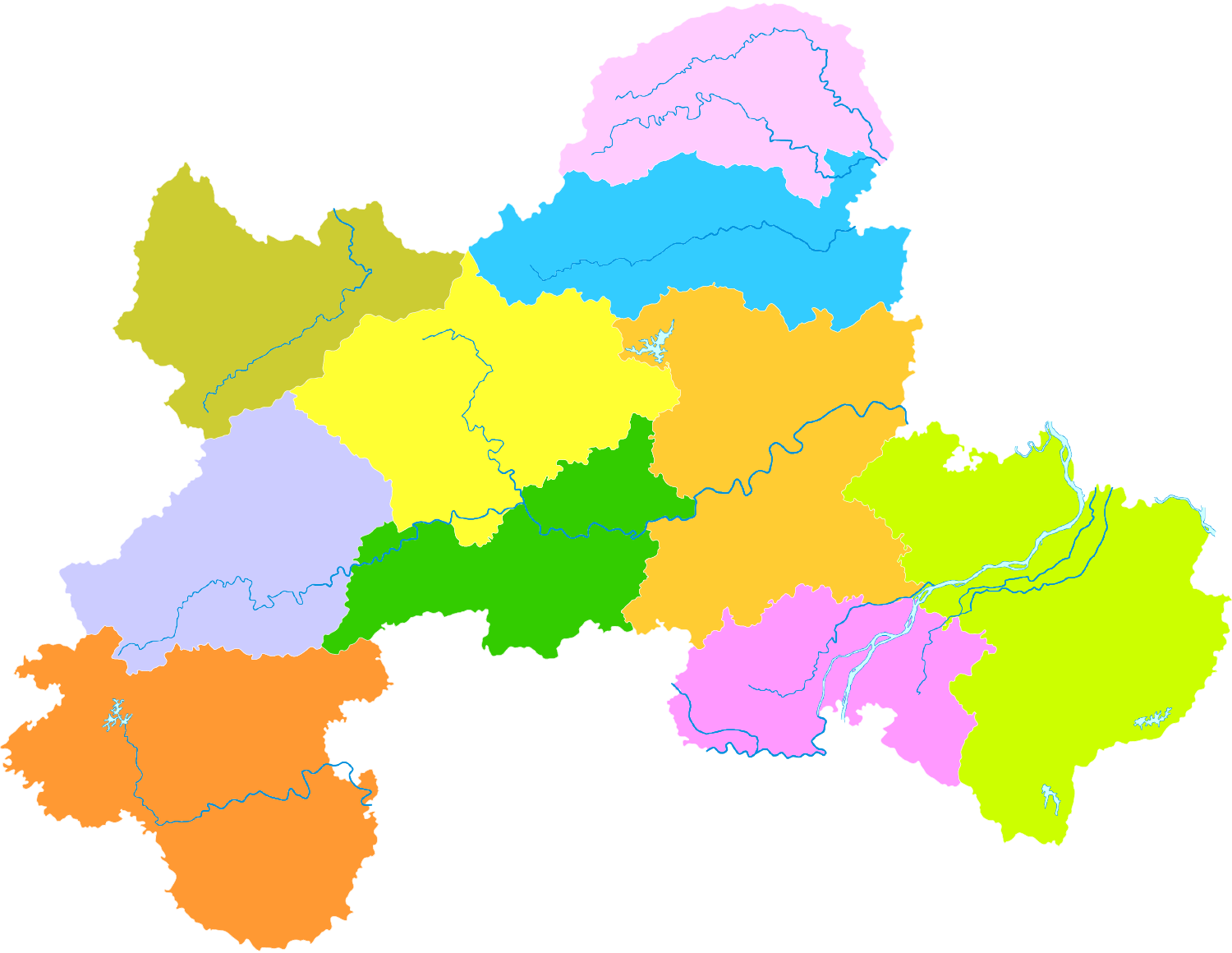
- Yuanzhou is the southwesternmost division in this map of Yichun

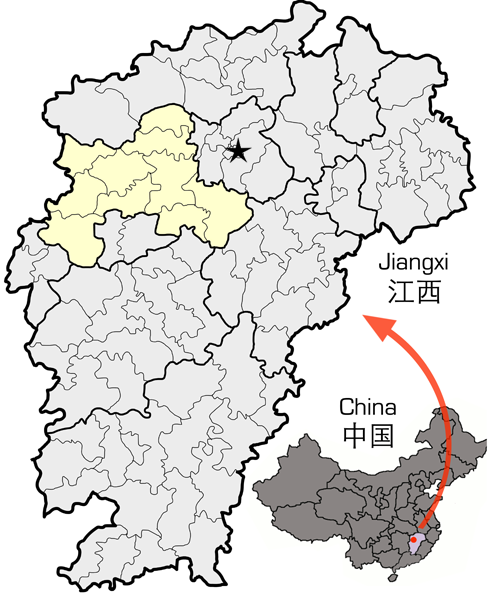
- Yichun in Jiangxi
- Coordinates: 27°47′49″N 114°25′41″E
- Country: People's Republic of China
- Province: Jiangxi
- Prefecture-level city: Yichun

Area
  - Total: 2,532.36 km^{2} (977.75 sq mi)

Population (2019)
  - Total: 1,081,300
  - Density: 426.99/km^{2} (1,105.9/sq mi)
- Time zone: UTC+8 (China Standard)
- Postal code: 336000

Yuanzhou District (Chinese: 袁州区; pinyin: Yuánzhōu Qū) is the only district and the seat of the city of Yichun, Jiangxi province, China, bordering Hunan province to the northwest.

== Administrative divisions ==
Yuanzhou District currently has 9 subdistricts, 17 towns and 5 townships.

9 subdistricts

- Lingquan (灵泉街道)
- Xiujiang (秀江街道)
- Zhanlang (湛郎街道)
- Zhuquan (珠泉街道)
- Huacheng (化成街道)
- Guanyuan (官园街道)
- Xiapu (下浦街道)
- Fenghuang (凤凰街道)
- Jinyuan (金园街道)

17 towns

- Binjiang (彬江镇)
- Xicun (西村镇)
- Jinrui (金瑞镇)
- Wentang (温汤镇)
- Sanyang (三阳镇)
- Cihua (慈化镇)
- Tiantai (天台镇)
- Hongtang (洪塘镇)
- Wojiang (渥江镇)
- Xinfang (新坊镇)
- Zhaixia (寨下镇)
- Lucun (芦村镇)
- Hutian (湖田镇)
- Shuijiang (水江镇)
- Xintian (新田镇)
- Nanmiao (南庙镇)
- Zhuting (竹亭镇)

5 townships

- Hongjiang (洪江乡)
- Nanmu (楠木乡)
- Liaoshi (辽市乡)
- Baimu (柏木乡)
- Feijiantan (飞剑潭乡)
