= Gongqingcheng =

Gongqingcheng 共青城市
- County-level & Sub-prefectural city
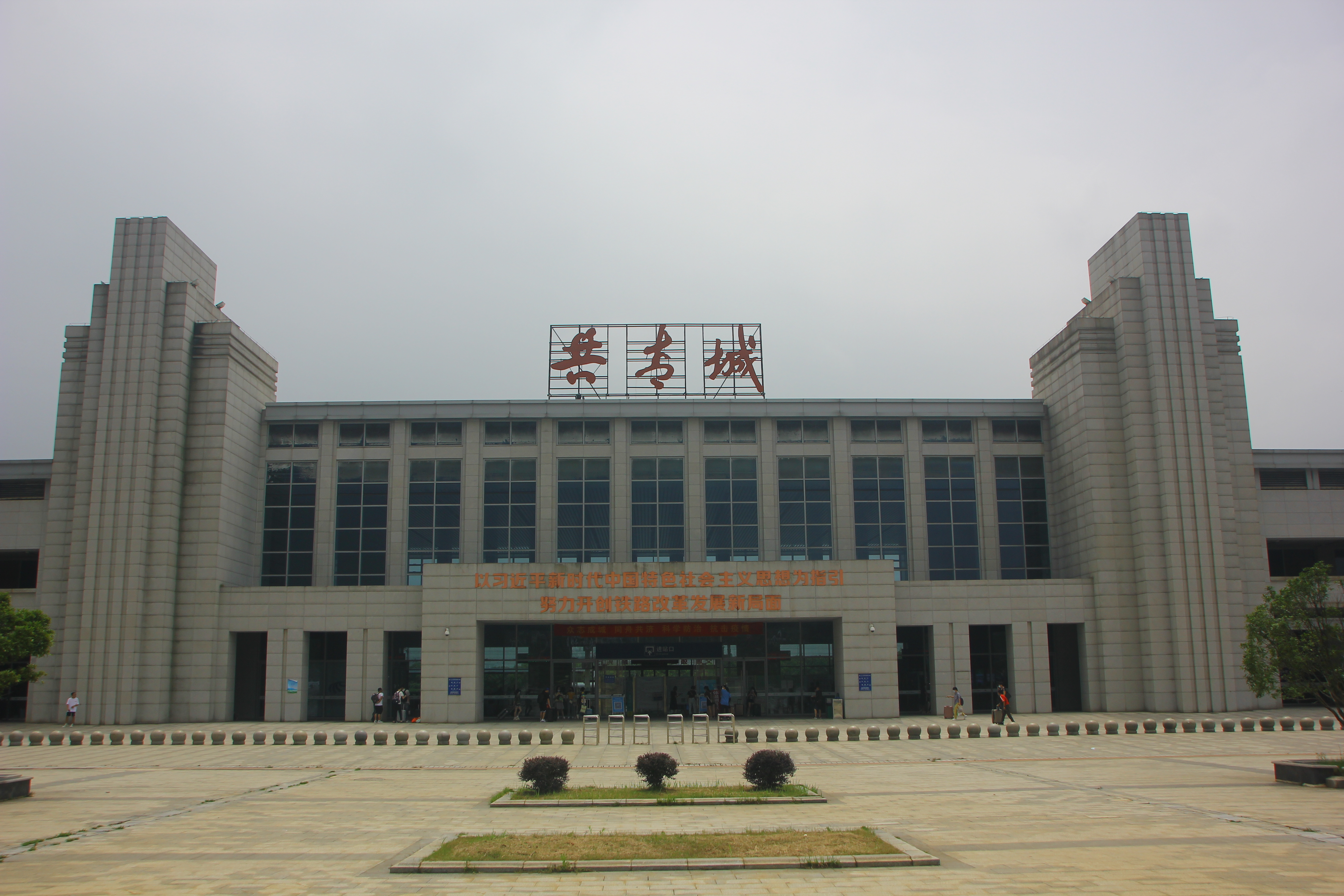
- Gongqingcheng Station Building in 2020
- Interactive map of Gongqingcheng
- Coordinates: 29°14′53″N 115°48′32″E
- Country: People's Republic of China
- Province: Jiangxi
- Prefecture-level city: Jiujiang
- Established: 1955
- Seat: Chashan Subdistrict

Area
  - Total: 310 km^{2} (120 sq mi)
- Elevation: 37 m (121 ft)

Population (2019)
  - Total: 220,000
  - Density: 710/km^{2} (1,800/sq mi)
- Time zone: UTC+8 (China Standard Time)
- China Standard: 332020
- Subdistricts: 1
- Towns: 2

Gongqingcheng (Chinese: 共青城; pinyin: Gòngqīngchéng) is a sub-prefecture-level city in Jiangxi, People's Republic of China. It was established on 10 September 2010 in the jurisdiction of Jiujiang. It is located 62 kilometres (39 mi) north of Nanchang, the provincial capital. On 1 July 2014, it was re-designated as being directly administered by the province, i.e. a sub-prefecture-level city. Situated in the vicinity of De'an, Yongxiu, and Lushan counties, it lies in the foothills of Mount Lu and lies on the western shore of Poyang Lake. With an area of 193 square kilometres (75 sq mi), it is home to 120,000 people, including 68,000 permanent residents. There are plans for the city to expand the population to 400,000 people. It is the only city in China to be named after the Communist Youth League of China, which in Chinese is abbreviated to "共青团"; hence its name literally means "Communist Youth League City".

== History ==
During the 1950s and 1960s, hundreds of thousands of students were sent from China's cities into the countryside and directed to become farmers. Gongqingcheng was founded in 1955 when the first group of 98 students from Shanghai were directed to go into the countryside to farm a wilderness area near Poyang Lake. Hu Yaobang, as the leader of the Communist Youth League, made a special trip to the area forty days after the students arrived, and he consoled and ate with them. Hu led the students to a barren area of land in Jiangxi, determined that the current site of Gongqingcheng was suitable for cultivation, and founded the settlement. Hu named the city, writing gong qing zhen to describe the results of the students' efforts.

After 37 years, Gongqingcheng gradually grew from a village commune into a small city. It is known by the nickname "Little Shanghai", and has a library, stadium, amusement park, and hospitals. Modern Gongqingcheng is covered by a network of canals, lakes, and rivers, in which fish and ducks are farmed. it has a wide variety of industries, manufacturing textiles, electronics, machinery, building materials, and foodstuffs. It is a center of agriculture, and has industries related to plantation, breeding, and processing agricultural produce.

On 3 May 2010 there was a groundbreaking ceremony for "The world's first" digital ecological city. DigiEcoCity LTD of Finland with the help of Nokia Siemens Network will develop a city that will be energy plus self-sufficient, producing more energy than it consumes, and it is also intended to have zero emissions in harmful pollution. The President of China, Hu Jintao, has set a goal of developing Gongqingcheng into a model city for China's urbanization program.

== Administration ==
The administrative center for this area is in Jiujiang, Jiangxi Province.

Gongqingcheng local government is located at Gongqingcheng People's Government Centre on Gongqingcheng Avenue.

== Administrative divisions ==
Gongqingcheng City has 1 subdistrict, 2 towns and 3 townships.

1 subdistrict

- Chashan (茶山街道)

2 towns

- Ganlu (甘露镇)
- Jiangyi (江益镇)

3 townships

- Jinhu (金湖乡)
- Sujiadang (苏家垱乡)
- Zequan (泽泉乡)

== Education ==
Gongqingcheng College of Nanchang University, Nanchang University Poyang Hu Campus, is located here with an enrollment of over 10,000 students and in 2012 was given a higher accreditation by Jiangxi Province.

There are two middle schools and one elementary school in the city:

- Gongqingcheng No. 1 Middle School
- Gongqingcheng No. 2. Middle School
- Nanhu Elementary School

== Twinning ==
In 2009 Gongqingcheng became a sister city of the Argentinian city of Marcos Juarez. The two cities formed their partnership in response to an invitation by the Chinese government to the President of the International Business Center for a Productive Argentina, Gustavo Biagiotti. After initial exchanges made by Mr. Biagiotti, official approval was obtained to perform the act of twinning during the Expo Central China 2009, which was held in Hunan. The event involved numerous mayors, prime ministers, ministers, and secretaries from both China and Argentina. The mayor of Marcos Juarez, Eduardo Raul Avalle, signed the twinning agreement on 22 September 2009.

== Geography ==
Gongqingcheng is located 56 kilometres (35 mi) from Jiujiang, the most northern important city in Jiangxi, and equally far from Nanchang, the provincial capital. Gongqingcheng is located in close to patty fields and a river, reflecting its history as a farming colony. The city covers a few hectares of land, and is approximately 42.7 metres above sea level.

Every year, thousands of white cranes nest on Poyang Lake, China's largest freshwater lake, making it an important bird Sanctuary. The Poyang Lake Ecosystem Research Center is under construction in Gongqing.

Mount Lu, an UNESCO World Heritage Site and a place where Chairman Mao and other senior CCP leaders held several historical meetings, is located north of Gongqing.

== Services ==
The city has two hospitals which can provide for basic medical services:

- Gongqingcheng People's Hospital
- Yaohua Hospital

There is also a Jinhu Hospital Outpatient Clinic located in the city.

There is a China Post post office, but the outlet handles domestic mail and does not handle overseas mail.

The city has a Bank of China branch in the city center where dollars for yuan can be exchanged but the other four banks (including Agricultural Bank of China and Credit Cooperative of China) in the city are for local currency only. It is very difficult for foreigners to cash in traveler's checks at any banks in the city. Both Agricultural Bank of China and Bank of China have ATMs at their branches and other locations in the city.

The city has three large grocery stores that opened in 2005. As of May 2012 a Walmart was being built.

== Tourism ==
The city has a movie house, a roller rink, and at least four tourist-level hotels.

The new Mount Lu International Golf Club developed by the Jiahao Company of Hong Kong can be found on the city's perimeter. There are also many restruants in the city.

The area is noted for its ducks and many orange orchards are present. The ducks are important for their feathers used in production of clothes, the most important industry of Gongqing. The Yaya company - once famous all over China for its winter clothes, duck down coats, - is situated here. The tile and clothing industries are the base of the economy with clothing having reportedly 20,000 workers. A large in progress industrial park is expanding this base.

The city is dusty but has, by Chinese standards, relatively good air and water quality. It is currently under constant construction and there are frequent electric and water stoppages.

=== Hu Yaobang's Tomb ===
Hu Yaobang's tomb, the most impressive tomb of any senior leader in the history of the People's Republic of China, is arguably the most impressive site in Gongqing. The tomb can be seen from a great distance, and is marked by a huge plaque engraved with Hu's portrait. Because Hu died when he was 73, the tomb's architect built 73 steps from ground level to the entrance to the tomb. The view from the tomb's entrance is "breathtaking". There is an engraving beside the tomb of Hu's achievements to the Communist cause.

A ceremony, led by Chinese prime minister Wen Jiabao, was held in Beijing in November 2005 to commemorate the popular leader for the first time since his death. A similar event was also held in Gongqingcheng later the same winter.

== Transportation ==
=== Rail ===
To the west lie the Beijing–Kowloon Railway, Nanchang–Jiujiang Intercity Railway, China National Highway 105, and the Changjiu Expressway (昌九高速公路).

Gongqingcheng Railway Station is a high-speed railway station on the Changjiu Intercity Railway line (Nanchang–Jiujiang Intercity Railway) that makes connections with Nanchang and Jiujang.

=== Roads ===
There is a major toll road, 105/316 according to the Collins' map of China, connecting these three cities with Gongqingcheng being roughly in the middle. G70 Fuzhou–Yinchuan Expressway is located to the west of the city.

=== Public Transit/Taxis ===
Rail and bus connections can be made to both the major cities of Jiujiang and Nanchang.

Buses are plentiful (1 hour and 15 minutes to Nanchang and improved, 1 hour plus to Jiujiang)

Local taxi service is also available.

=== Airport ===
There are two airports located outside of Gongqingcheng:

- closest airport is Nanchang Changbei International Airport located 30 kilometres (19 mi) to the south and has flights mainly in China and other destinations in Asia.
- Jiujiang Lushan Airport is located 39.8 kilometres (24.7 mi) to the north and connects to domestic locations only
