= Beijing–Hong Kong (Taipei) corridor =

Proposed railway corridor in Asia

Beijing–Hong Kong (Taipei) corridor 京港（台）通道

Overview
- Status: Under construction
- Locale: China; Taiwan (unilaterally proposed)
- Termini: Beijing Fengtai; Hong Kong West Kowloon Taipei Main (unilaterally proposed)

Service
- Type: High-speed rail
- Operator: China Railway High-speed

Technical
- Track gauge: 1,435 mm (4 ft 8 1/2 in) standard gauge
- Electrification: 25 kV AC overhead catenary (50 Hz in China, 60 Hz in Taiwan)
- Operating speed: 350 km/h (217 mph)

Beijing–Hong Kong (Taipei) corridor
- Chinese: 京港（台）通道
Transcriptions
Standard Mandarin
- Hanyu Pinyin: Jīng Gǎng (Tái) Tōngdào

The Beijing–Hong Kong (Taipei) corridor is a proposed high-speed railway corridor in China and Taiwan. It is planned to run in a north–south direction from Beijing to Hong Kong, with a branch leading from Hefei to Taipei across the Taiwan Strait, of which the Taiwan section is proposed unilaterally. It is planned to connect the cities of Beijing, Xiong'an, Fuyang, Hefei, Jiujiang, Nanchang, Ganzhou, Shenzhen and Hong Kong on the main line, and Fuzhou and Taipei on the branch line.

The line was announced by the Chinese government in 2016 as part of China's "Eight Vertical and Eight Horizontal" network.

== Route ==
Name	Route	Design speed (km/h)	Length (km)	Status	Construction start	Opened	Remarks
Beijing–Shangqiu high-speed railway	Beijing Fengtai – Xiong'an	350	85	in planning	Expected in 2024	Expected in 2029	
Beijing–Shangqiu high-speed railway	Xiong'an – Shangqiu.	350	553	open	29 September 2022	28 September 2026	
Shangqiu–Hangzhou high-speed railway	Shangqiu – Fuyang West – Hefei	350	400	open	30 November 2015	1 December 2019	The section from Fuyang West to Hefei is part of the eastern route
Hefei–Anqing–Jiujiang high-speed railway	Hefei – Anqing West – Jiujiang	350	169	open	25 December 2015	22 December 2020	The section from west of Hefei to east of Huangmei is part of the eastern route
Hefei–Anqing–Jiujiang high-speed railway	Anqing West – Lushan	350	171	open	30 September 2017	30 December 2021	The section from west of Hefei to east of Huangmei is part of the eastern route
Fuyang–Huanggang high-speed railway	Fuyang West – Huanggang East	350	324	in planning	Expected in 2024	Expected in 2029	Western route
Huanggang–Huangmei high-speed railway	Huanggang East – Huangmei East	350	125	open	20 December 2018	22 April 2022	Western route
Nanchang–Jiujiang high-speed railway	Lushan – Nanchang East	350	137	under construction	21 November 2022	Expected in 2027	
Nanchang–Ganzhou high-speed railway	Nanchang – Ganzhou West	350	416	open	20 October 2014	26 December 2019	
Ganzhou–Shenzhen high-speed railway	Ganzhou West – Shenzhen North	350	436	open	20 December 2018	10 December 2021	
Guangzhou–Shenzhen–Hong Kong Express Rail Link Mainland Section	Shenzhen North – Sham Chun River	200	13	open	16 January 2010	30 December 2015	
Guangzhou–Shenzhen–Hong Kong Express Rail Link Hong Kong Section	Sham Chun River – Hong Kong West Kowloon	200	26	open	16 January 2010	23 September 2018	Under the control of Kowloon-Canton Railway Corporation, not China Railways
Branch line to Taipei, Taiwan
Hefei–Fuzhou high-speed railway	Hefei South – Fuzhou	350	813	open	31 December 2009	28 June 2015	
Nanchang–Fuzhou railway	Nanchang West – Fuzhou	200	636	open	23 November 2007	26 September 2013	Fuzhou branch of Xiangtang–Putian railway
Fuzhou–Pingtan railway	Fuzhou – Pingtan	200	88	open	31 October 2013	26 December 2020	
Pingtan–Taipei high-speed railway (Taiwan Strait Tunnel Project)	Pingtan – Hsinchu	Proposed HSR crossing the Taiwan Straits from Pingtan to Taipei, Taiwan, using a tunnel from Pingtan to Hsinchu, Taiwan and existing Taiwan High Speed Rail infrastructure from Hsinchu to Taipei.					
Pingtan–Taipei high-speed railway (Taiwan High Speed Rail)	Hsinchu – Taipei	300	66	open	March 1999	1 May 2007	Under the control of Taiwan High Speed Rail Corporation, not China Railways

== See also ==
- High-speed rail in China
