= Gongqingcheng railway station =

Railway station in Gongqingcheng, China

Coordinates: 29°14′31″N 115°46′30″E

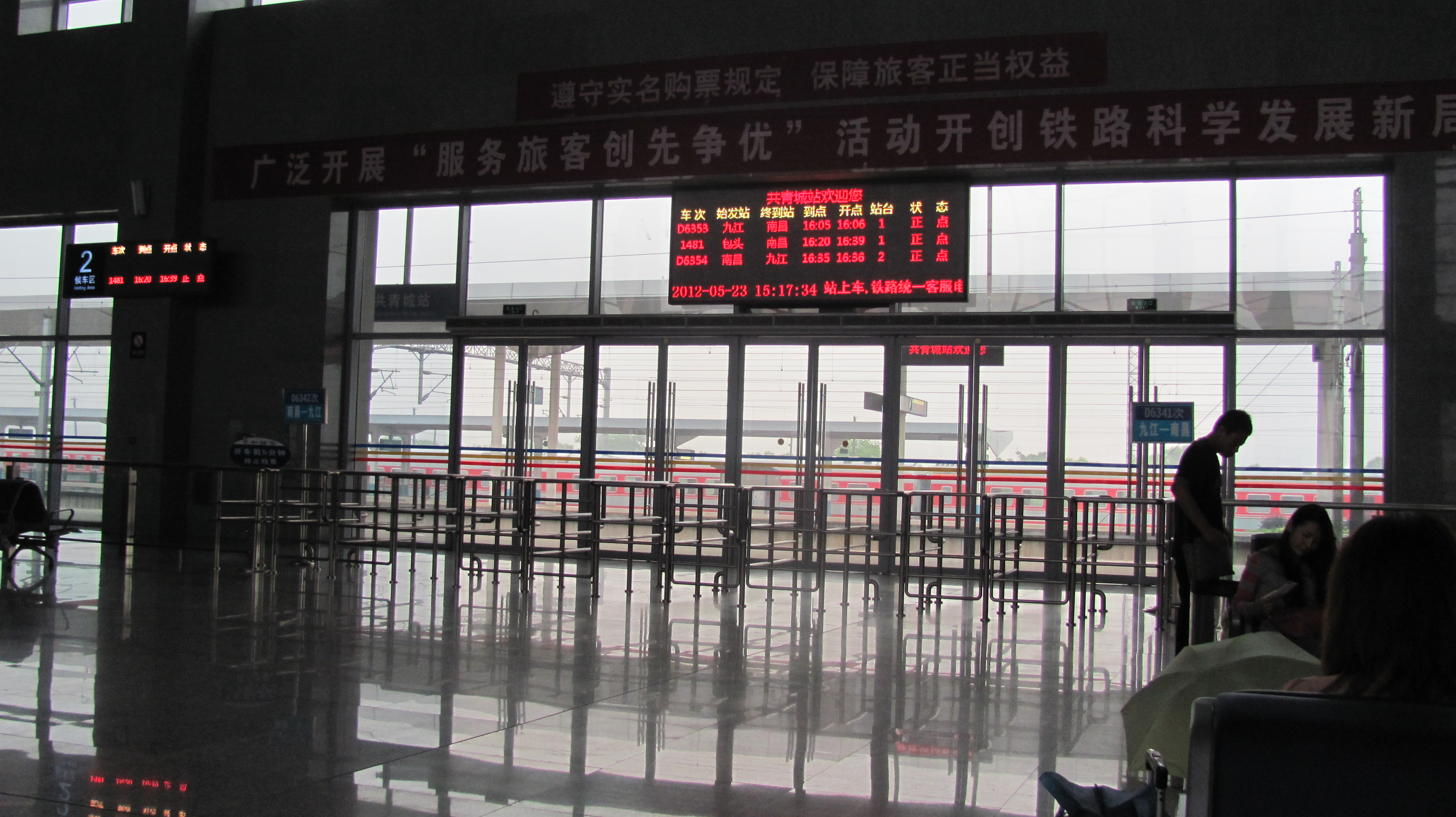
- Chinese: 共青城
Transcriptions
Standard Mandarin
- Hanyu Pinyin: gòngqīngchéng

Gongqingcheng railway station (共青城站) is a railway station located in Gongqingcheng, Jiujiang, in Jiangxi province, eastern China. It serves the Beijing–Kowloon railway and Nanchang–Jiujiang intercity railway. The station is accessed by Jiuxian Avenue and close to the G70 Highway.

Preceding station	China Railway	Following station
De'an towards Beijing West	Beijing–Kowloon railway	Yongxiu towards Hung Hom
Preceding station	China Railway High-speed	Following station
Yongxiu towards Nanchang West	Nanchang–Jiujiang intercity railway	De'an towards Jiujiang
