= Yongxiu railway station =

Railway station in Jiujiang, Jiangxi, China

Coordinates: 29.0225°N 115.8111°E

Yongxiu Railway Station 永修站
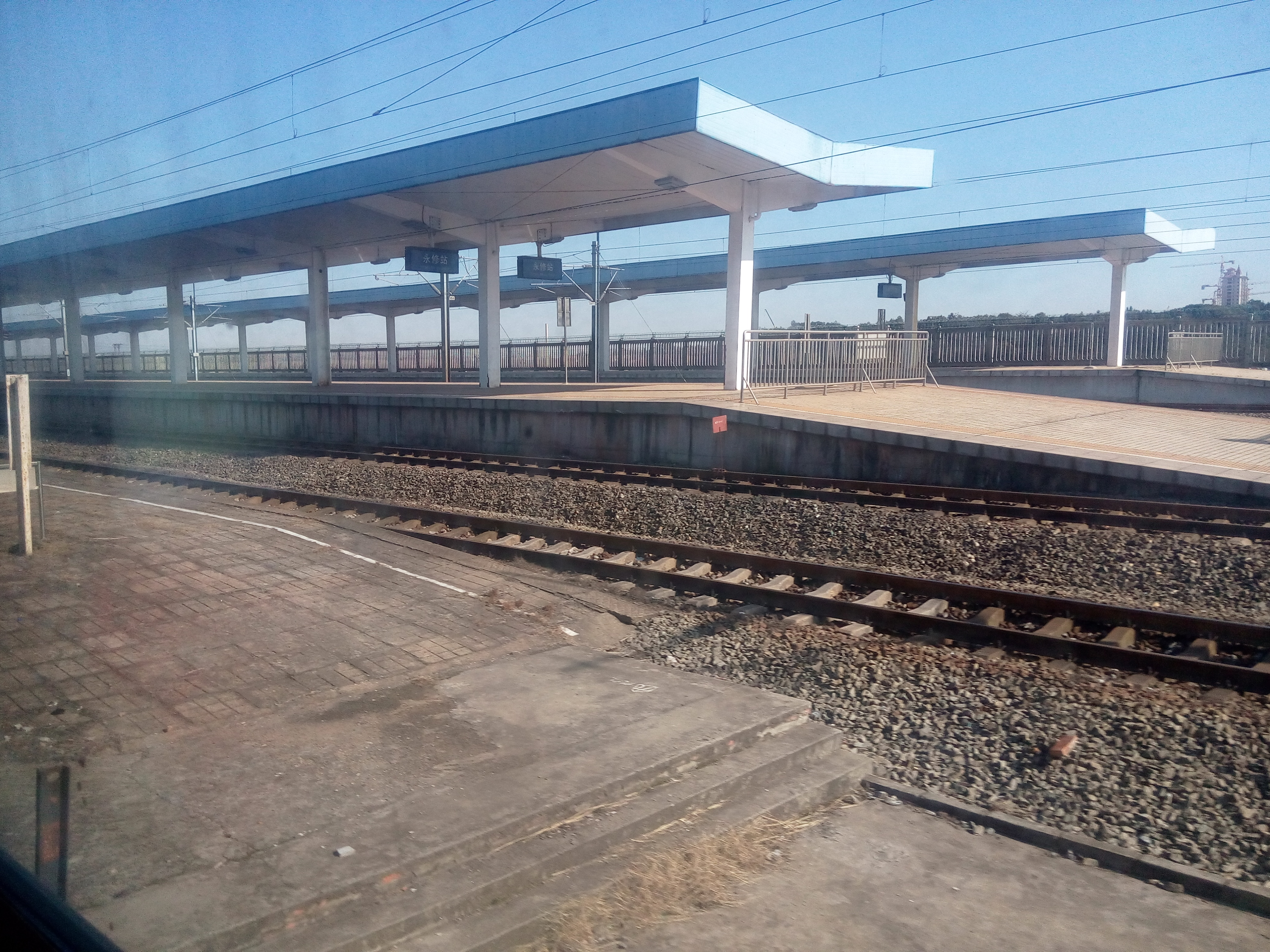
- Yongxiu Station platform

Services
Preceding station	China Railway	Following station
Gongqingcheng towards Beijing West	Beijing–Kowloon railway	Nanchang towards Hung Hom
Preceding station	China Railway High-speed	Following station
Nanchang West Terminus	Nanchang–Jiujiang intercity railway	Gongqingcheng towards Jiujiang
Location

Yongxiu railway station is a railway station located in Yongxiu County of Jiujiang, in Jiangxi province, eastern China.

It serves the Beijing–Kowloon railway and Nanchang–Jiujiang intercity railway.
