= De'an railway station =

Railway station in Jiujiang, Jiangxi, China

Coordinates: 29.3117°N 115.7617°E

De'an 德安
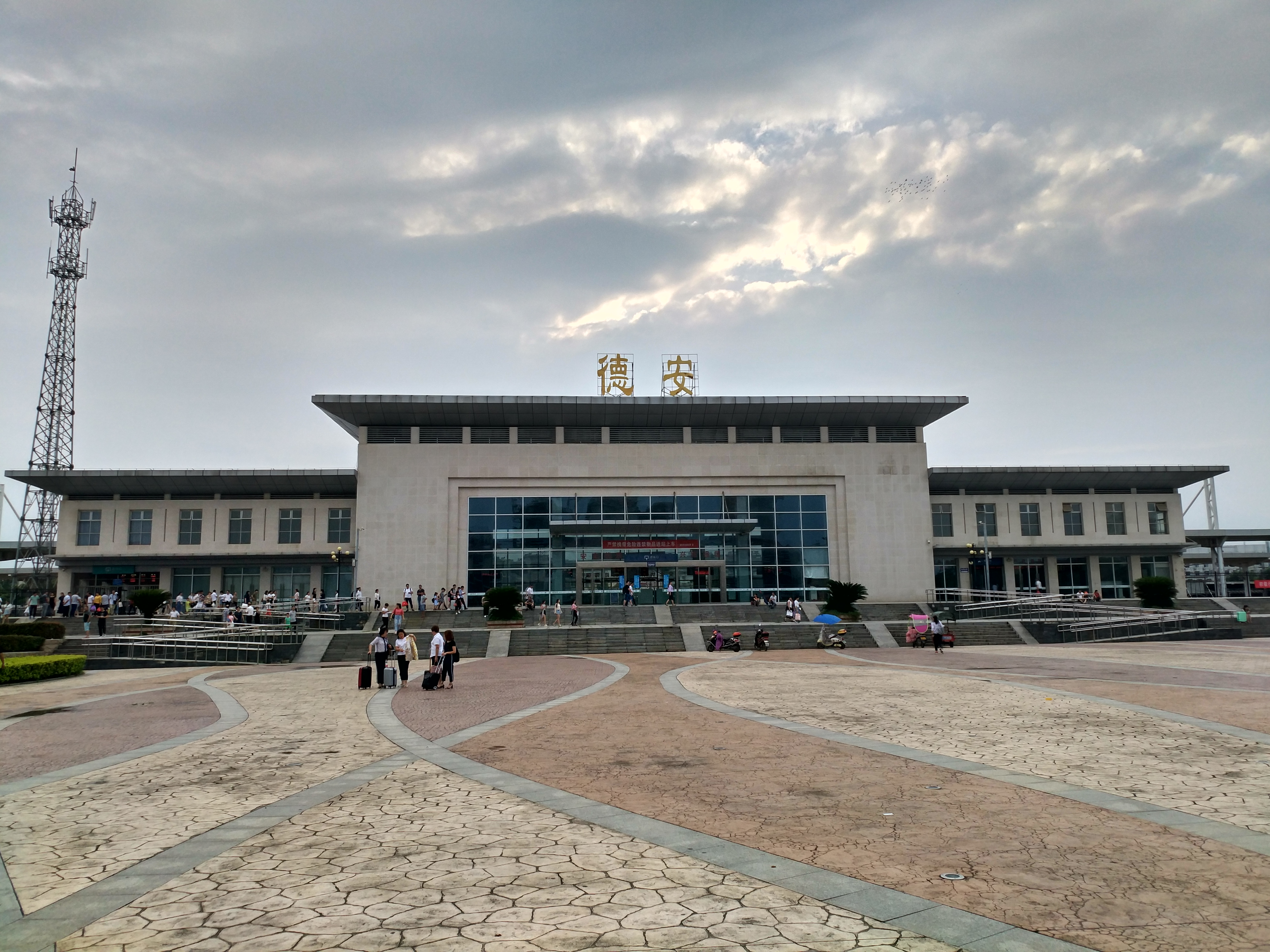

General information
- Location: De'an County, Jiujiang, Jiangxi province, East China
Location

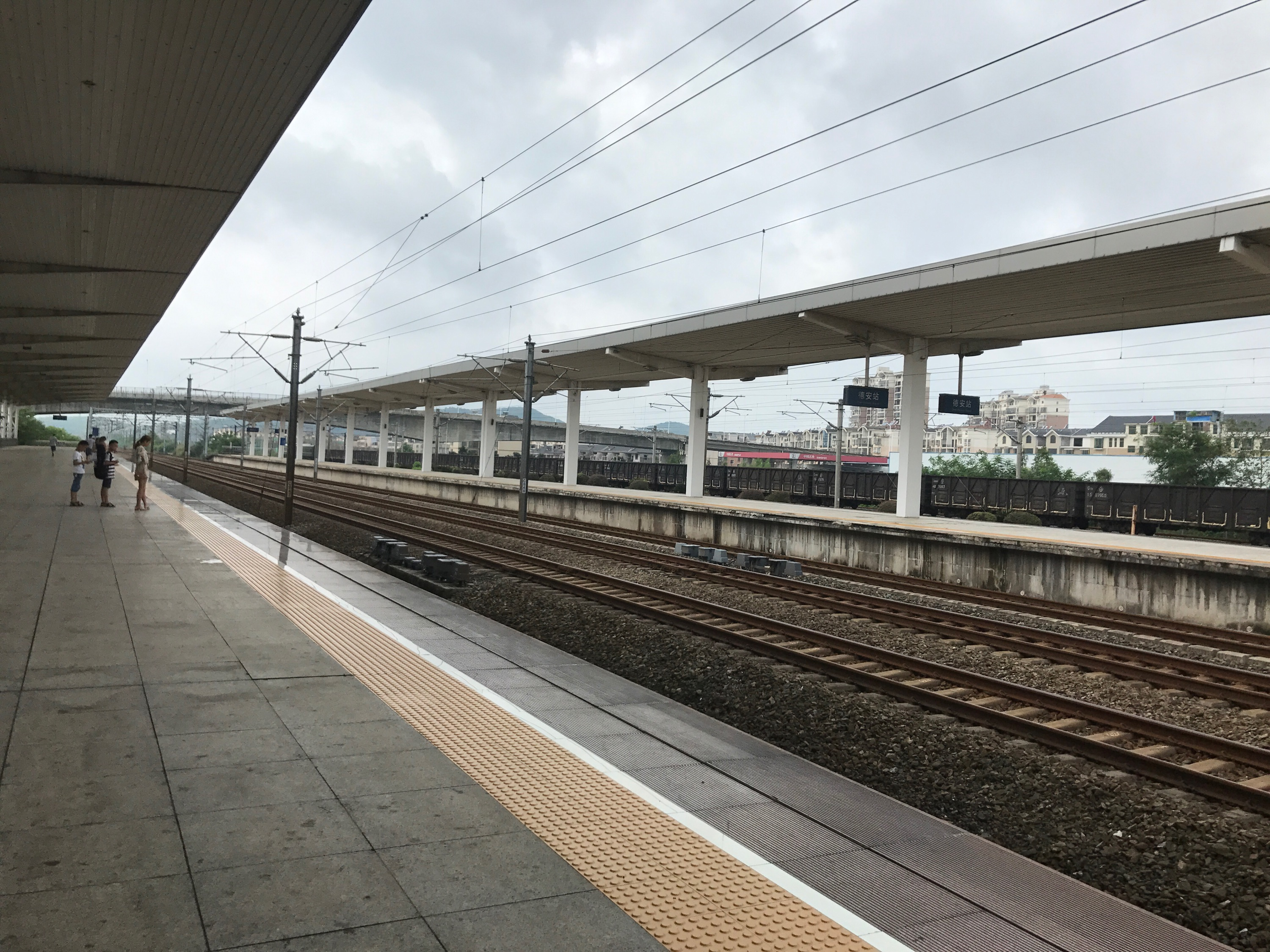
Looking south

De'an station (德安站) is a railway station located in De'an County of Jiujiang, in Jiangxi province, eastern China. It serves the Nanchang–Jiujiang intercity railway.

Preceding station	China Railway	Following station
Lushan towards Beijing West	Beijing–Kowloon railway	Gongqingcheng towards Hung Hom
Preceding station	China Railway High-speed	Following station
Gongqingcheng towards Nanchang West	Nanchang–Jiujiang intercity railway	Lushan towards Jiujiang
