= Yongxiu County =

Yongxiu County 永修县 Yungsiu
- County
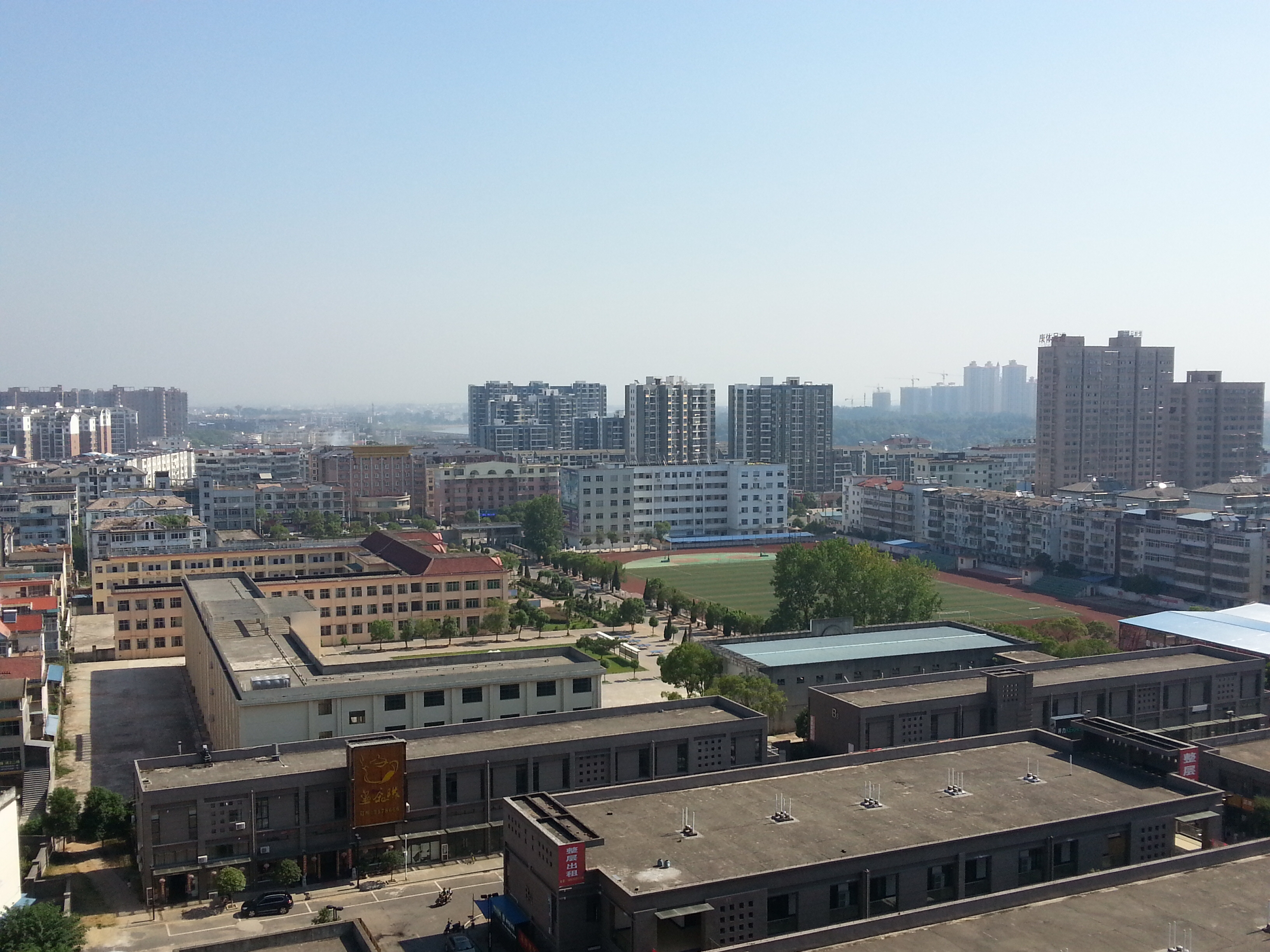

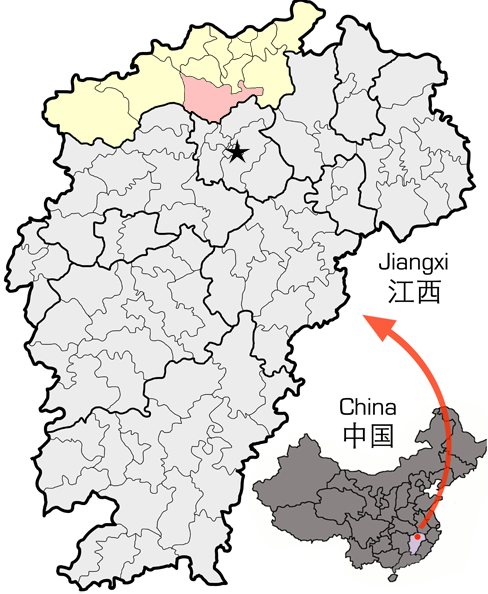
- Location of Yongxiu County in Jiujiang City (yellow) and Jiangxi
- Coordinates: 29°00′43″N 115°49′55″E
- Country: People's Republic of China
- Province: Jiangxi
- Prefecture-level city: Jiujiang
- County seat: Tubu (涂埠镇)

Area
  - Total: 1,947 km^{2} (752 sq mi)
- Elevation: 31 m (102 ft)

Population (2018)
  - Total: 399,400
  - Density: 205.1/km^{2} (531.3/sq mi)
- Time zone: UTC+8 (China Standard)
- Postal code: 330300
- Area code: 0792
- Website: yongxiu.gov.cn

Yongxiu (Chinese: 永修; pinyin: Yǒngxiū) is a county under the administration of Jiujiang City in northern Jiangxi province, People's Republic of China, on the western shores of Poyang Lake. As of 2005, the county has a total population of 361,000 residing in an area of 2,035 square kilometres (786 sq mi). Bordering counties are Duchang, Xingzi, De'an, Wuning, Jing'an, Xinjian, and Anyi, while the county seat is 40 kilometres (25 mi) north of Nanchang, the provincial capital, and 80 km (50 mi) south-southwest of downtown Jiujiang.

== Administrative divisions ==
Yongxiu County has 11 towns and 4 townships.

=== Towns (镇) ===
The county has 11 towns:

- Tubu (涂埠镇) — the county seat
- Wucheng (吴城镇)
- Sanxiqiao (三溪桥镇)
- Qiujin (虬津镇)
- Aicheng (艾城镇)
- Tanxi (滩溪镇)
- Baicha (白槎镇)
- Meitang (梅棠镇)
- Yanfang (燕坊镇)
- Makou (马口镇)
- Zhelin (柘林镇)

=== Townships (乡) ===
There are 4 townships:

- Sanjiao (三角乡)
- Jiuhe (九合乡)
- Lixin (立新乡)
- Jiangshang (江上乡)

== Transport ==
The Yongxiu County seat is 18 km (11 mi) north-northeast of Nanchang Changbei International Airport, and 50 km (31 mi) south of Jiujiang Lushan Airport.

The Beijing–Kowloon Railway and Nanchang–Jiujiang Intercity Railway traverse the county, and are served by the Yongxiu Railway Station.

Major highways passing through Yongxiu County are G70 Fuzhou–Yinchuan Expressway, China National Highway 105, and China National Highway 316.

Due to its importance in north–south travel in the province, Yongxiu was known as the "Gate of Hongdu" (洪都門戶) in ancient China.

== Tourism ==
The spectacular Zhelin Reservoir lies in the northwest part of the county. The sacred Buddhist heaven Yunju Mountain stands in the southwest. The famous Poyang Lake Nature Reserve in the eastern part of the county.

== Climate ==
Climate data for Yongxiu, elevation 37 m (121 ft), (1991–2020 normals, extremes 1981–present)
Month	Jan	Feb	Mar	Apr	May	Jun	Jul	Aug	Sep	Oct	Nov	Dec	Year
Record high °C (°F)	24.2 (75.6)	28.3 (82.9)	32.7 (90.9)	34.4 (93.9)	35.9 (96.6)	37.9 (100.2)	40.6 (105.1)	41.1 (106.0)	38.4 (101.1)	35.4 (95.7)	31.2 (88.2)	22.7 (72.9)	41.1 (106.0)
Mean daily maximum °C (°F)	9.1 (48.4)	11.9 (53.4)	16.1 (61.0)	22.4 (72.3)	27.1 (80.8)	29.7 (85.5)	33.4 (92.1)	32.9 (91.2)	29.1 (84.4)	24.2 (75.6)	18.1 (64.6)	11.8 (53.2)	22.1 (71.9)
Daily mean °C (°F)	5.4 (41.7)	7.9 (46.2)	11.9 (53.4)	17.9 (64.2)	22.8 (73.0)	25.8 (78.4)	29.2 (84.6)	28.6 (83.5)	24.8 (76.6)	19.5 (67.1)	13.5 (56.3)	7.6 (45.7)	17.9 (64.2)
Mean daily minimum °C (°F)	2.8 (37.0)	5.0 (41.0)	8.7 (47.7)	14.4 (57.9)	19.4 (66.9)	23.0 (73.4)	26.1 (79.0)	25.6 (78.1)	21.7 (71.1)	16.2 (61.2)	10.2 (50.4)	4.6 (40.3)	14.8 (58.7)
Record low °C (°F)	−4.3 (24.3)	−5.4 (22.3)	−1.7 (28.9)	2.0 (35.6)	9.7 (49.5)	13.9 (57.0)	18.7 (65.7)	18.8 (65.8)	13.9 (57.0)	4.1 (39.4)	−1.5 (29.3)	−8.7 (16.3)	−8.7 (16.3)
Average precipitation mm (inches)	77.8 (3.06)	96.5 (3.80)	167.0 (6.57)	224.6 (8.84)	215.9 (8.50)	293.5 (11.56)	172.6 (6.80)	123.0 (4.84)	69.5 (2.74)	50.0 (1.97)	74.0 (2.91)	53.9 (2.12)	1,618.3 (63.71)
Average precipitation days (≥ 0.1 mm)	12.8	12.6	16.8	16.1	15.1	16.1	11.5	10.8	7.1	7.1	9.0	9.4	144.4
Average snowy days	3.2	2.0	0.5	0	0	0	0	0	0	0	0.2	1.2	7.1
Average relative humidity (%)	77	77	79	78	78	83	78	79	77	73	75	74	77
Mean monthly sunshine hours	86.7	88.4	103.1	130.1	151.0	135.2	218.0	211.0	179.2	167.8	134.2	125.0	1,729.7
Percentage possible sunshine	27	28	28	34	36	32	51	52	49	48	42	39	39
Source: China Meteorological Administration
