= Ganlu =

Ganlu (甘露) may refer to:

- Sweet dew, often seen as an auspicious sign in Sinosphere.

== Towns in China ==
- Ganlu, Jiangxi, in Gongqingcheng, Jiangxi
- Ganlu, Sichuan, in Zizhong County, Sichuan

== Chinese era names ==
- Ganlu (53–50 BC), era name used by Emperor Xuan of Han
- Ganlu (256–260), era name used by Cao Mao, emperor of Cao Wei
- Ganlu (265–266), era name used by Sun Hao, emperor of Eastern Wu
- Ganlu (359–364), era name used by Fu Jian (337–385), emperor of Former Qin

== See also ==
- Sweet Dew incident, or Ganlu incident, an 835 palace coup in the Tang dynasty
- Amrita, which is translated into Chinese as Ganlu
