= Lushan railway station =

Railway station in Jiujiang, China

Coordinates: 29.5986°N 115.8764°E

Lushan 庐山
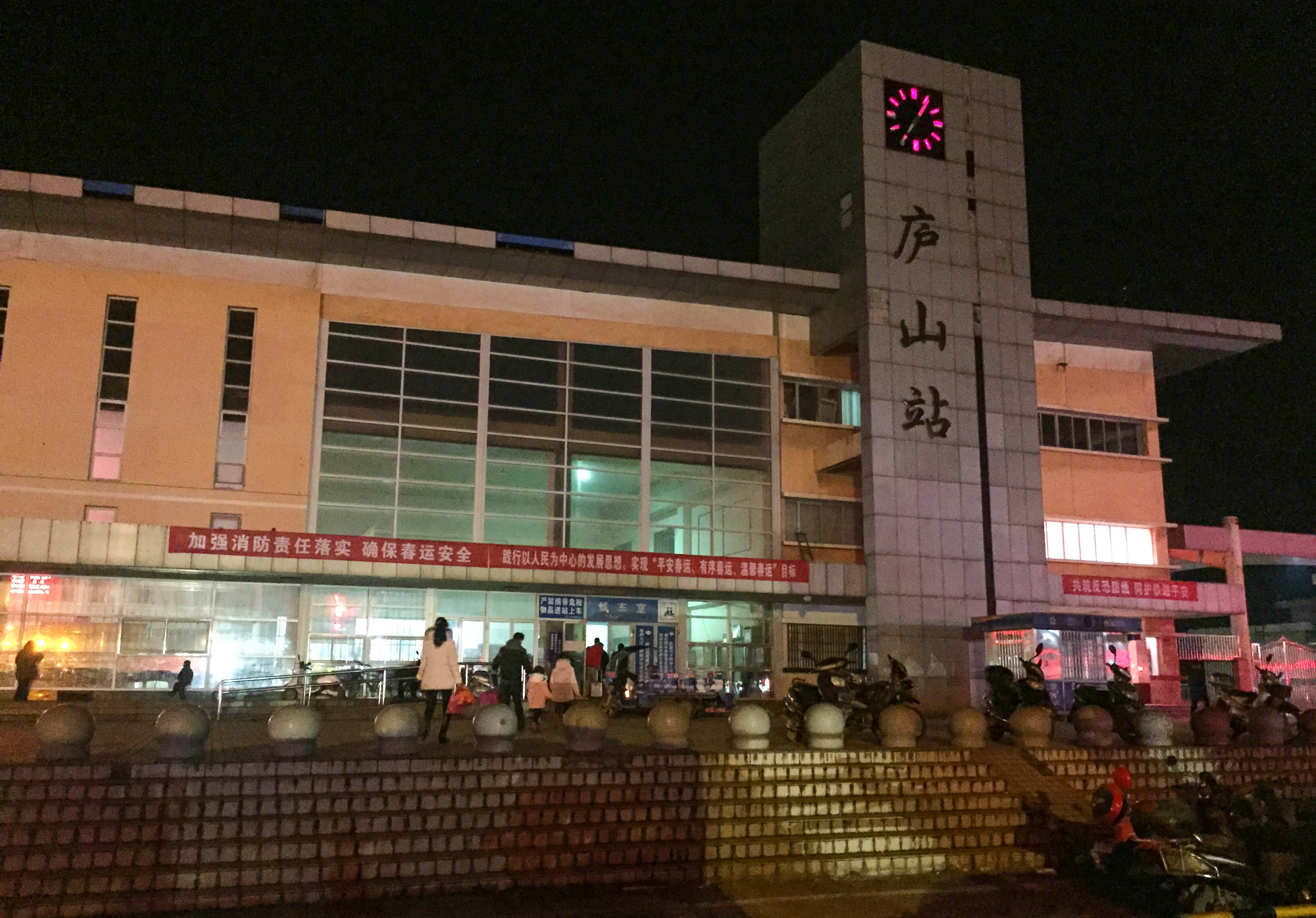
- Lushan railway station

General information
- Other names: Shahejie railway station
- Location: Chaisang District, Jiujiang, Jiangxi; China
- Operated by: Nanchang Railway Bureau, China Railway Corporation
- Lines: Beijing–Kowloon railway; Nanchang–Jiujiang intercity railway; Hefei–Jiujiang high-speed railway; Nanchang–Jiujiang high-speed railway (under construction); Jiaozuo–Liuzhou railway

Other information
- Station code: 25326

History
- Opened: 1910
Location

Lushan railway station is a railway station located in the Chaisang District of Jiujiang, in Jiangxi province, eastern China.

It serves the Beijing–Kowloon railway and Nanchang–Jiujiang intercity railway. It is the southern terminus of the Hefei–Jiujiang high-speed railway.

== History ==
Work on a west-facing station began in September 2020. The new building was opened on 28 April 2022.

Preceding station	China Railway	Following station
Jiujiang towards Beijing West	Beijing–Kowloon railway	De'an towards Hung Hom
Xinjizhai towards Jiaozuo	Jiaozuo–Liuzhou railway	Ranghe towards Liuzhou
Preceding station	China Railway High-speed	Following station
De'an towards Nanchang West	Nanchang–Jiujiang intercity railway	Jiujiang Terminus
