= Xiaochikou railway station =

Railway station in Huanggang, Hubei

Xiaochikou 小池口

General information
- Location: Huangmei County, Huanggang, Hubei; China
- Coordinates: 29°48′44.18″N 116°0′31.6″E
- Lines: Beijing–Kowloon railway; Hefei–Jiujiang railway

History
- Opened: 1996
Location

Xiaochikou railway station (Chinese: 小池口站) is a railway station in Huangmei County, Huanggang, Hubei, China. It is currently served by one train, the 6026 from Jiujiang to Machang. It is reportedly the least-used station under Nanchang Railway Bureau.

Preceding station	China Railway	Following station
Huangmei towards Beijing West	Beijing–Kowloon railway	Jiujiang towards Hung Hom
Huangmei towards Hefei	Hefei–Jiujiang railway	Jiujiang Terminus
