= Nanchang South railway station =

Railway station in Nanchang, China

Coordinates: 26.8078°N 113.4441°E

Nanchang South 南昌南站
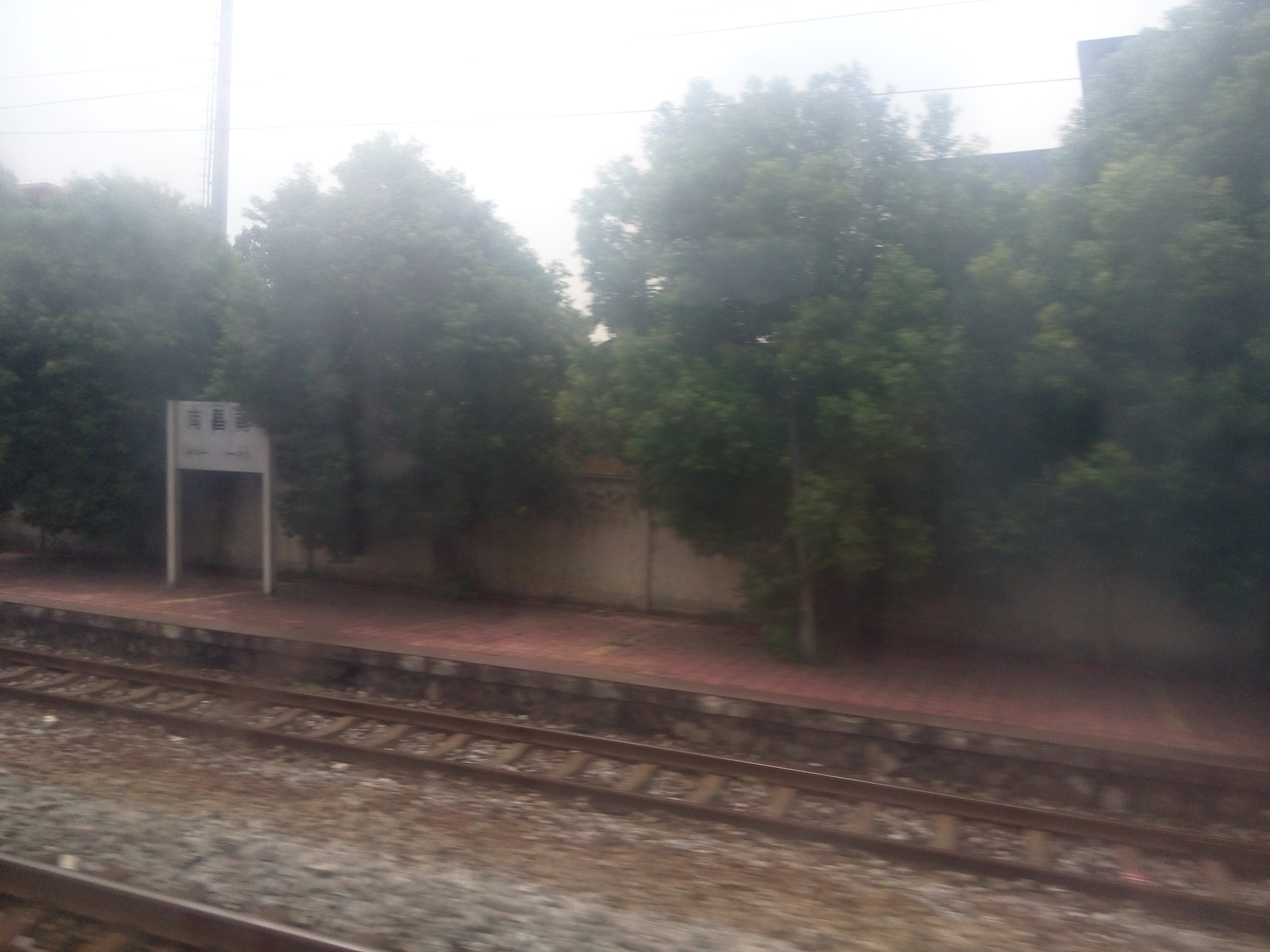
- Nanchang South (Nanchangnan) Railway Station

General information
- Location: Qingyunpu District, Nanchang, Jiangxi; China
- Operator: Nanchang Railway Bureau, China Railway Corporation
- Lines: Beijing–Kowloon railway, Nanchang Steel Plant Branch Line
- Platforms: 2

History
- Opened: 1958
Location

Nanchang South railway station, located in the Qingyunpu District, Nanchang, Jiangxi, China, is a station on the Beijing–Kowloon railway and terminus station on the Nanchang Steel Plant Branch Line.

== History ==
The station opened in 1958, originally as both a passenger and freight station, but as the speed of trains increased, passenger services were abandoned. The station now sees only freight services. The station is named Qingyunpu railway station between 1962 and 2008. It renamed to Nanchang South railway station in 2008.

== Public transportation ==
There are four bus services, bus services No. 15, 16, 203 and 236.

== Platforms ==
The station has two platforms: one island platform and one bay platform.

Preceding station	China Railway	Following station
Nanchang towards Beijing West	Beijing–Kowloon railway	Liantang towards Hung Hom
