= Hefei–Jiujiang railway =

Railway line between Hefei and Jiujiang

Overview
- Status: Operational
- Termini: Hefei; Jiujiang
- Stations: 11

Service
- Type: Heavy rail

History
- Opened: 31 May 1995

Technical
- Track gauge: 1,435 mm (4 ft 8 1/2 in) standard gauge
- Electrification: None

The Hefei–Jiujiang railway is a passenger and freight railway in China.

Between Jiujiang and Konglong, the line is double-track. The remainder is single-track. This double-track portion is shared with the Beijing–Kowloon railway. The Hefei–Anqing–Jiujiang high-speed railway takes a similar route to this railway.

== History ==
The line opened on May 31, 1995.

== Stations ==
The line has the following passenger stations:

- Jiujiang
- Xiaochikou (interchange with the Beijing–Kowloon railway)
- Konglong (interchange with the Beijing–Kowloon railway)
- Huangmei
- Susong
- Taihu
- Tianzhushan
- Anqing West
- Tongcheng
- Lujiang
- Shucheng
- Hefei
