= Nanchang East railway station =

Railway station in Nanchang, China

Nanchang East 南昌东
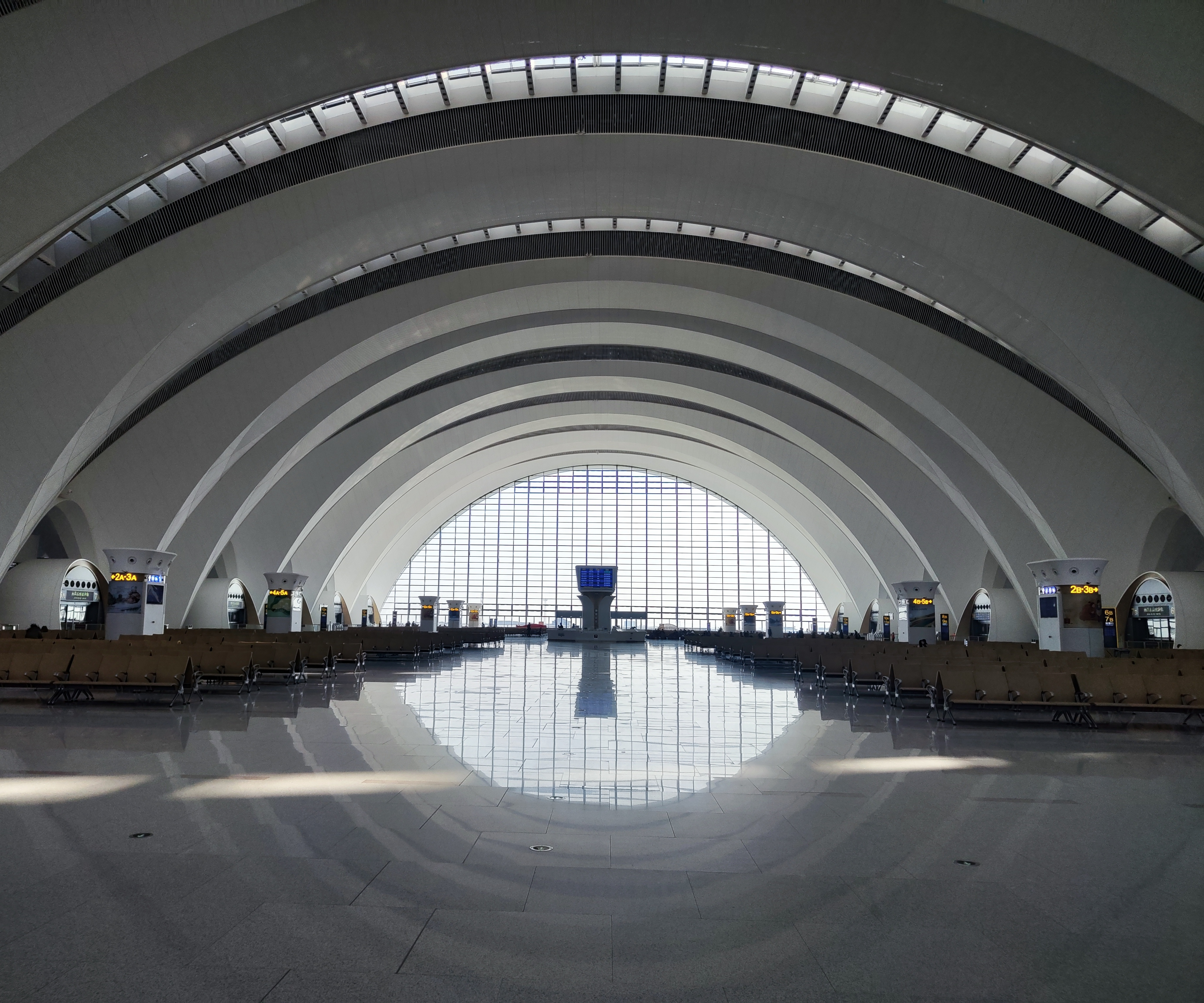

General information
- Location: Qingshanhu District, Nanchang, Jiangxi; China
- System: High-speed rail
- Lines: Nanchang–Jingdezhen–Huangshan high-speed railway Nanchang–Jiujiang high-speed railway Nanchang–Ganzhou high-speed railway
Location

Nanchang East railway station is a railway station in Qingshanhu District, Nanchang, Jiangxi, China. Opened in 27 December 2023, it is served by the Nanchang–Jingdezhen–Huangshan high-speed railway, Nanchang–Jiujiang high-speed railway (currently under construction), and the Nanchang–Ganzhou high-speed railway.

== Design ==
The station will have an arched structure.

== Nanchang Metro ==
Nanchang East railway station will be served by Lines 2 (extension under construction) and 5 (under planning) of Nanchang Metro. Provision is also being provided for an additional north–south line.

== See also ==
- Nanchang railway station
- Nanchang West railway station
