= Lehua East railway station =

Railway station in Jiangxi, China

Coordinates: 28.8176°N 115.8660°E

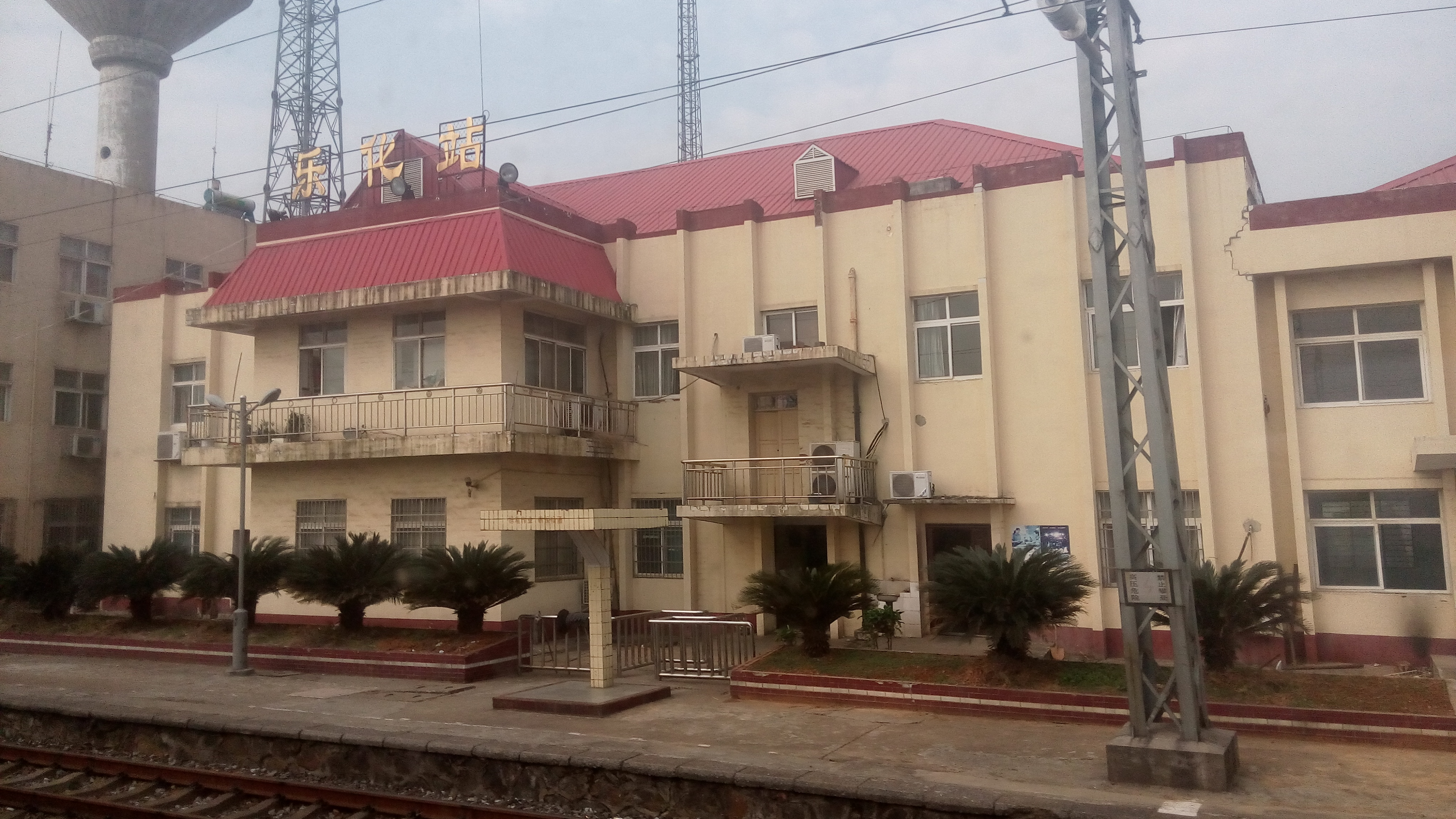

General information
- Line: Changjiu Intercity Railway
Location

Lehua East railway station is a railway station of Changjiu Intercity Railway located in Jiangxi, People's Republic of China.
