= Qiujin =

Qiujin 虬津镇
- Town
- Location in Jiangxi Qiujin (China)
- Coordinates: 29°10′13″N 115°40′52″E
- Country: People's Republic of China
- Province: Jiangxi
- Prefecture-level city: Jiujiang
- County: Yongxiu County
- Time zone: UTC+8 (China Standard)

Qiujin (Chinese: 虬津; pinyin: Qiújīn) is a town under the administration of Yongxiu County, Jiangxi, China. As of 2023, it administers the following three residential communities and eight villages:

- Qiujin Community
- Qingshawan Community (青沙湾社区)
- Hushan Community (虎山社区)
- Hongqiao Village (红桥村)
- Mazhou Village (麻洲村)
- Matan Village (麻潭村)
- Guihu Village (规湖村)
- Poban Village (鄱坂村)
- Zhanggongdu Village (张公渡村)
- Heling Village (何岭村)
- Baotian Village (宝田村)
