= China National Highway 105 =

Road in China

National Highway 105
- 105国道

Route information
- Length: 2,717 km (1,688 mi)

Major junctions
- From: Beijing
- To: Macau

Location
- Country: China

Highway system
- National Trunk Highway System; Primary; Auxiliary
← G104	→ G106

China National Highway 105 (G105) runs from Beijing to Macau SAR, via Langfang, Chuangzhou, Dezhou, Donge, Jining, Shuangyou, Fuyang, Liuan, Jiujiang, Nanchang, Ji'an, Guangzhou and Zhuhai. It runs to approximately 2,717 km, and, on a map, runs broadly on a straight line from Beijing to Guangzhou.

Through the Lotus Bridge it is connected to Macau, this section has been selected to extend the G105 in 2013, under a new 2013-2030 plan by NDRC and MoT.

== Route and distance ==
Route and distance

City	Distance (km)
Beijing, Beijing	0
Langfang, Hebei	60
Xiqing District, Tianjin	102
Jinghai, Tianjin	115
Qing County, Hebei	120
Cangzhou, Hebei	224
Botou, Hebei	328
Dongguang, Hebei	330
Wuqiao, Hebei	433
Dezhou, Shandong	436
Gaotang, Shandong	542
Dong'e, Shandong	648
Pingyin, Shandong	651
Dongping, Shandong	755
Wenshang, Shandong	758
Jining, Shandong	862
Jinxiang, Shandong	866
Shan County, Shandong	970
Shangqiu, Henan	976
Suiyang District, Henan	1077
Bozhou, Anhui	1193
Taihe County, Anhui	1271
Fuyang, Anhui	1305
Liu'an, Anhui	1314
Huoshan, Anhui	1419
Yuexi County, Anhui	
Susong, Anhui	1443
Huangmei County, Hubei	1545
Jiujiang, Jiangxi	1541
Lushan District, Jiangxi	1654
De'an, Jiangxi	1658
Nanchang, Jiangxi	1659
Fengcheng, Jiangxi	1575
Zhangshu, Jiangxi	1578
Xingan County, Jiangxi	1582
Xiajiang, Jiangxi	1684
Jishui, Jiangxi	1688
Ji'an, Jiangxi	1791
Taihe County, Jiangxi	1795
Suichuan, Jiangxi	1803
Ganzhou, Jiangxi	1803
Xinfeng County, Jiangxi	1919
Lianping, Guangdong	1935
Xinfeng County, Guangdong	2140
Guangzhou, Guangdong	2358
Shunde, Guangdong	2563
Zhongshan, Guangdong	2671
Zhuhai, Guangdong	2717

== See also ==
- China National Highways
