= Heping County =

Heping 和平县
- County
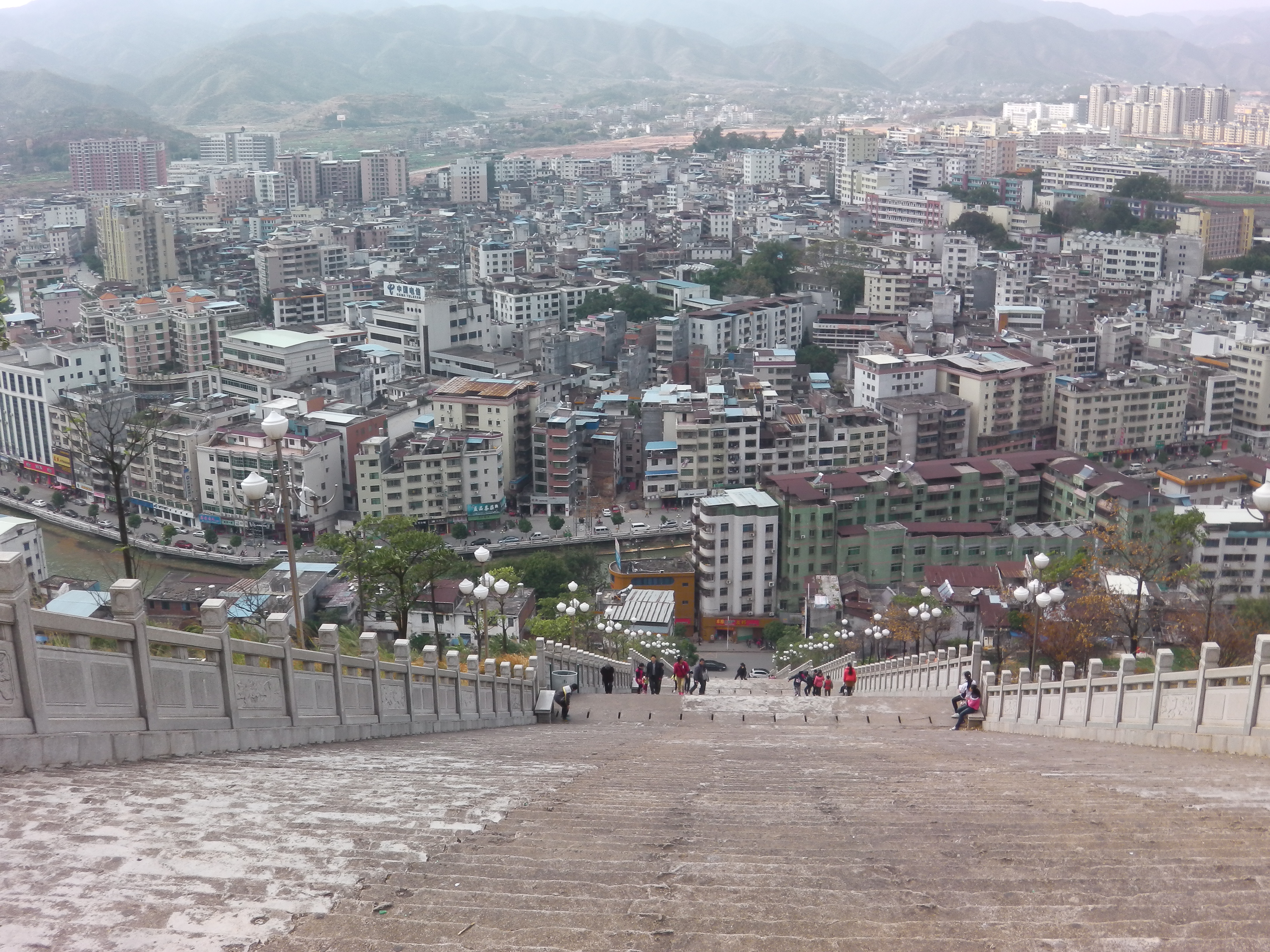

- Location in Guangdong
- Coordinates: 24°26′N 115°00′E
- Country: People's Republic of China
- Province: Guangdong
- Prefecture-level city: Heyuan

Area
  - Total: 2,311 km^{2} (892 sq mi)

Population (2020)
  - Total: 353,903
  - Density: 153.1/km^{2} (396.6/sq mi)
- Time zone: UTC+8 (China Standard)

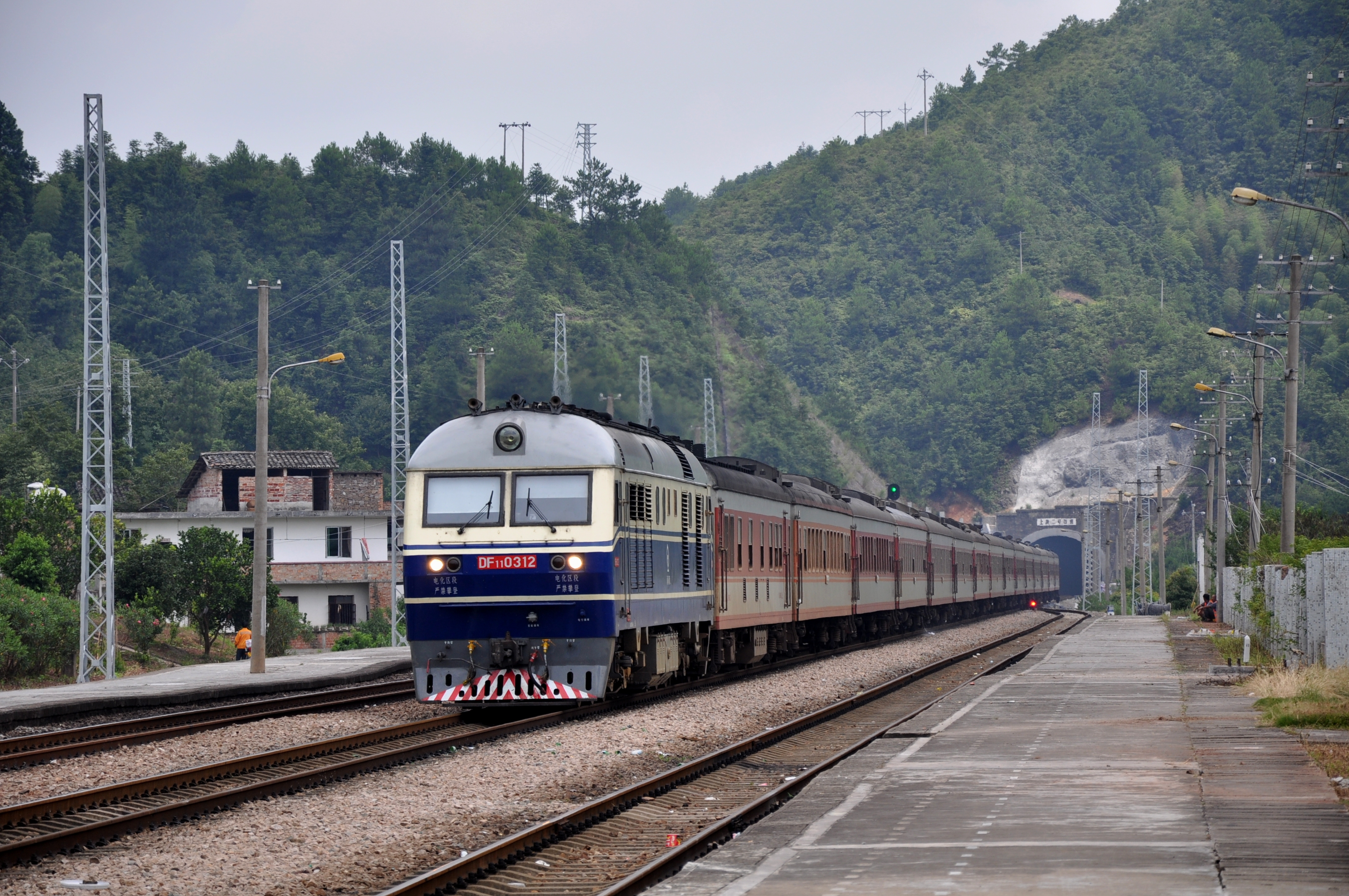
Beijing–Kowloon Railway at the Shangling Station (Chinese: 上陵站) in Heping County, Guangdong.

Heping (Chinese: 和平; Jyutping: wo4 ping4, Hakka: Fò-phìn) is a county of northeastern Guangdong Province, China, bordering Jiangxi to the north. It is under the administration of Heyuan City. At the 2020 census, its population was around 353,903, with the majority of the residents being Hakka.

== Language ==
As in the great majority of Heyuan county, Hakka Chinese is spoken, with residents calling their local dialect Heping hua.

== Climate ==
Climate data for Heping, elevation 208 m (682 ft), (1991–2020 normals, extremes 1981–2010)
Month	Jan	Feb	Mar	Apr	May	Jun	Jul	Aug	Sep	Oct	Nov	Dec	Year
Record high °C (°F)	27.9 (82.2)	30.6 (87.1)	32.0 (89.6)	33.5 (92.3)	36.0 (96.8)	37.9 (100.2)	38.1 (100.6)	39.2 (102.6)	37.4 (99.3)	35.8 (96.4)	34.5 (94.1)	28.7 (83.7)	39.2 (102.6)
Mean daily maximum °C (°F)	16.2 (61.2)	18.1 (64.6)	20.7 (69.3)	25.3 (77.5)	28.9 (84.0)	31.1 (88.0)	33.3 (91.9)	33.1 (91.6)	31.2 (88.2)	27.7 (81.9)	23.3 (73.9)	18.0 (64.4)	25.6 (78.0)
Daily mean °C (°F)	10.5 (50.9)	12.7 (54.9)	15.8 (60.4)	20.6 (69.1)	24.1 (75.4)	26.5 (79.7)	27.8 (82.0)	27.4 (81.3)	25.6 (78.1)	21.8 (71.2)	17.1 (62.8)	12.0 (53.6)	20.2 (68.3)
Mean daily minimum °C (°F)	6.9 (44.4)	9.2 (48.6)	12.5 (54.5)	17.2 (63.0)	20.9 (69.6)	23.5 (74.3)	24.1 (75.4)	23.8 (74.8)	22.0 (71.6)	17.8 (64.0)	13.0 (55.4)	8.1 (46.6)	16.6 (61.9)
Record low °C (°F)	−2.6 (27.3)	−1.1 (30.0)	−1.5 (29.3)	6.0 (42.8)	10.3 (50.5)	15.3 (59.5)	18.3 (64.9)	19.3 (66.7)	13.5 (56.3)	6.3 (43.3)	−0.4 (31.3)	−3.5 (25.7)	−3.5 (25.7)
Average precipitation mm (inches)	60.9 (2.40)	81.4 (3.20)	164.4 (6.47)	205.1 (8.07)	230.8 (9.09)	279.7 (11.01)	173.9 (6.85)	182.8 (7.20)	127.8 (5.03)	37.8 (1.49)	49.7 (1.96)	47.7 (1.88)	1,642 (64.65)
Average precipitation days (≥ 0.1 mm)	8.3	11.1	17.3	17.2	18.3	19.1	15.5	16.9	11.5	5.2	6.3	6.8	153.5
Average snowy days	0.1	0.1	0	0	0	0	0	0	0	0	0	0.1	0.3
Average relative humidity (%)	75	78	82	83	84	85	82	82	80	74	74	72	79
Mean monthly sunshine hours	110.6	88.6	77.0	85.0	105.7	128.1	195.5	174.8	168.2	175.1	153.9	140.7	1,603.2
Percentage possible sunshine	33	28	21	22	26	31	47	44	46	49	47	43	36
Source: China Meteorological Administration
