= Hefei–Anqing–Jiujiang high-speed railway =

Chinese high-speed railway

Hefei–Anqing–Jiujiang high-speed railway 合安九高铁
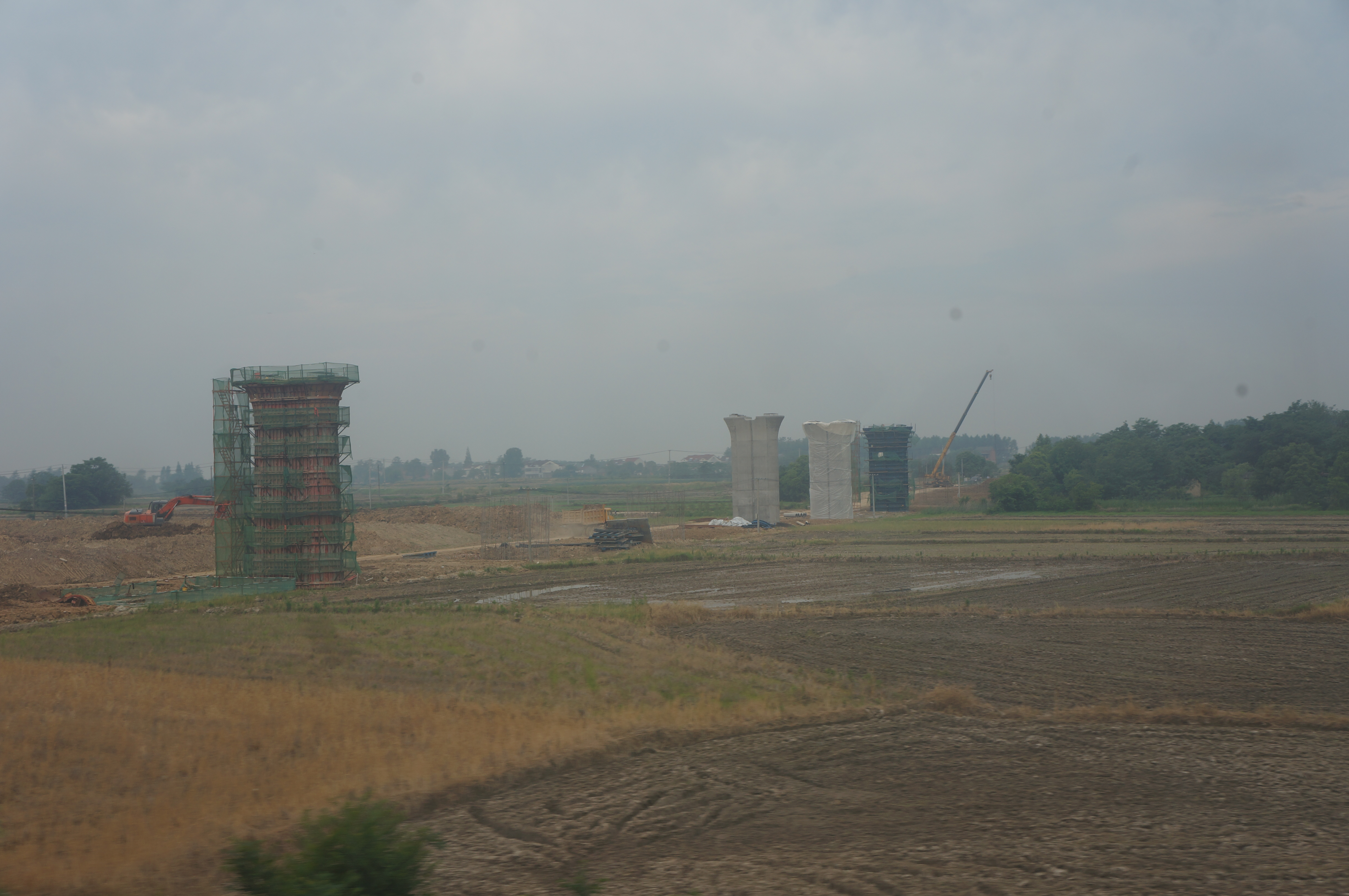

Overview
- Locale: Anhui, Hubei and Jiangxi, China
- Termini: Hefei South; Lushan

Service
- Type: High-speed rail
- Operator(s): China Railway High-speed

Technical
- Line length: 340 km (211 mi)
- Track gauge: 1,435 mm (4 ft 8 1/2 in) standard gauge
- Operating speed: 350 km/h (217 mph)

The Hefei–Anqing–Jiujiang high-speed railway (Chinese: 合安九高铁) is a 340-kilometre (211 mi) long high-speed rail line in China, with a maximum speed of 350 km/h (220 mph). It forms part of the Beijing–Hong Kong (Taipei) corridor. The line takes a similar route to the existing Hefei–Jiujiang railway.

The 162 kilometres (101 mi) long section from Hefei to Anqing, opened on 22 December 2020. The remaining section from Anqing to Lushan railway station in Jiujiang opened on 30 December 2021.

== History ==
Construction on the Bianyuzhou Yangtze River Bridge, which carries the railway across the Yangtze, began in 2018. It was opened to traffic on December 30, 2021
