= Nanchang–Jiujiang high-speed railway =

High-speed rail line in China

Nanchang–Jiujiang high-speed railway 昌九高速铁路

Overview
- Status: Under construction
- Termini: Nanchang East; Lushan
- Stations: 5

Service
- Operator(s): China Railway Nanchang Group

Technical
- Line length: 134.4 km (83.5 mi)
- Track gauge: 1,435 mm (4 ft 8 1/2 in)
- Operating speed: 350 km/h (217 mph)

The Nanchang–Jiujiang high-speed railway is a high-speed railway currently under construction in Jiangxi Province, China. The railway will have a design speed of 350 kilometres per hour (220 mph). It is part of the Beijing–Hong Kong (Taipei) corridor.

The line runs roughly parallel to the Nanchang–Jiujiang intercity railway, but on a faster 350-kilometre-per-hour (220 mph) alignment.

== History ==
A feasibility study for the line was approved in February 2021. Construction started on 21 November 2022. It is expected to be completed by 2027.

== Stations ==
Station Name	Chinese	Metro transfers/connections
Nanchang East	南昌东	
Changbei Airport	昌北机场	
Gongqingcheng East	共青城东	
Lushan South	庐山南	
Lushan	庐山	
