= Ganlu, Sichuan =

Ganlu 甘露镇
- Town
- Location in Sichuan
- Coordinates: 29°52′46″N 104°45′49″E
- Country: People's Republic of China
- Province: Sichuan
- Prefecture-level city: Neijiang
- County: Zizhong County
- Time zone: UTC+8 (China Standard)

Ganlu (Chinese: 甘露镇) is a town in Zizhong County, in eastern Sichuan province, China. As of 2018, it has one residential community and 17 villages under its administration.
