= Nanchang railway station =

Railway station in Nanchang, China

Nanchang 南昌
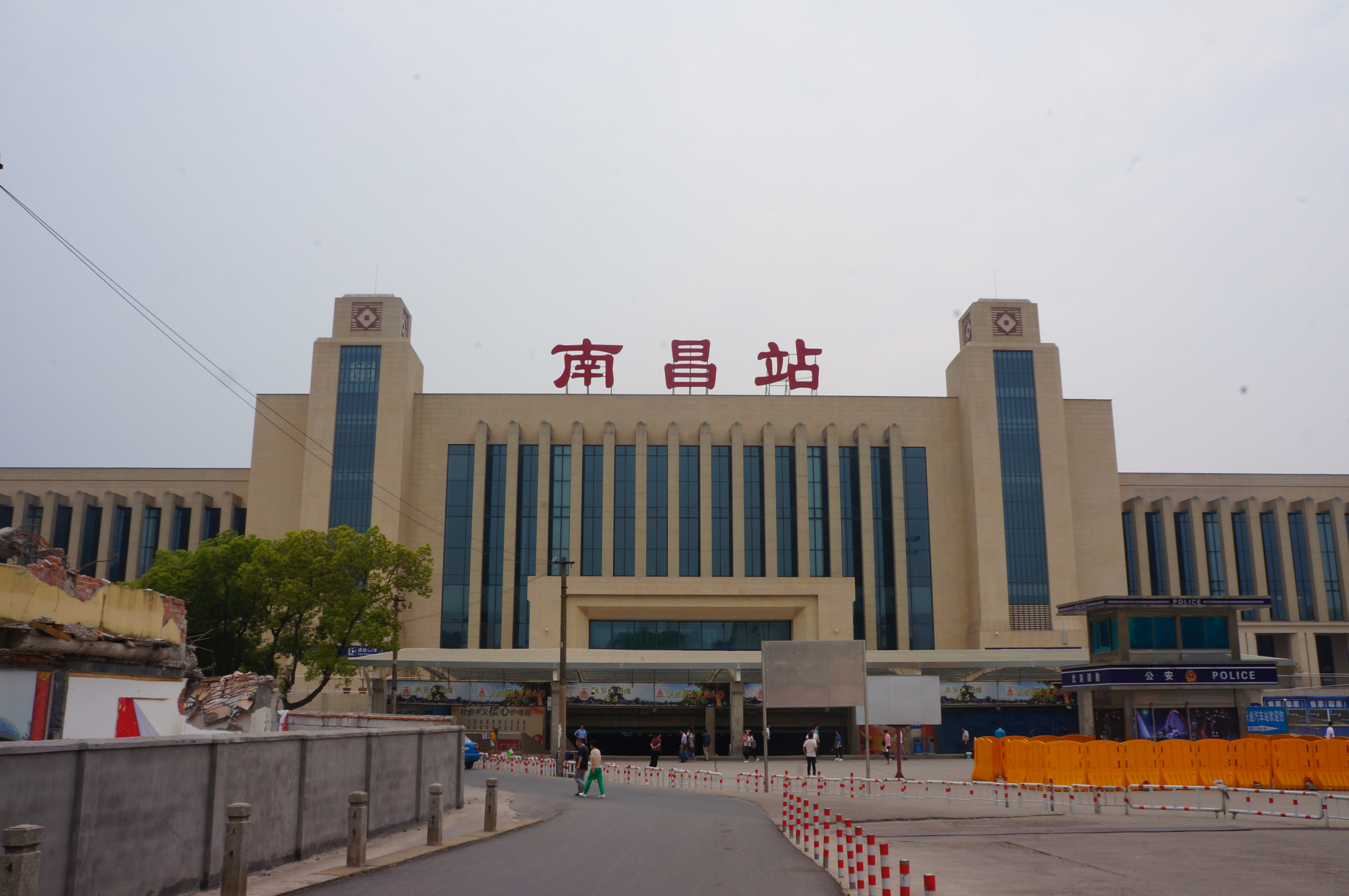
- Nanchang railway station

General information
- Location: Nanzhan Lu, Xihu District, Nanchang, Jiangxi; China
- Coordinates: 28°39′55.5″N 115°54′49″E
- Operated by: Nanchang Railway Bureau, China Railway Corporation
- Line(s): Jingjiu railway, Changjiu Intercity Railway
- Platforms: 4
- Connections: Bus terminal

History
- Opened: 1935

Nanchang railway station (Chinese: 南昌站; pinyin: Nánchāng zhàn) is a railway station located in the city of Nanchang, in Jiangxi province, eastern China.

It serves the Changjiu Intercity Railway, Nanchang–Jiujiang Intercity Railway, and Jingjiu railway.

The station opened in 1935.

== Adjacent Stations ==
- Next (west/north): Nanchang Railway Station Second Spot (Nanchang West)
- Next (south): Qingyunpu railway station (Nanchang South)

== See also ==
- Nanchang Rail Transit

Preceding station	China Railway	Following station
Yongxiu towards Beijing West	Beijing–Kowloon railway	Xiangtang towards Hung Hom
