= Ganlu, Jiangxi =

Ganlu 甘露镇
- Town
- Location in Jiangxi Ganlu (China)
- Coordinates: 29.2562°N 115.7687°E
- Country: People's Republic of China
- Province: Jiangxi
- Prefecture-level city: Jiujiang
- Sub-prefectural city: Gongqingcheng
- Time zone: UTC+8 (China Standard)

Ganlu (Chinese: 甘露镇) is a town in Gongqingcheng, in northern Jiangxi province, China. As of 2018, it has one residential community, 6 villages and 2 forest areas under its administration.
