= Chaisang, Jiujiang =

Chaisang 柴桑区
- District
- Interactive map of Chaisang
- Coordinates: 29°36′29″N 115°54′40″E
- Country: People's Republic of China
- Province: Jiangxi
- Prefecture-level city: Jiujiang

Area
  - Total: 873.33 km^{2} (337.19 sq mi)

Population (2018)
  - Total: 335,600
  - Density: 384.3/km^{2} (995.3/sq mi)
- Time zone: UTC+8 (China Standard)
- Postal code: 332100

Chaisang District (simplified Chinese: 柴桑区; traditional Chinese: 柴桑區; pinyin: Cháisāng Qū), known as Jiujiang County (九江县; 九江縣; Jiǔjiāng Xiàn) before September 2017, is a district of the city of Jiujiang in Jiangxi Province, China. It has non-contiguous land area, with a smaller exclave to the northeast being separated by Lianxi District and Xunyang District.

== History ==
During the Three Kingdoms era, Chaisang was a stronghold in the Eastern Wu state.

== Administrative divisions ==
Chaisang District is divided to 3 subdistricts, 5 towns and 4 townships.

3 subdistricts

- Shahe (沙河街道)
- Shizi (狮子街道)
- Chengmen (城门街道)

5 towns

- Mahuiling (马回岭镇)
- Jiangzhou (江洲镇)
- Chengzi (城子镇)
- Ganggangjie (港口街镇)
- Xinhe (新合镇)

4 townships

- Yong'an (永安乡)
- Yongquan (涌泉乡)
- Xintang (新塘乡)
- Minshan (岷山乡)

== Climate ==
Climate data for Chaisang District, elevation 63 m (207 ft), (1991–2020 normals)
Month	Jan	Feb	Mar	Apr	May	Jun	Jul	Aug	Sep	Oct	Nov	Dec	Year
Mean daily maximum °C (°F)	8.5 (47.3)	10.9 (51.6)	16.9 (62.4)	23.1 (73.6)	27.3 (81.1)	29.7 (85.5)	33.1 (91.6)	33.4 (92.1)	28.8 (83.8)	23.3 (73.9)	17.4 (63.3)	10.6 (51.1)	21.9 (71.4)
Daily mean °C (°F)	4.9 (40.8)	6.8 (44.2)	12.2 (54.0)	18.0 (64.4)	22.6 (72.7)	25.7 (78.3)	29.0 (84.2)	28.9 (84.0)	24.3 (75.7)	18.9 (66.0)	13.1 (55.6)	6.6 (43.9)	17.6 (63.7)
Mean daily minimum °C (°F)	2.4 (36.3)	3.9 (39.0)	8.6 (47.5)	14.0 (57.2)	18.9 (66.0)	22.6 (72.7)	25.8 (78.4)	25.6 (78.1)	21.1 (70.0)	15.7 (60.3)	10.0 (50.0)	3.7 (38.7)	14.4 (57.9)
Average precipitation mm (inches)	73.5 (2.89)	109.2 (4.30)	161.6 (6.36)	143.6 (5.65)	214.1 (8.43)	221.1 (8.70)	186.1 (7.33)	104.9 (4.13)	115.2 (4.54)	75.1 (2.96)	77.9 (3.07)	64.4 (2.54)	1,546.7 (60.9)
Average precipitation days (≥ 0.1 mm)	13.4	13.5	16.0	14.0	14.2	16.8	11.5	10.1	9.3	10.3	12.5	9.6	151.2
Average snowy days	2.6	2.1	0.2	0	0	0	0	0	0	0	0.2	1.3	6.4
Average relative humidity (%)	77	78	76	74	76	82	77	76	77	75	79	73	77
Mean monthly sunshine hours	73.8	79.7	113.4	132.4	129.7	110.5	180.6	184.2	139.3	134.8	100.5	98.1	1,477
Percentage possible sunshine	23	25	31	34	31	26	42	46	38	39	32	31	33
Source: China Meteorological Administration
