= Jiujiang railway station =

Railway station in Jiujiang, China

Coordinates: 29°42′16″N 116°00′24″E

Jiujiang 九江
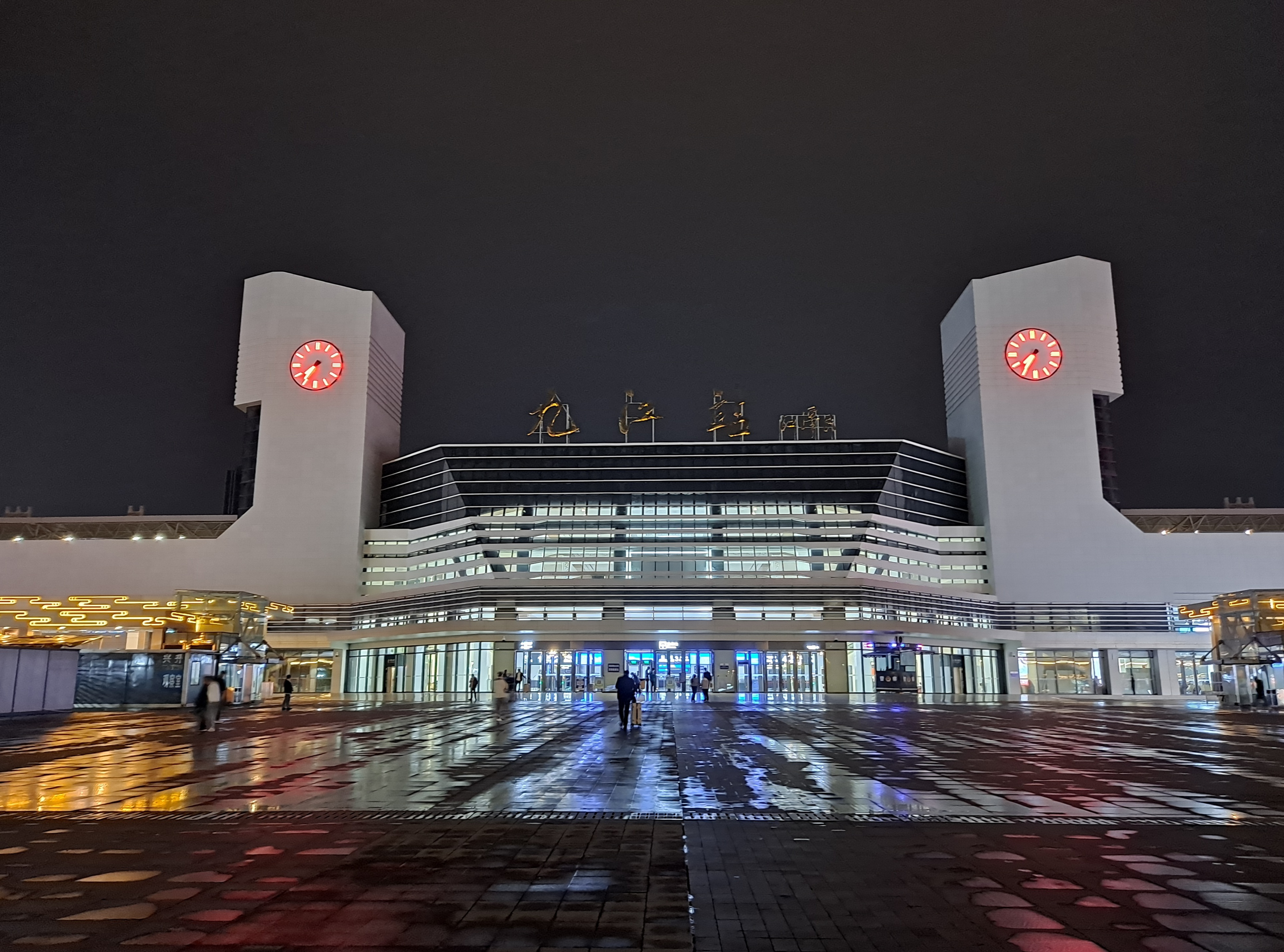
- Jiujiang railway station

General information
- Location: Lianxi District, Jiujiang, Jiangxi; China
- Operated by: Nanchang Railway Bureau, China Railway Corporation
- Lines: Beijing–Kowloon railway, Hefei–Jiujiang railway, Tongling–Jiujiang railway, Nanchang–Jiujiang intercity railway Jiujiang–Quzhou railway
- Platforms: 3

History
- Opened: 1996

Jiujiang railway station (Chinese: 九江站; pinyin: Jiǔjiāng Zhàn) is a railway station located in Jiujiang, Jiangxi province, eastern China.

The station serves the Beijing–Kowloon railway, Nanchang–Jiujiang intercity railway, Hefei–Jiujiang railway, Tongling–Jiujiang railway, and Jiujiang–Quzhou railway.

== History ==
The station opened in 1996.

Preceding station	China Railway	Following station
Xiaochikou towards Beijing West	Beijing–Kowloon railway	Lushan towards Hung Hom
Xiaochikou towards Hefei	Hefei–Jiujiang railway	Terminus
Hukou towards Tongling	Tongling–Jiujiang railway	Terminus
Terminus	Jiujiang–Quzhou railway	Hukou towards Quzhou
Preceding station	China Railway High-speed	Following station
Lushan towards Nanchang West	Nanchang–Jiujiang intercity railway	Terminus
