= Lianxi, Jiujiang =

Lianxi 濂溪区
- District
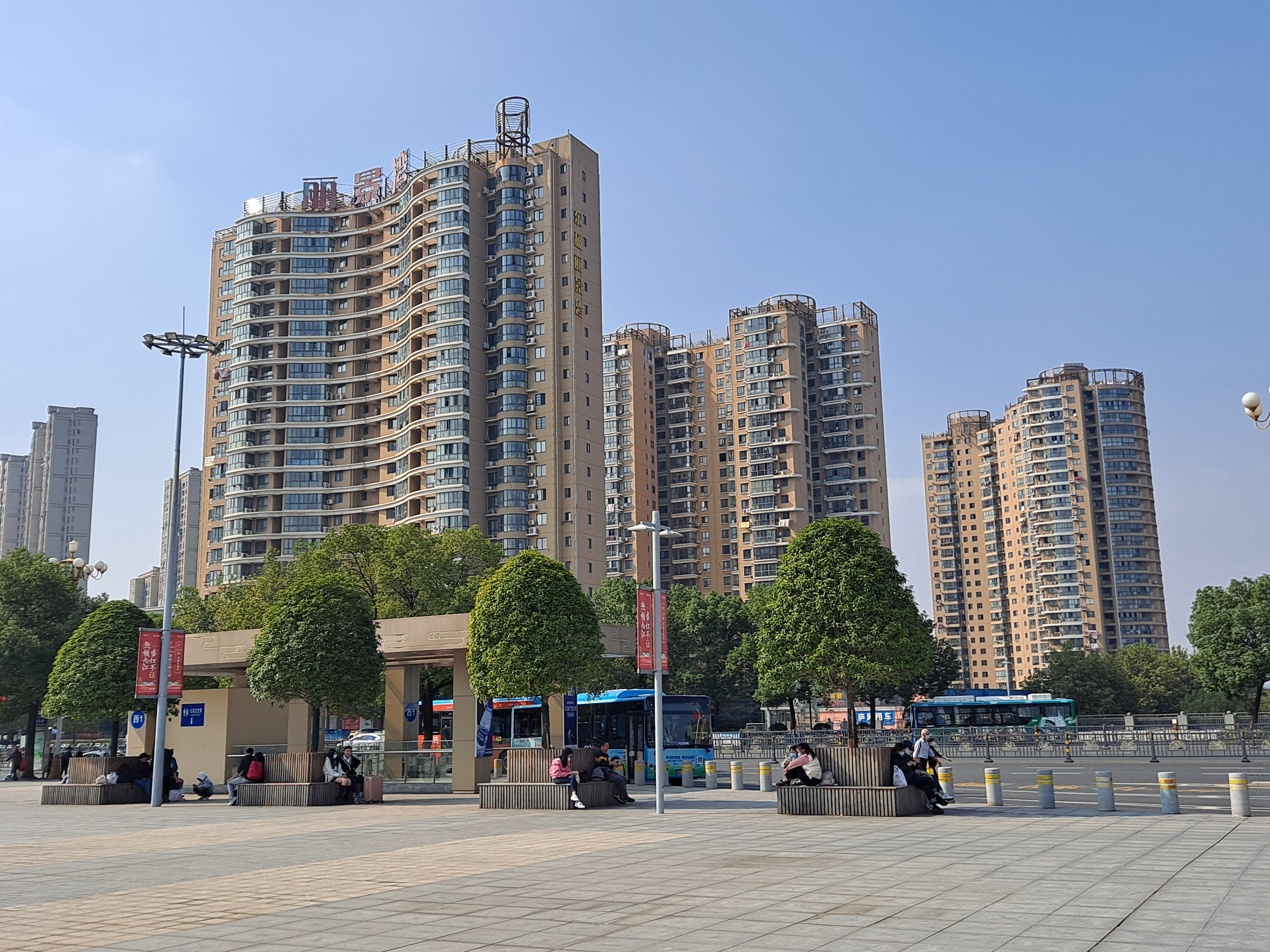
- Interactive map of Lianxi
- Coordinates: 29°40′10″N 115°59′22″E
- Country: People's Republic of China
- Province: Jiangxi
- Prefecture-level city: Jiujiang

Area
  - Total: 369.8 km^{2} (142.8 sq mi)

Population (2018)
  - Total: 259,480
  - Density: 701.7/km^{2} (1,817/sq mi)
- Time zone: UTC+8 (China Standard)
- Postal code: 332005

Lianxi (simplified Chinese: 濂溪区; traditional Chinese: 濂溪區; pinyin: Liánxī Qū) is a district in Jiujiang, Jiangxi, China. It was formerly named Lushan District (Chinese: 庐山区), taking its name from Mount Lu, which was located inside its boundaries. In April 2016, jurisdiction for Mount Lu and Guling town was transferred to the newly renamed County-level Lushan City (formerly Xingzi County), and Lushan District was renamed as Lianxi.

== Administrative divisions ==
Lianxi District has 3 subdistricts, 5 towns and 2 townships.

3 subdistricts

- Shili (十里街道)
- Wuli (五里街道)
- Qilihu (七里湖街道)

5 towns

- Gutang (姑塘镇)
- Weijia (威家镇)
- Xingang (新港镇)
- Lianhua (莲花镇)
- Saiyang (赛阳镇)
- Guling (牯岭镇) - has been merged into Lushan City
- Haihui (海会镇) - has been merged into Lushan City

2 township

- Yujiahe (虞家河乡)
- Gaolong (高垅乡)

== See also ==
- Changjiu Intercity Railway
- Nanchang–Jiujiang Intercity Railway
- Jiujiang university
