= De'an County =

County in Jiangxi, China

De'an County 德安县 Teian
- County
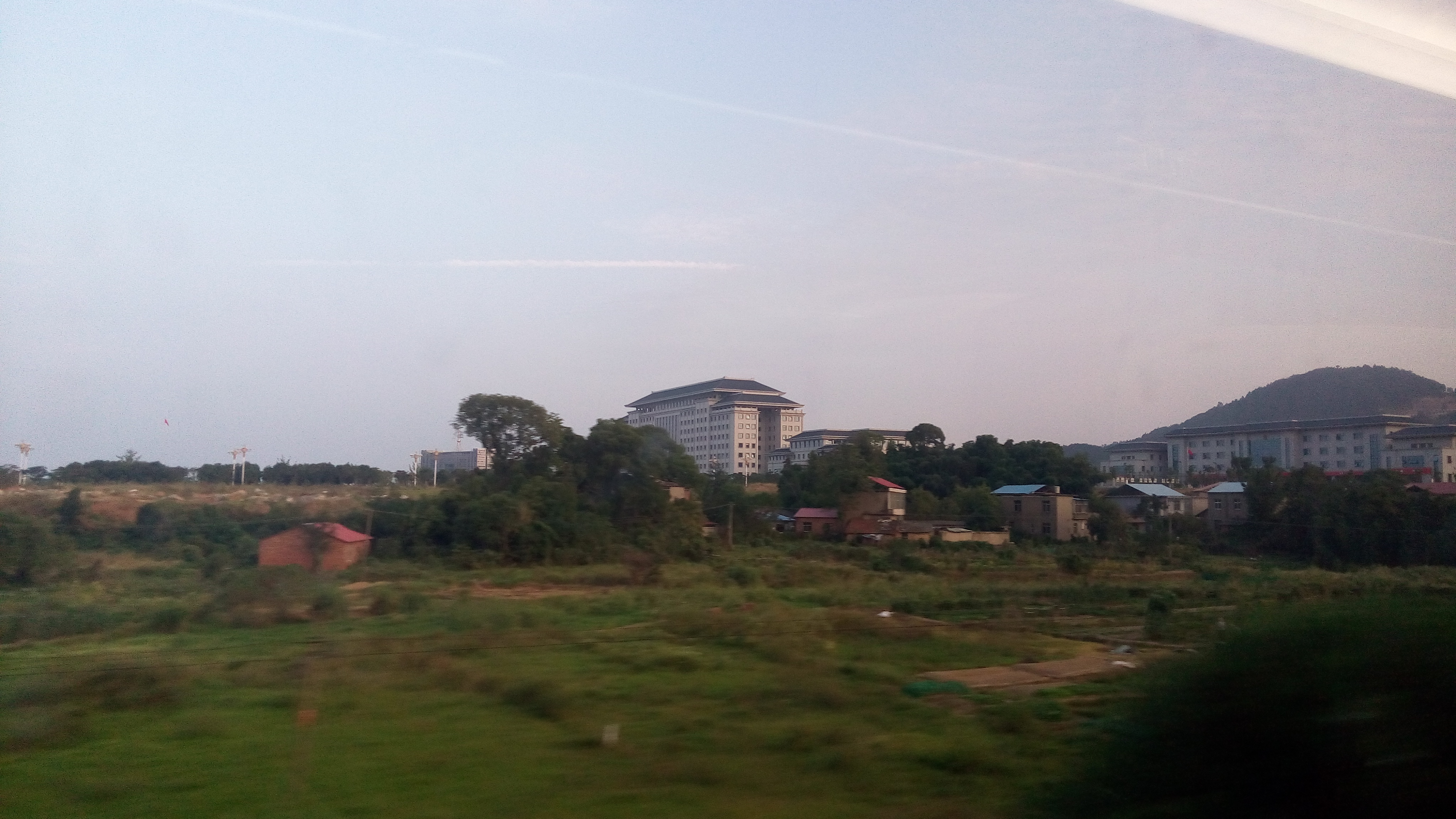

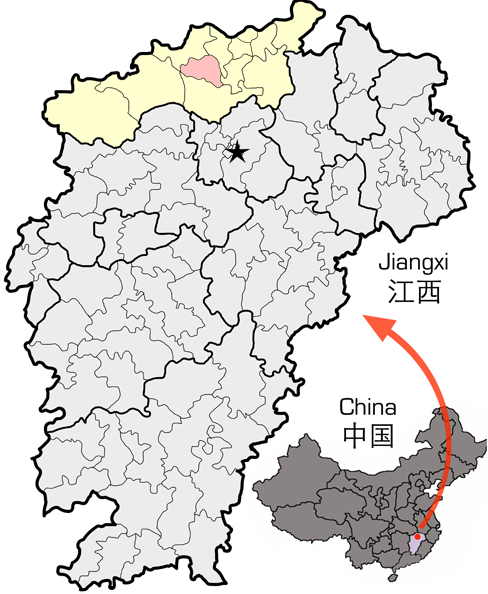
- Location of De'an County (red) within Jiujiang City (yellow) and Jiangxi
- Coordinates: 29°17′55″N 115°46′03″E
- Country: People's Republic of China
- Province: Jiangxi
- Prefecture-level city: Jiujiang

Area
  - Total: 863 km^{2} (333 sq mi)

Population (2018)
  - Total: 161,000
  - Density: 187/km^{2} (483/sq mi)
- Time zone: UTC+8 (China Standard)
- Postal code: 330400

De'an (Chinese: 德安; pinyin: Dé'ān) is a county under the jurisdiction of the prefecture-level city of Jiujiang in the north of Jiangxi Province, China. Its total area is 939.40 km^{2} (362.70 sq mi), and the population is 166,000 as of 2010. This county is known for the residence of the parents of film director Ang Lee as well as fashion designer, model, and actress Lü Yan.

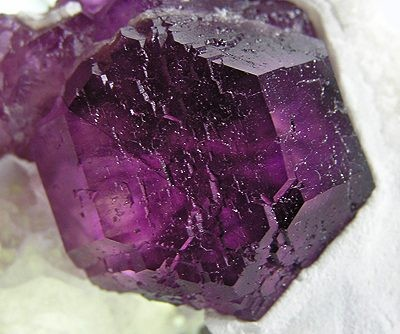
Gemmy purple fluorite from Wushan Fluorite mine, De'an County.

== Administrative divisions ==
De'an County is divided to 4 towns and 9 townships.

4 towns

- Puting (蒲亭镇)
- Nieqiao (聂桥镇)
- Cheqiao (车桥镇)
- Fenglin (丰林镇)

9 townships

- Baota (宝塔乡)
- Hedong (河东乡)
- Gaotang (高塘乡)
- Linquan (林泉乡)
- Wushan (吴山乡)
- Moxi (磨溪乡)
- Aimin (爱民乡)
- Zouqiao (邹桥乡)
- Tangshan (塘山乡)

== Climate ==
Climate data for De'an, elevation 81 m (266 ft), (1991–2020 normals, extremes 1981–present)
Month	Jan	Feb	Mar	Apr	May	Jun	Jul	Aug	Sep	Oct	Nov	Dec	Year
Record high °C (°F)	24.8 (76.6)	28.6 (83.5)	32.6 (90.7)	34.0 (93.2)	35.7 (96.3)	36.8 (98.2)	39.7 (103.5)	39.1 (102.4)	38.5 (101.3)	35.4 (95.7)	31.1 (88.0)	22.9 (73.2)	39.7 (103.5)
Mean daily maximum °C (°F)	8.8 (47.8)	11.8 (53.2)	15.9 (60.6)	22.2 (72.0)	26.9 (80.4)	29.5 (85.1)	33.0 (91.4)	32.8 (91.0)	29.2 (84.6)	24.3 (75.7)	17.9 (64.2)	11.6 (52.9)	22.0 (71.6)
Daily mean °C (°F)	4.6 (40.3)	7.2 (45.0)	11.2 (52.2)	17.2 (63.0)	22.1 (71.8)	25.4 (77.7)	28.7 (83.7)	28.1 (82.6)	24.3 (75.7)	18.8 (65.8)	12.5 (54.5)	6.7 (44.1)	17.2 (63.0)
Mean daily minimum °C (°F)	1.6 (34.9)	3.9 (39.0)	7.5 (45.5)	13.1 (55.6)	18.0 (64.4)	22.0 (71.6)	25.0 (77.0)	24.6 (76.3)	20.7 (69.3)	14.9 (58.8)	8.6 (47.5)	3.2 (37.8)	13.6 (56.5)
Record low °C (°F)	−7.4 (18.7)	−8.0 (17.6)	−4.6 (23.7)	−0.7 (30.7)	8.4 (47.1)	13.2 (55.8)	17.5 (63.5)	18.1 (64.6)	9.9 (49.8)	1.3 (34.3)	−4.0 (24.8)	−11.9 (10.6)	−11.9 (10.6)
Average precipitation mm (inches)	72.0 (2.83)	83.6 (3.29)	149.1 (5.87)	174.8 (6.88)	187.8 (7.39)	241.0 (9.49)	181.0 (7.13)	143.7 (5.66)	77.0 (3.03)	53.5 (2.11)	66.3 (2.61)	44.7 (1.76)	1,474.5 (58.05)
Average precipitation days (≥ 0.1 mm)	13.0	12.2	16.1	15.4	15.3	15.9	12.1	12.0	7.6	7.3	9.6	9.7	146.2
Average snowy days	4.0	2.3	0.6	0	0	0	0	0	0	0	0.2	1.6	8.7
Average relative humidity (%)	78	78	80	79	80	84	80	80	78	74	77	75	79
Mean monthly sunshine hours	102.5	100.8	118.9	145.3	166.6	153.0	233.5	228.7	194.0	180.0	145.3	136.7	1,905.3
Percentage possible sunshine	31	32	32	38	39	37	55	57	53	51	46	43	43
Source: China Meteorological Administration

== See also ==
- De'an Railway Station
- Nanchang–Jiujiang Intercity Railway
