= Nanchang–Jiujiang intercity railway =

Railway line in Jiangxi, China

Nanchang–Jiujiang intercity railway 昌九城际铁路
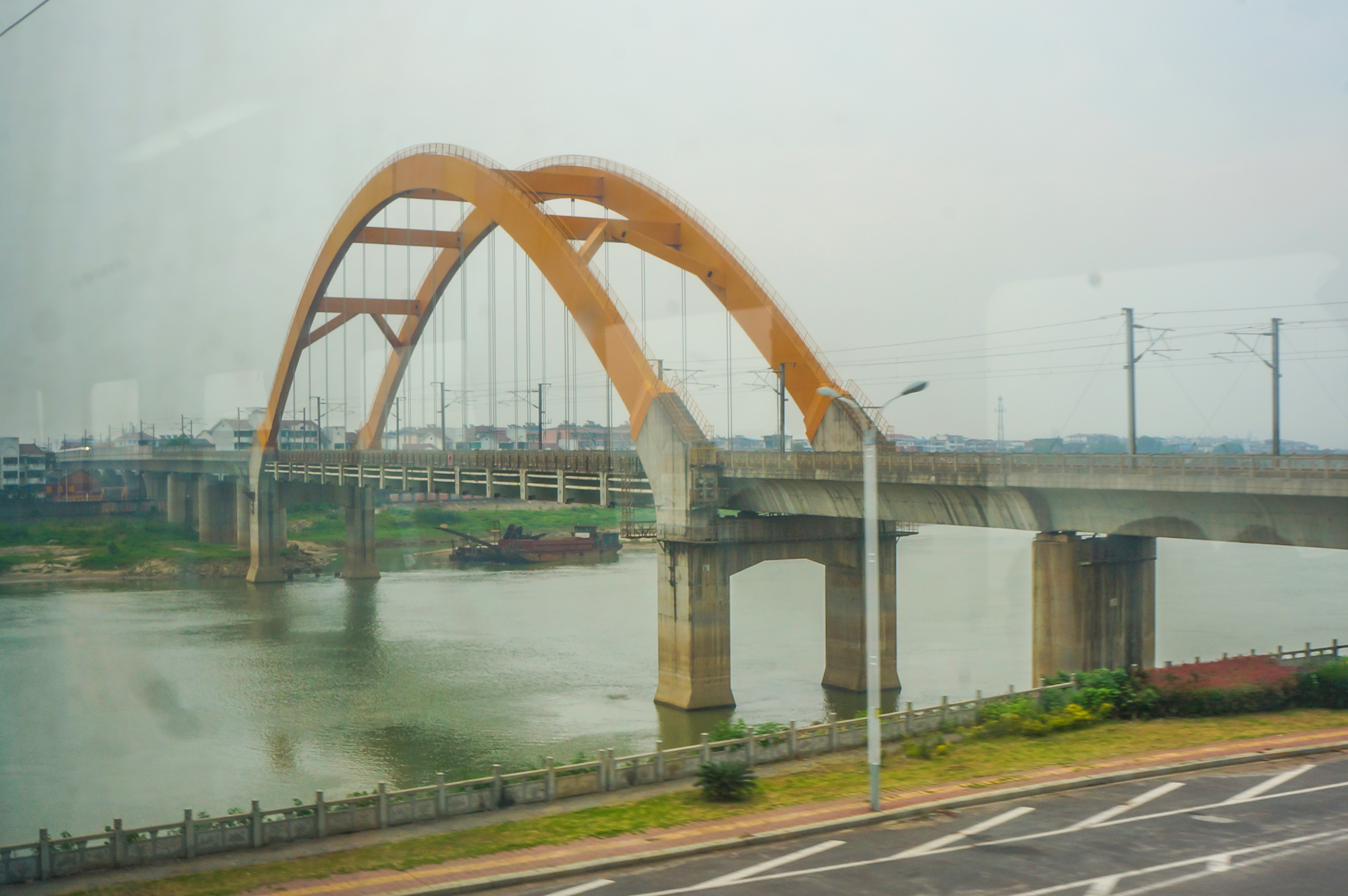
- Nanchang–Jiujiang intercity railway

Overview
- Status: Operational
- Locale: Jiangxi, China
- Termini: Nanchang West; Jiujiang
- Stations: 6

Service
- Type: High-speed rail
- Operator: China Railway Nanchang Group

History
- Opened: September 20, 2010

Technical
- Line length: 131 km (81 mi)
- Track gauge: 1,435 mm (4 ft 8 1/2 in) standard gauge
- Operating speed: 250 km/h (160 mph)

The Nanchang–Jiujiang intercity railway (simplified Chinese: 昌九城际铁路; traditional Chinese: 昌九城際鐵路; pinyin: Chāng-Jiǔ chéngjì tiělù) is an intercity high-speed railway operated by China Railway Nanchang Group, connecting Nanchang (the provincial capital) and Jiujiang, in Jiangxi Province, China. It is the first newly constructed high-speed railway in Jiangxi Province.

At Jiujiang, the railway connects with the Wuhan–Jiujiang Passenger Railway, opened in 2017, providing a continuous high-speed line between Nanchang and Wuhan.

== Stations ==
- Jiujiang
- Lushan
- De'an
- Gongqingcheng
- Yongxiu
- Nanchang West

== See also ==
Nanchang–Jiujiang high-speed railway: runs roughly parallel to this railway but will have a higher maximum speed, 350 kilometres (220 mi), and will end at Lushan railway station in Chaisang District rather than Jiujiang railway station in Lianxi District.
