= Nanchang West railway station =

Railway station in Nanchang

Nanchangxi 南昌西
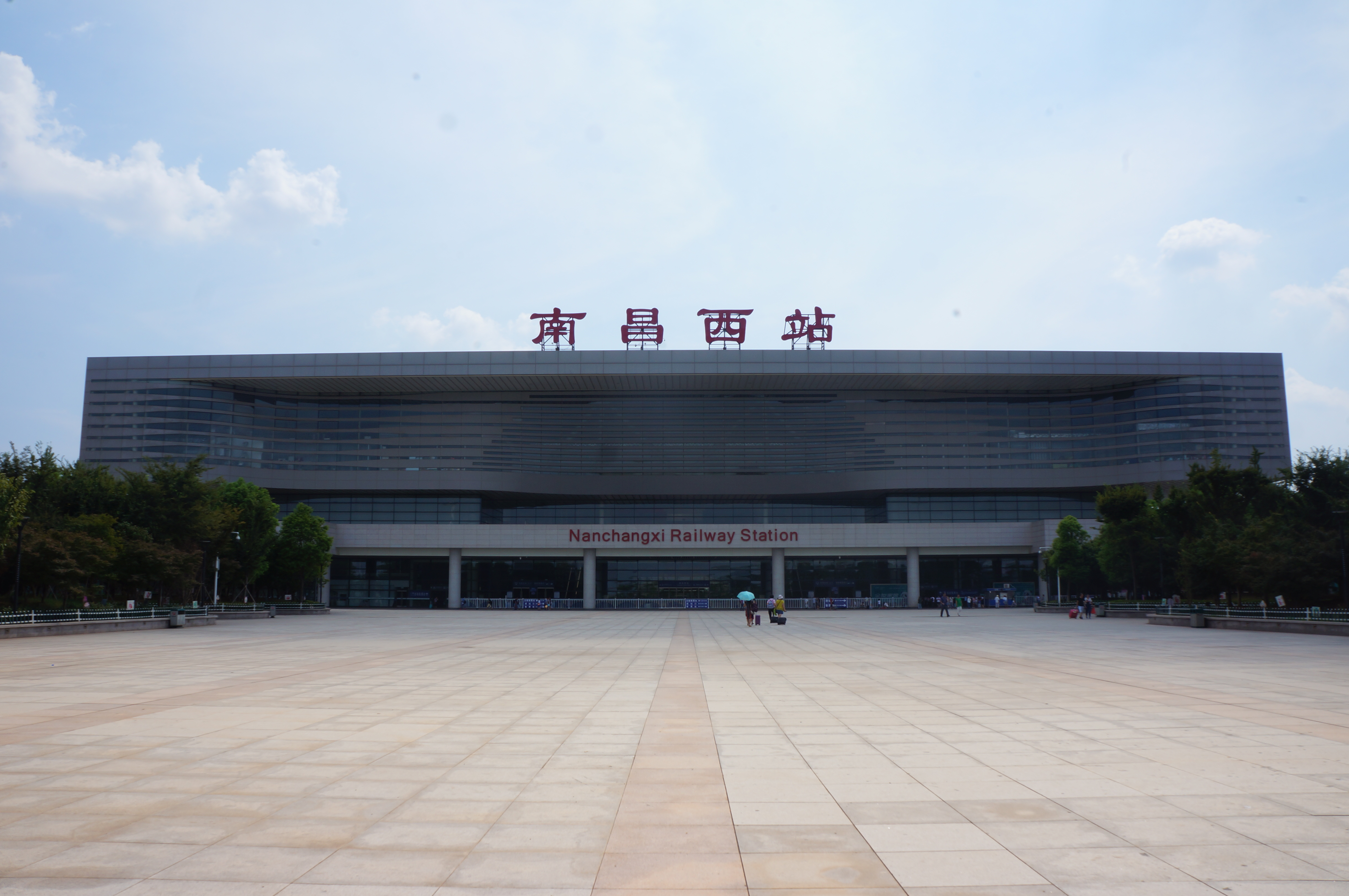
- Façade of Nanchangxi railway station

General information
- Location: Xinjian District, Nanchang, Jiangxi; China
- Coordinates: 28°37′34″N 115°47′16″E
- Operator: China Railway
- Lines: Shanghai–Kunming High-Speed Railway, Nanchang–Jiujiang Intercity Railway, Xiangtang–Putian Railway

Other information
- Station code: TMIS code: 25403; Telegraph code: NXG; Pinyin code: NCX
- Classification: 1st class station

History
- Opened: 26 September 2013

Services
Preceding station	China Railway High-speed	Following station
Jinxian South towards Shanghai Hongqiao	Shanghai–Kunming high-speed railway	Gao'an towards Kunming South
Location

Nanchang West or Nanchangxi (Chinese: 南昌西站; pinyin: Nánchāngxī zhàn; lit. 'Nanchang west station') is a railway station on the Shanghai–Kunming and Hangzhou–Changsha high-speed lines located in Nanchang, Jiangxi, China. The foundation was laid in August 2010 and the station opened to service on 26 September 2013. The station building occupies an area of 114,500 square metres (1,232,000 sq ft). Nanchangxi is serviced by two side platforms and ten island platforms.

Nanchangxi is situated on Line 2 of the Nanchang Metro, which opened on 18 August 2017.

== See also ==
- Nanchang railway station, the central station in Nanchang
