= Beijing–Kowloon railway =

North-south train route in China

Beijing–Kowloon railway 京九铁路 京九鐵路

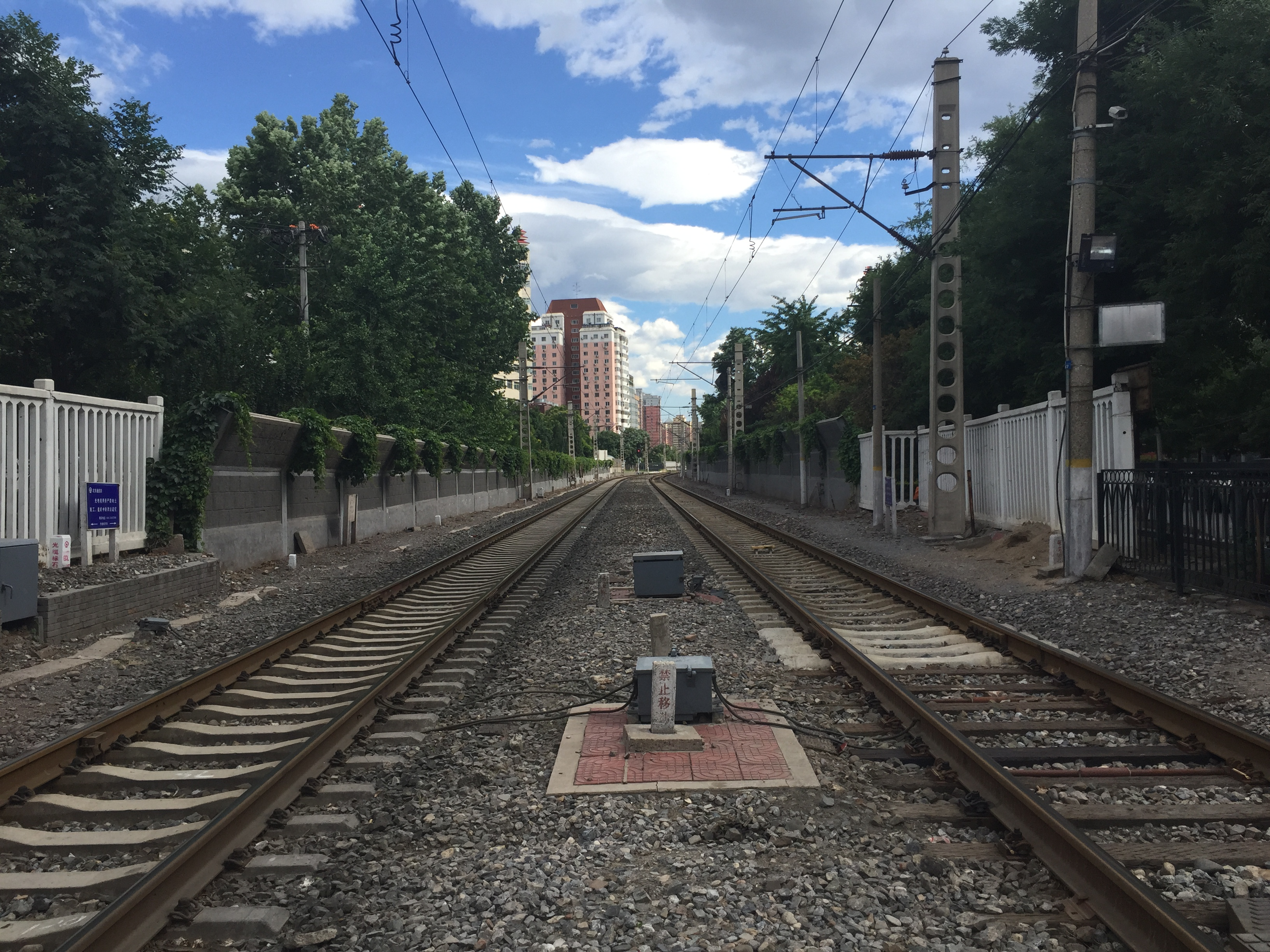
- The Shoupakou level crossing of Beijing–Kowloon railway near Guang'anmen, Beijing

Overview
- Status: In operation
- Locale: Beijing, Hebei, Shandong, Henan, Anhui, Hubei, Jiangxi, Guangdong, Hong Kong
- Termini: Beijing West; Shenzhen

Service
- Type: Heavy rail
- System: China Railway
- Operator(s): China Railway

History
- Opened: 1 September 1996; 29 years ago

Technical
- Line length: 2,311 km (1,436 mi)
- Track gauge: 1,435 mm (4 ft 8 1/2 in)
- Electrification: 25 kV, 50 Hz Overhead catenary
- Operating speed: 150–200 km/h (93–124 mph)

Beijing–Kowloon railway
- Simplified Chinese: 京九铁路
- Traditional Chinese: 京九鐵路
Transcriptions
Standard Mandarin
- Hanyu Pinyin: Jīngjiǔ tiělù
Yue: Cantonese
- Jyutping: ging1 gau2 tit3 lou6

Alternative Chinese name
- Simplified Chinese: 京九线
- Traditional Chinese: 京九線
Transcriptions
Standard Mandarin
- Hanyu Pinyin: Jīngjiǔ Xiàn
Yue: Cantonese
- Jyutping: ging1 gau2 sin3

The Beijing–Kowloon railway, also known as the Jingjiu railway (simplified Chinese: 京九铁路 or 京九线; traditional Chinese: 京九鐵路 or 京九線) is a dual track railway connecting Beijing West railway station in Beijing to Shenzhen railway station in Shenzhen, Guangdong Province.

It was previously connected with Hong Kong's East Rail line across the border. All services south of Shenzhen were discontinued in July 2020, citing high-speed rail as a result.

== History ==
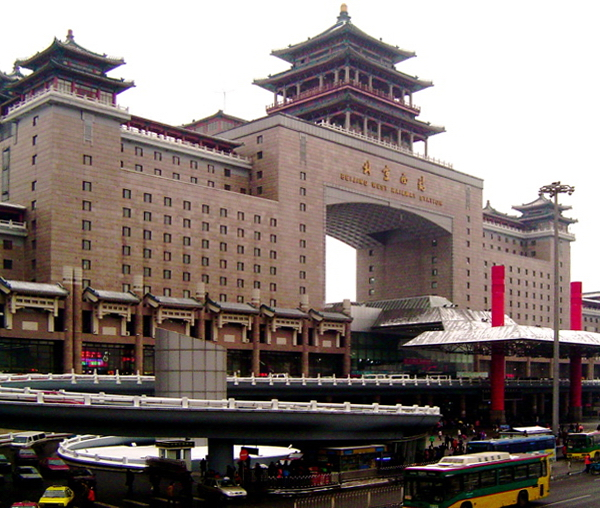
Beijing West station

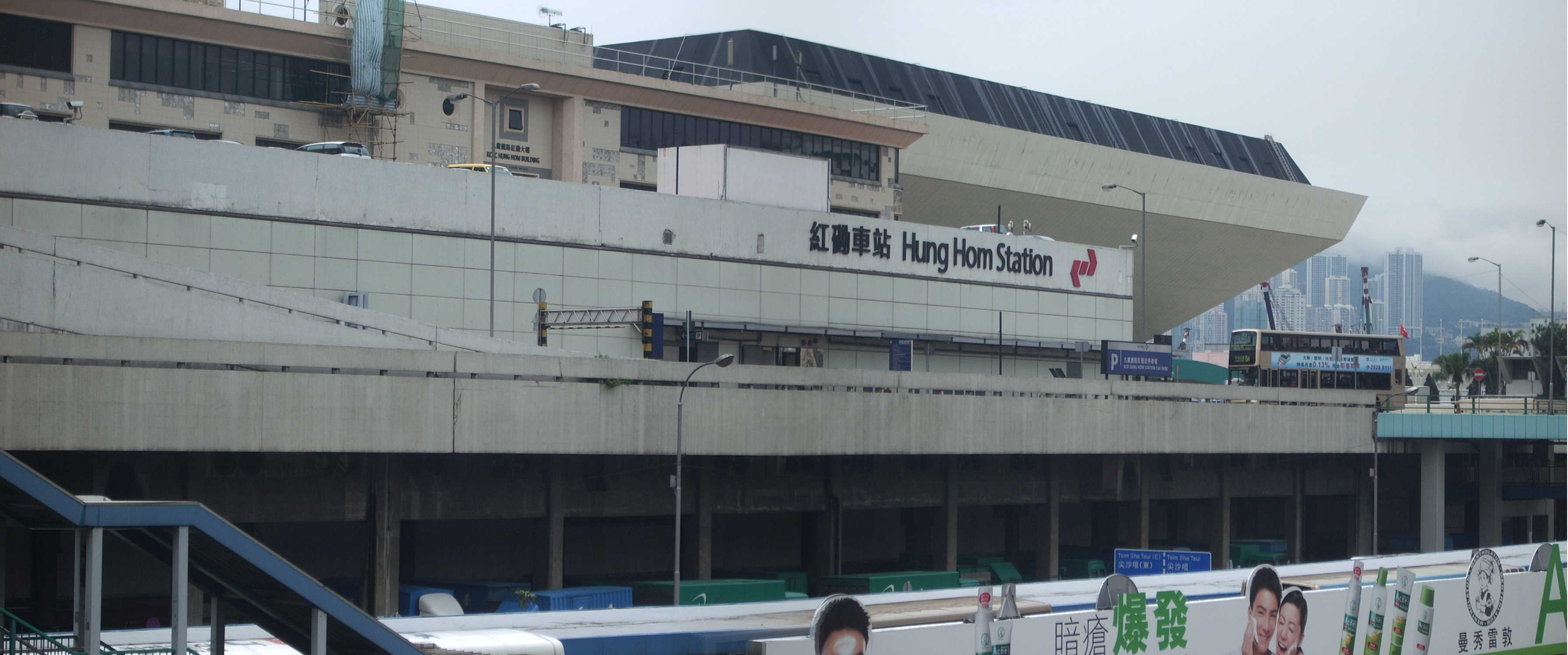
The façade of Hung Hom station (Hong Kong Coliseum in the background)

Construction of the railway began in February 1993. It was opened on 1 September 1996, connecting Beijing and Shenzhen (and thereupon with Kowloon through the KCR East Rail) through Tianjin, Hebei, Shandong, Henan, Anhui, Hubei, Jiangxi and Guangdong, with a length of 2,397 kilometres (1,489 mi). It has 790 bridges and 160 tunnels. The Jiujiang Yangtze River Bridge, at a length of 7,679 metres (25,194 ft), is the longest across the Yangtze River. Located between Jinghu railway (Beijing–Shanghai) and Jingguang railway (Beijing–Guangzhou) with a designed annual traffic volume of 70 million tonne, it was built to alleviate the congested Jingguang railway, and to foster development in the areas to the east of Jingguang railway.

The idea had been proposed for a long time, and some of the sections, such as the Jiujiang Yangtze River Bridge, were built before construction of the whole line officially began. Some were converted from existing sections, such as between Jiujiang and Nanchang, and Fuyang and Shangqiu.

The railway uses the same line as Guangmeishan railway (Guangzhou–Meizhou–Shantou railway) between Longchuan and Dongguan. It joins the Guangshen railway (Guangzhou–Shenzhen railway, formerly the Chinese section of the Kowloon–Canton railway) at Dongguan, and follows the same route. Within Hong Kong, it shares the same pair of tracks with the East Rail line (formerly British section of the Kowloon–Canton railway).

Beijing–Kowloon through train services was previously provided on the Jingguang railway and Guangshen railway, instead of the Jingjiu railway, because Beijing-Kowloon line emphasizes freight traffic and pass through less major cities. Passengers using such service are required to go through customs and immigration checks for the cross-border service. However, the conventional cross-border services have been discontinued.

Electrification of the line between Beijing West and Lehua was completed in May 2010 allowing operating speeds to increase from 160 to 200 km/h (99 to 124 mph) with provisions for operation of double-stack container trains.

== Places served ==
- Beijing
- Gu'an County
- Bazhou
- Renqiu
- Suning
- Shenzhou
- Hengshui
- Zaoqiang
- Daying
- Nangong
- Qinghecheng
- Linqing
- Liaocheng
- Yanggu
- Taiqian
- Liangshan
- Heze
- Caoxian
- Shangqiu
- Bozhou
- Santangji
- Fuyang
- Funan
- Huaibin
- Huangchuan
- Xinxian
- Macheng
- Xinzhou
- Huangzhou
- Xishui
- Wuxue
- Jiujiang
- Lushan
- De'an
- Yongxiu
- Nanchang
- Xiangtang
- Fengcheng
- Zhangshu
- Xingan
- Xiajiang
- Jishui
- Ji'an
- Taihe
- Xingguo
- Ganzhou
- Nankang
- Xinfeng
- Longnan
- Dingnan
- Heping
- Longchuan
- Heyuan
- Huizhou
- Dongguan
- Shenzhen

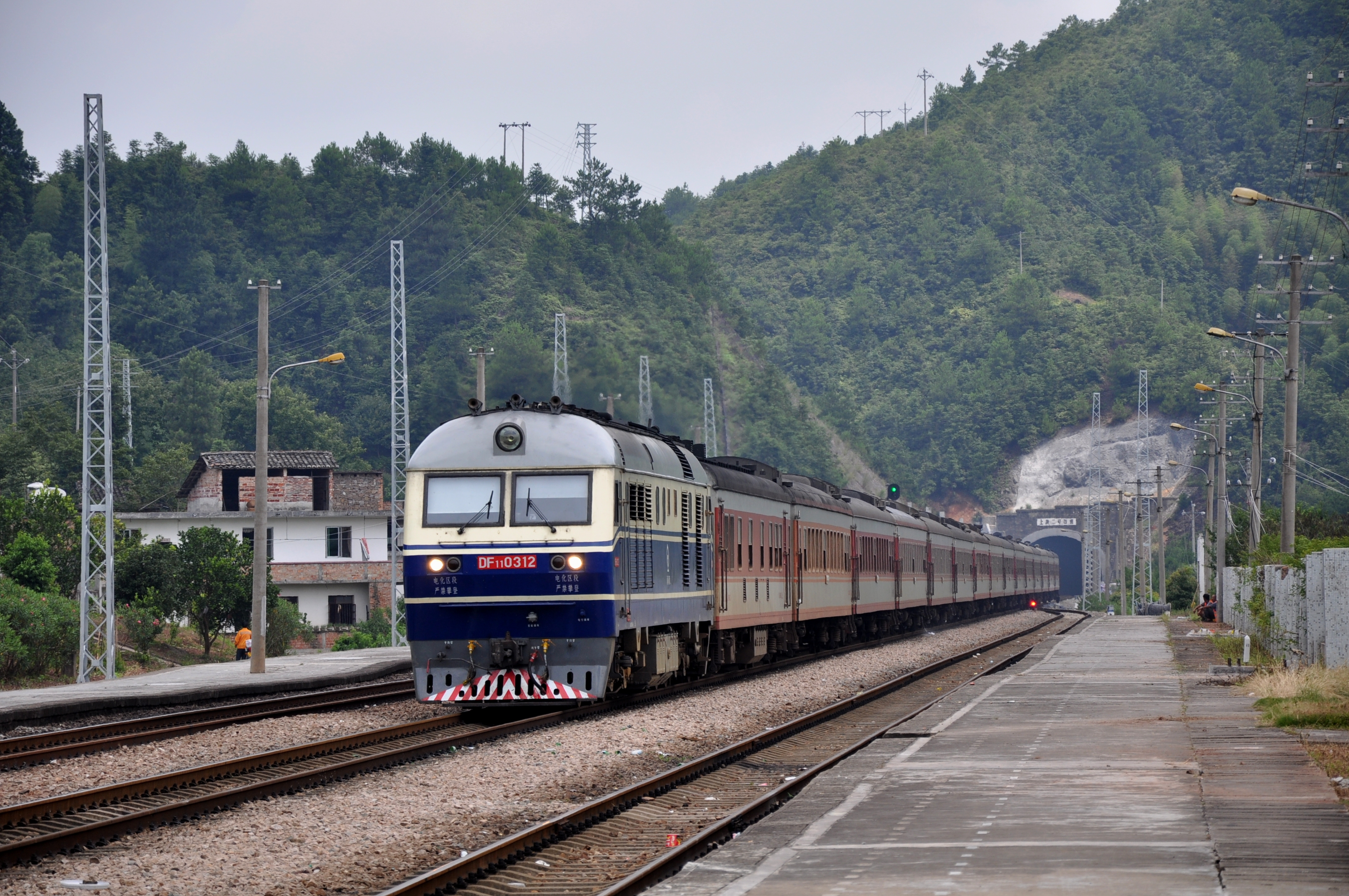
Beijing–Kowloon railway at the Shangling station in Heping County, Guangdong province

== See also ==
- Rail transport in China
- List of railway lines in China
- Guangzhou–Shenzhen Railway
- Beijing–Guangzhou high-speed railway
- China Railways
