= Yituanheqi =

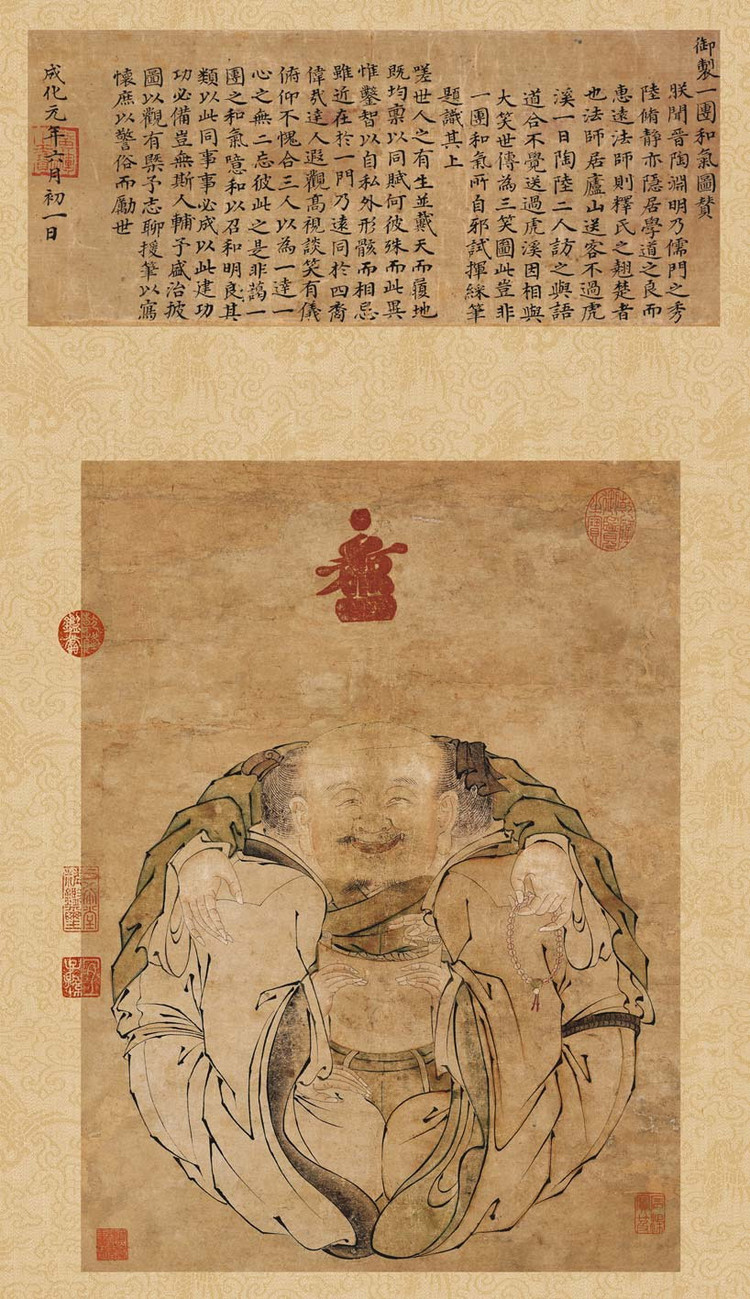
Yituanheqi drawn by Chenghua Emperor

Yituanheqi (simplified Chinese: 一团和气; traditional Chinese: 一團和氣; pinyin: Yītuán Héqì) is a gongbi picture by Chenghua Emperor. The painting depicts Tao Yuanming, Lu Xiujing, and Zen Master Hui Yuan embracing each other, with the three, together, looking like Maitreya. This painting reflects the traditional Chinese syncretic concept of the amalgamation of the three teachings. In concept, it was similar to the anecdotal tale of Three laughs at Tiger Brook.
