= History of Jiangxi =

History of Chinese province

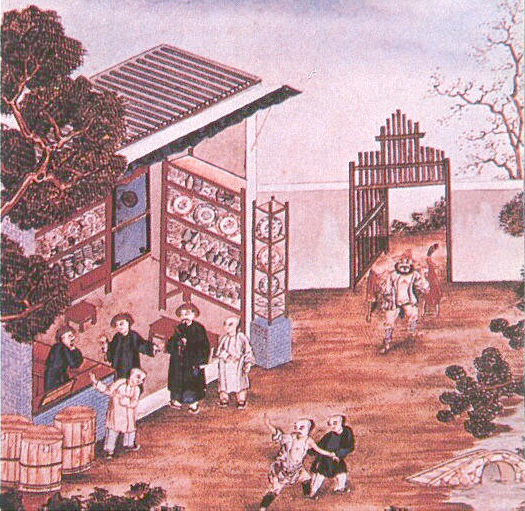
Ancient porcelain shop in Jingdezhen.

The history of Jiangxi stretches from Lower Paleolithic times to the present, as Jiangxi was already inhabited by humans one million years ago. Until recently, the earliest known Jiangxi pottery was dated to around 11000 BC,; however, recent finds show that the absolutely earliest known pottery, from ca. 18,000 BC, comes from Xianren Cave in Jiangxi. In this Chinese province the full Neolithic period began before 8000 BC, as represented by Xianrendong culture in discovering cultivated rice over 10,000 years ago. This period is followed by the Bronze Age around 2000 BC, represented by Wucheng culture and Dayangzhou culture, and by the Iron Age prior to 500 BC.

The first recorded people inhabited in Jiangxi are Baiyue and their influence is still found in modern-day Gan Chinese dialects. Jiangxi was then respectively ruled by Wu, Yue, Chu in the 1st millennium BC and firstly conquered by the Chinese dynasty of Han around 200 BC.

Centred on the Gan River valley, Jiangxi provides the main north–south transport route. Its encirclement by mountains has allowed the lands of Jiangxi to develop as a separate geographic region and an independent cultural entity. They provide one of the communication routes from the North China Plain and the Yangzi River valley to the territory of modern Guangdong. As a result, Jiangxi has been strategically important throughout much of its history.

== Early history ==
Jiangxi was outside the sphere of influence of early Chinese civilization during the Shang dynasty (16th to 11th centuries). Information about this era is scarce, but it is likely that peoples collectively known as the Yue inhabited the region.

During the Spring and Autumn period, the northern part of modern Jiangxi formed the western frontier of the state of Wu. Two settlements are known of at this time: Ai (艾), and Po (番, later 潘). After Wu was conquered by the state of Yue (a power based in modern northern Zhejiang) in 473 BC, the state of Chu (based in modern Hubei) took over northern Jiangxi and there may have been some Yue influence in the south. Chu subjugated Yue in 333 BC, and was in turn subjugated by the state of Qin in 221 BC. Qin established the Qin dynasty in that same year, the first unified Chinese state.

== Imperial China ==
Han dynasty counties of Yuzhang commandery
Name		Present location
Nanchang	南昌	Nanchang municipality
Luling	廬陵	Ji'an municipality
Pengze	彭澤	Hukou County
Poyang	鄱陽	Poyang County
Yuhan	餘汗	northeast of Yugan County
Chaisang	柴桑	southwest of modern Jiujiang
Gan	贛	Ganzhou municipality
Xin'gan	新淦	Zhangshu municipality
Nancheng	南城	east of Nancheng County
Yichun	宜春	Yichun municipality
Yudu	雩都	northeast of Yudu County
Ai	艾	west of Xiushui County
Anping	安平	southeast of Anfu County
Haihun	海昏	Yongxiu County
Liling	曆陵	east of De'an County
Jiancheng	建成	Gao'an County
Chaoyang		west of Duchang County
Nanye		southwest of Nankang County

The unification of China by the Qin dynasty saw the incorporation of Jiangxi into the Qin empire. The First Emperor of Qin established seven counties in Jiangxi, all of them administered from the commandery seat of Jiujiang, located north of the Yangzi in modern Anhui. All of the commandery seats were located along the Gan River system. Most were no more than a day or two separated and protected one of the Qin routes to the newly incorporated territories further south in Nanhai (modern Guangzhou). Military settlements were known to have existed at least two of the counties. The Qin colonisation formed the earliest settlement structure in Jiangxi and which for the most part, has survived to the present day.

The commandery of Yuzhang (豫章) was established in northern Jiangxi at the beginning of the Han dynasty, possibly before the death of Xiang Yu in 202 BC. In 201, eight commanderies were added to the original seven of Qin, and three more were established in later years. For most of the Han era the commandery's eighteen counties covered most of the modern province of Jiangxi. The county seats of Nanchang, Gan, Yudu, Luling among others are located directly on modern municipalities. Others counties, however, have been moved and abolished in later centuries.

In 291 AD, during the Western Jin dynasty, Jiangxi became its own zhou called Jiangzhou (江州). During the Northern and Southern dynasties, Jiangxi was under the control of the southern dynasties, and the number of zhou slowly grew.

During the Sui dynasty, there were seven commanderies and twenty-four counties in Jiangxi. During the Tang dynasty, another commandery and fourteen counties were added. Commanderies were then abolished, becoming zhou (henceforth translated as "prefectures" rather than "provinces").

Circuits were established during the Tang dynasty as a new top-level administrative division. At first Jiangxi was part of the Jiangnan Circuit (lit. "Circuit south of the Yangtze"). In 733, this circuit was divided into western and eastern halves. Jiangxi was found in the western half, which was called Jiangnanxi Circuit (lit. "Western circuits south of the Yangtze"). This is the source of the modern name "Jiangxi".

As a circuit, Jiangnanxi contained eight prefectures (zhou):

Hong	洪	hóng
Rao	饒	ráo
Qian	虔	qián
Ji	吉	jí

Jiang	江	jiāng
Yuan	袁	yuán
Fu	撫	fǔ
Xin	信	xìn

Six prefectures and four military prefectures (軍 jun) replaced the previous prefectures (with fifty-five counties).

The Tang dynasty collapsed in 907, heralding the division of the Five Dynasties and Ten Kingdoms period. Jiangxi first belonged to Wu (吳), then to Southern Tang (南唐). Both states were based in modern-day Nanjing, further down the Yangtze River.

During the Song dynasty, Jiangnanxi Circuit was reestablished with nine prefectures and four army districts (with sixty-eight districts).

During the Yuan dynasty, the circuit was divided into thirteen different circuits, and Jiangxi Province was established for the first time. This province also included the majority of modern Guangdong. Jiangxi acquired (more or less) its modern borders during the Ming dynasty after Guangdong was separated out. There has been little change to the borders of Jiangxi since.

== Modern time ==
After the fall of the Qing dynasty, Jiangxi became one of the earliest bases for the Communists and many peasants were recruited to join the growing people's revolution. The Nanchang Uprising took place in Jiangxi on August 1, 1927, during the Chinese Civil War. Later the Communist leadership hid in the mountains of southern and western Jiangxi, hiding from the Kuomintang's attempts to eradicate them. In 1931, the Communists declared Jiangxi's independence from the Republic of China as the "Chinese Soviet Republic" which was formed in Ruijin (瑞金), sometimes called the "Former Red Capital" (红色故都), or just the "Red Capital". In 1935, after complete encirclement by the Nationalist forces, the Communists broke through and began the Long March to Yan'an.

Following the Doolittle Raid during World War II, most of the B-25 American crews that came down in China eventually made it to safety with the help of Chinese civilians and soldiers. The Chinese people who helped them, however, paid dearly for sheltering the Americans. The Imperial Japanese Army began the Zhejiang-Jiangxi Campaign to intimidate the Chinese from helping downed American airmen. The Japanese killed an estimated 250,000 civilians while searching for Doolittle's men.

== See also ==
- Jiangxi Provincial Parliament
