= Tao Yuanming =

Chinese poet (365–427)

Tao Yuanming 陶淵明
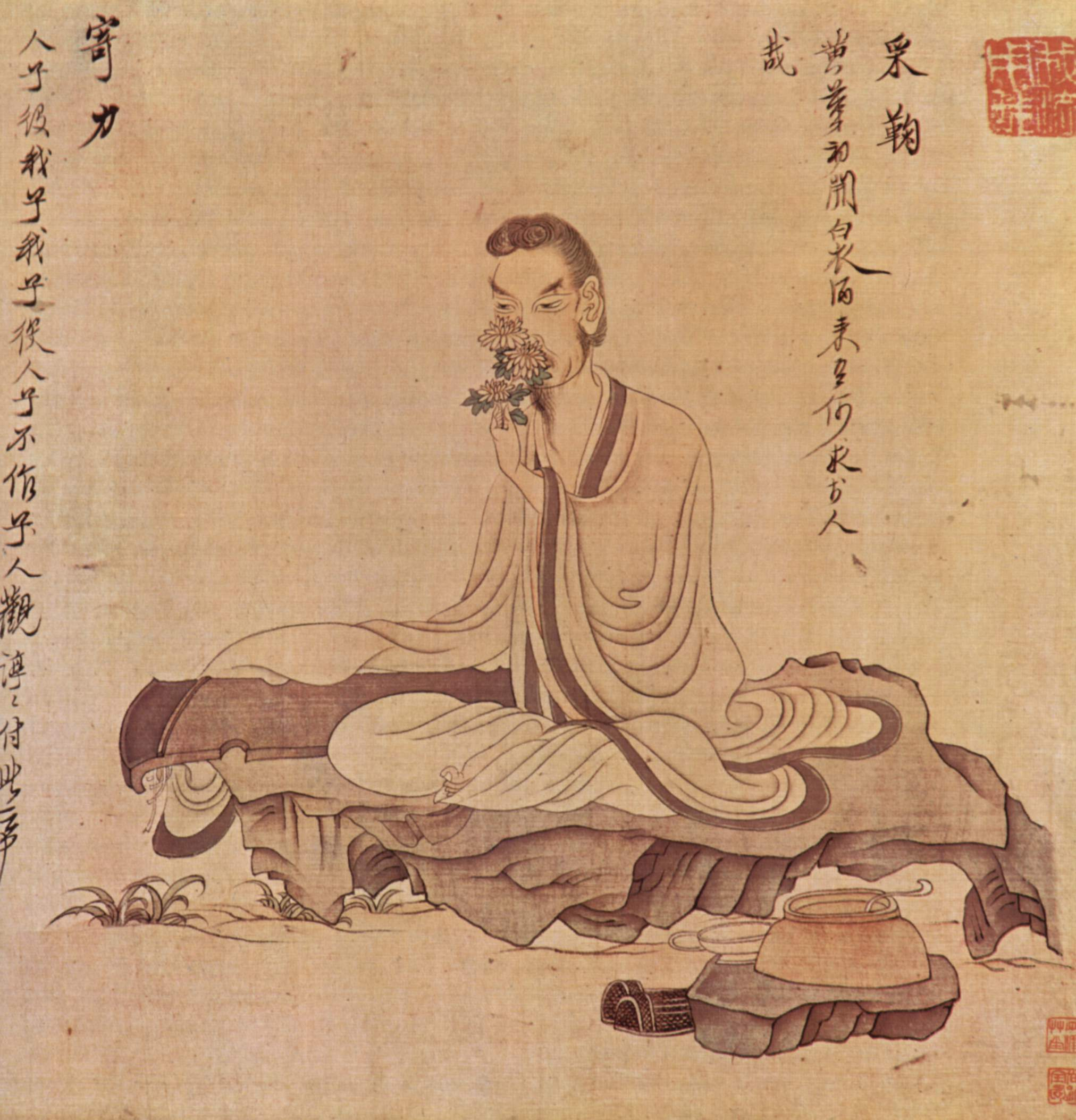
- Portrait of Tao Yuanming by Chen Hongshou
- Born: Tao Qian (陶潛) c. 365; Chaisang (modern-day Jiujiang, Jiangxi), Eastern Jin dynasty
- Died: 427; Liu Song dynasty
- Occupations: Poet, politician
- Writing career
- Notable work: Account of the Peach Blossom Spring

Tao Yuanming
- Traditional Chinese: 陶淵明
- Simplified Chinese: 陶渊明
Transcriptions
Standard Mandarin
- Hanyu Pinyin: Táo Yuānmíng
- Gwoyeu Romatzyh: Taur Iuanming
- Wade–Giles: T'ao^{2} Yüan^{1}-ming^{2}
- IPA: [tʰǎʊ ɥɛ́n.mǐŋ]
Yue: Cantonese
- Yale Romanization: Tòuh Yūn-mìhng
- Jyutping: Tou^{4} Jyun^{1}-ming^{4}
- IPA: [tʰɔw˩ jyn˥.mɪŋ˩]
Southern Min
- Tâi-lô: Tô Ian-bîng

Alternative Chinese name
- Chinese: 陶潛
- Literal meaning: (original name)
Transcriptions
Standard Mandarin
- Hanyu Pinyin: Táo Qián
- Gwoyeu Romatzyh: Taur Chyan
- Wade–Giles: T'ao^{2} Ch'ien^{2}
- IPA: [tʰǎʊ tɕʰjɛ̌n]
Yue: Cantonese
- Yale Romanization: Tòuh Chìhm
- Jyutping: Tou^{4} Cim^{4}
Southern Min
- Tâi-lô: Tô Tsiâm

Tao Yuanming (陶淵明; 365–427), also known as Tao Qian (陶潜), courtesy name Yuanliang (元亮), was a Chinese poet and politician. He was one of the best-known poets who lived during the Six Dynasties period. Tao Yuanming spent much of his life in reclusion, living in the countryside, farming, reading, drinking wine, receiving the occasional guest, and writing poems in which he reflected on the pleasures and difficulties of life and his decision to withdraw from civil service.

Tao's simple and direct style was somewhat at odds with the norms for literary writing in his time. From the Tang dynasty onward, he was closely associated with the practice of farming as a recluse. During the Northern Song dynasty, influential literati figures such as Su Shi declared him a paragon of authenticity and spontaneity in poetry, predicting that he would achieve lasting literary fame. But Tao's inclusion in the 6th-century literary anthology Wen Xuan implies he began to gain fame in his own era, at least in his birth area. Tao is now regarded as the foremost representative of Fields and Gardens poetry. He is also known for owning and appreciating an unstrung guqin, claiming that he did not need to bother with the sounds of the strings to value the instrument; this became a common literary reference, and also appears in later depictions of Tao such as his portrait by Chen Hongshou. Tao is also depicted in Jin Guliang's Wu Shuang Pu.

== Names ==
In the middle of his life, Tao changed his name (keeping his family name) from Tao Yuanming (traditional Chinese: 陶淵明; simplified Chinese: 陶渊明; pinyin: Táo Yuānmíng; Wade–Giles: T'ao Yüan-ming) to Tao Qian (simplified Chinese: 陶潜; traditional Chinese: 陶潛; pinyin: Táo Qián; Wade–Giles: T'ao Ch'ien). "Master of the Five Willows", another name he used when quite young, seems to be a sobriquet of his own invention. There is a surviving autobiographical essay from his youth in which Tao uses "Five Willows" to allude to himself. After this, he refers to himself in his earlier writings as "Yuanming"; but it is thought that with the Eastern Jin dynasty's demise in 420, he began to call himself "Qian", meaning "hiding", to signify his final withdrawal into the quiet life in the country and decision to avoid participation in the political scene. Tao Qian could also be translated "Recluse Tao", but this does not imply an eremitic lifestyle or extreme asceticism but rather a comfortable dwelling with family, friends, neighbors, musical instruments, wine, a nice library, and the beautiful scenery of a mountain farm—Tao Qing's compensation for giving up the lifestyle of Tao Yuanming, government servant.

The names Yuanliang (元亮), Shenming (深明), and Quanming (泉明) are all associated with Tao Yuanming. Some of this results from a naming taboo during the Tang dynasty, specifically that the characters for an emperor's name were impermissible to use either to write or even to casually pronounce. This taboo required the substitution of similar characters or words. As the "High Founder" of the Tang dynasty (posthumously titled Emperor Gaozu of Tang) had the personal name Li Yuan, the yuan (渊) character became taboo. Since this was the same as the yuan in Yuanming, various authors substituted the synonymous shen (深) for yuan—both referring to "depths".

== Life ==
=== Ancestry ===
Tao Yuanming's great-grandfather was the eminent Jin dynasty general and governor Tao Kan (259–334). His grandfather and father both served as government officials, rising to the level of county governor. But the family circumstances into which Tao Yuanming was born were moderate poverty and lack of much political influence. His father died when he was eight years old.

=== Personal background ===
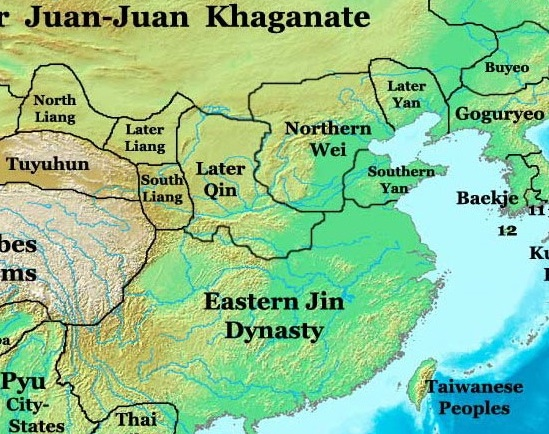
China (Eastern Jin dynasty) 400 CE

Tao Yuanming is considered a person of the Eastern Jin dynasty (316/317 – 419/420 CE) who outlived it. The last stable period in Chinese history had been during the Han dynasty (206 BCE – 220 CE), which was followed by the various political permutations known as the Three Kingdoms, one of these successor states being Cao Wei, founded and ruled by the Cao clan and briefly reunifying China. The Jin dynasty was founded and controlled by the Sima clan, the leading members of which were known for gaining and retaining power through corruption. This began before Tao Yuanming's birth, when Sima Yan usurped the throne of the Cao Wei dynasty's monarchal ruler, establishing its headquarters at the western capital of Chang'an and renaming the kingdom Jin. The dynasty was characterized by nepotism, corrupt politics, civil disorder, and violence. Various other clans vied for power. The Sima fought these as well as each other. The weaknesses inherent in the system culminated in the War of the Eight Princes (291–306), all eight princes being Simas. Immediate subsequent events resulted in certain rebels and bandits overruning the country. Many of these rebels were not ethnic Han Chinese, and they were generally referred to as the Five Barbarians, or Wu Hu, one of which was the Xiongnu empire; this event is thus known as the Uprising of the Five Barbarians. The Xiongnu founded their state of Han-Zhao and overthrew remnants of the Jin north of the Yangzi river, capturing and killing the two last Sima rulers of Western Jin, and in the process capturing the ancient capitals Luoyang and Chang'an. When the territory north of the Yangzi was captured, a prince in the south, Sima Rui, set up a new Jin dynasty state with a capital at Jiankang. This new Jin empire continued the traditions of violence and corruption of its predecessor, and this manifestation of Jin, known as Eastern Jin, was the one in which Tao Yuanming was born and lived most of his life. Control of Eastern Jin was usurped by a series of successors of various clans, and also subject to less successful rebellions by various warlords, while also facing external threats from other states such as Northern Wei, whose dynastic rulers were of the Tuoba (Tabgach) clan of the Xianbei. Eventually the whole Jin state was replaced by Liu Song, in 419/420. This new dynasty was named Song (like the much later, larger dynasty) and was ruled by the Liu family, and was also corrupt and short-lived. Versions of Tao Yuanming's biography in the Chinese source material vary as to his name and age during the various historical events of Eastern Jin and Liu Song known from other sources.

=== Birth ===
The mountain range to the south of modern Jiujiang

Tao Yuanming was born during the Eastern Jin dynasty (317–420), in Chaisang, which is now a district of the city of Jiujiang in Jiangxi Province.

==== Year of birth controversy ====
Tao Yuanming is generally believed to have been born in the year 365 CE in Chaisang (柴桑; modern Jiujiang), an area of great natural beauty. At the time Jiujiang was named Jiangzhou, and had an actively Buddhist governor. This birthdate is confirmed in Tao's biography in the Book of Jin, which says he was born "in the third year of the Xingning Reign Period of Emperor Ai", or Common Era year 365. But there is some uncertainty about this date, and the scholar Yuan Xingpei has argued that Tao was actually born in 352.

==== Place of birth ====
The name of Tao Yuanming's ancestral village, Chaisang, literally means "Mulberry-Bramble". Nearby sights have included Mountain Lu, Poyang Lake (then known as P'eng-li), as well as a good selection of natural features.

=== Younger years ===
Detailed information on Tao Yuanming's younger years is not known, but it is safe to say that they were lived in a difficult environment. When he was 18 or 19, both the invasion by the state of Former Qin (ruled by an ethnically Hu dynasty) and the events culminating in the Battle of Fei River (383) occurred; after great risk to the existence of Eastern Jin, this, against the odds, resulted in gains of territory north of the Yangzi, while also whetting Eastern Jin appetites for reconquering the former northern territories. Many events occurred during Tao's lifetime, including two revolts leading to the usurpation of the throne, and, in his old age, the overthrow of Eastern Jin.

==== Incident at Tiger Creek Bridge ====
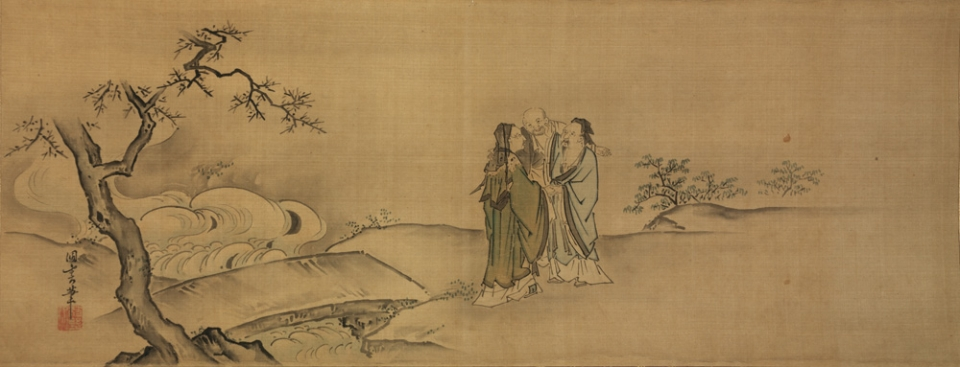
"Three Laughers of the Tiger Glen", hanging scroll: ink and colors on silk, 10 1/2 x 26 3/4 inches, 17th century

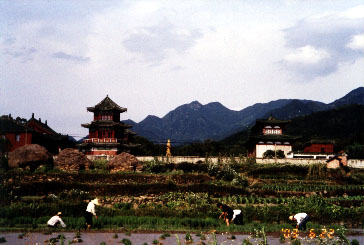
Donglin Temple, Lushan, today, seen from a distance.

Tao Yuanming's birthplace was near Mountain Lu, which became a center of Buddhism and a source of origin for Pure Land Buddhism. According to historical accounts, in the 11th year of Emperor Xiaowu of Jin's Taiyuan reign period (386), when Tao Yuanming was 21 years old, Buddhist priest Huiyuan (later considered the First Ancestor of Pure Land Buddhism) came to build the Donglin Monastery and organized the White Lotus Society, or a branch thereof. Many scholars and poets participated in the Huiyuan's social circle, centered at the mountain monastery. According to Stories of Worthy Personages in the Lotus Society (蓮社高賢傳), Huiyuan never left the monastery, except for one time. The official border of the monastery was known as Tiger Creek (or Tiger Gorge), named for the tigers that inhabited the neighboring hills and over which spanned a bridge. Once, after Tao and another scholar visited, Huiyuan became so wrapped up in conversation with his guests while seeing them out that he did not notice he was leaving the monastery grounds. Upon crossing the Tiger Creek Bridge, the local tigers were so astonished at this departure from the Master's practice of never leaving the monastery grounds that they began to roar and howl. Once Huiyuan realized he had breached his practice, all three burst out laughing. This incident later became the subject of the paintings of "Three Laughing Men at Tiger Creek" (虎溪三笑; Pinyin: hǔ xī sān xiào).

=== Government service ===
Tao Yuanming did more than ten years of government service, personally involved with the sordid political scene of the times, which he did in five stints. Tao served in both civil and military capacities, making several trips down the Yangzi to the capital Jiankang, then a thriving metropolis and the center of power during the Six Dynasties. The ruins of the old Jiankang walls are in present-day Nanjing. During this period, Tao's poems begin to indicate that he was becoming torn between ambition and a desire to retreat into solitude.

==== Political background ====
Enough is known of the general state of affairs during Tao's governmental career to indicate why his service was so miserable for him: Tao served under the two usurpers Huan Xuan and Liu Yu, not to mention the weak Emperor An of Jin.

The future Emperor An (born 382 and personally named Sima Dezong) was a scion of the dynastic ruling family of the Jin empire, the Sima. His father was emperor Xiaowu, who named him crown prince in 387 despite his extreme developmental disabilities (he could not dress himself, speak, or generally communicate). When Xiaowu was murdered in bed by his secondary wife, the Lady Zhang, An was crowned emperor in 397. Acting as regent, actual control of the empire was in the hands of An's father's younger brother Sima Daozi, who could dress himself and communicate verbally, but nevertheless was not that capable a ruler, with a reputation for feasting and drinking rather than attending to affairs of state, and surrounding himself with flatterers. Various insurrections developed during the span of this corrupt and incompetent government, mostly unsuccessful, a state of affairs that did not change much when Sima Daozi's son Sima Yuanxian succeeded as regent (which reportedly happened while Sima Daozi was drunk). Eventually the warlord Huan Xuan consolidated enough power to seize the regency for himself. Huan Xuan was a kleptocrat, who found ways to seize valuable objects or properties he envied. He also had a habit of tyrannically punishing any official who made the slightest mistake or whom he was suspicious of. In 403, Huan had Emperor An abdicate so that he himself could be ruler both in fact and in name, and renamed his empire the Chu dynasty. Shortly thereafter Huan was killed an uprising, in 404/405. The rebels then restored An as emperor and the empire's name to Jin. The rebels' leader was Huan's general Liu Yu, who ruled as regent for Emperor An. A typical pattern of external warfare and rebellions from within followed. In 418/419 Liu had an assassin kill An. Liu installed An's younger brother Sima Dewen as Emperor Gong of Jin, with Liu retaining the real power. Liu then forced Gong to abdicate, and not long after had him assassinated. Upon Gong's abdication, Liu had himself named Emperor Wu of Song, officially ending the Jin dynasty. This is the government in which Tao Yuanming served, and his poems portray his increasing discontent with doing so. Whether he was really inclined to do so is less clear (and he seems to have family reasons for his decision to resign). Nevertheless, after around a decade of service, Tao left the government and returned to his home region.

==== Five stints as a government official ====
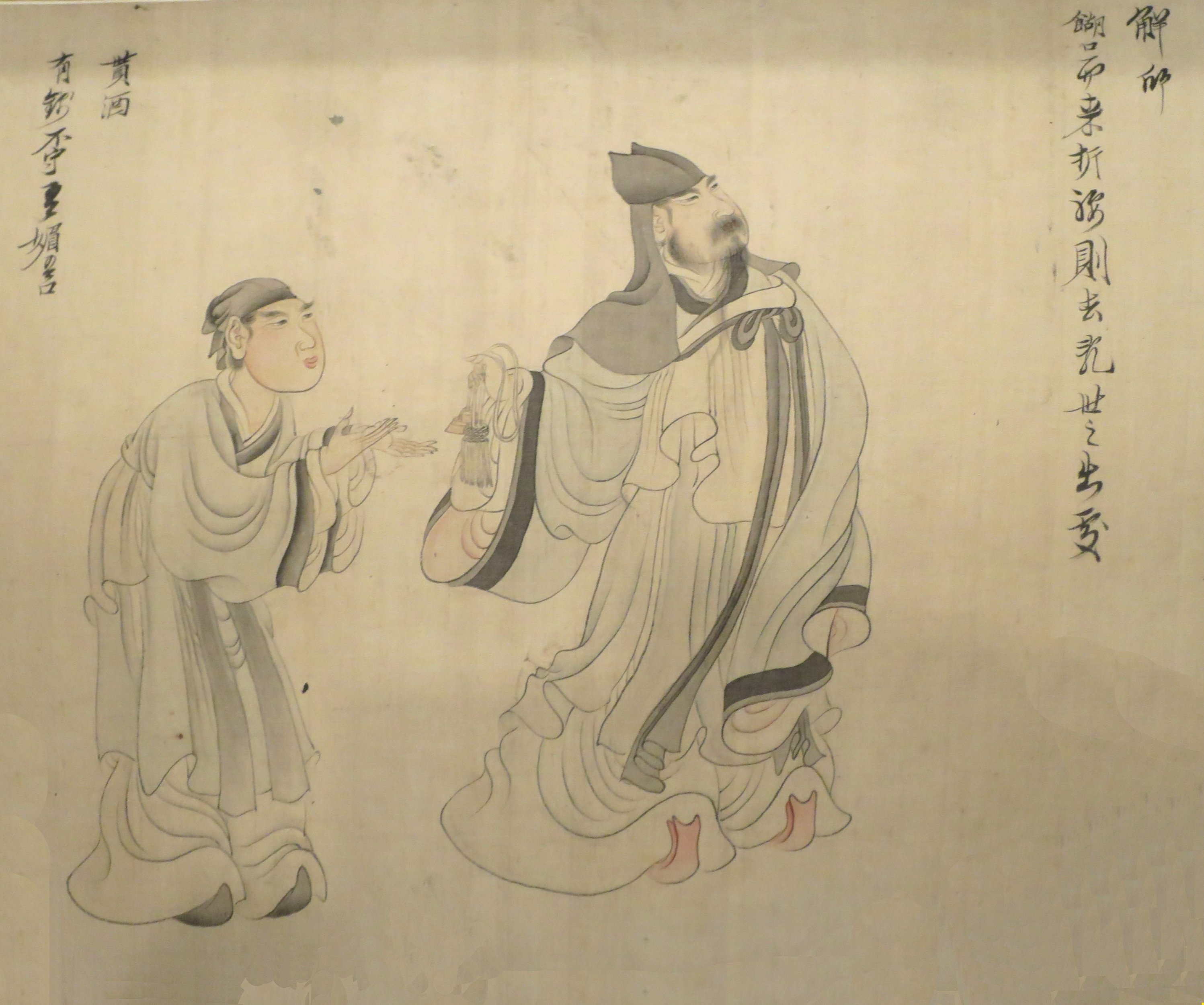
"Renouncing the Official Seal" from the hand scroll Scenes from the Life of Tao Yuanming by Chen Hongshou (1598–1652), Qing dynasty, dated 1650, ink and color on silk, Honolulu Museum of Art

Tao Yuanming's first stint in government was as State Officer of Rites, when he was about twenty-nine. He did this in part due to family poverty, and to support his aged parents. However, he had a difficult time of it and returned home. Accounts of Tao's second and third government service stints vary somewhat. One source of information is A Year-by-Year Biography of Tao Yuanming by Lu Qingli. Tao's second stint in government seems to have been working for Huan Xuan. According to Lu, Tao served in the government during the Long'an years of emperor An, during the time of the Sun En revolt. (Sun En seems to have been a populist magician associated with the Way of the Five Pecks of Rice movement.) Tao would have been about thirty-five years old, and the warlord Huan Xuan had become governor of Tao's home province, Jiangzhou. Huan had a plan to coordinate with other warlords (including Liu Yu) to eradicate Sun En. Again according to Lu, Tao Yuanming was the official to go to the imperial capital, Jiankang, and officially submit this proposal to the imperial government. After receiving approval, Huan and associates successfully subdued the rebellion. Then, about three years later, Huan Xuan and other warlords rebelled, and captured both the capital city and the emperor, An, and thus the imperial power. But by this time Tao Yuanming was working not for Huan but as Defense Strategist (apparently his third stint as a government official), handling paperwork for Liu Yu, the general in charge of defending the Sima-lead imperial government. There was also a fourth stint. When he was about forty, Tao worked for general Liu Jingxuan, who resigned about a year later, and Tao along with him. Tao Yuanming's fifth and final stint, as Penze county magistrate (beginning March of the first year of the Yixing regnal year), only lasted about eighty days, as he resigned in August the same year. This was the time period when he wrote his essay "To Return", in his preface to which he mentions taking the job because having "a house full of little kids", and goes on to explain why he wants to give up government work and return home. Each stint seems to have lasted no more than a few years, and each time Tao Yuanming seems to have resigned and returned home. Officially, his retirement was due to the sudden death of his younger sister and his need to attend to the funeral rites. Another reason, given by his biographer Xiao Tong, was that Tao was faced with the imminent imposition of an onerous supervisor, whom he was told he "had to treat right", and which was the occasion of him saying, "I won't bow to a bucolic boy for the sake of five pecks of rice." Subsequently, despite various offers by Liu Yu, after he became emperor, Tao Yuanming refused to return to government service. Of Tao Yuanming's career Su Shi describe him as "working for the government when he desired to, without feeling shame in his requests; retiring when he desired to, without thinking himself lofty."

=== Return to the fields ===
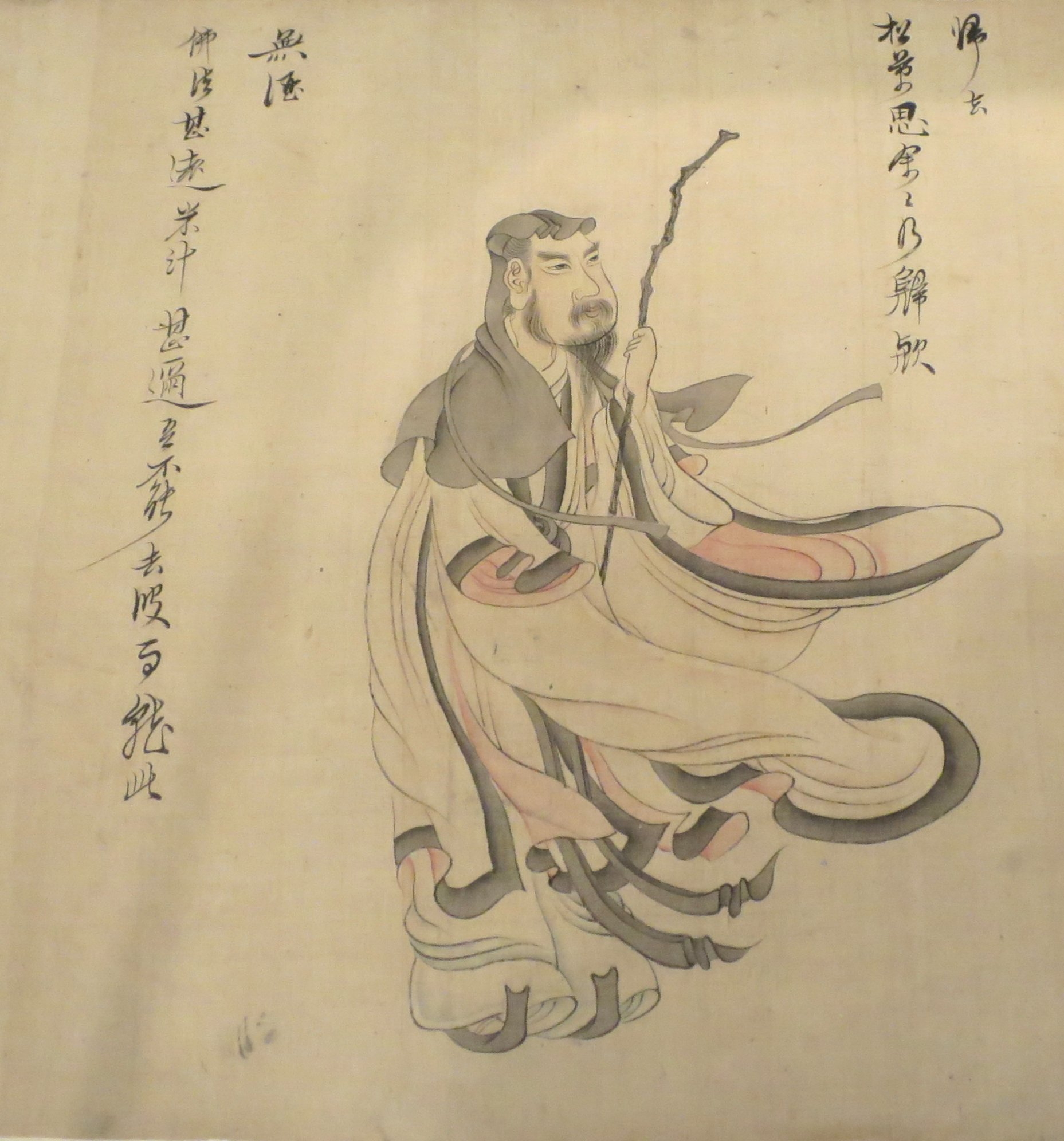
"Returning Home" from the hand scroll Scenes from the Life of Tao Yuanming by Chen Hongshou, Qing dynasty, dated 1650, ink and color on silk, Honolulu Museum of Art

In the Spring of 405, Tao Yuanming was serving in the army, as aide-de-camp to the local commanding officer. The death of his sister together with his disgust at the corruption and infighting of the Jin Court prompted him to resign. As Tao himself put it, he would not "bow like a servant in return for five pecks of grain" (為五斗米折腰), a saying which has entered common usage meaning "swallowing one's pride in exchange for a meager existence". "Five pecks of grain" was among other things the specified salary of certain low-rank officials. Certainly Tao Yuanming's salary as Penze County Magistrate was far higher than five pecks, so this was a symbolic expression. For the last 22 years of his life, he lived in retirement on his small farmstead.

=== Children and family ===
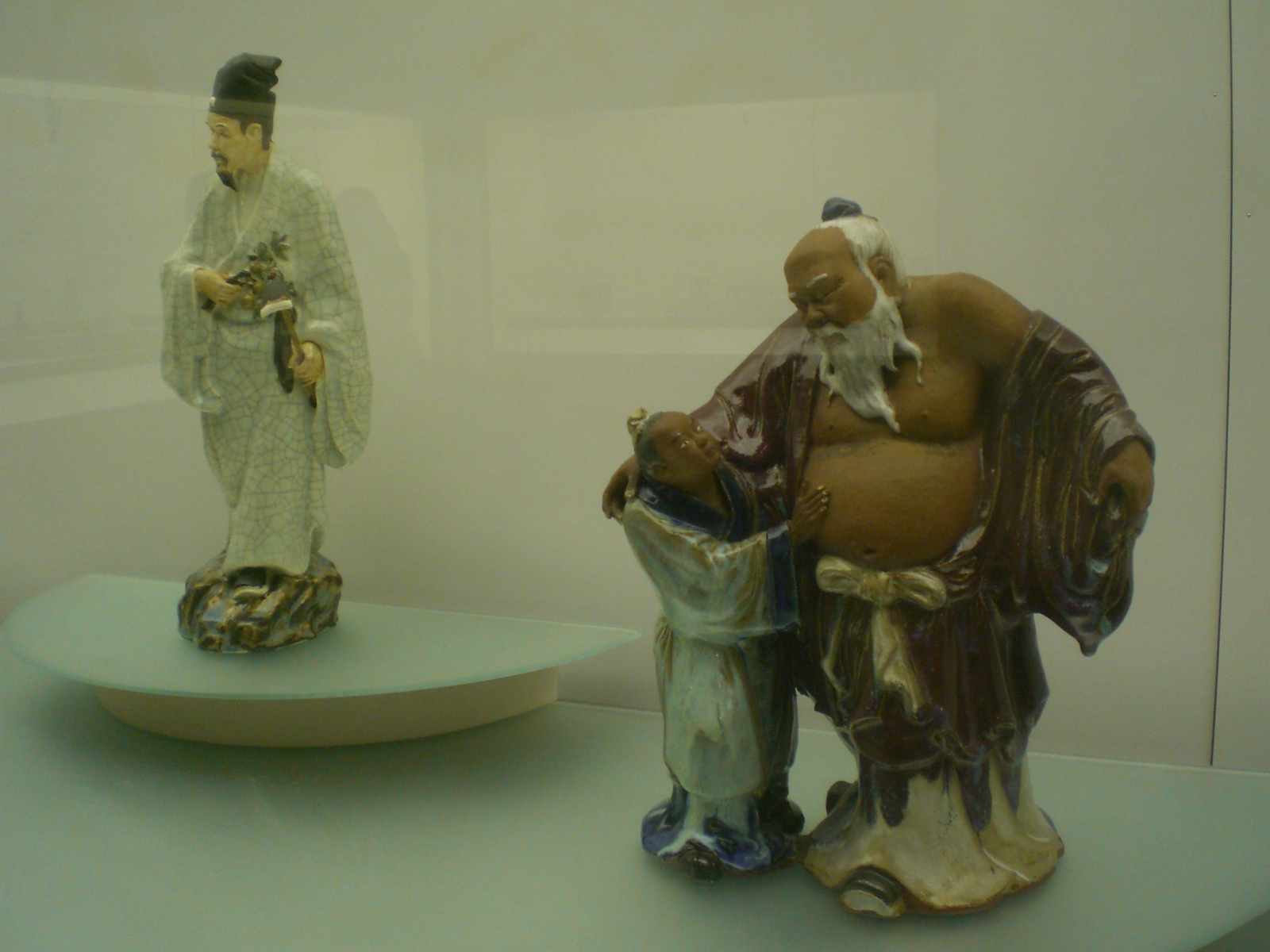
Statue of Tao Yuanming holding son, Hong Kong Museum of Art

Tao Yuanming married two times. His first wife died when he was in his thirties.

Tao Yuanming had five sons. The oldest son was Tao Yan, as mentioned in his letter "A Letter to My Sons Yan, Etc.", a sort of apology for any hunger or cold which they suffered as a result of following his ideal and conscience and not working for the government anymore. The daughters, if any, were unrecorded (as customary). However, just how this occurred within the chronology of his life is unknown.

=== Religious and philosophical influences ===
Tao Yuanming's works show a certain spiritual side to them. The three main sources of religious/philosophical influence on Tao Yuanming were Confucian, Buddhist, and Taoist.

In his youth, Tao says, "I enjoyed studying the Six Classics." He mentions this in Title 16 of his Drinking Poems series. The Six Classics refers to the fundamental Confucian texts now known as the Five Classics, due to the loss of the Book of Music). Tao shows his Taoist influence in various works; for example, through such lines as "I long to return to Nature" from his poem "Returning to Country and Farming", or his sentiments in his essay "Return". In these texts, Tao deprecates artificial limits or restrictions in interpersonal relationships, instead expressing the desire for a simple life, with nature taking its course. Also in "Returning to Country and Farming", Tao Yuanming shows a Buddhist side (although he never formally became a Buddhist): "Life is like an illusion; everything returns to emptiness," he says, echoing the Buddhist sutras. His ability to absorb and creatively employ the three diverse religions/philosophies leads Florence Chia-ying Yeh to say: "Among the Chinese poets, Tao Yuanming had the greatest perseverance and integrity. His power to persevere was based upon his acceptance and absorption of the essentials of various philosophies, such as Confucianism, Taoism, and Buddhism. He mastered not only the external words, doctrines, and rituals, but also had a thorough internal understanding and acceptance of the best and most valuable parts of those schools of thought."

=== Death ===
His main biographies give Tao Yuanming's death as "in the fourth year of the Yuanjia reign period of Emperor Wen". Thus, Tao Qian is generally but not universally held to have died in 427, which mathematically works out to the age of 63. If, however, he was in fact born in 352, he would instead have been 76 years old when he died.

== Sources ==
There are various sources with information about Tao Yuanming. Among the Twenty-Four Histories, his first biography was recorded in the Book of Song (vol 93; compiled late 5th century) by Shen Yue. Tao Yuanming also had biographies in the Book of Jin (vol.94) and History of the Southern Dynasties (vol.75); both works were compiled during the Tang dynasty. There is also some information to be found in his preserved works, which were first systematically collected by Xiao Tong, a Liang dynasty prince (posthumously known as Crown Prince Zhaoming), who also included a biography in his book Wen Xuan.

== Works and legacy ==
Approximately 130 of his works survive, consisting mostly of poems or essays which depict an idyllic pastoral life of farming and drinking.

=== Poetry ===
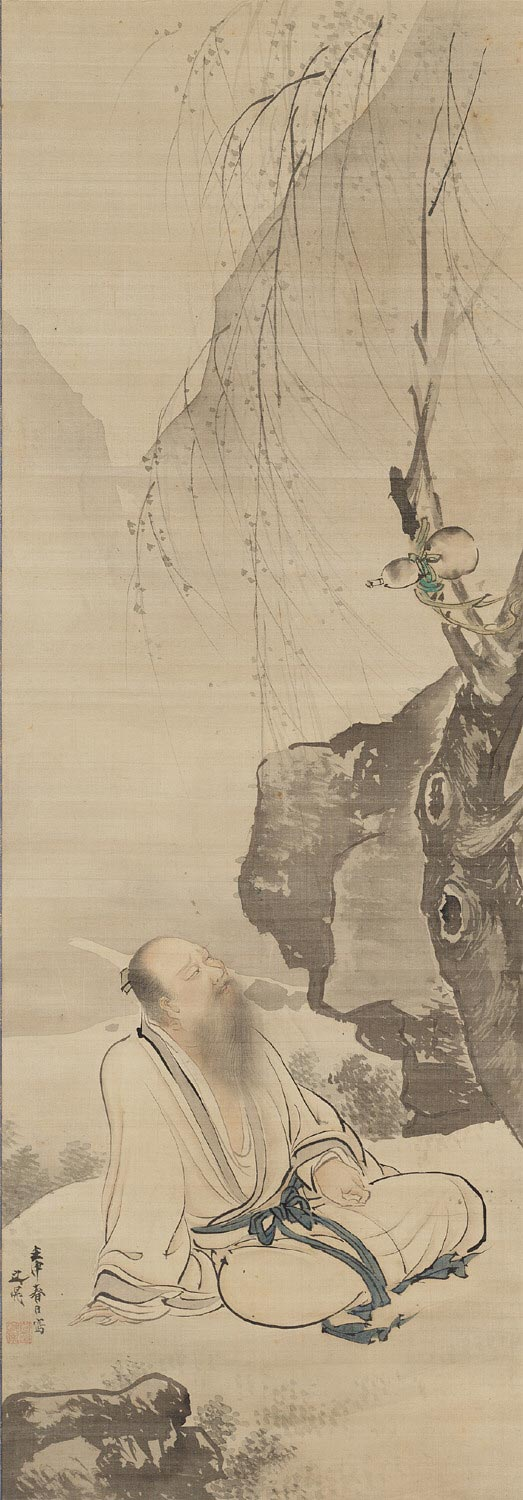
Tao Yuanming Seated Under a Willow. Tani Bunchō, Japan, 1812

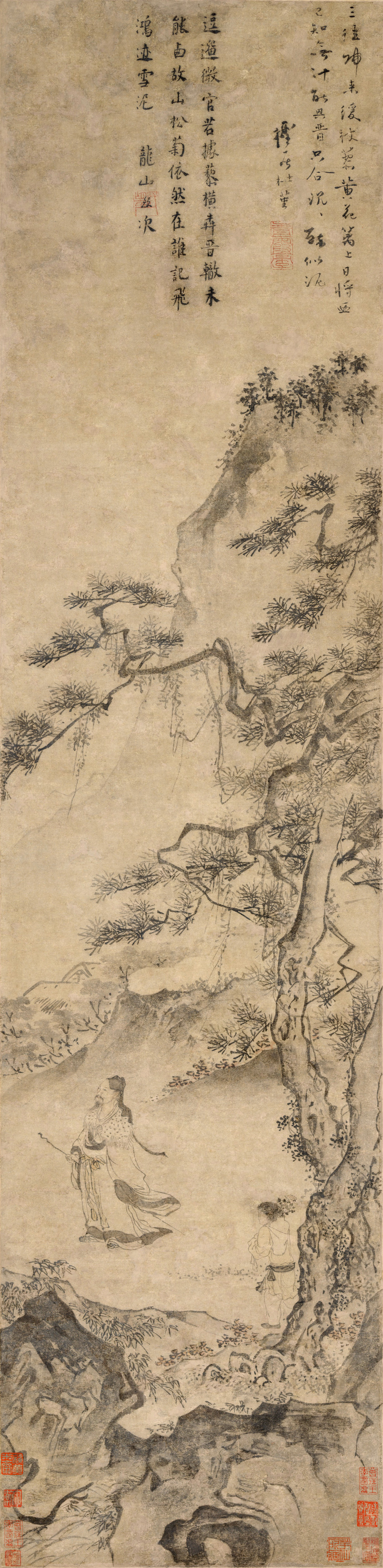
Tao Yuanming Enjoying Chrysanthemums, by Du Jin, Ming dynasty.

Because his poems depict a life of farming and of drinking his homemade wine, he would later be termed "Poet of the Fields". In Tao Yuanming's poems can be found superlative examples of the theme which urges its audience to drop out of official life, move to the country, and take up a cultivated life of wine, poetry, and avoiding people with whom friendship would be unsuitable, but in Tao's case this went along with actually engaging in farming. Tao's poetry also shows an inclination to fulfillment of duty, such as feeding his family. Tao's simple and plain style of expression, reflecting his back-to-basics lifestyle, first became better known as he achieved local fame as a hermit. This was followed gradually by recognition in major anthologies. By the Tang dynasty, Tao was elevated to greatness as a poet's poet, revered by Li Bai and Du Fu.

Han poetry, Jian'an poetry, the Seven Sages of the Bamboo Grove, and the other earlier Six dynasties poetry foreshadowed some of Tao's particular symbolism and the general "returning home to the country" theme, and also somewhat separately show precursory in evolving of poetic form, based on the yuefu style which traces its origin to the Han dynasty Music Bureau. An example given of the thematic evolution of one of Tao's poetic themes is Zhang Heng's Return to the Field, written in the Classical Chinese poetry form known as the fu, or "rhapsody" style, but Tao's own poetry (including his own "Return to the Field" poem) tends to be known for its use of the more purely poetic shi which developed as a regular line length form from the literary yuefu of the Jian'an and foreshadows the verse forms favored in Tang poetry, such as gushi, or "old-style verse". Tao's poems, prose and their combination of form and theme into his own style broke new ground and became a fondly relied upon historical landmark. Much subsequent Chinese painting and literature would require no more than the mention or image of chrysanthemums by the eastern fence to call to mind Tao Yuanming's life and poetry. Later, his poetry and the particular motifs which Tao Yuanming exemplified would prove to importantly influence the innovations of Beat poetry and the 1960s poetry of the United States and Europe. Both in the 20th century and subsequently, Tao Yuanming has come to occupy a position as one of the select group of great world poets.

==== Poems ====
The following is an extract from a poem Tao wrote, in the year 409, in regard to a traditional Chinese holiday:

Written on the Ninth Day of the Ninth Month of the Year yi-yu

The myriad transformations
unravel one another
And human life
how should it not be hard?
From ancient times
there was none but had to die,
Remembering this
scorches my very heart.
What is there I can do
to assuage this mood?
Only enjoy myself
drinking my unstrained wine.
I do not know
about a thousand years,
Rather let me make
this morning last forever.

Poem number five of Tao's "Drinking Wine" series is translated by Arthur Waley:

I built my hut in a zone of human habitation

I built my hut in a zone of human habitation,
Yet near me there sounds no noise of horse or coach.
Would you know how that is possible?
A heart that is distant creates a wilderness round it.
I pluck chrysanthemums under the eastern hedge,
Then gaze long at the distant summer hills.
The mountain air is fresh at the dusk of day:
The flying birds two by two return.
In these things there lies a deep meaning;
Yet when we would express it, words suddenly fail us.

Another, from the same source is "Returning to the Fields" (alternatively translated by others as "Return to the Field"):

When I was young, I was out of tune with the herd:
My only love was for the hills and mountains.
Unwitting I fell into the Web of the World's dust
And was not free until my thirtieth year.
The migrant bird longs for the old wood:
The fish in the tank thinks of its native pool.
I had rescued from wildness a patch of the Southern Moor
And, still rustic, I returned to field and garden.
My ground covers no more than ten acres:
My thatched cottage has eight or nine rooms.
Elms and willows cluster by the eaves:
Peach trees and plum trees grow before the hall.
Hazy, hazy the distant hamlets of men.
Steady the smoke of the half-deserted village,
A dog barks somewhere in the deep lanes,
A cock crows at the top of the mulberry tree.
At gate and courtyard—no murmur of the World's dust:
In the empty rooms—leisure and deep stillness.
Long I lived checked by the bars of a cage:
Now I have turned again to Nature and Freedom.

Tao's poems greatly influenced the ensuing poetry of the Tang and Song Dynasties. A great admirer of Tao, Du Fu wrote a poem Oh, Such a Shame of life in the countryside:

Only by wine one's heart is lit,
only a poem calms a soul that's torn.
You'd understand me, Tao Qian.
I wish a little sooner I was born!

=== Peach Blossom Spring ===
Aside from his poems, Tao is also known for his short, influential, and intriguing prose depiction of a land hidden from the outside world called "Peach Blossom Spring" (桃花源記). The name Peach Blossom Spring (桃花源, Tao Hua Yuan) is now a well known, standard Chinese term for a utopia. This fable recounted by Tao Yuanming begins with a claim that it occurred in the Taiyuan era of the Jin dynasty (376–396). According to the story, a fisher gets lost and discovers a place out of time, but cannot find it again after he leaves and tells of its existence. It is a very influential story.

=== Legacy ===
Tao Yuanming's literary legacy also includes his influence on later poets and authors. One example is Song dynasty poet Xin Qiji. Another example is Su Shi's composition "Matching Tao's Poems", in which the Song dynasty poet wrote a new poem in response to Tao's poems, but used the same rhymes for his lines. Another poet inspired in part by Tao Yuanming was the 16th century Korean poet Yi Hwang.

== Critical appraisal ==
Zhong Rong (468–518) described Yuanming's literary style as "spare and limpid, with scarcely a surplus word." In Poetry Gradings (詩品) Zhong Rong wrote:

[Yuanming's] sincerity is true and traditional, his verbalized inspirations supple and relaxed. When one reads his works, the fine character of the poet himself comes to mind. Ordinary men admire his unadorned directness. But such lines of his as "With happy face I pour the spring-brewed wine," and "The sun sets, no clouds are in the sky," are pure and refined in the beauty of their air. These are far from being merely the words of a farmer. He is the father of recluse poetry past and present.

Su Shi (1037–1101), one of the major poets of the Song era, said that the only poet he was particularly fond of was Yuanming, who "deeply impressed [him] by what he was as a man." Su Shi exalted Yuanming's "unadorned and yet beautiful, spare and yet ample" poems, and even asserted that "neither Cao Zhi, Liu Zhen, Bao Zhao, Xie Lingyun, Li Bai, nor Du Fu achieves his stature".

Huang Tingjian (1045–1105), one of the Four Masters of the Song dynasty and a younger friend of Su Shi, said, "“When you’ve just come of age, reading these poems seems like gnawing on withered wood. But reading them after long experience in the world, it seems the decisions of your life were all made in ignorance.”

Lin Yutang (1895–1976) considered Yuanming the perfect example of "the true lover of life". He praised the harmony and simplicity in Yuanming's life as well as in his style, and claimed that he "represents the most perfectly harmonious and well-rounded character in the entire Chinese literary tradition."

In Great lives from history (1988), Frank Northen Magill highlights the "candid beauty" of Yuanming's poetry, stating that the "freshness of his images, his homespun but Heaven-aspiring morality, and his steadfast love of rural life shine through the deceptively humble words in which they are expressed, and as a consequence he has long been regarded one of China's most accomplished and accessible poets." He also discusses what makes Yuanming unique as a poet, and why his works were perhaps overlooked by his contemporaries:

It is this fundamental love of simplicity that distinguishes T'ao Ch'ien's verses from the works of court poets of his time, who utilized obscure allusions and complicated stylistic devices to fashion verses that appealed only to the highly educated. T'ao Ch'ien, by way of contrast, seldom made any literary allusions whatsoever, and he wrote for the widest possible audience. As a consequence, he was slighted by his era's critics and only fully appreciated by later generations of readers.

== Gallery ==
Tao Yuanming has inspired not only generations of poets, but also painters and other artists.

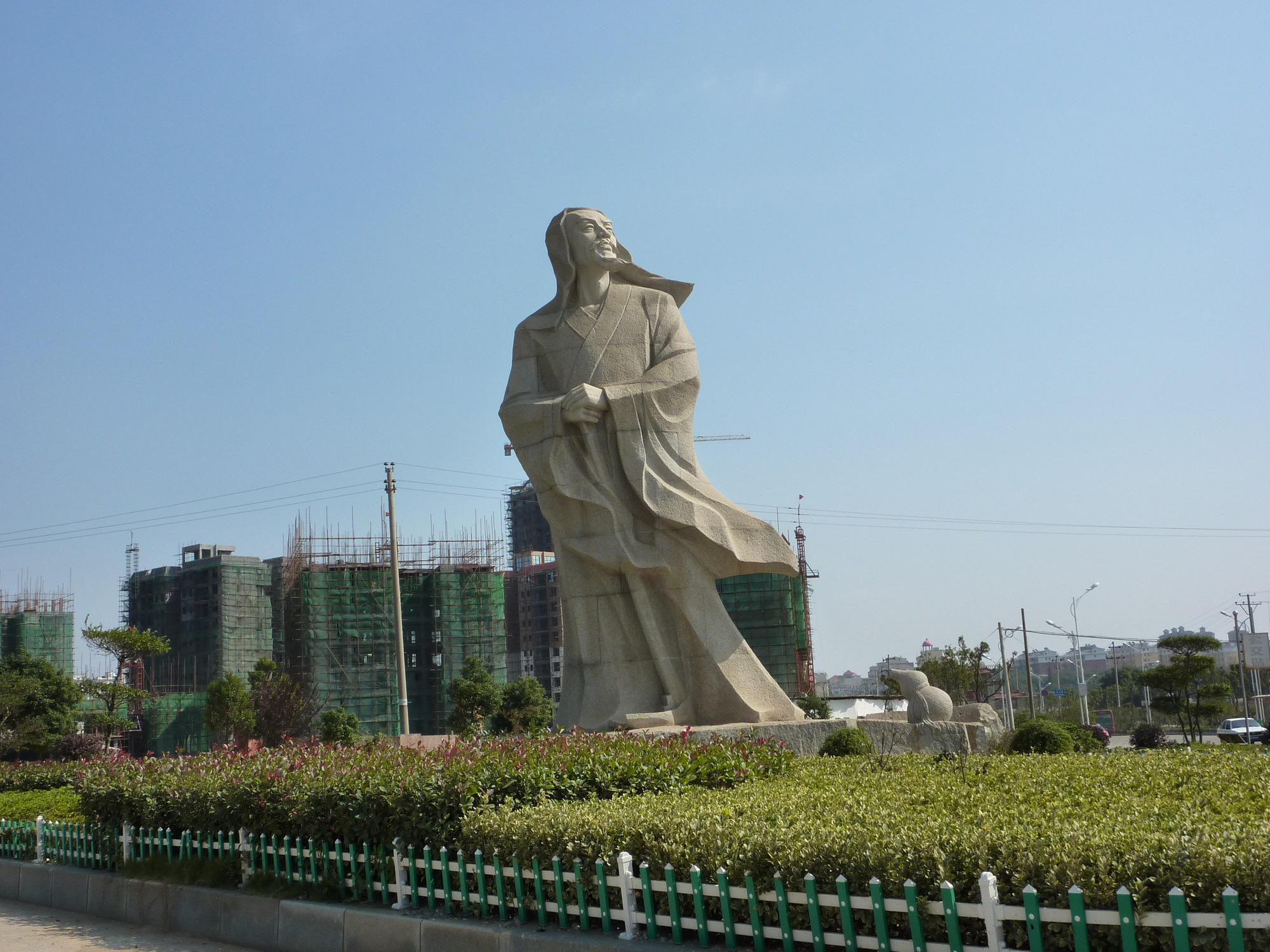
Tao Yuanming statue in his hometown (柴桑) (modern Jiujiang, Jiangxi)

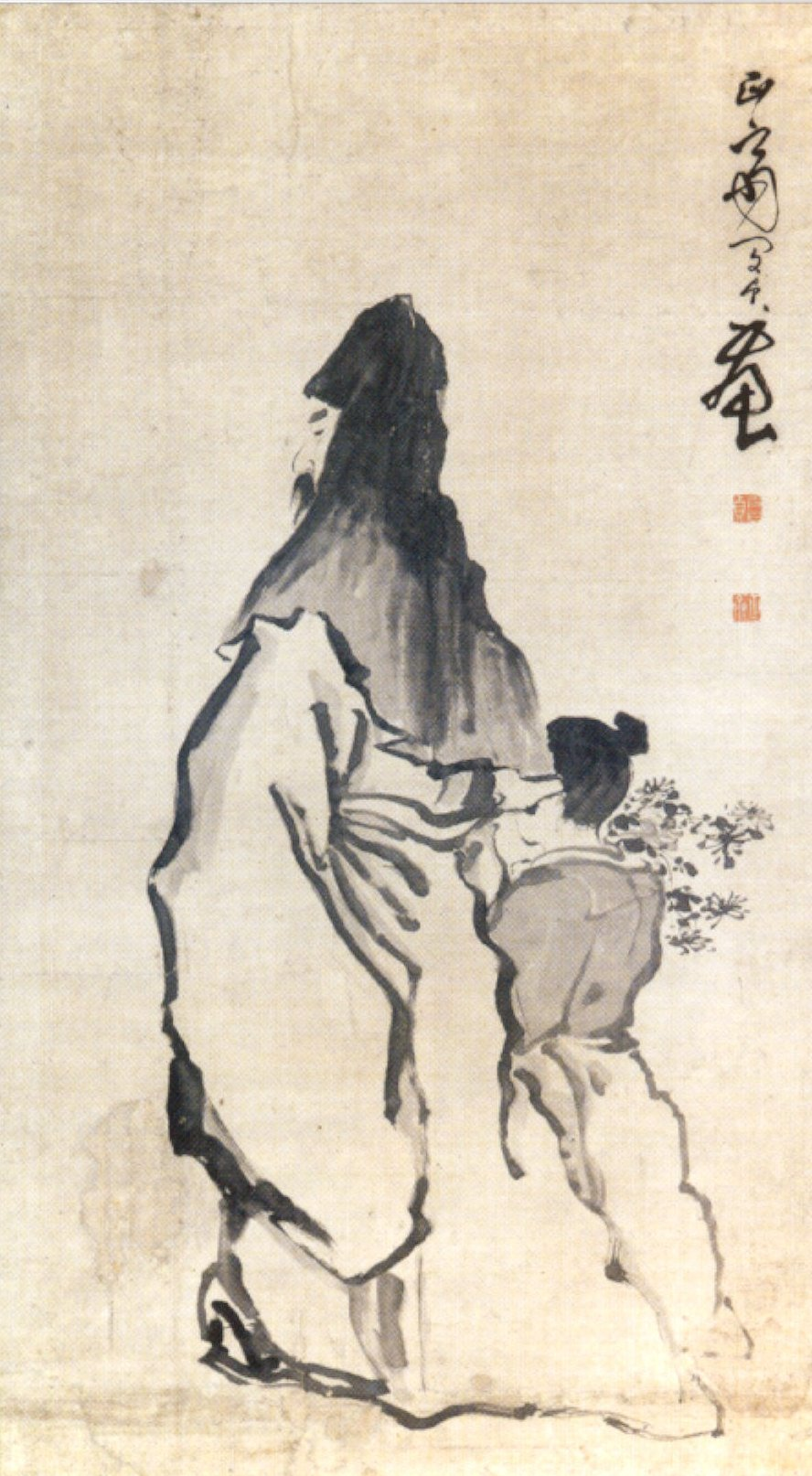
Tao Yuanming by Min Zhen, 18th century.

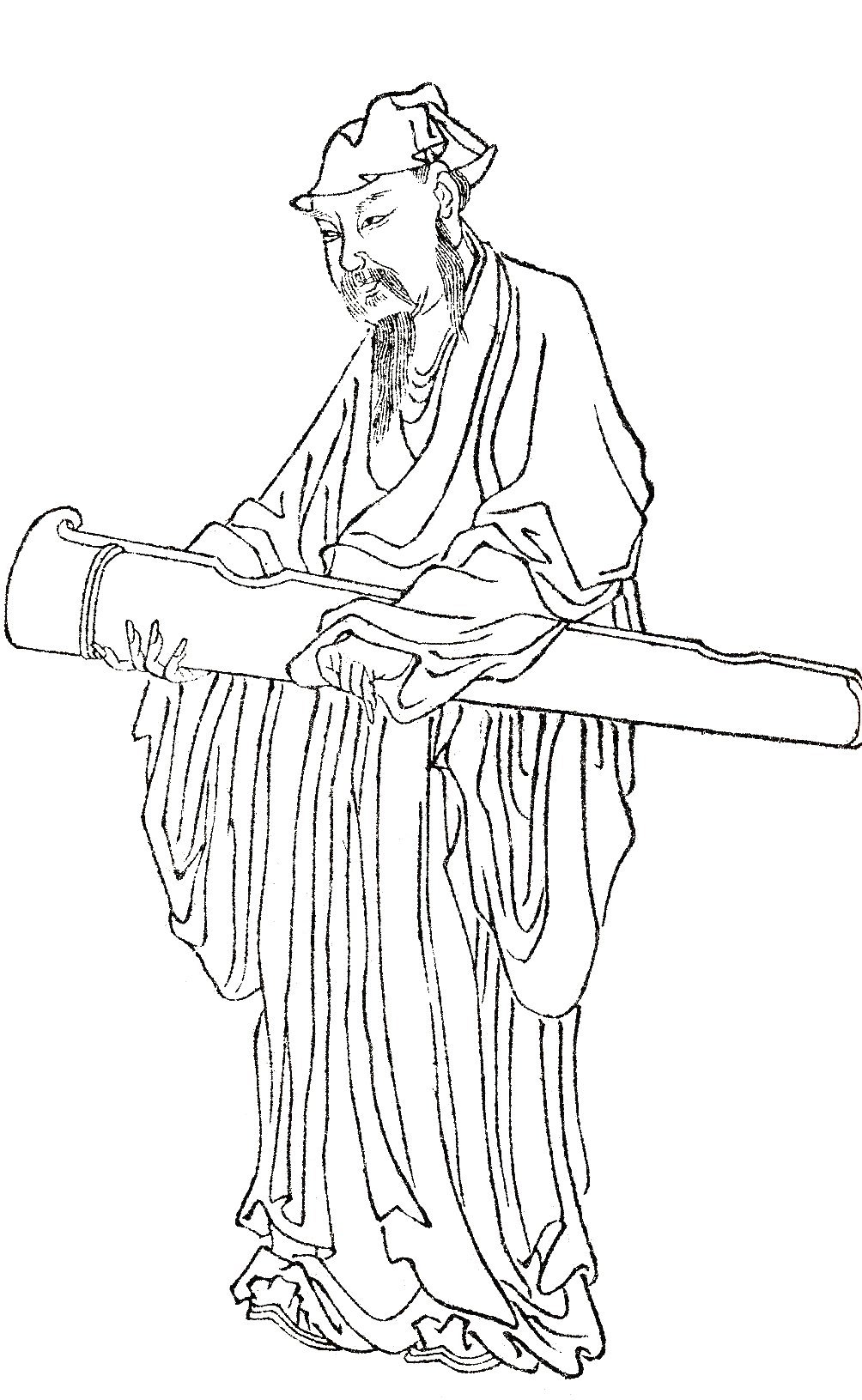
From the book Wan hsiao tang-Chu chuang -Hua chuan (晩笑堂竹荘畫傳), published in 1921 (民国十年).

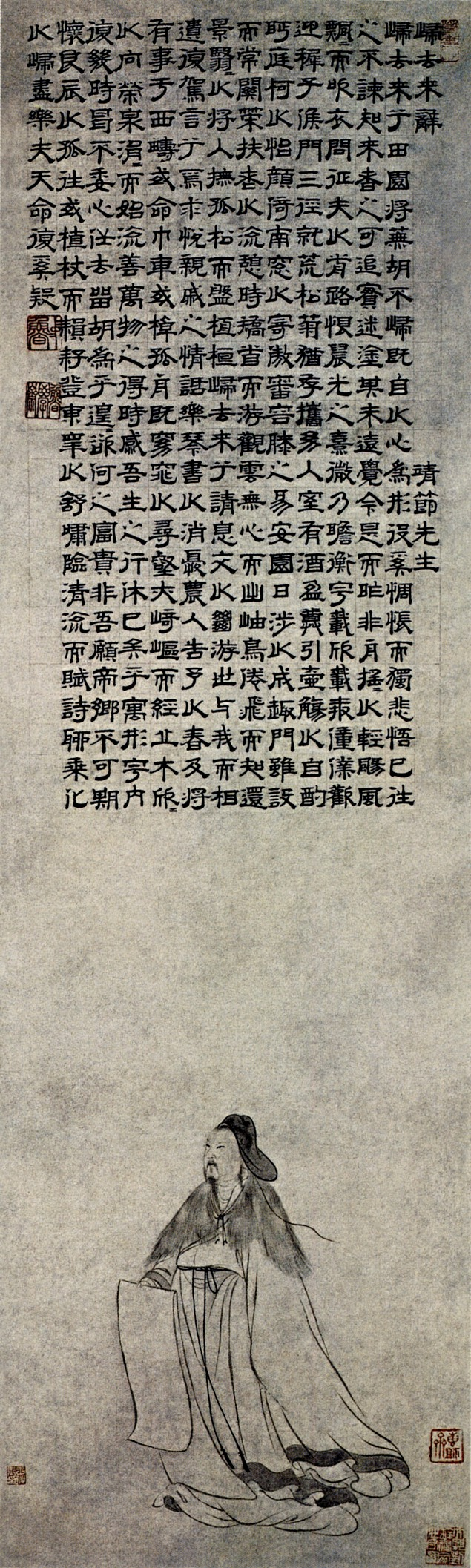
Master Jingjie, hanging scroll, ink on paper, 106.8 x 32.5 cm. Located at the Palace Museum, Beijing. Jing Jie is the posthumous name for Tao Qian, the poet from the Jin dynasty. The text at the top is from the Ci style poem 歸去來兮.

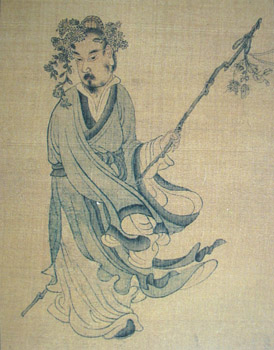
Portrait of Tao Qian by Chen Hongshou (1599–1652)

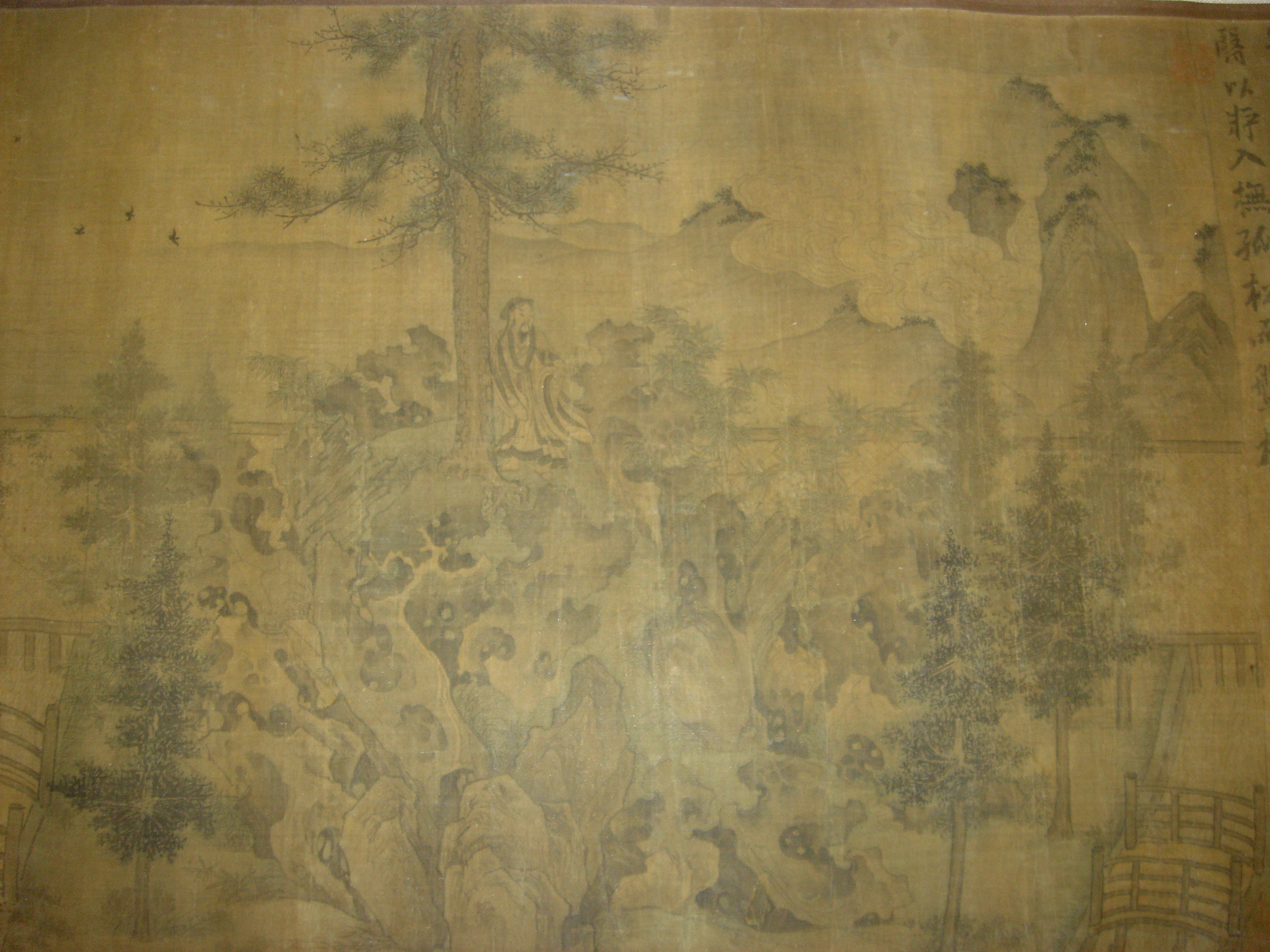
A Song dynasty painting on silk portraying Tao's return to seclusion in the mountains, early 12th century. Li Peng (c. 1060–1110) inscribed a poem on this handscroll entitled Returning Home in honor of Tao Qian, otherwise known as Tao Yuanming.

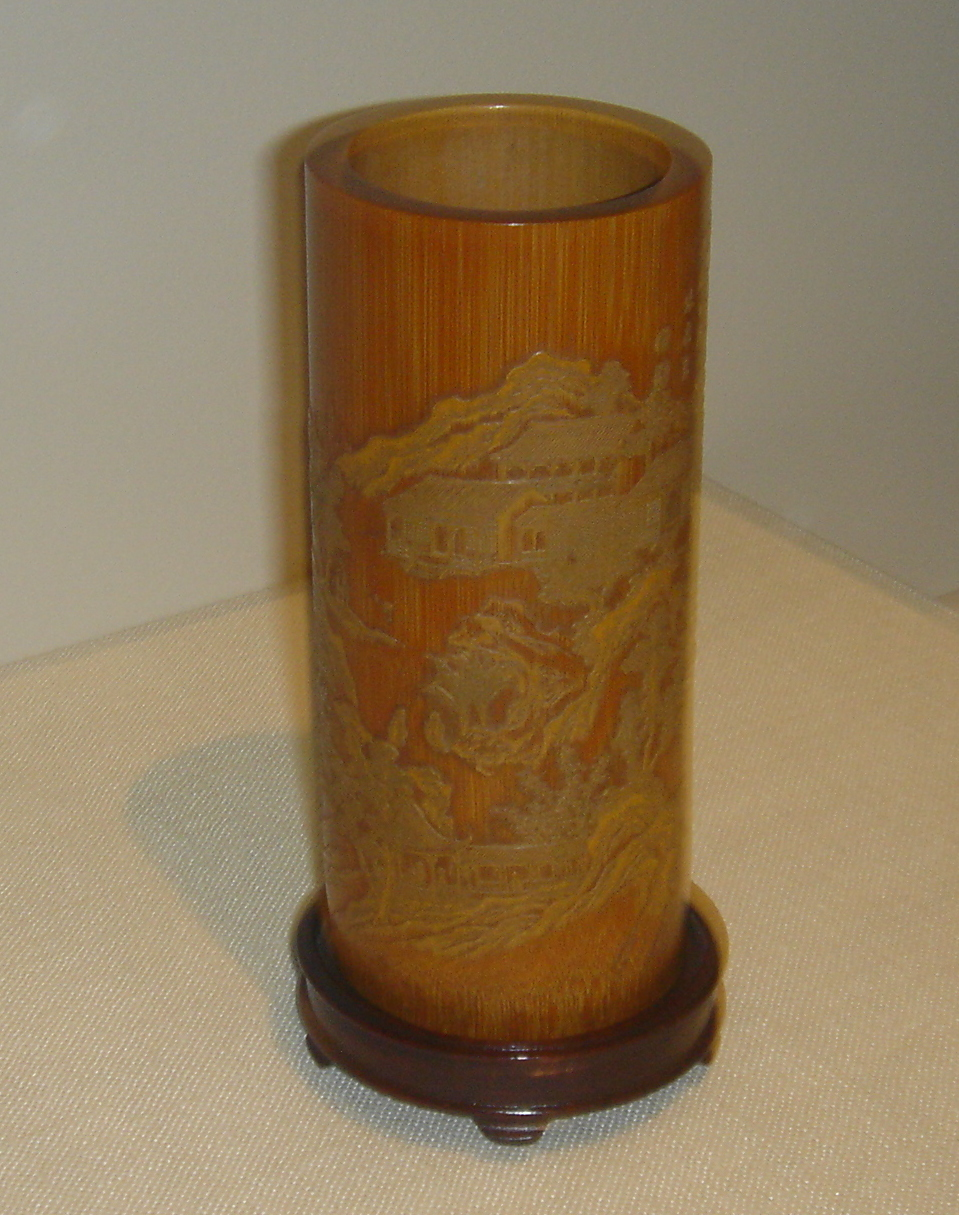
A bamboo brush holder or holder of poems on scrolls, created by Zhang Xihuang in the 17th century, late Ming or early Qing dynasty. In fanciful Chinese calligraphy in Zhang's style, the poem Returning to My Farm in the Field by the 4th century poet Tao Yuanming is incised on this cylindrical bamboo holder.

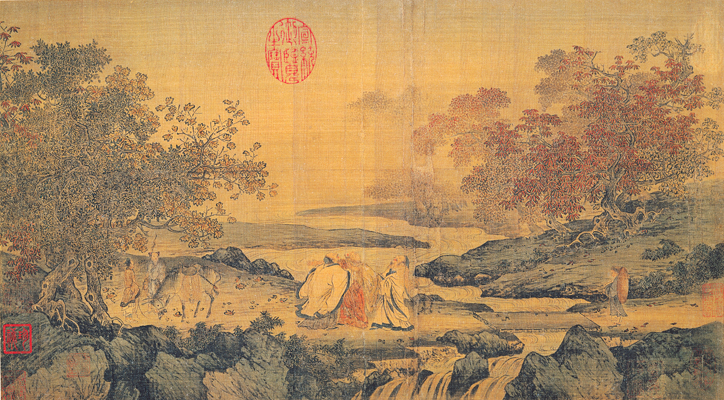
Song dynasty painting in the Litang style illustrating the theme "Confucianism, Taoism and Buddhism are one". Depicts Taoist Lu Xiujing (left), official Tao Yuanming (right) and Buddhist monk Huiyuan (center, founder of Pure Land) by the Tiger stream. The stream borders a zone infested by tigers that they just crossed without fear, engrossed as they were in their discussion. Realising what they just did, they laugh together, hence the name of the picture, Three laughing men by the Tiger stream.

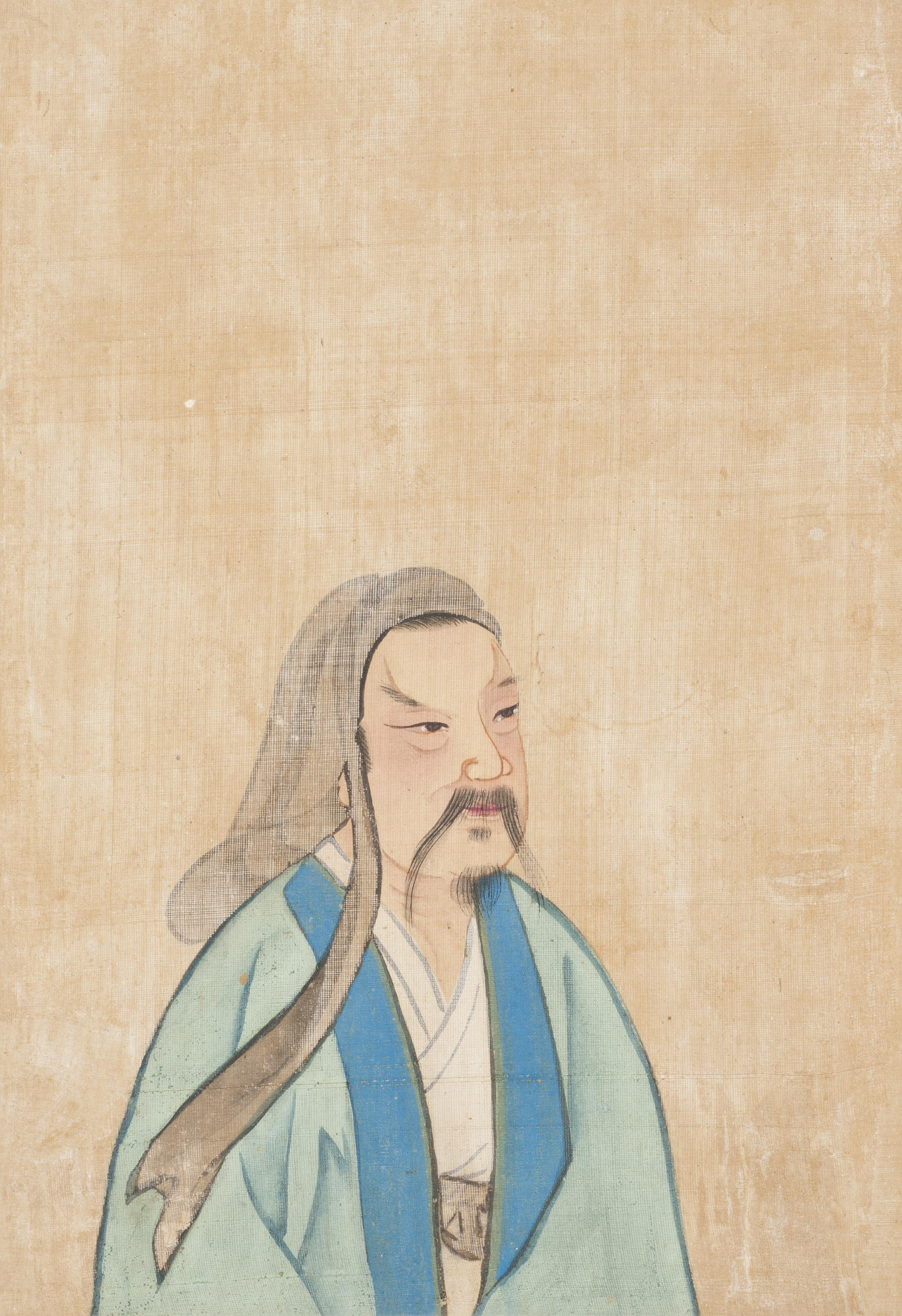
As depicted in the album Portraits of Famous Men c. 1900, housed in the Philadelphia Museum of Art

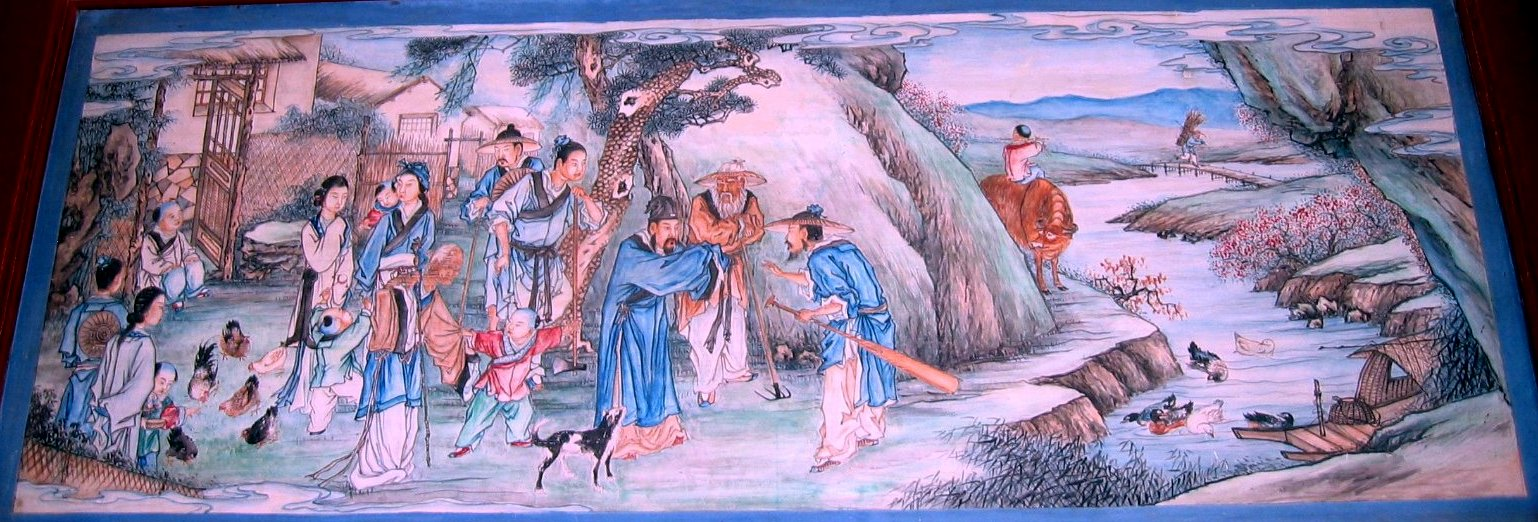
The Tale of the Peach-Blossom Land inside of the Long Corridor.

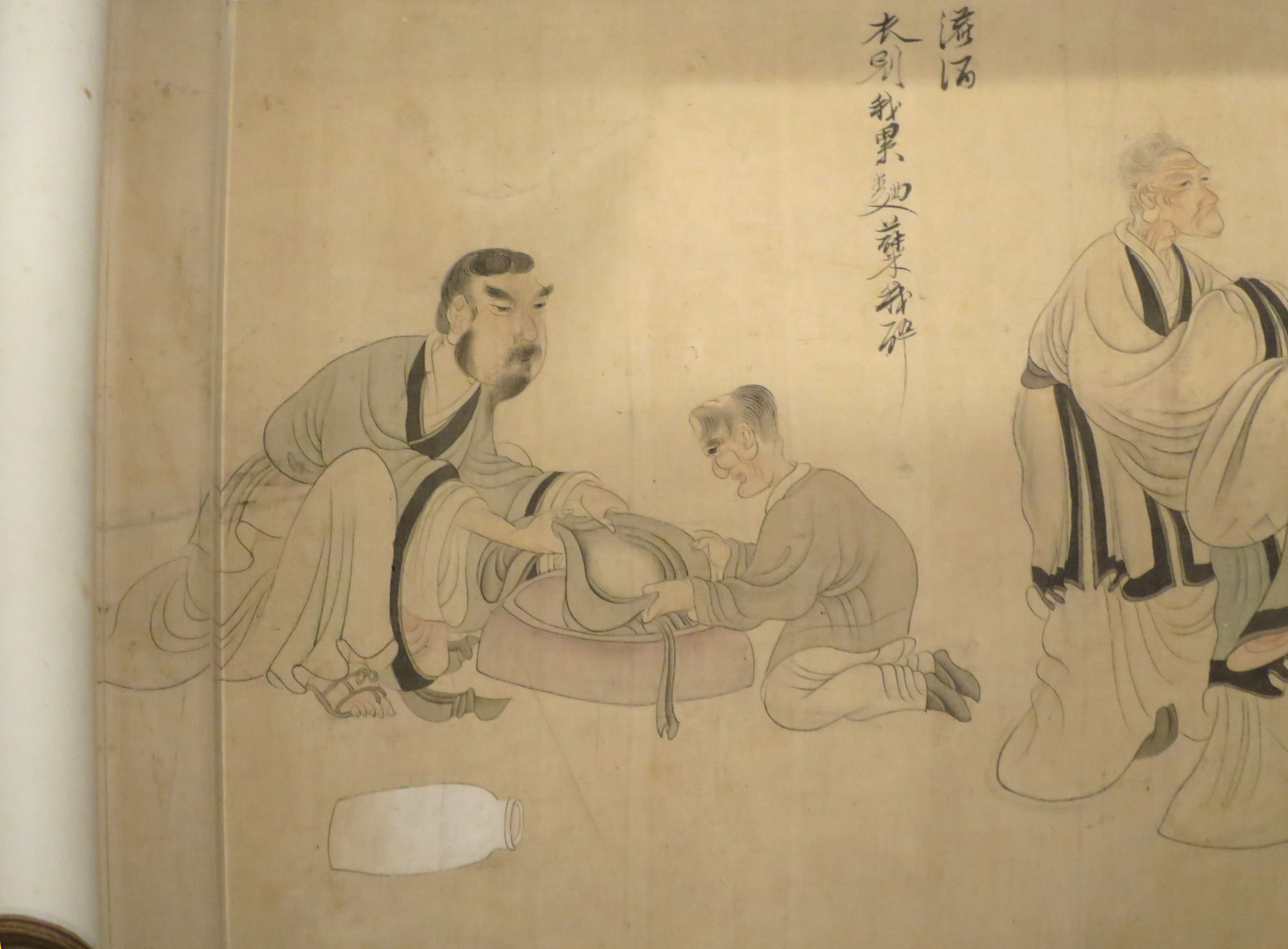
Filling Wine from 'Scenes from the Life of Tao Yuanming' by Chen Hongshou

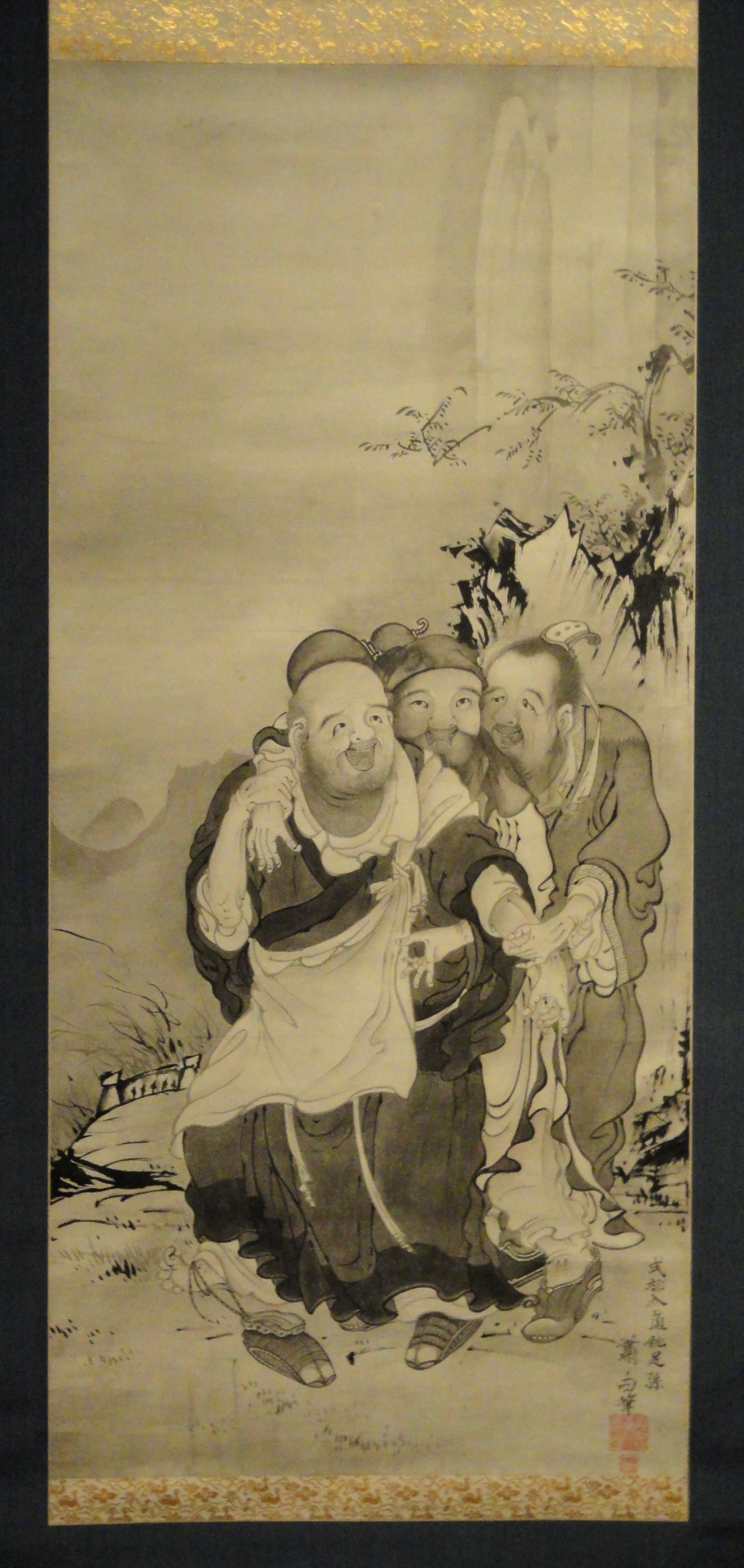
The "Three Laughers of Tiger Ravine", by Soga Shohaku (1730–1781). Depicts Huiyuan (Chinese 慧遠; Hui-Yuan, Hui-Yüan in Mandarin or Fi-Yon in Gan) (334–416 AD); Tao Qian (simplified Chinese: 陶潜; traditional Chinese: 陶潛; pinyin: Táo Qián; Wade–Giles: T'ao Ch'ien) (365–427); and Lu Xiujing (chin. 陸修靜, W.-G. Liu Hsiu-ching; born 406; died 477).

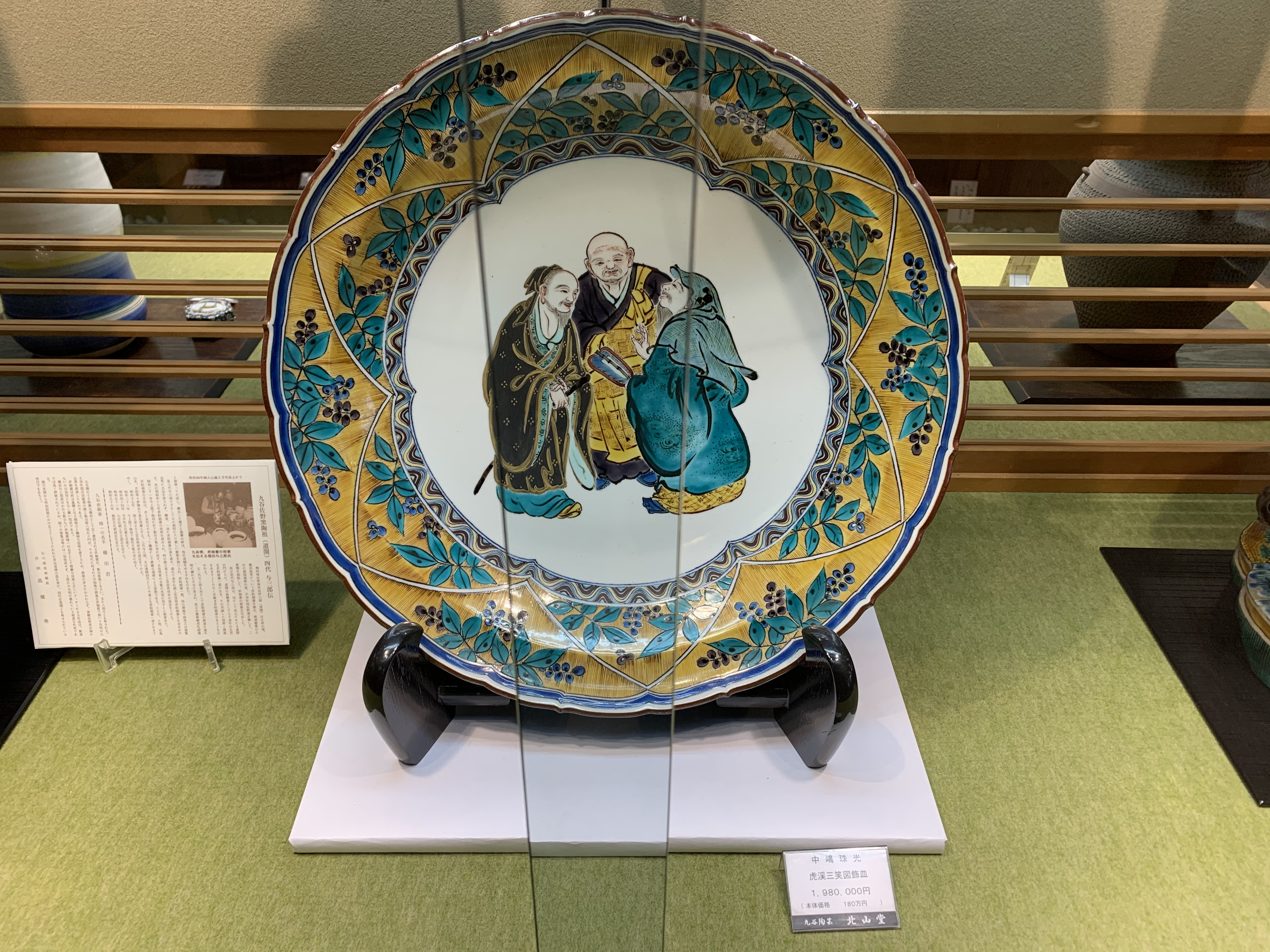
Three laughs at Tiger Brook (ceramic)

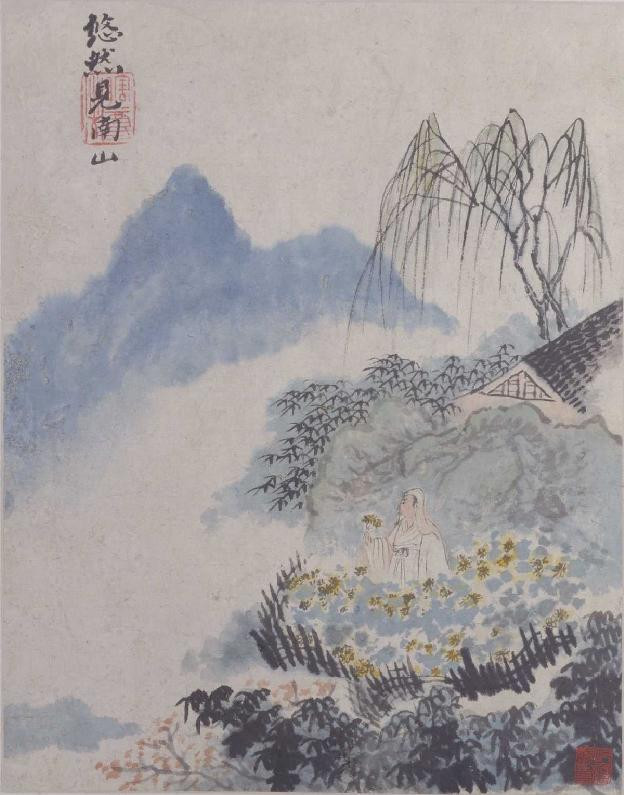
Illustrations in the Spirit of Tao Yuanming's Poems 02, Shitao (Zhu Ruoli, Buddhist name Yuanji, 1642-ca. 1707), Qing dynasty (1644–1911). Undated, album, ink and color on paper, 27 × 21.3 cm

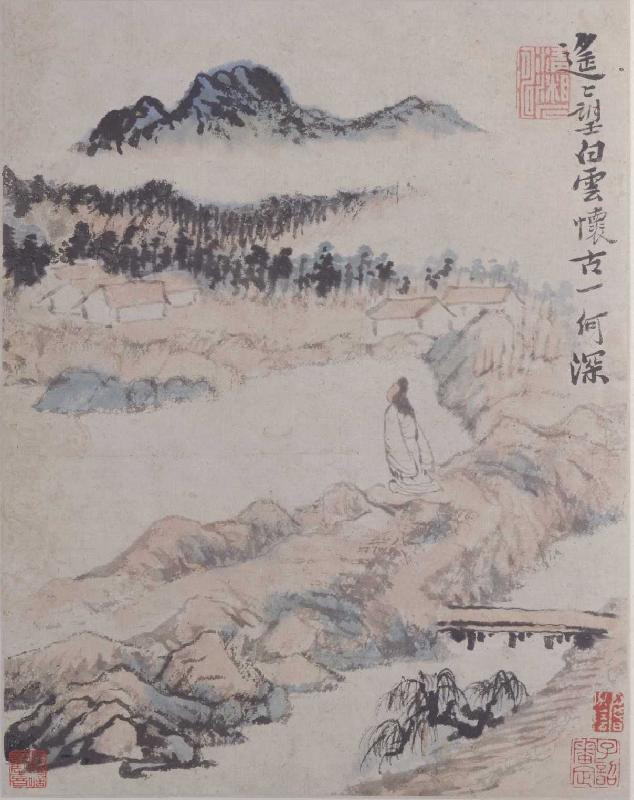
"Distant, distant I gaze at the white clouds:
With a deep yearning I think of the Sages of Antiquity."

A public domain audiobook version of Peach blossom Shangri La by Tao Yuanming (in English) - 00:05:02 - 2.3MB

== Translation ==
=== Editions ===
- Meng Erdong ed. Tao Yuanming Ji Yi Zhu ISBN 7-80626-064-1.
- Wu Zheshun ed. Tao Yuanming Ji ISBN 7-80520-683-X
- David Hinton (translator). The Selected Poems of T'ao Ch'ien (Copper Canyon Press, 1993) ISBN 1-55659-056-3.
- Karl-Heinz Pohl (translator). Der Pfirsichbluetenquell (Bochum University Press, 2002)
- Davis, A.R. T'ao Yuan-ming (Hong Kong, 1983) 2 vols.
- William Acker (translator). T'ao the Hermit: Sixty Poems by T'ao Ch'ien, 365–427 (London & New York: Thames and Hudson, 1952)
- Philippe Uguen-Lyon (translator), Tao Yuanming : Œuvres complètes 陶淵明集, Paris, Les Belles Lettres, 2022 ISBN 978-2251452500.

=== Commentary ===
- Ashmore, Robert. The Transport of Reading: Text and Understanding in the World of Tao Qian (365–427) (Cambridge: Harvard University Asia Center, 2010) ISBN 9780674053212
- Hightower, James R. Poetry of T'ao Ch'ien ISBN 0-19-815440-2. Revised Edition The Poetry of Tao Qian 陶潛 (Tao Yuanming 陶淵明) 365-427 (Quirin Press 2024) ISBN 978-1-922169-28-0
- Xiaofei Tian. Tao Yuanming and Manuscript Culture: The Record of a Dusty Table ISBN 978-0-295-98553-4.

== See also ==
- Boyi and Shuqi
- Chinese garden
- Classical Chinese poetry
- Fields and Gardens poetry
- History of Jiangxi
- Humble Administrator's Garden
- I. M. Pei
- Six Dynasties poetry
- Three laughs at Tiger Brook
- Utopia
- Xin Qiji
- Zhang Heng
