= Jiangxi Provincial Parliament =

Jiangxi Provincial Parliament (Chinese: 江西省議會) was the highest legislature of Jiangxi between 1912 and 1924.

Jiangxi Provincial Parliament was created on 1 February 1912, based on Jiangxi Provincial Consultative Bureau (江西省諮議局). After 3 congresses held in 1912, 1918, 1921, the Parliament was dislocated owing to numerous wars during the Northern Expedition and other political reasons.
