= Three laughs at Tiger Brook =

Chinese proverb

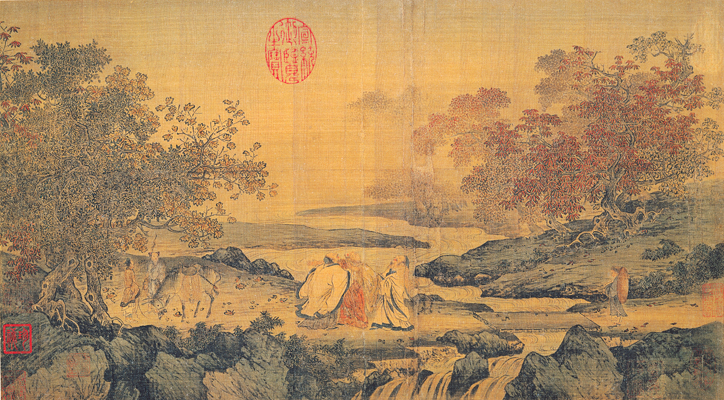
The three representative sages laughing at themselves having unexpectedly crossed Tiger Brook, 12th century, Song Dynasty.

Three laughs at Tiger Brook (Chinese: 虎溪三笑; pinyin: hǔ xī sān xiào; Gan: fû ki sam siēu) is a Chinese proverb which refers to the image that the three men, Huiyuan, Tao Yuanming and Lu Xiujing laugh together when arriving at Huxi (虎溪, Tiger Brook) of Mount Lu. This concept represents the ideal harmonious relations of Confucianism, Taoism and Buddhism in ancient China.

== Origin ==
The proverb derives from the story of the retired civil servant and Buddhist monk Huiyuan (334–416), who used never to go farther than the Huxi, either for a solitary walk or a friend's visit. Moreover, the tiger in its forest would roar, warning him whenever he had crossed the brook and entered its territory. One day, however, on the visit of the Confucian poet Tao Yuanming (365–427), and Taoist Lu Xiujing (406–477), Huiyuan had a congenial talk with them. So engrossing indeed was their conversation that they only realized they had passed the brook when they heard the roar of the tiger, whereupon the sages laughed wisely together.

The story of the three smiles at Tiger Creek has always been loved by painters, and various artworks with the theme of the three smiles at Tiger Creek have emerged, with many heirloom paintings. The earliest written works of this kind of painting subject are the late Five Dynasties, early Song Dynasty, Shi Ke painted "Three Smiles at Tiger Creek" and Song Dynasty, Li Gonglin made "Three Smiles" as the most ancient, the most famous surviving is the anonymous Southern Song Dynasty "Three Smiles at Tiger Creek" hidden in the National Palace Museum in Taipei. Other famous surviving works include the late Ming and early Qing dynasty Chen Hongshou's "Three Smiles in Tiger Stream" in Wuhan Museum. In modern times, Fu Baoshi's "Three Smiles in Tiger Stream" is in Nanjing Museum. Liang Kai of the Song Dynasty, Yan Hui of the late Song and early Yuan Dynasties, Guo Daidai, Wu Wei, Zhou Chen, Du Junze, You Qiu, Lu Ji'an and Xu Conglong of the Qing Dynasty, Gu Yi Zhou, Yaming and Liu Danzhai of the modern era also have such paintings in existence.

The painting "A Harmonious Group", painted by Emperor Xianzong of the Ming Dynasty shortly after his accession to the throne, is also based on the story of the Three Smiles of Tiger Creek, and is now in the Palace Museum in Beijing. At first glance, this picture looks like a person, but on closer inspection it is actually a Confucian, a monk and a trio of people looking at each other and laughing together, with an exquisite composition.

This painting is the subject of a painting of Confucianism, Buddhism and Taoism figures. Tao Yuanming, a Confucian, and Lu Xiujing, a Taoist, visit the monk Huiyuan, who is practicing in Mount Lu, and the three of them are laughing on the way back, and Huiyuan, who is sending the guest, unconsciously crosses the Tiger Creek, where he is confined, and the three of them are laughing at each other, which is the content of the painting of the three laughing figures in Tiger Creek. Later on, it was regarded as a symbol of affinity between Confucianism, Buddhism and Taoism, and the surviving paintings of this kind are the most ancient ones painted by Shi Ke in the Song Dynasty.
