= Vase with Poet Zhou Dunyi =

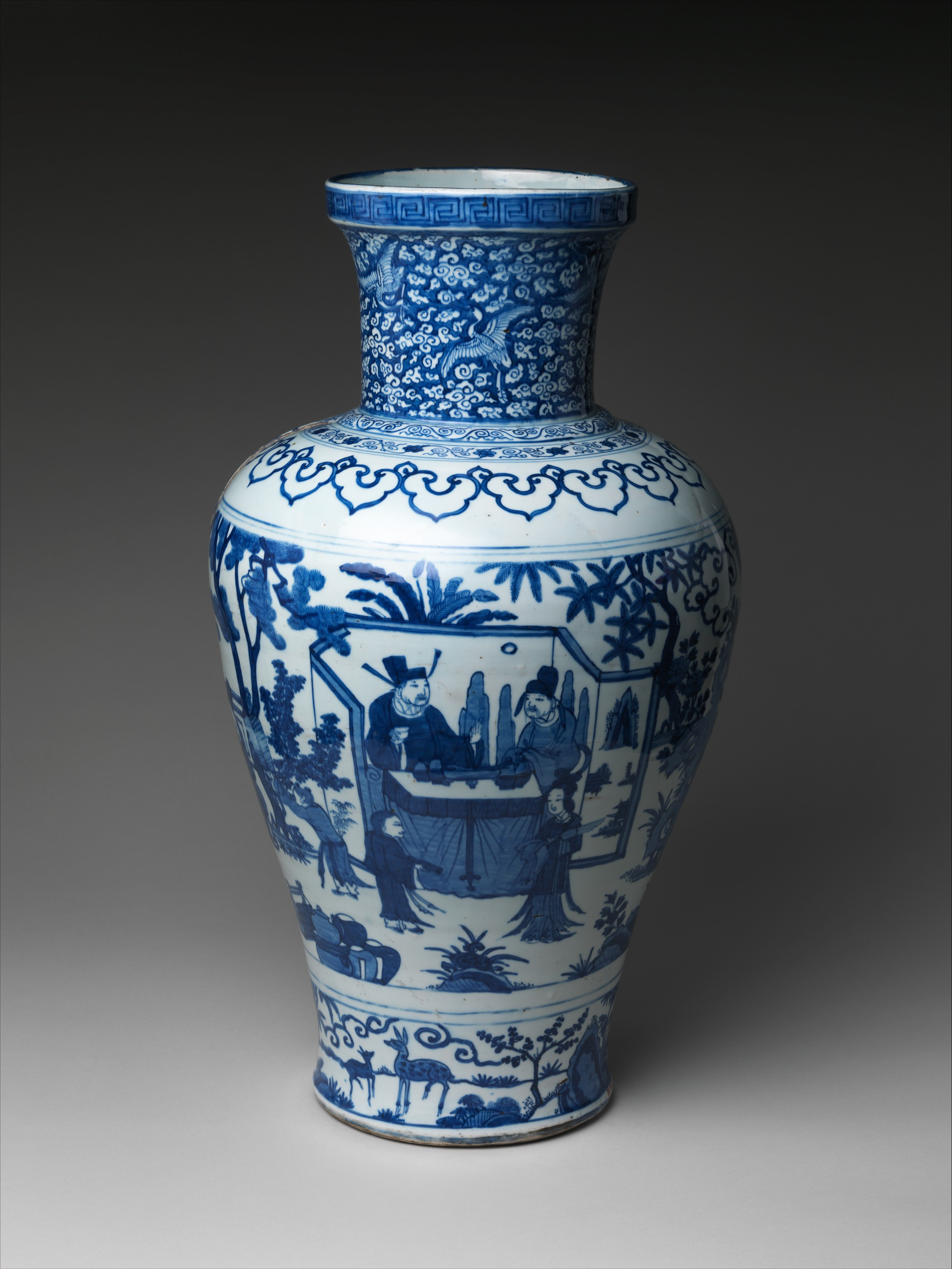
- Year: 1587
- Medium: Ceramics
- Movement: Ming Dynasty (1368-1644), Wanli mark and period (1573-1620)
- Dimensions: Height: 60.3 cm; Rim: 19.4 cm Base: 20 cm cm diameter
- Location: Metropolitan Museum of Art

The Vase with the Poet Zhou Dunyi is a Chinese blue and white porcelain vase produced in 1587, during the Ming Dynasty. The vase has a Wanli Emperor mark and period qualities, with cobalt blue underglaze paintings beneath the transparent ceramic glaze, including the poet Zhou Dunyi. The vase is now in the Metropolitan Museum of Art in New York City, purchased via the credit line of the Rogers Fund within the Museum.

== Porcelain ==
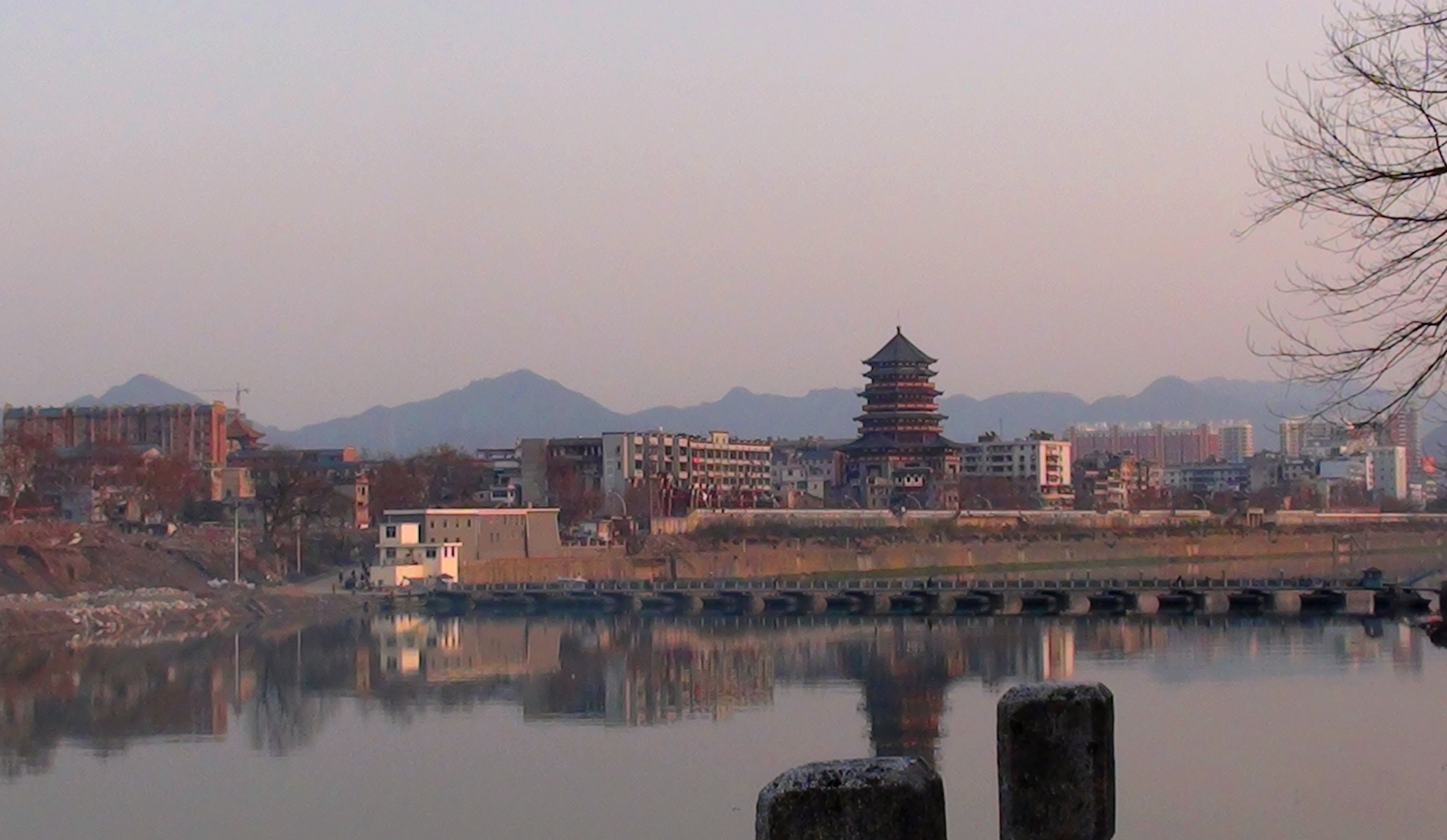
Jingdezhen City

The vase is Jingdezhen porcelain from the largest area of production of fine Chinese porcelain. Porcelain is a ceramic material characterised by its fine, light, strong, white translucent bodies. This porcelain consists of kaolin clay and petuntse, a feldspathic rock, which when fired at temperatures between 1200-1400 degrees vitrifies the clay materials into porcelain. Until the 18th century these techniques were only achieved in China, Japan and Korea, accounting for its high value as a commodity when it was originally produced and first traded in between 5000-1700 BCE.

From the 6th century to the 8th century China was considered the most advanced producer of porcelain with hundreds of kiln complexes producing the wares for trade at local markets and for international export. From the 14th to 15th century production methods changed and China saw a significant decrease in the number of operating kiln complexes only to see a central location for the production to appear within the Junangxi complex, now known as the city of Jingdezhen. This city soon housed the largest kiln complex in the world and produced hundreds of thousands ceramics per year. The porcelain produced was used for religious practices as embellishment objects. In addition to academic purposes including studying aesthetic value, leaning and erudition.

The production of the vase, like many other ceramics produced, was highly influenced by the cultural restoration that redefined and expanded the Ming Dynasty. The result of this was painters of the Ming Court were required to create works in didactic and realistic style. The Blue and white porcelain which constituted these works of art was said to suggest a broader interest in other cultures specifically international networks of trade that reached from Asia to Africa, the Middle East and parts of Europe.

== Characteristics ==
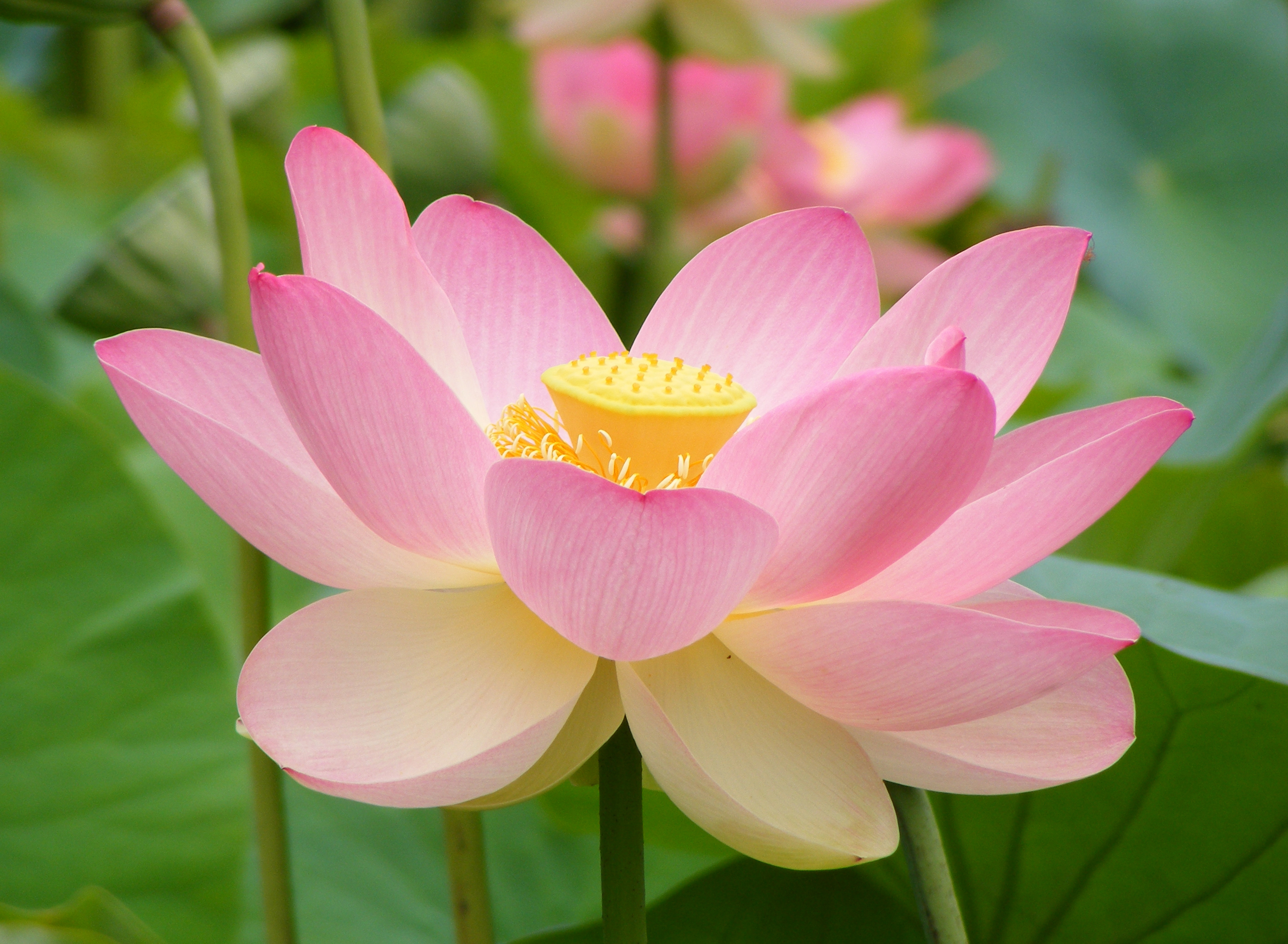
Lotus Blossom

The surface of the vase is painted with blue cobalt and divided into horizontal sections, with a geometric broader decorating the lip. The visuals on the neck of the vase illustrate decorative clouds with white cranes flying amongst them, layered above the dark blue background. The crane is interpreted as a symbol of longevity, due to its status as high ranking bird in the imperial hierarchy, with its white feathers representing its ability to live a long life. The stylised clouds suggested luck, fortune and good fate. Below this sit two small horizontal registers that separate the neck and the shoulder of the vase. The first section is embellished with hatching and the one below with flowers, transiting to the shoulder of the vase which depicts the symbol of the Lingzhi Fungus design or Ruyi, translating to good wishes. Coming to the body of the vase, the largest surface area depicts a celebration of the style and material culture of Chinese Literati. Literati culture was significant in the Ming dynasty as images of the natural hierarchy became metaphors for China at that period of time. New class scholar officials depicted an increasing number of images of the private retreat, communicating the academic and social values of self cultivation and position as literati. This was done through poetry, calligraphy and visual arts. As seen in the Vase it effectively establishing their social position within Chinese academic society.

On one face of the vase, a figure said to be Zhou Dunyi, a renowned Chinese philosopher and official is portrayed sitting on a mat and supposedly gazing at a lotus pond. This is a common representation of the scholar as it is referencing his essay on the lotus flower, "On Love of the Lotus". Accompanying this, four young attendants at the upper left of the scene seem to be brewing tea for the Scholar Zhou and his companion. A large rock then separates these figures from an additional two, who can also be identified as scholars due to their clothing. An instrument called a zither sits before them, in addition to two attendants a man and a woman standing nearby also holding instruments. The scholars are drinking wine and sitting in front of folding screens on a covered table, implying the performance of a musical piece.

The foreground presents a picnic scene of a basket, wine and multiple jars made of gourd. A young lady with a fan standing close by, effectively transiting the musical performance scene around the vase to another setting of four gentlemen in a peaceful environment sitting around a low table drinking wine. Below this another visual register occurs separating a landscape of roaming cranes and a deer resting on the foot of the jar, suggesting a sense of hope and longevity.

== Zhou Dunyi ==
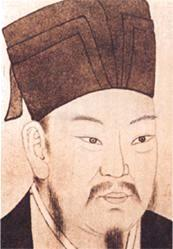
Zhou Dunyi

Zhou Dunyi, the central figure on the vase, was a Chinese philosopher and cosmologist. Born in 1017 the Chinese scholar, referred to as literati was considered by Thompson, J as one of the first "neo confucians". Neo-Confucians refers to a stream of Confucian thinking that prevailed amongst scholars in the early Song Dynasty (960–1279 CE). This way of thinking was characterised by both Buddhist and Daoist metaphysics which attempted to communicate the details of Confucian Philosophy. Zhou personally investigates spirituality in relation to morality and politics. Additionally Zhou's study stems from what Thompson describes it as "Buddhist notions of equanimity and compassion".

Zhou was born in Daozhou, with the given name of "Dunshi". This was soon changed to Dunyi in 1063 when Emperor Yingzong came into power as it was the commons practice in Chinese culture, specifically in families of scholar officials that prohibited the use of the name of the emperor. Later in his lifetime, Zhou moved to Xingzi in Jiangxi, the province in which the porcelain was primarily produced, explaining the relationship between his work and his presence on the vase. Furthermore Thompson explains that Zhou was not well known throughout his lifetime, despite his heavy influence over Zhu Xi, who was a significant figure in the emergence of neo-confucians thought. He additionally tutored two young individuals Cheng Hao (1032-1085) and Cheng Yi (1033-1107), which contributed to his standing as a well-regarded intuitive by his contemporaries. Only later was Zhou regarded by others Neo Confucians as an "exemplar of authenticity". This assists in explaining why the vase was created (1587) significantly after Zhou's death (1073), when appreciation and acknowledgement of his contribution to Literati culture was realised.

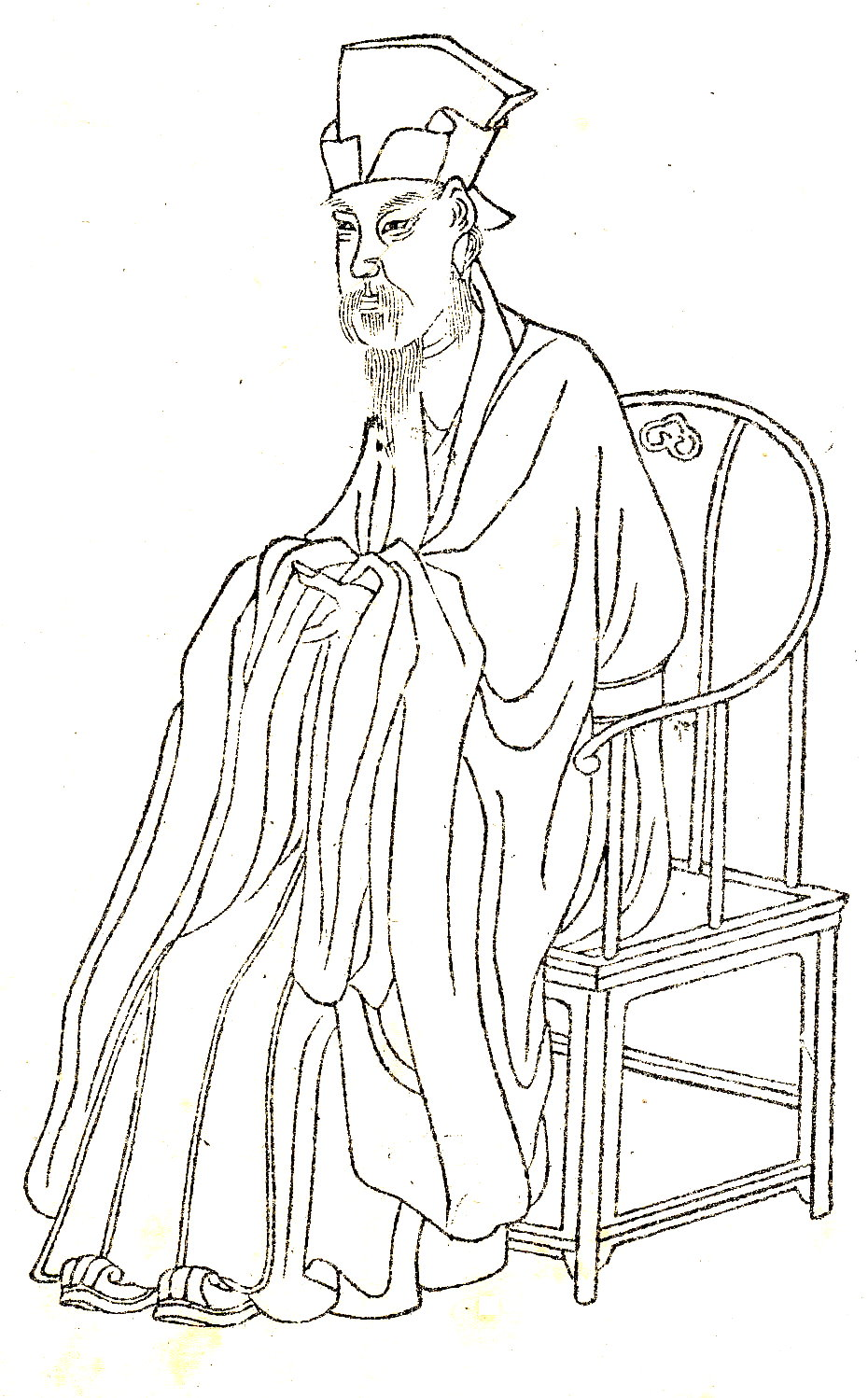
Zhou Dunyi

Zhou's presence of the vase observing the lotus flower, refers directly to his poem "On the Love of the Lotus", composed in 1071. It was written shortly after he built his personal retreat, Lianxi. This was located on the foot of Mount Lu where in front of his study he constructed a pond in which to observe the lotus blossoms. This is where Zhou and many other retired literati spent their time, observing the blossoms, a symbol of purity and purpose. This scene closely resembles that that is presented on the vase. Zhou's piece "On the love of the Lotus" is describes as his ode to the blossom, the piece whilst addressing his anthropocosmic insight, which is addressed in many of his works. For Zhou, the poem communicates the spiritual and cosmic harmony, conceptualising his understanding of human life the universal/cosmic forces. The lotus is referred to in the poem as the gentleman (junzi) among flowers, which in Confucian thinking was considered an ideal trait of human beings.

Many Chinese literati works, specifically Zhous's writing in "On the Love of the Lotus" draw on cultural ideology stemming from Confucian, Daoist, and Buddhist philosophy. This is present within the image of the lotus specifically, as Zhou writes "I love the lotus for rising from the mud yet remaining unstained; bathed by fire currents and yet not seductive". Thompson understands this to be presenting Zhou's tranquil mood, whilst highlighting his attentive state of awareness, giving insight into his wise manner and way of viewing his surroundings, as seen in his presence on the vase. This viewer is subsequently encouraged to broaden their thinking by contemplating the actions and lifestyle of Zhou, the largest and most dominant figure depicted on the vase. Zhou is celebrated for his "intellectual and moral fortitude" offered to viewers as a figure of exemplary moral virtue, depicted to the viewer through reading the vase, following the scenes around the exterior through a series of interrelating visual devices.

== Use ==
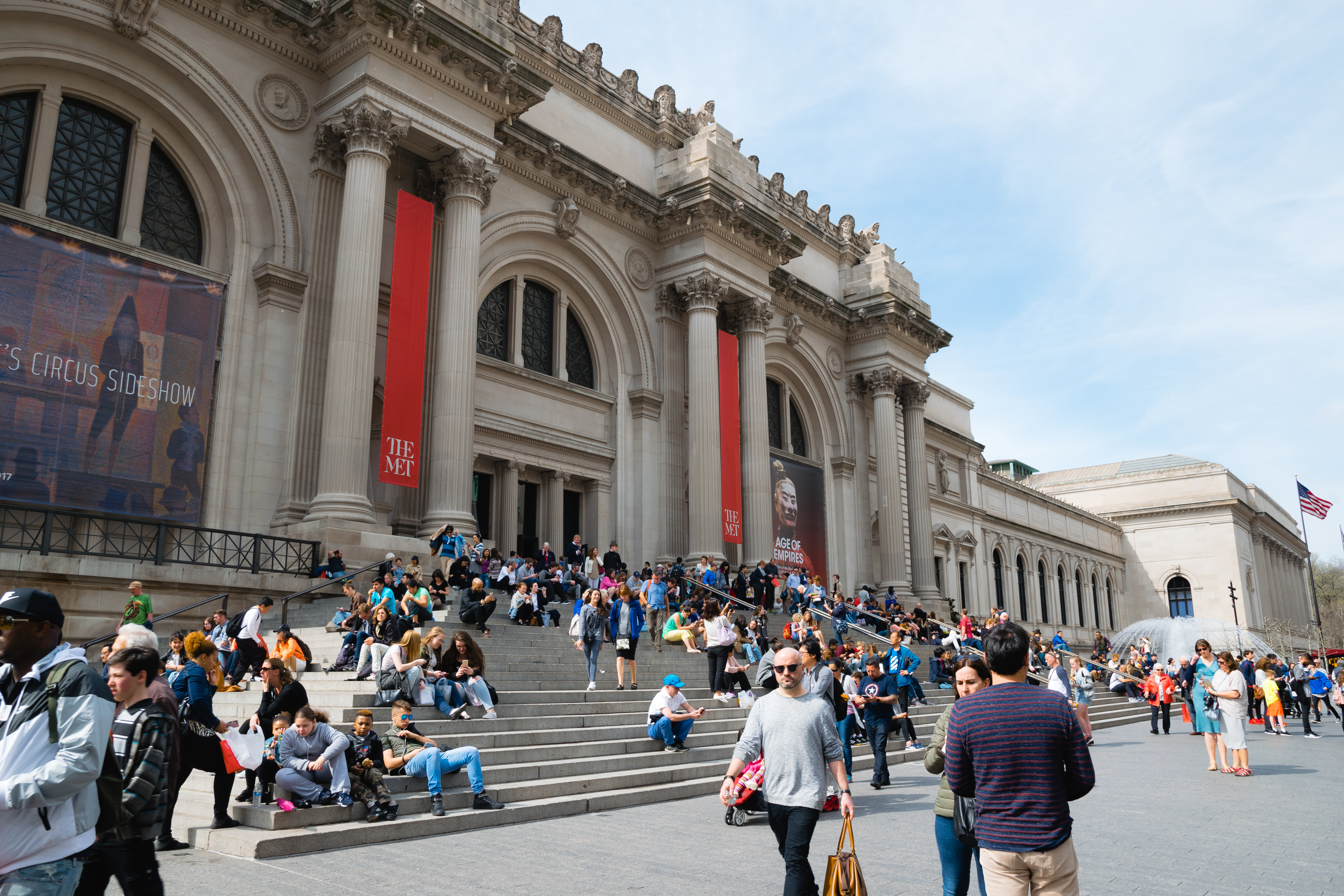
The Metropolitan Museum of Art

The height of the vase is 60.3 cm, with a rim diameter of 32.3cm and base of 20cm. With these large dimensions this vase was highly likely to be commissioned, its large scale would have facilitated the use of the vase for formal or public display as opposed to personal use. The Metropolitan Museum (n.d.) confirmed this through the analysis of the cobalt blue letters in the sunken panel on the bottom of the vase.

Additionally the vase carries two lines on each side, marking characters that read "Wanli Ding mo nain zao", and four characters in the middle of the vase "qian fu ying yong" refereeing an auxiliary palace for intended display. A breakage in the porcelain above the image of the four scholars is suggested to be a result of a crumble during the firing process accounting for why the vase never reached the Palace in the South West. Instead the vase was said to be bought by a less-demanding owner before ending up in the Metropolitan Museum in the 1920s.
