= Streptomyces jiujiangensis =

Scientific classification
- Domain: Bacteria
- Kingdom: Bacillati
- Phylum: Actinomycetota
- Class: Actinomycetia
- Order: Streptomycetales
- Family: Streptomycetaceae
- Genus: Streptomyces
- Species: S. jiujiangensis

Binomial name
- Streptomyces jiujiangensis Zhang et al. 2014

Type strain
- BCRC 16953, KCTC 29262, JXJ0074

Species of bacterium

Streptomyces jiujiangensis is a bacterium species from the genus of Streptomyces which has been isolated from rhizosphere soil from a pine tree from the Mount Lu in the Jiangxi province in China. Streptomyces jiujiangensis produces antialgal compounds.

== See also ==
- List of Streptomyces species
