= Catholic Church of Mount Lu =

Catholic church in Jiujiang, China

- 庐山天主堂
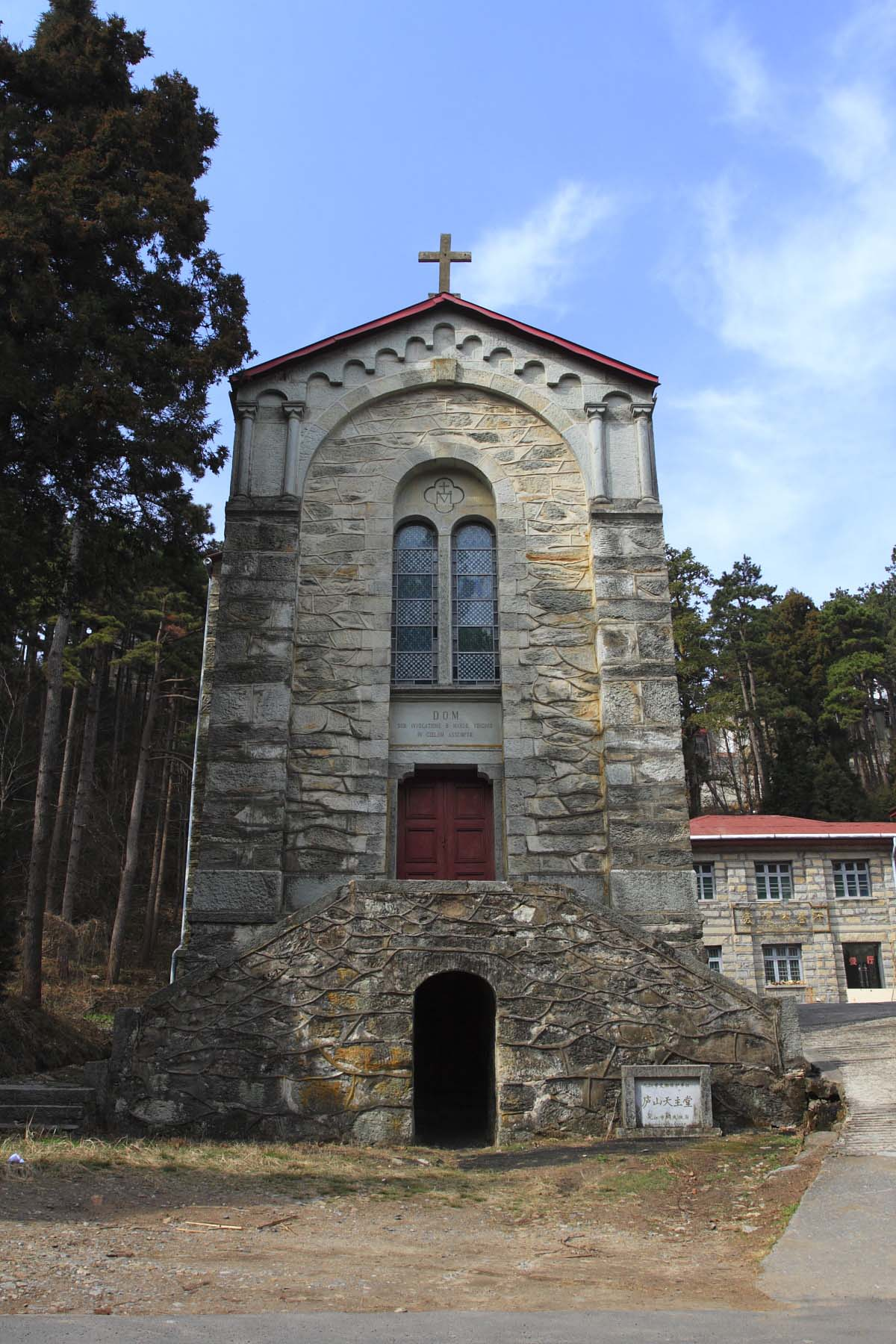
- Frontal view of the Catholic Church of Mount Lu

Religion
- Affiliation: Roman Catholic

Location
- Location: Mount Lu, Jiujiang, Jiangxi
- Country: China
- Interactive map of Catholic Church of Mount Lu
- Coordinates: 29°33′59.04″N 115°58′18.12″E

Architecture
- Founder: Louis-Elisée Fatiguet (樊体爱)
- Established: 1903
- Completed: 1903

Catholic Church of Mount Lu (simplified Chinese: 庐山天主堂; traditional Chinese: 廬山天主堂; pinyin: Lúshān Tiānzhǔtáng) is a Catholic Church on Mount Lu in Jiujiang, Jiangxi, China.

== History ==
The Catholic Church of Mount Lu was originally built in 1903, eight years before the fall of the Qing dynasty (1644–1911). It is said that the church was designed and built by French missionary Louis-Elisée Fatiguet (樊体爱).

It was inscribed as a municipal-level protection unit by the Jiujiang Municipal Government in 1986.

== Architecture ==
The church faces the south and its shape is like a rectangle. It is 18-metre (59 ft) long, 9-metre (30 ft) wide and 16-metre (52 ft) high. There is a cross on the roof.

== Gallery ==
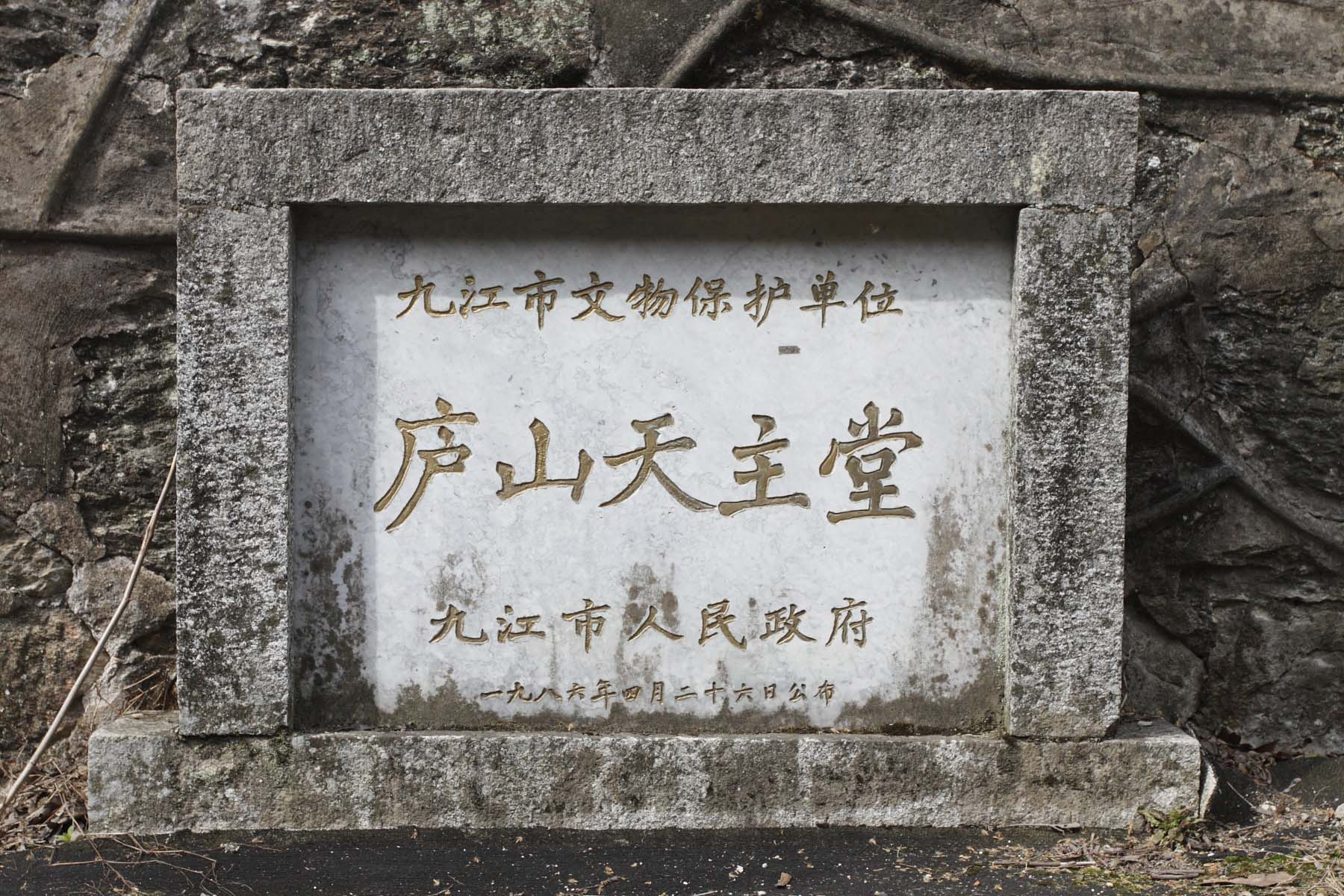
Stele in the Catholic Church of Mount Lu

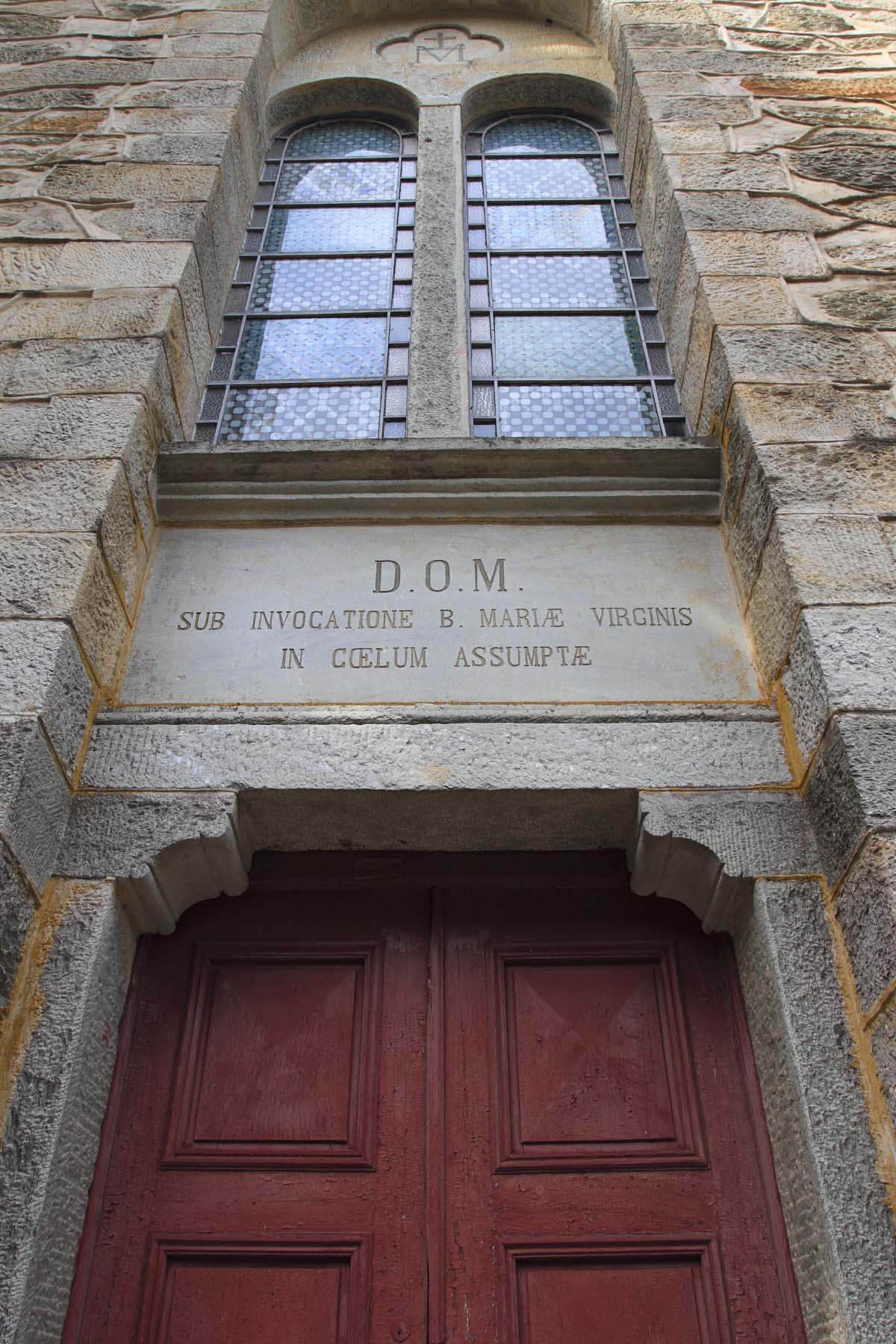
Gate of the Catholic Church of Mount Lu

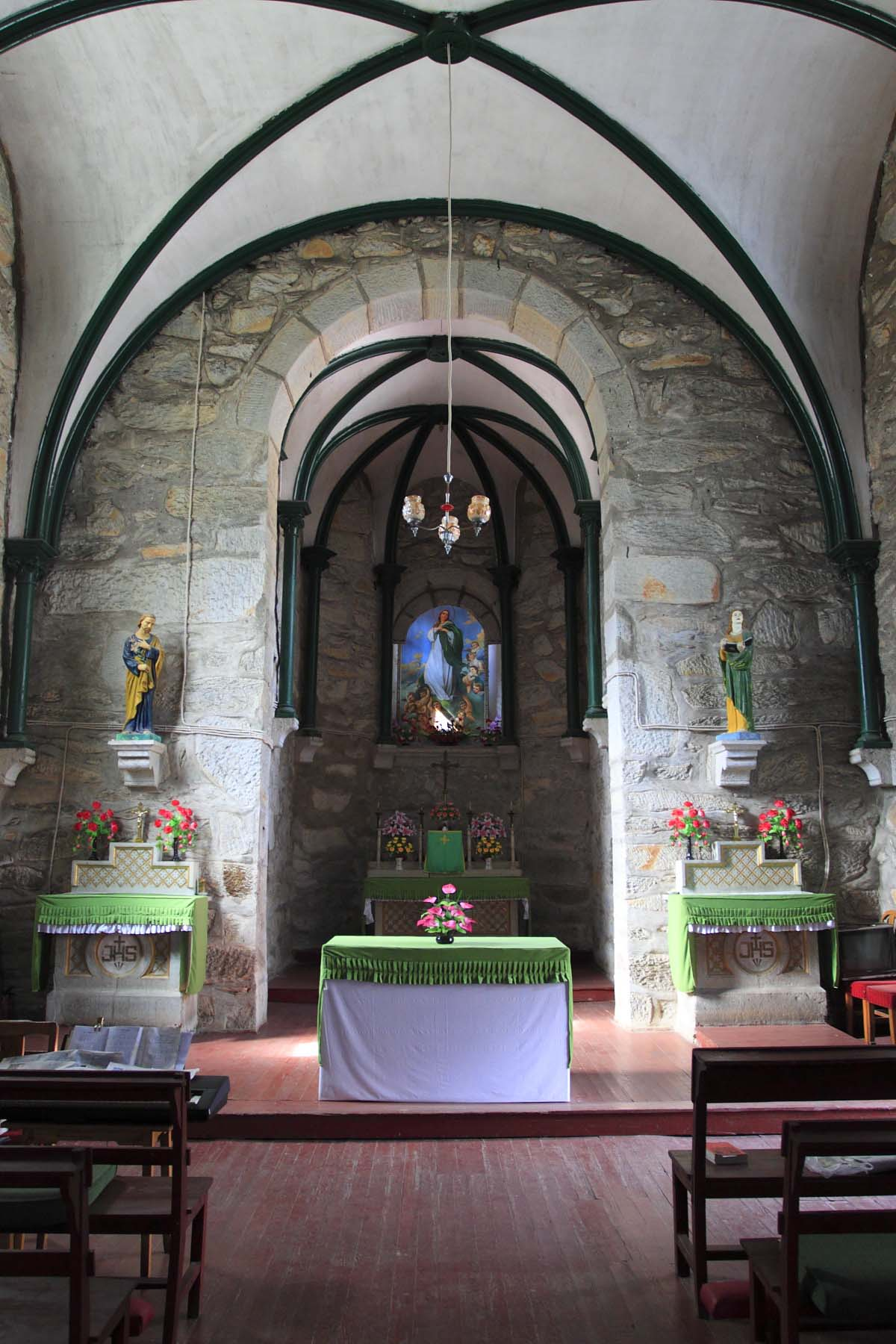
Internal of the Catholic Church of Mount Lu
