= Bailu, Lushan =

Bailu 白鹿镇
- Town
- Location in Jiangxi Bailu (China)
- Coordinates: 29°29′11″N 116°2′25″E
- Country: People's Republic of China
- Province: Jiangxi
- Prefecture-level city: Jiujiang
- County-level city: Lushan City
- Time zone: UTC+8 (China Standard)

Bailu (Chinese: 白鹿; pinyin: Báilù; lit. 'White Deer') is a town under the administration of Lushan City, Jiujiang, China. As of 2018, it has one residential community, 9 villages and one forest area under its administration.
