= Guling, Jiangxi =

Guling 牯岭镇
- Town
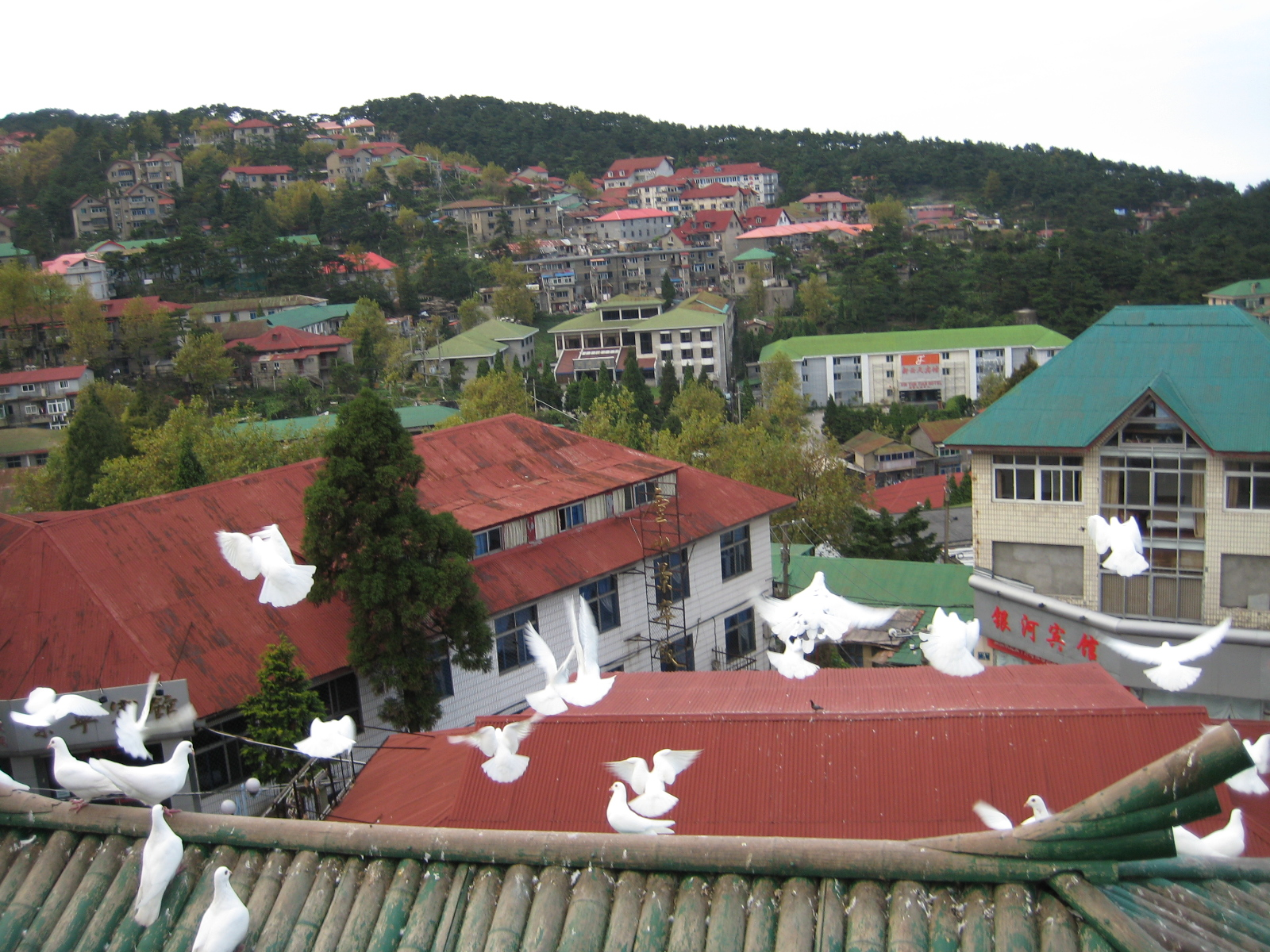
- Interactive map of Guling
- Coordinates: 29°34′13″N 115°58′36″E
- Country: China
- Location: Mount Lu, Jiujiang
- Founder: Edward Selby Little (李德立), Dr. Edgerton Haskell Hart, and three others
- Time zone: UTC+8 (China Standard)

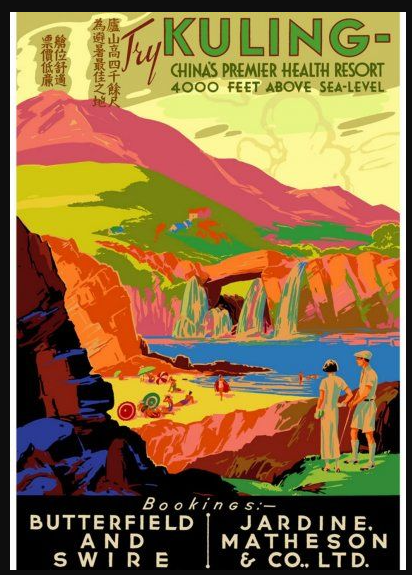
Kuling Poster in the 1920s

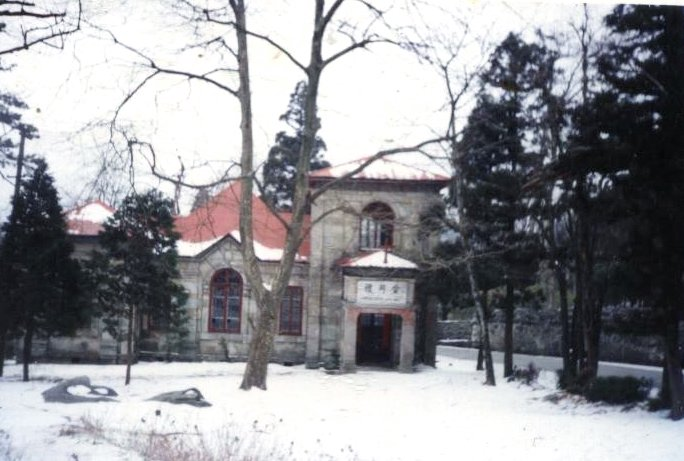
Christian church in Kuling

Guling, formerly romanized as Kuling, is a summer resort located on top of Mount Lu in Jiujiang, Jiangxi. It was formerly a resort reserved for European missionaries. Now it is the tourist and administration center of the Lushan Geopark, a World Heritage Site.

As of 2018, it has 5 residential communities, 2 villages, and 4 other neighborhoods under its administration.

== History ==
=== European settlement history ===
Kuling, now called Guling, on the slopes of a wide valley of Mount Lu, was established in 1895 by the missionaries Edward Selby Little, Dr. Edgerton Haskell Hart, and three others, as a sanitarium and rest resort for Western missionaries in southern China. They built their houses in the colonial style of architecture, and added churches, schools, and sports facilities. It was named by Little, as a pun: it is wonderfully cooling after the summer heat in the plains below. It was also a word that sounded conveniently Chinese to the local people, and has been adopted by them. Kuling was run by the missionaries in a Kuling Council that sold the plots of the land and with the proceeds, paid for local services and security. In 1910, Caroline Maddock Hart and four others met to found the Nurses Association of China, with Caroline Maddock Hart being its first president.

=== The Republic of China history ===
In 1934, Soong Mei-ling, then first Lady of the Republic of China, was given a villa in Kuling town, Mount Lu. She and her husband Chiang Kai-shek both loved the villa very much. Chiang Kai-shek named the villa as Mei Lu Villa to symbolize the beauty of Mount Lu. The couple usually stayed at this villa in Kuling town, Mount Lu, in summer time, so the mountain is called Summer Capital, and the villa is called the Summer Palace.

Prior to 1949, President Chiang Kai-shek chose Mount Lu as the summer headquarters for his nationalist Kuomintang government, having been introduced to the place by his wife Soong Mei-ling, the daughter of a Shanghai Methodist minister. It was here that, in 1946, the U.S. special diplomatic mission representing the President of the United States, led by General George C. Marshall, met with Chiang Kai-shek to discuss the role of post-World War II China.

=== Modern history ===
After the conclusion of the Chinese Communist Revolution in 1949, it became the favourite meeting place for the Central Committee of the Chinese Communist Party because Chairman Mao used Chiang Kai-shek's house as one of his holiday homes. It hosted the Eighth Plenum of the Eighth Central Committee, also known as the Mount Lu Conference or "Plenum", which began on 23 July and convened on 2 August 1959. Kuling also hosted the Second Plenum of the Ninth Central Committee in August 1970.

The movie Romance on Lushan Mountain, which has been shown in the Mount Lu theatre non-stop since 1980, was recognised by Guinness World Records as the longest-running movie in theatres. Each ticket sold to this movie is numbered according to ticket sales to date. As of May 2006, this number was close to 140 million tickets.

== Notable residents ==
- Pearl S. Buck (1892–1973) won the Nobel Prize in Literature in 1938 for her descriptions of peasant life in China. She was the first American woman to win. She also won the Pulitzer Prize in 1932. She spent her childhood with her family in Kuling in summertime. Her father built a stone villa in Kuling in 1897 and lived there until his death in 1931.
- Mervyn Peake (1911–1968) was born in Kuling. He was an English writer, artist, poet, and illustrator. He was well known for being the illustrator of Alice's Adventures in Wonderland and the author of the Gormenghast series of novels.
- Lo-Yi Chang (1907–1988) was born in Kuling. She was the spouse of T. V. Soong, then Premier of the Republic of China. She has made significant contributions of promoting interculture understandings between China and western countries.

== Climate ==
Climate data for Guling, elevation 1,165 m (3,822 ft), (1991–2020 normals, extremes 1981–2010)
Month	Jan	Feb	Mar	Apr	May	Jun	Jul	Aug	Sep	Oct	Nov	Dec	Year
Record high °C (°F)	19.4 (66.9)	20.5 (68.9)	24.6 (76.3)	26.4 (79.5)	28.1 (82.6)	29.3 (84.7)	31.8 (89.2)	31.8 (89.2)	30.2 (86.4)	28.5 (83.3)	25.1 (77.2)	18.9 (66.0)	31.8 (89.2)
Mean daily maximum °C (°F)	4.5 (40.1)	7.0 (44.6)	11.0 (51.8)	16.8 (62.2)	20.7 (69.3)	23.2 (73.8)	26.1 (79.0)	25.3 (77.5)	21.9 (71.4)	17.3 (63.1)	12.7 (54.9)	7.0 (44.6)	16.1 (61.0)
Daily mean °C (°F)	0.6 (33.1)	2.9 (37.2)	6.7 (44.1)	12.5 (54.5)	16.8 (62.2)	19.8 (67.6)	22.5 (72.5)	21.8 (71.2)	18.1 (64.6)	13.3 (55.9)	8.5 (47.3)	2.9 (37.2)	12.2 (54.0)
Mean daily minimum °C (°F)	−2.3 (27.9)	−0.1 (31.8)	3.5 (38.3)	9.1 (48.4)	13.7 (56.7)	17.3 (63.1)	20.3 (68.5)	19.5 (67.1)	15.7 (60.3)	10.5 (50.9)	5.5 (41.9)	−0.2 (31.6)	9.4 (48.9)
Record low °C (°F)	−13.6 (7.5)	−11.6 (11.1)	−10.4 (13.3)	−5.1 (22.8)	1.6 (34.9)	5.8 (42.4)	11.9 (53.4)	12.8 (55.0)	6.5 (43.7)	−2.4 (27.7)	−9.9 (14.2)	−16.7 (1.9)	−16.7 (1.9)
Average precipitation mm (inches)	85.3 (3.36)	98.5 (3.88)	167.9 (6.61)	202.2 (7.96)	251.2 (9.89)	306.1 (12.05)	274.2 (10.80)	290.3 (11.43)	147.8 (5.82)	97.4 (3.83)	83.0 (3.27)	61.7 (2.43)	2,065.6 (81.33)
Average precipitation days (≥ 0.1 mm)	14.3	13.7	17.0	16.7	16.2	17.4	13.5	15.3	10.8	10.4	11.7	11.2	168.2
Average snowy days	9.3	6.7	3.5	0.1	0	0	0	0	0	0	1.3	5.2	26.1
Average relative humidity (%)	73	76	77	77	79	85	85	87	84	75	69	65	78
Mean monthly sunshine hours	112.3	102.4	112.9	130.4	136.5	111.4	175.7	153.9	147.6	158.8	144.0	142.7	1,628.6
Percentage possible sunshine	35	32	30	34	32	27	41	38	40	45	45	45	37
Source: China Meteorological Administration
