= Lushan Geopark =

Park in Jiangxi Province, China

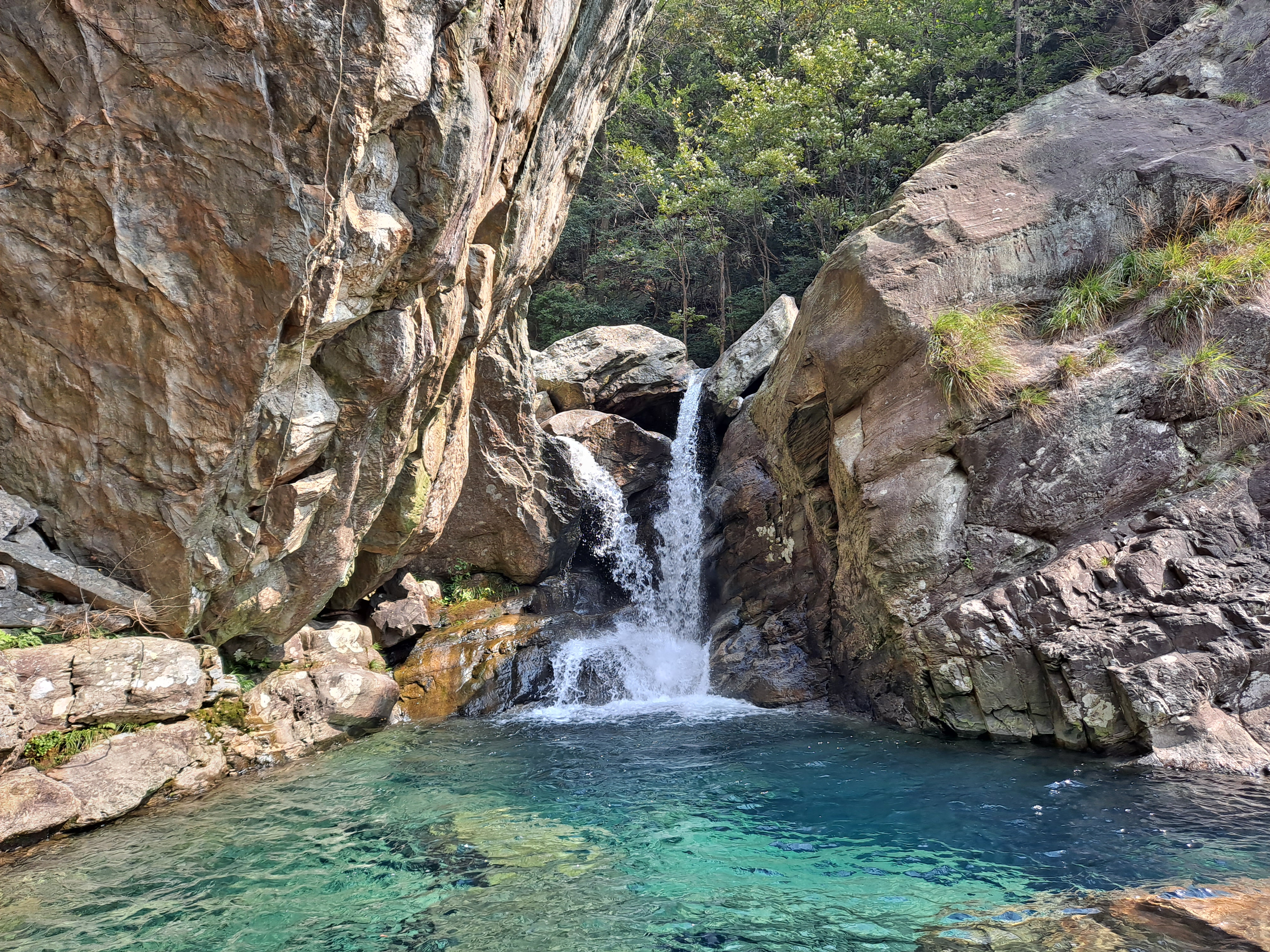
- Waterfall at Lushan Geopark
- Interactive map of Lushan Geopark
- Location: Xingzi County, Jiangxi
- Nearest city: Jiujiang City
- Coordinates: 29°33′15″N 115°59′25″E
- Area: 548 square kilometres (212 sq mi)
- Created: 1934

Chinese name
- Simplified Chinese: 庐山地质公园
- Traditional Chinese: 廬山地質公園
Transcriptions
Standard Mandarin
- Hanyu Pinyin: Lúshān Dìzhì Gōngyuán

Lushan Geopark (庐山世界地质公园) is located in the region around Mount Lu, Jiujiang. The protected area of 500 square kilometres (190 mi^{2}) extends from the Yangtze River to the Poyang Lake basin.

== Landmarks ==
=== Natural landmarks ===
The park area features the effects of Quaternary glaciation, and exceptional geological upthrown fault scarps from the Quaternary age.

The resulting landscapes include: Lu'shan—Mount Lu, other mountains and summit peaks, valleys, gorges, gullies, rock formations, natural caves, and waterfalls.

=== Cultural landmarks ===
The area also contains large numbers of Taoist and Buddhist temples, as well as several landmarks of Confucianism

There are also famous stone bridges and caves.

According to UNESCO, the region was a Summer Capital of the Republic of China in the 30s and 40s. It was a resort that was popular with wealthy foreign visitors. Mt. Lushan was inspiration for many poets.

== Conservation ==
In 1996, Mount Lu became an UNESCO World Heritage Site. In 2004, Lushan Geopark became a member of Global Geoparks Network.

The park is a popular visitor and tourist attraction, and is a cooler summer destination.

== See also ==
- Mount Lu — World Heritage Site.
- Members of the UNESCO Global Geoparks Network—GGN — Geoparks list.
