= Mount Lu =

Mountain in central China

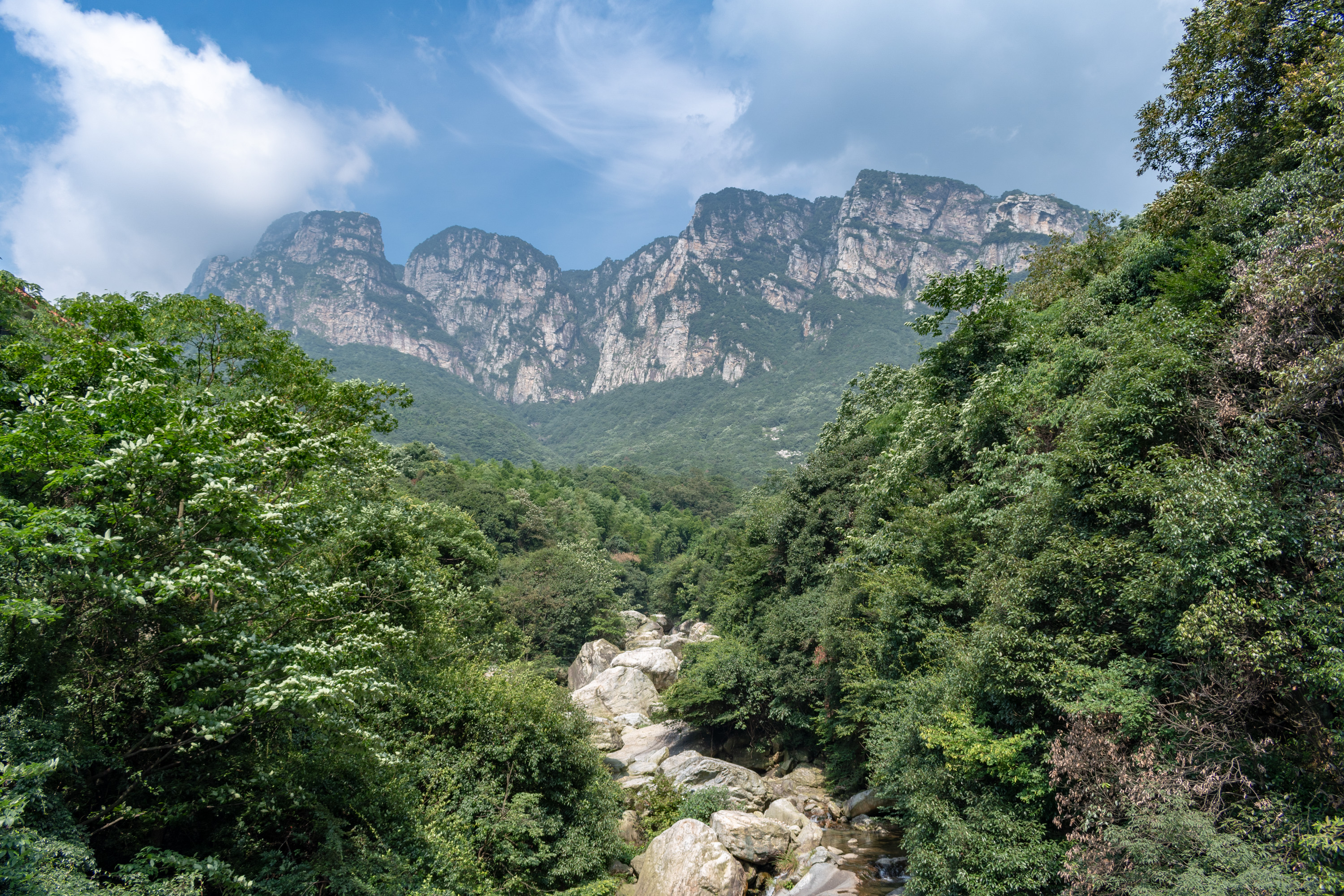
- Mount Lu from foot

Highest point
- Elevation: 4,836 ft (1,474 m)
- Coordinates: 29.5594°N 115.9934°E

Geography
- Location within China
- Location: Lushan National Park, Jiangxi, China.

UNESCO World Heritage Site
- Official name: Lushan National Park
- Criteria: Cultural: ii, iii, vi, v, vi
- Reference: 778
- Inscription: 1996 (20th Session)
- Area: 30,200 ha (75,000 acres)

Mount Lu or Lushan (simplified Chinese: 庐山; traditional Chinese: 廬山; pinyin: Lúshān, Gan: Lu-san) is a mountain situated in Jiujiang, Jiangxi, China. It was also known as Kuanglu (匡廬) in ancient times. The mountain and its immediate area are officially designated as the Lushan National Park, and it is one of the most renowned mountains in the country. Mount Lu is located primarily in Lushan City within Jiujiang, although its northern portions are found in Jiujiang's Lianxi District. The oval-shaped mountains are about 25 kilometers (16 mi) long and 10 kilometers (6.2 mi) wide, and neighbors Jiujiang and the Yangtze River to the north, Nanchang to the south, and Poyang Lake to the east. Its highest point is Dahanyang Peak (大汉阳峰), reaching 1,474 meters (4,836 ft) above sea level. Dahayang Peak is also one of the hundreds of steep peaks that tower above the so-called sea of clouds that can encompass the mountain for almost 200 days each year.

Mount Lu is known for its grandeur, steepness, and beauty and is a prominent tourist attraction, especially during the summer months when the weather is cooler in the mountains than elsewhere. The mountain and the surrounding region is also one of the "spiritual centers" of China, containing many Buddhist and Daoist temples in addition to landmarks of Confucianism. Due to its striking beauty and sacred importance, Lushan National Park has been a UNESCO World Heritage Site since 1996. The overlapping Lushan Quaternary Glaciation National Geopark is a member of the UNESCO Global Geoparks Network.

== History ==
Mount Lu contains important sites and temples for Daoism, (Mahayana) Buddhism, Confucianism, and even Christianity. Between AD 386 and 402 during the Jin dynasty, Huiyuan founded Pure Land Buddhism and Donglin Temple on the slopes of Mount Lu. During the Tang dynasty (618–907), Daoist temples were constructed nearby to house sacred scriptures. The White Deer Grotto Academy, founded in AD 940, was developed into a renowned center of academic research during the Song dynasty under the direction of Confucian scholar Zhu Xi. The academy was continually open until at least the 19th century. Other important medieval structures on the mountain include the grave of the famous Tang dynasty poet Tao Yuanming and imperial pavilions during the Ming dynasty.

The Song dynasty poet Su Shi famously described the difficulty of conveying the mountain's beauty in his expression, "Why can't I tell the true shape of Lushan? Because I myself am in the mountain."

In later years, Kuling in Mount Lu became a summer resort for Western missionaries in China. Absalom Sydenstricker, the father of Pearl Buck, was one of the first five missionaries to acquire a property in the Kuling Estate on the mountain. The development of Kuling was instigated by the Reverend Edward Little and Dr. Edgerton H. Hart. The four principal founders of China's Nurses Association and its first president, Caroline Maddock Hart, met in Kuling to form this association.

During the Long March, in early 1935, a battle took place in the area between the Chinese Red Army and nationalist forces, in which Hu Yaobang, later General Secretary of the Chinese Communist Party, was seriously injured.

Mount Lu was once dubbed the hsiatu (xiadu, "summer capital") of the Republic of China. Chiang Kai-shek, China's leader at the time, would frequently spend his summers in the area. In June 1937, Zhou Enlai, then a major leader in the Chinese Communist Party, met with Chiang on the mountain to discuss a united front against the Japanese invasion. In July 1937, Chiang Kai-shek announced his intention for a full mobilization for war against Japan from Mount Lu. In 1946, following the war, the U.S. special diplomatic mission led by General George C. Marshall met with Chiang Kai-shek to discuss the role of post-World War II China.

Mao Zedong convened three large conferences of senior party officials at Mount Lu, in 1959, 1961, and 1970. The 1959 conference became known as the Lushan Conference. The meeting saw the purge of decorated Chinese Civil War and Korean War general Peng Dehuai, who was critical of Mao's Great Leap Forward policies. The 1970 Lushan Conference took place during the Cultural Revolution, and marked the increasing antagonism between those loyal to Mao and those loyal to his chosen successor Lin Biao.

In 1980 the famous movie Romance on Lushan Mountain, which was entirely shot on Mount Lu, was released to the public and won considerable positive reception. It was considered as the most progressive film since the founding of communist China, because there was a kissing scene in the movie, which was seen as public taboo in the pre-reform and opening up China. It still holds the Guinness World Record for "the longest first run of a film in one cinema" for having been shown continuously since 1980 until today. Mount Lu has long been associated with religious institutions and literary culture; It appears in Chinese literary and artistic traditions as a site of retreat and contemplation.

== Attractions and features ==
Popular attractions on Mount Lu include the Immortal Caverns (仙人洞), Meilu Outhouse (美庐别墅), Five Old Man Peaks (五老峰), White Deer Cavern Academy (白鹿洞书院), Three Tiled Springs (三叠泉), Lulin Lake (芦林湖), Lushan Hot Springs (庐山温泉), Lushan Botanical Garden (植物园), Bamboo Temple (竹山寺), Guanyin Bridge (观音桥), Peach Blossom Garden (桃花源), and the Catholic Church of Mount Lu (庐山天主堂).

- The Lushan Botanical Garden features tens of thousands of plant species.
- Below the Five Old Men Peak is the White Deer Grotto Academy, named after the poet Li Bo (Chinese: 李渤) (not to be confused with the famous poet Li Bai), who raised white deer there. It is one of the most famous higher learning institutions in ancient China.
- West is the Flower Path which provided inspiration to Bai Juyi, a famous poet who lived during the Tang dynasty.
- Between the Yangtze River and Poyang Lake lie the Greater and Lesser Tianchi Lakes, the Jingxiu Valley, and Lulin Lake. On the north bank of the latter is the Mount Lu Museum, which features pottery and bronzes dating from various periods of ancient China, as well as calligraphy from the Tang dynasty and paintings from the Ming and Qing dynasties.
- At the centre (between three peaks), and at an altitude of over 1 kilometer above sea level, is the town of Kuling, which is linked by a mountain highway to neighboring spots in the region.
- World-famous 'Lushan clouds and mist tea' (simplified Chinese: 庐山云雾茶; traditional Chinese: 廬山云霧茶) is grown on the mountain.

== Gallery ==
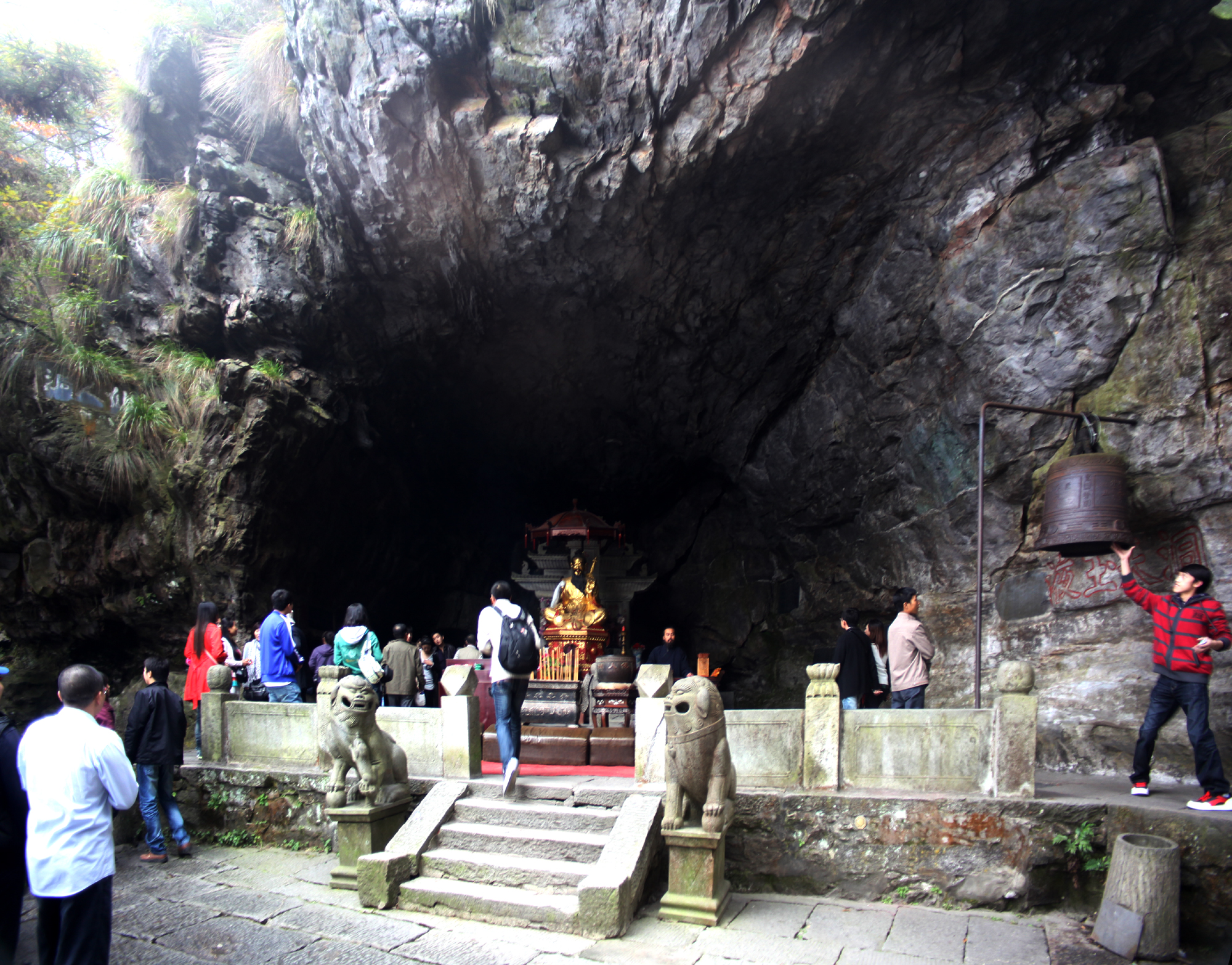
Mountain Immortals Cave

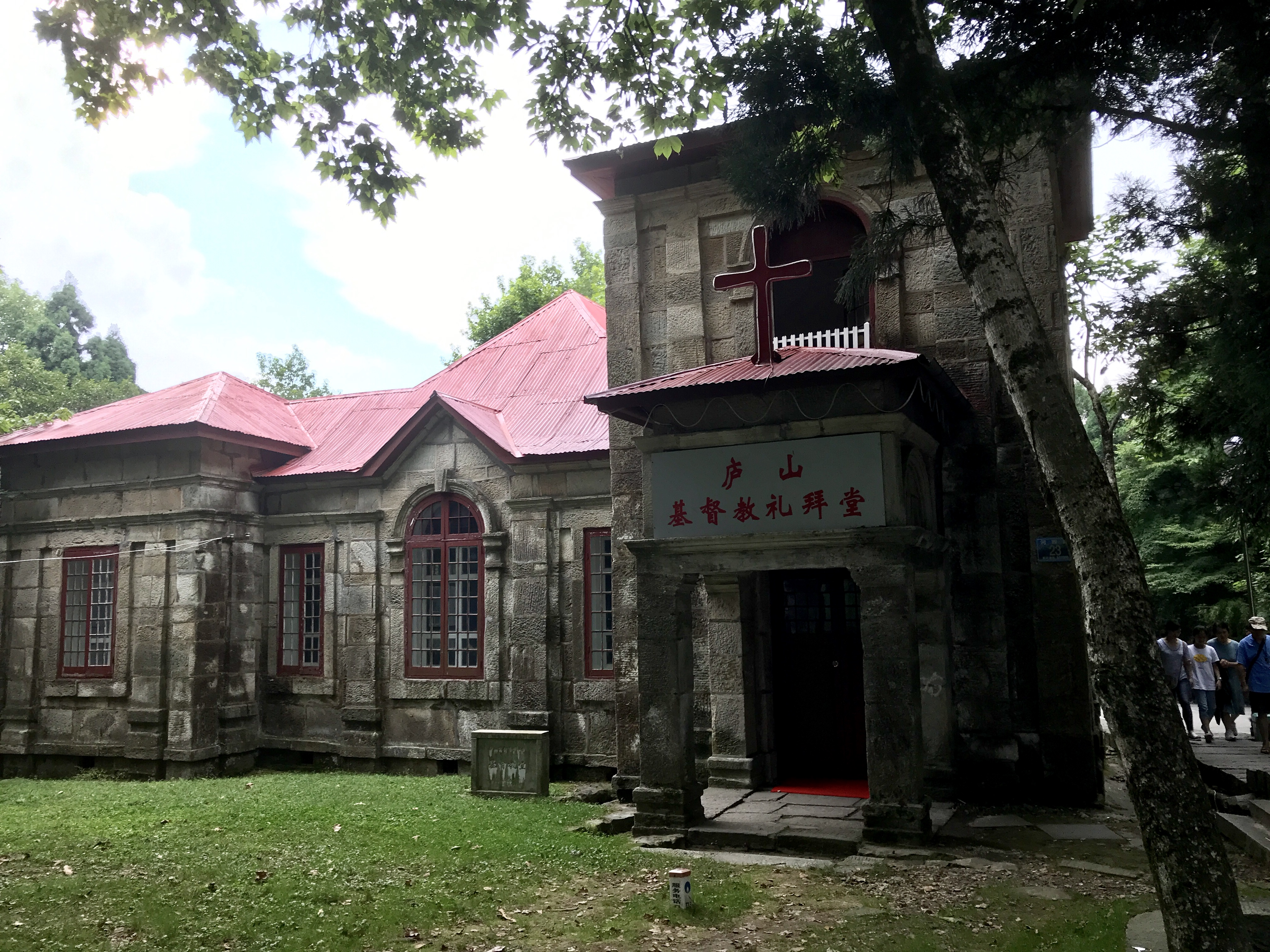
Christian church

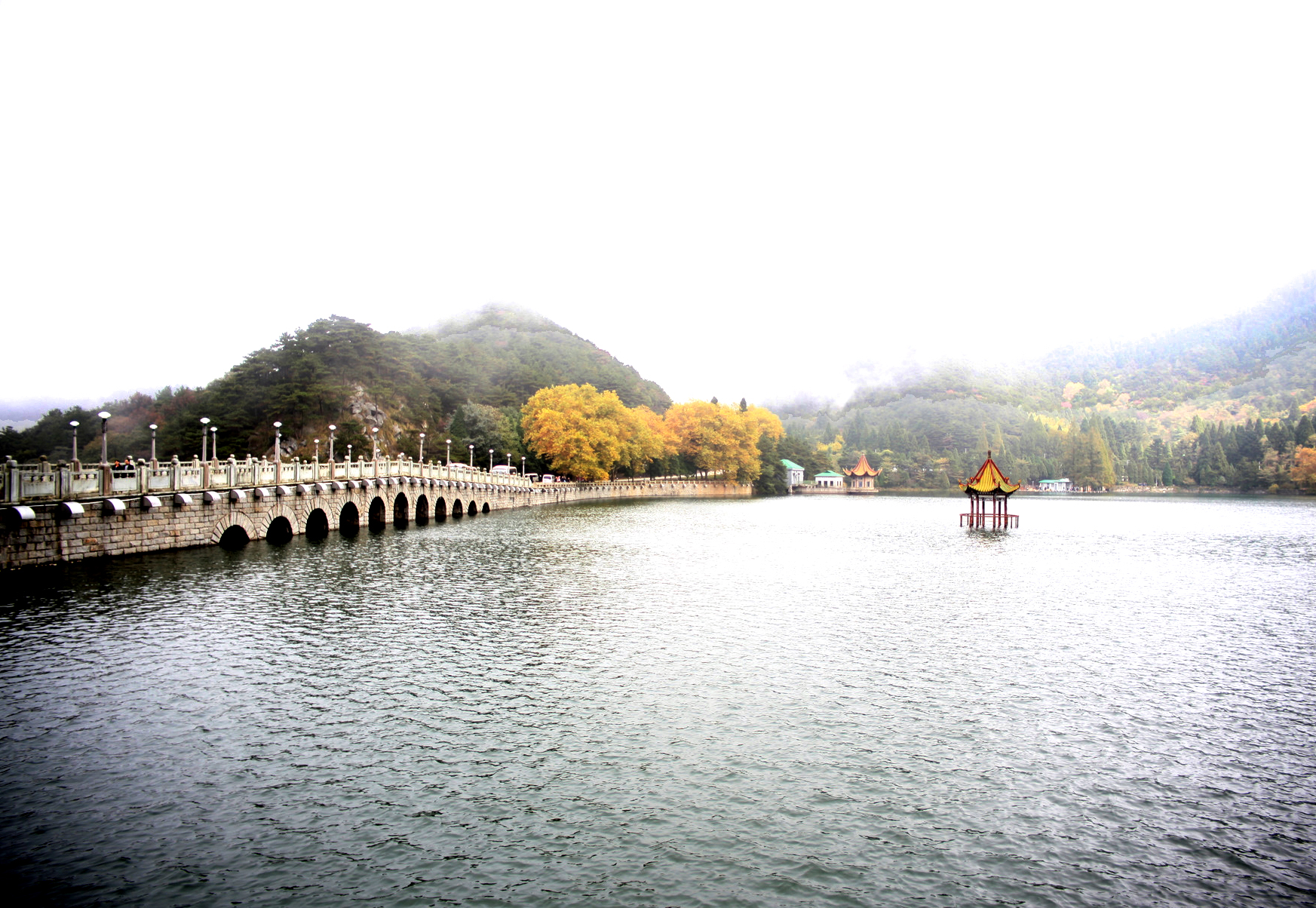
Lake Lulin

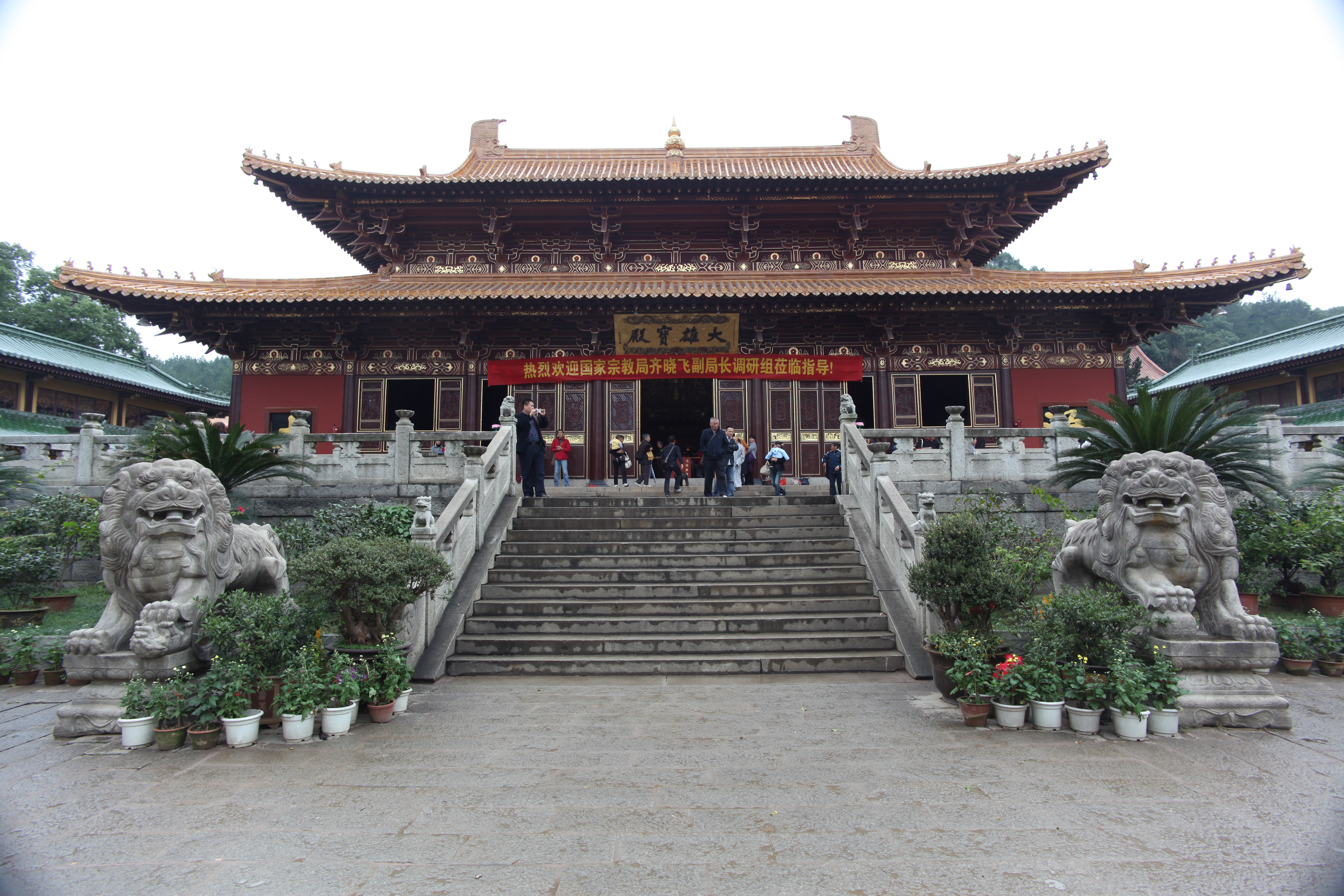
Donglin temple

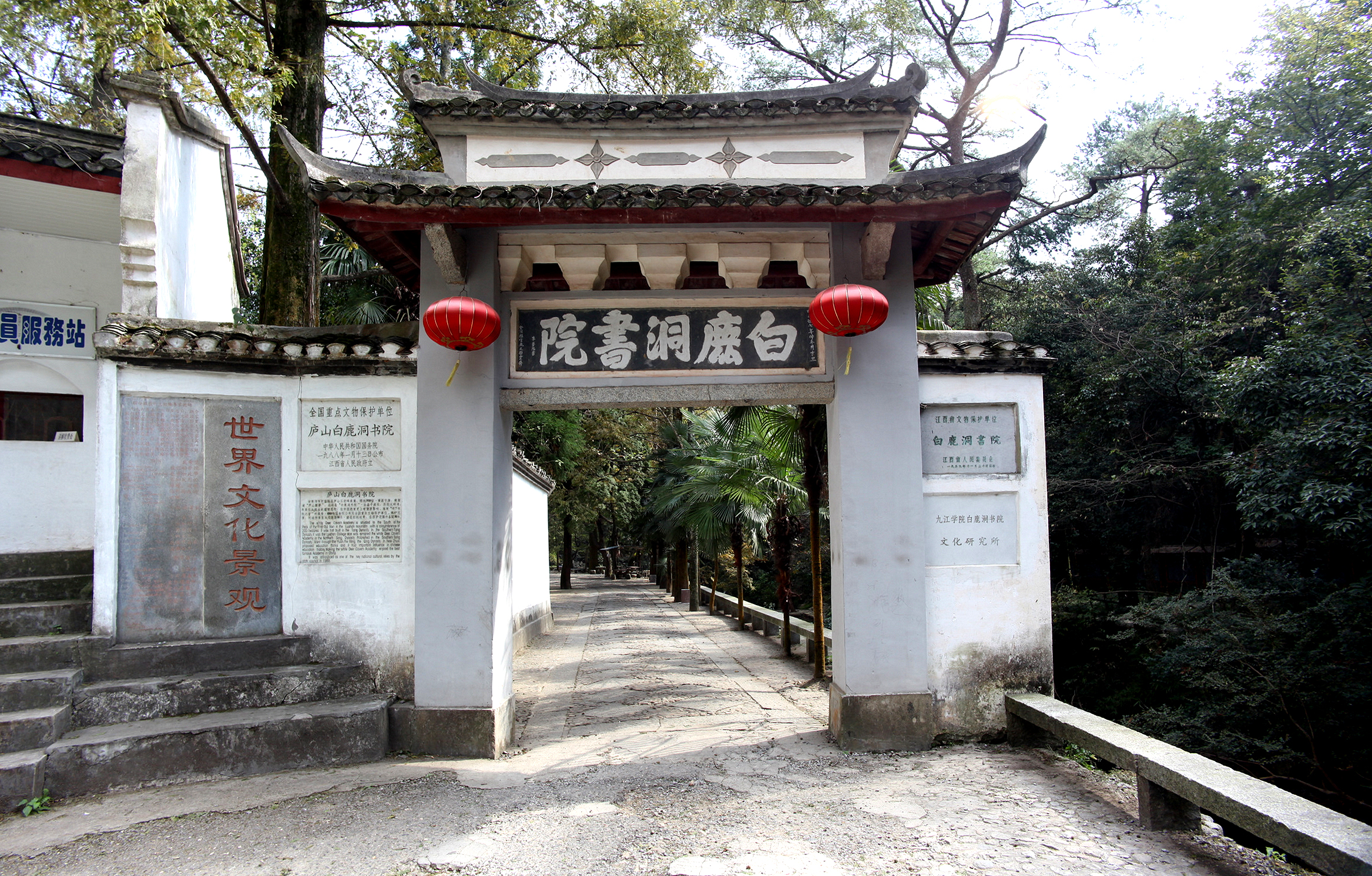
White Deer Grotte Academy

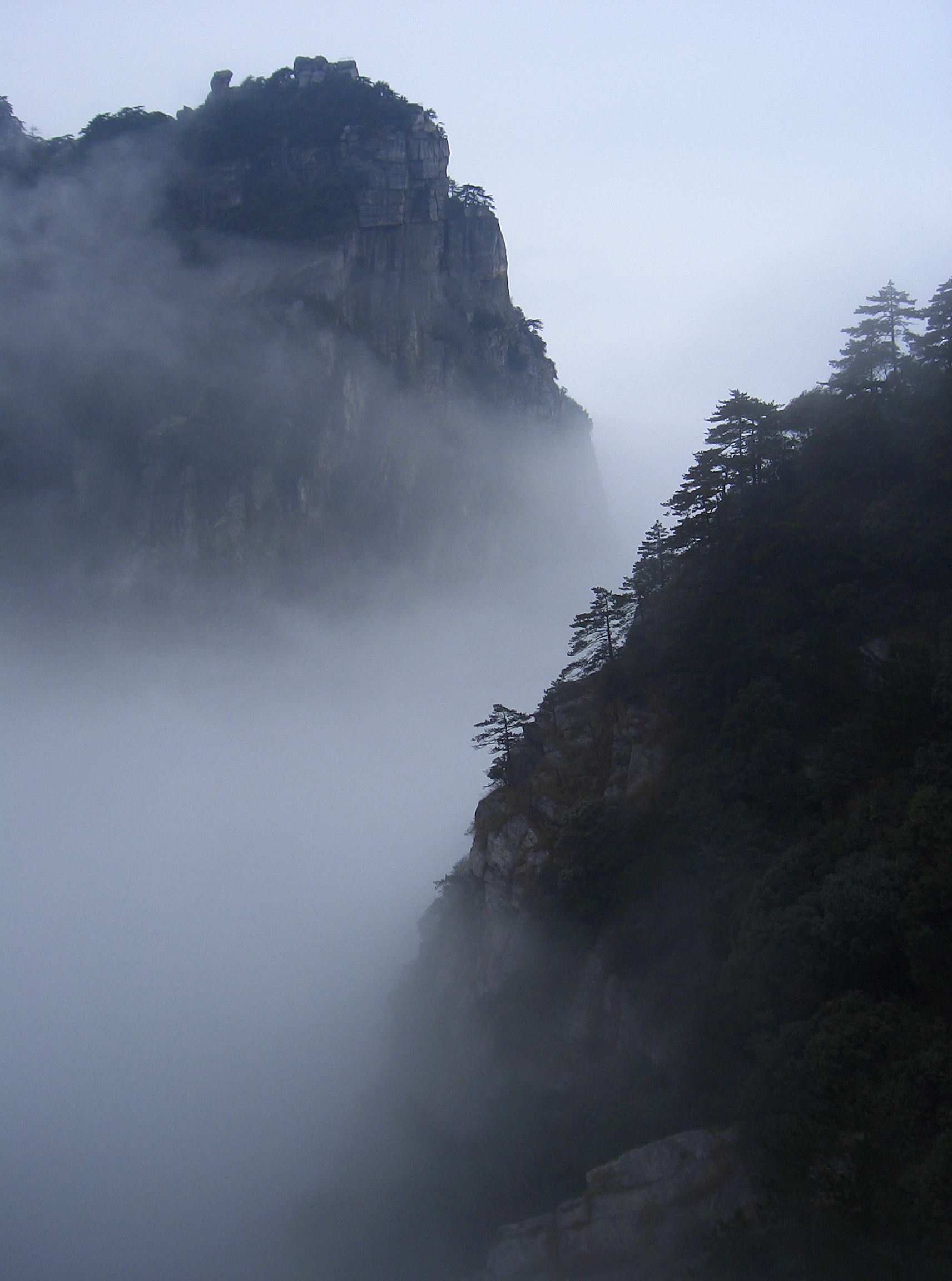
The small peaks of the mountain range can be climbed by visitors.

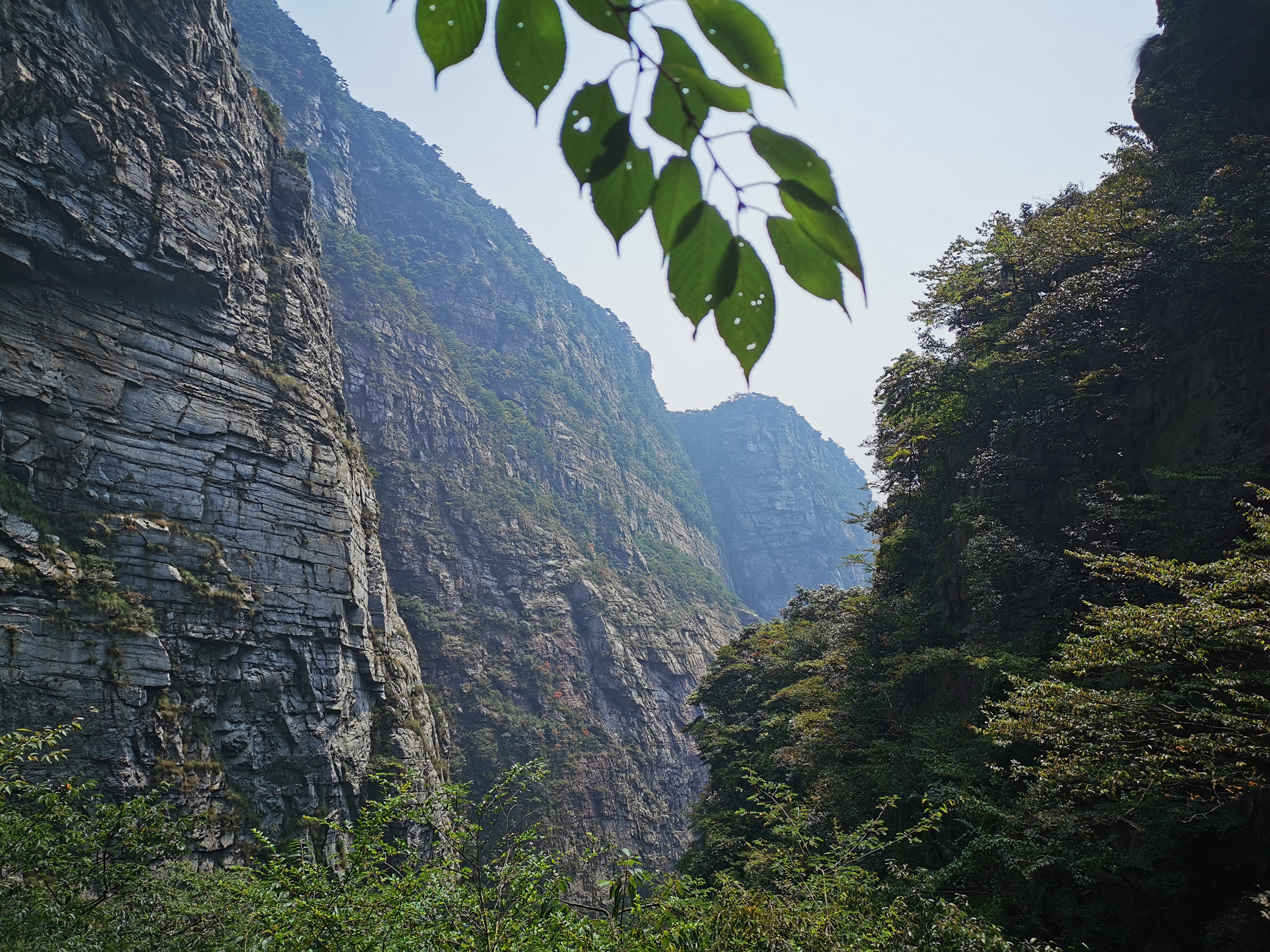
Mountain scenery near Sandie spring in Mount Lu scenic area

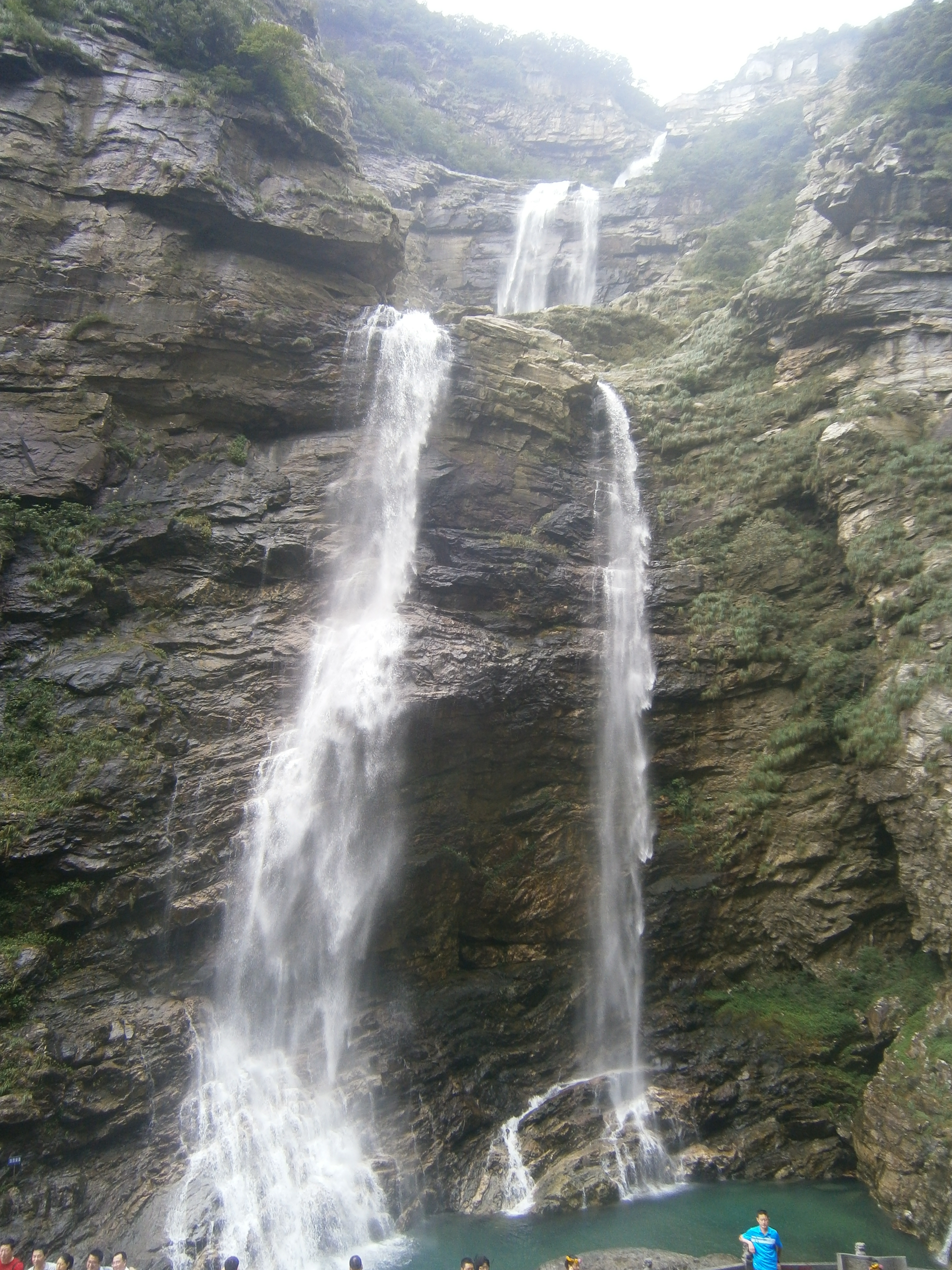

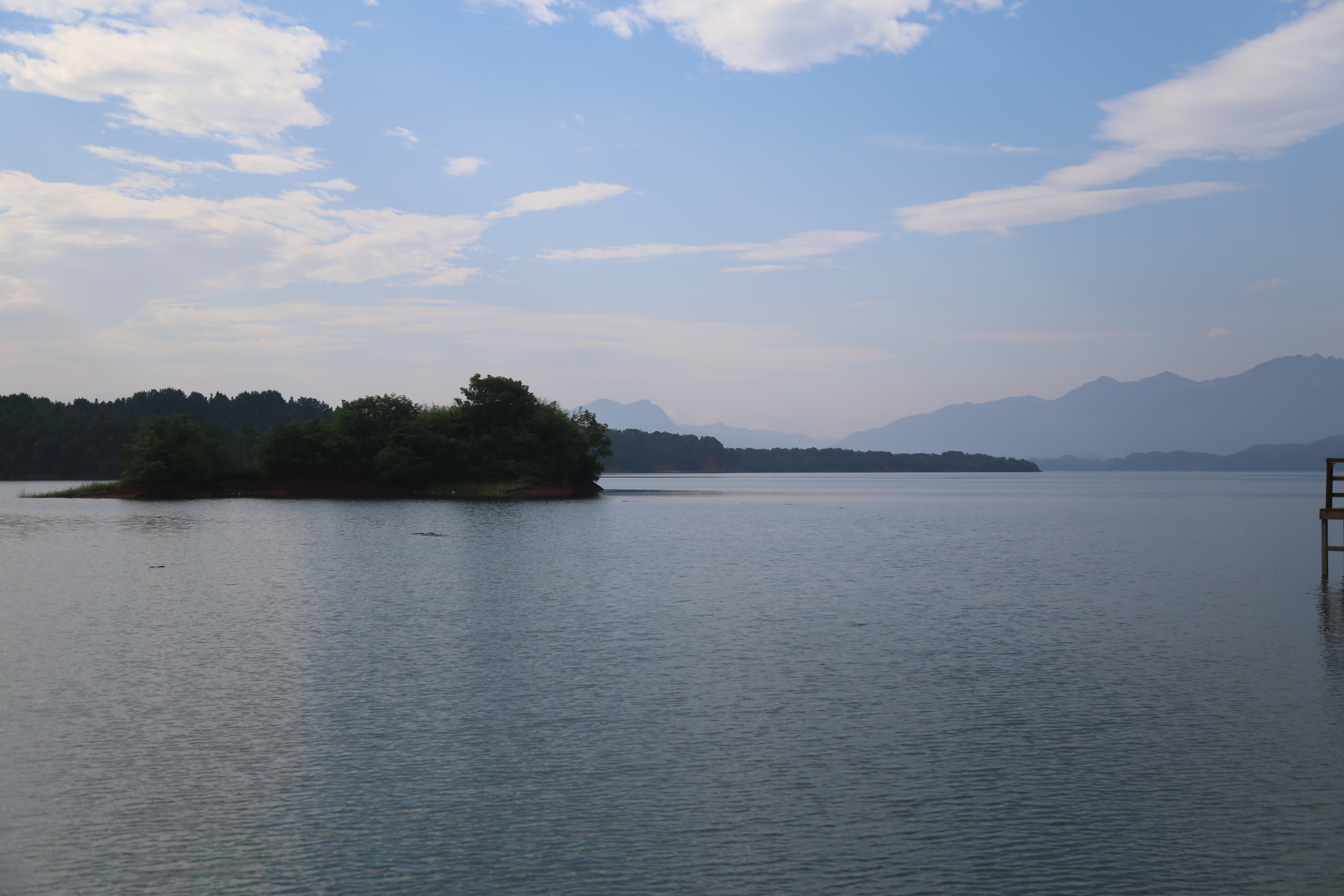
Mount Lu West Sea scenery

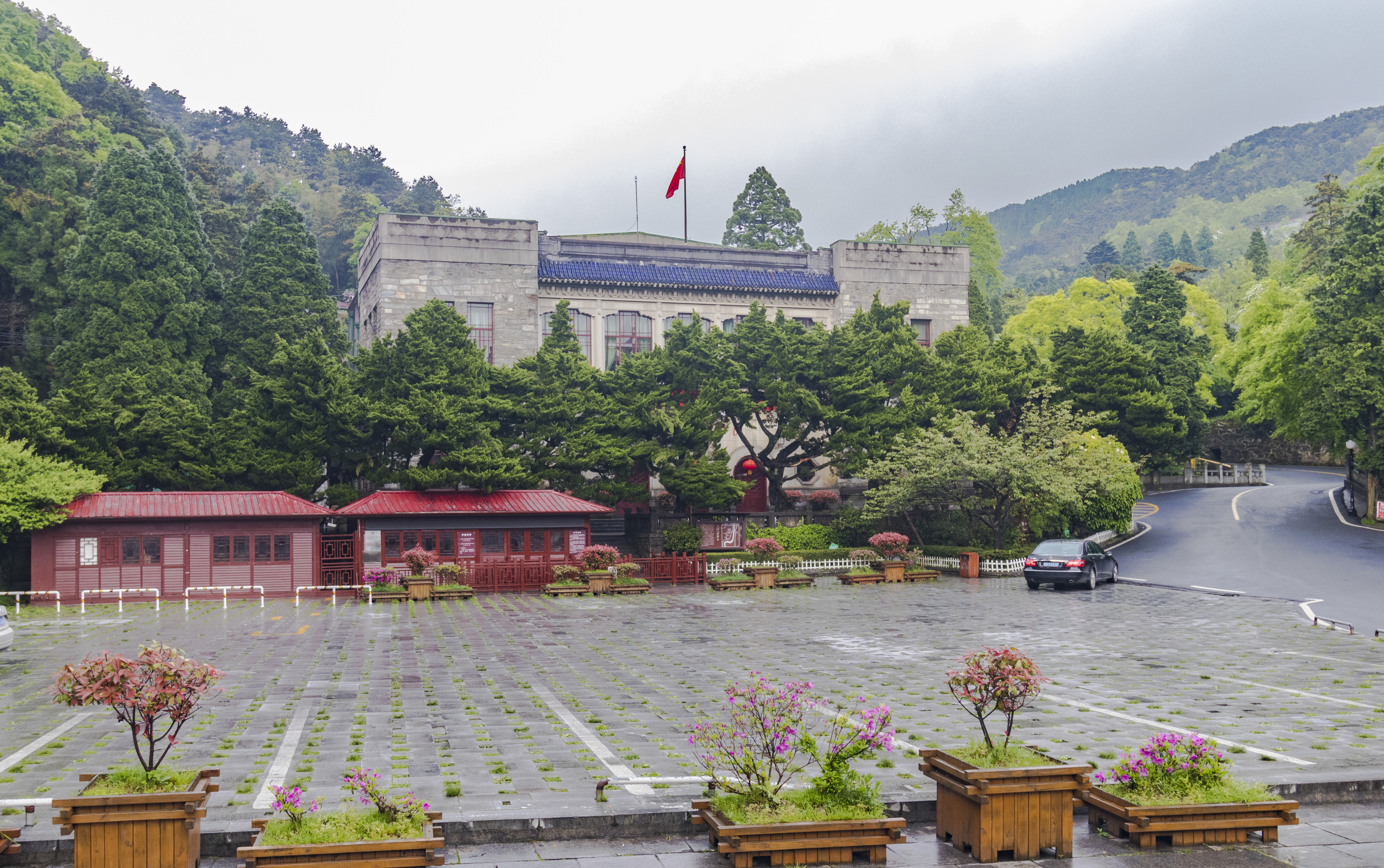
Site of the Lushan Conference, now a museum

== Climate ==
Climate data for Mount Lu (elevation 1,165 m (3,822 ft), (1991–2020 normals, extremes 1981–present)
Month	Jan	Feb	Mar	Apr	May	Jun	Jul	Aug	Sep	Oct	Nov	Dec	Year
Record high °C (°F)	19.4 (66.9)	20.5 (68.9)	27.7 (81.9)	26.4 (79.5)	28.1 (82.6)	29.3 (84.7)	31.8 (89.2)	31.9 (89.4)	30.2 (86.4)	28.5 (83.3)	25.1 (77.2)	18.9 (66.0)	31.9 (89.4)
Mean daily maximum °C (°F)	4.5 (40.1)	7.0 (44.6)	11.0 (51.8)	16.8 (62.2)	20.7 (69.3)	23.2 (73.8)	26.1 (79.0)	25.3 (77.5)	21.9 (71.4)	17.3 (63.1)	12.7 (54.9)	7.0 (44.6)	16.1 (61.0)
Daily mean °C (°F)	0.6 (33.1)	2.9 (37.2)	6.7 (44.1)	12.5 (54.5)	16.8 (62.2)	19.8 (67.6)	22.5 (72.5)	21.8 (71.2)	18.1 (64.6)	13.3 (55.9)	8.5 (47.3)	2.9 (37.2)	12.2 (54.0)
Mean daily minimum °C (°F)	−2.3 (27.9)	−0.1 (31.8)	3.5 (38.3)	9.1 (48.4)	13.7 (56.7)	17.3 (63.1)	20.3 (68.5)	19.5 (67.1)	15.7 (60.3)	10.5 (50.9)	5.5 (41.9)	−0.2 (31.6)	9.4 (48.9)
Record low °C (°F)	−13.6 (7.5)	−11.6 (11.1)	−10.4 (13.3)	−5.1 (22.8)	1.6 (34.9)	5.8 (42.4)	11.9 (53.4)	12.8 (55.0)	6.5 (43.7)	−2.4 (27.7)	−9.9 (14.2)	−16.7 (1.9)	−16.7 (1.9)
Average precipitation mm (inches)	85.3 (3.36)	98.5 (3.88)	167.9 (6.61)	202.2 (7.96)	251.2 (9.89)	306.1 (12.05)	274.2 (10.80)	290.3 (11.43)	147.8 (5.82)	97.4 (3.83)	83.0 (3.27)	61.7 (2.43)	2,065.6 (81.33)
Average precipitation days (≥ 0.1 mm)	14.3	13.7	17.0	16.7	16.2	17.4	13.5	15.3	10.8	10.4	11.7	11.2	168.2
Average snowy days	9.3	6.7	3.5	0.1	0	0	0	0	0	0	1.3	5.2	26.1
Average relative humidity (%)	73	76	77	77	79	85	85	87	84	75	69	65	78
Mean monthly sunshine hours	112.3	102.4	112.9	130.4	136.5	111.4	175.7	153.9	147.6	158.8	144.0	142.7	1,628.6
Percentage possible sunshine	35	32	30	34	32	27	41	38	40	45	45	45	37
Source: China Meteorological Administration all-time extreme temperature
