= Lushan City =

Lushan 庐山市
- County-level city
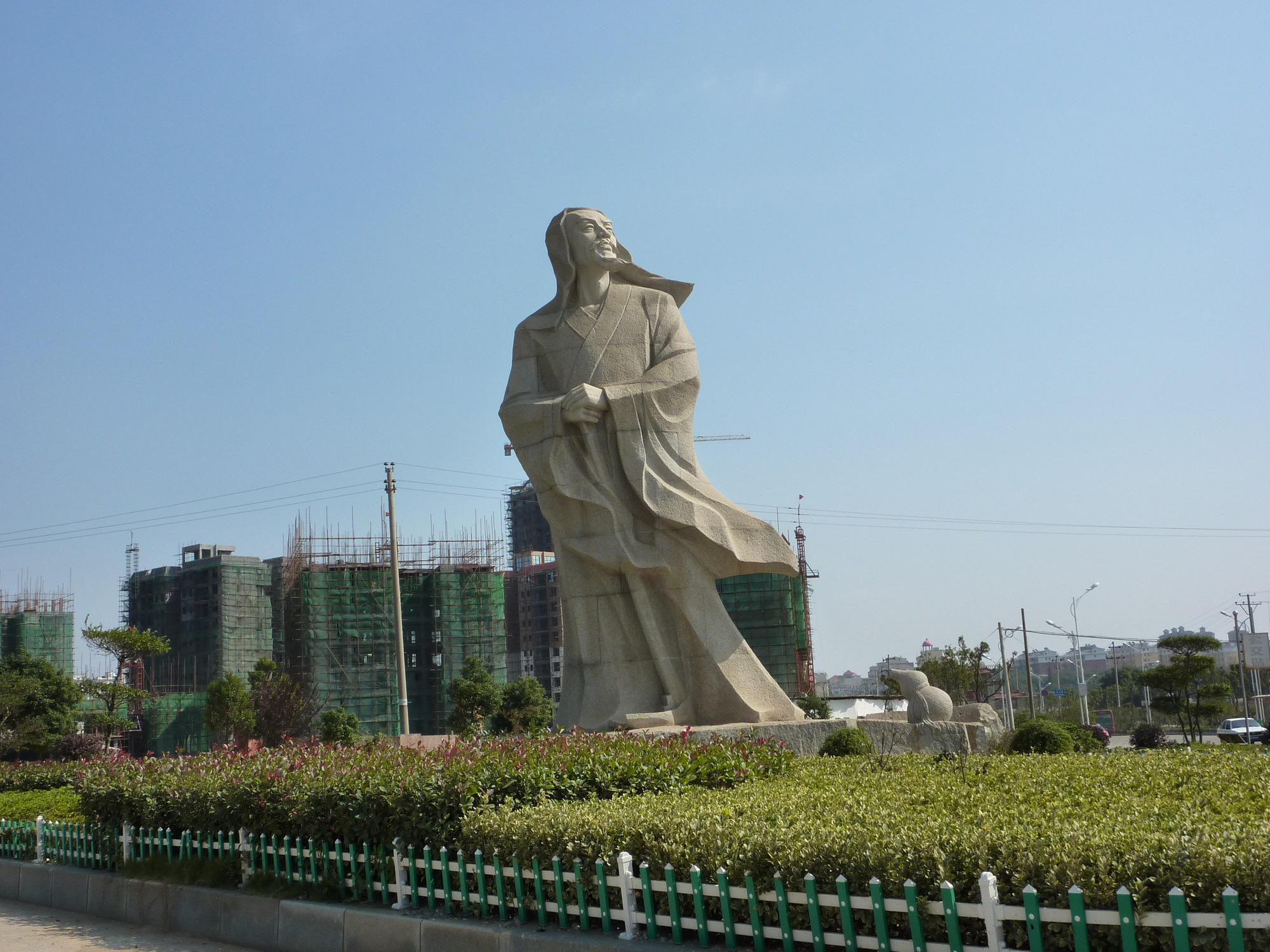

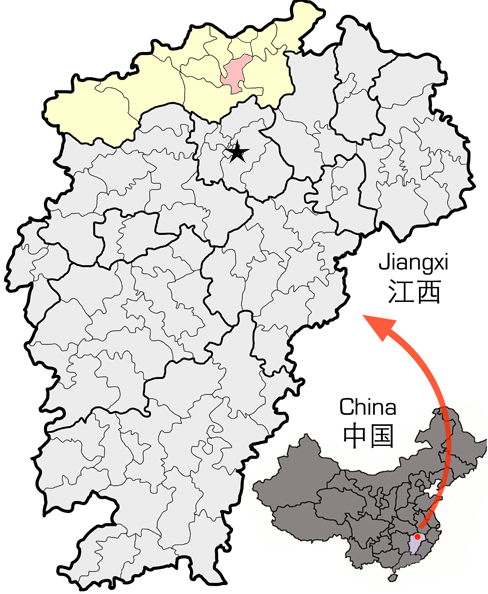
- Location of Lushan City (red) within Jiujiang City (yellow) and Jiangxi

- Location within China
- Coordinates: 29°26′53″N 116°02′42″E
- Country: People's Republic of China
- Province: Jiangxi
- Prefecture-level city: Jiujiang
- Seat: Nankang

Area
  - Total: 913 km^{2} (353 sq mi)

Population (2017)
  - Total: 244,755
  - Density: 268/km^{2} (694/sq mi)
- Time zone: UTC+8 (China Standard Time)
- Postal Code: 332800
- Towns: 7
- Township: 1

Lushan City (simplified Chinese: 庐山市; traditional Chinese: 廬山市; pinyin: Lúshān), formerly Xingzi County (Chinese: 星子县), is a county-level city in the north of Jiangxi Province, China. It is under the administration of the prefecture-level city of Jiujiang.

== Administrative divisions ==
Lushan City is divided to 9 towns and 1 township.

9 towns

- Nankang (南康镇)
- Bailu (白鹿镇)
- Wenquan (温泉镇)
- Xingzi (星子镇)
- Hualin (华林镇)
- Jiaotang (蛟塘镇)
- Hengtang (横塘镇)
- Guling (牯岭镇)
- Haihui (海会镇)

1 township

- Liaonan (蓼南乡)

== Climate ==
Climate data for Lushan City, elevation 37 m (121 ft), (1991–2020 normals, extremes 1981–present)
Month	Jan	Feb	Mar	Apr	May	Jun	Jul	Aug	Sep	Oct	Nov	Dec	Year
Record high °C (°F)	23.6 (74.5)	27.3 (81.1)	31.1 (88.0)	33.6 (92.5)	34.0 (93.2)	36.1 (97.0)	37.9 (100.2)	38.9 (102.0)	37.1 (98.8)	34.3 (93.7)	29.6 (85.3)	20.8 (69.4)	38.9 (102.0)
Mean daily maximum °C (°F)	8.6 (47.5)	11.5 (52.7)	15.6 (60.1)	21.7 (71.1)	26.3 (79.3)	28.9 (84.0)	32.3 (90.1)	32.4 (90.3)	29.0 (84.2)	23.9 (75.0)	17.5 (63.5)	11.3 (52.3)	21.6 (70.8)
Daily mean °C (°F)	5.3 (41.5)	7.8 (46.0)	11.7 (53.1)	17.7 (63.9)	22.7 (72.9)	25.8 (78.4)	29.1 (84.4)	28.9 (84.0)	25.2 (77.4)	19.9 (67.8)	13.5 (56.3)	7.5 (45.5)	17.9 (64.3)
Mean daily minimum °C (°F)	2.6 (36.7)	4.8 (40.6)	8.6 (47.5)	14.4 (57.9)	19.4 (66.9)	23.1 (73.6)	26.4 (79.5)	26.1 (79.0)	22.2 (72.0)	16.6 (61.9)	10.2 (50.4)	4.4 (39.9)	14.9 (58.8)
Record low °C (°F)	−5.9 (21.4)	−5.7 (21.7)	−2.2 (28.0)	3.1 (37.6)	9.2 (48.6)	14.7 (58.5)	19.2 (66.6)	18.6 (65.5)	14.6 (58.3)	4.6 (40.3)	−1.4 (29.5)	−9.5 (14.9)	−9.5 (14.9)
Average precipitation mm (inches)	67.2 (2.65)	83.2 (3.28)	145.3 (5.72)	183.8 (7.24)	210.6 (8.29)	250.5 (9.86)	202.8 (7.98)	139.5 (5.49)	69.5 (2.74)	51.2 (2.02)	63.8 (2.51)	41.7 (1.64)	1,509.1 (59.42)
Average precipitation days (≥ 0.1 mm)	12.4	12.2	15.4	15.0	14.6	15.7	11.3	10.5	6.9	6.7	9.4	8.9	139
Average snowy days	3.6	2.1	0.4	0	0	0	0	0	0	0	0.1	1.5	7.7
Average relative humidity (%)	73	73	75	75	75	80	78	76	71	67	70	70	74
Mean monthly sunshine hours	88.0	90.3	104.0	128.6	141.0	123.9	197.6	198.8	176.1	164.0	133.9	122.0	1,668.2
Percentage possible sunshine	37	27	29	28	33	33	30	46	49	48	47	42	38
Source: China Meteorological Administration

Climate data for Guling Town, Lushan, elevation 1,165 m (3,822 ft), (1991–2020 normals, extremes 1981–present)
Month	Jan	Feb	Mar	Apr	May	Jun	Jul	Aug	Sep	Oct	Nov	Dec	Year
Record high °C (°F)	19.4 (66.9)	20.5 (68.9)	24.6 (76.3)	26.4 (79.5)	28.1 (82.6)	29.3 (84.7)	31.8 (89.2)	31.8 (89.2)	31.6 (88.9)	28.5 (83.3)	25.1 (77.2)	18.9 (66.0)	31.8 (89.2)
Mean daily maximum °C (°F)	4.5 (40.1)	7.0 (44.6)	11.0 (51.8)	16.8 (62.2)	20.7 (69.3)	23.2 (73.8)	26.1 (79.0)	25.3 (77.5)	21.9 (71.4)	17.3 (63.1)	12.7 (54.9)	7.0 (44.6)	16.1 (61.0)
Daily mean °C (°F)	0.6 (33.1)	2.9 (37.2)	6.7 (44.1)	12.5 (54.5)	16.8 (62.2)	19.8 (67.6)	22.5 (72.5)	21.8 (71.2)	18.1 (64.6)	13.3 (55.9)	8.5 (47.3)	2.9 (37.2)	12.2 (54.0)
Mean daily minimum °C (°F)	−2.3 (27.9)	−0.1 (31.8)	3.5 (38.3)	9.1 (48.4)	13.7 (56.7)	17.3 (63.1)	20.3 (68.5)	19.5 (67.1)	15.7 (60.3)	10.5 (50.9)	5.5 (41.9)	−0.2 (31.6)	9.4 (48.9)
Record low °C (°F)	−13.6 (7.5)	−11.6 (11.1)	−10.4 (13.3)	−5.1 (22.8)	1.6 (34.9)	5.8 (42.4)	11.9 (53.4)	12.8 (55.0)	6.5 (43.7)	−2.4 (27.7)	−9.9 (14.2)	−16.7 (1.9)	−16.7 (1.9)
Average precipitation mm (inches)	85.3 (3.36)	98.5 (3.88)	167.9 (6.61)	202.2 (7.96)	251.2 (9.89)	306.1 (12.05)	274.2 (10.80)	290.3 (11.43)	147.8 (5.82)	97.4 (3.83)	83.0 (3.27)	61.7 (2.43)	2,065.6 (81.33)
Average precipitation days (≥ 0.1 mm)	14.3	13.7	17.0	16.7	16.2	17.4	13.5	15.3	10.8	10.4	11.7	11.2	168.2
Average snowy days	9.3	6.7	3.5	0.1	0	0	0	0	0	0	1.3	5.2	26.1
Average relative humidity (%)	73	76	77	77	79	85	85	87	84	75	69	65	78
Mean monthly sunshine hours	112.3	102.4	112.9	130.4	136.5	111.4	175.7	153.9	147.6	158.8	144.0	142.7	1,628.6
Percentage possible sunshine	35	32	30	34	32	27	41	38	40	45	45	45	37
Source: China Meteorological Administration
