= British Consulate General Jiujiang =

British Consulate General Jiujiang was established in 1861 located within British Concession of Jiujiang.

== Historical Background ==
=== Jiujiang Opened as a Treaty Port ===
After China's defeat in the Second Opium War, China and Britain signed the Treaty of Tientsin. At the beginning of the eleventh year of Xianfeng (1861), the British Counsellor, Harry Parkes, went to the new port on the Yangtse River by naval vessel according to the treaty to investigate the situation and select the site of concession to be opened. After the concession sites of Zhenjiang and Hankou were delimited on March 22, Harry Parkes returned to Jiujiang from Hankou and decided to open up a commercial port in Jiujiang.

== Consulate House ==
=== Lack of Consulate House in Jiujiang's British Concession ===
The Treasury in 1866 sent Major William Crossman, a surveyor in the Royal Engineers, to Shanghai with a wide-ranging brief that covered all of the consular establishments in the Far East. Crossman was surprised in 1866 at Kiukiang, where he had been told that there was no consular house, to find that a large house and constable's quarter had already been built on the bund in the concession area. It had apparently been funded by the unauthorised sale of a concession lot.

=== Built of Consulate House ===
It was not until 1892 when consulate house was built by Marshall in Jiujiang.
