= British concession of Jiujiang =

Foreign concession in China, 1861–1929

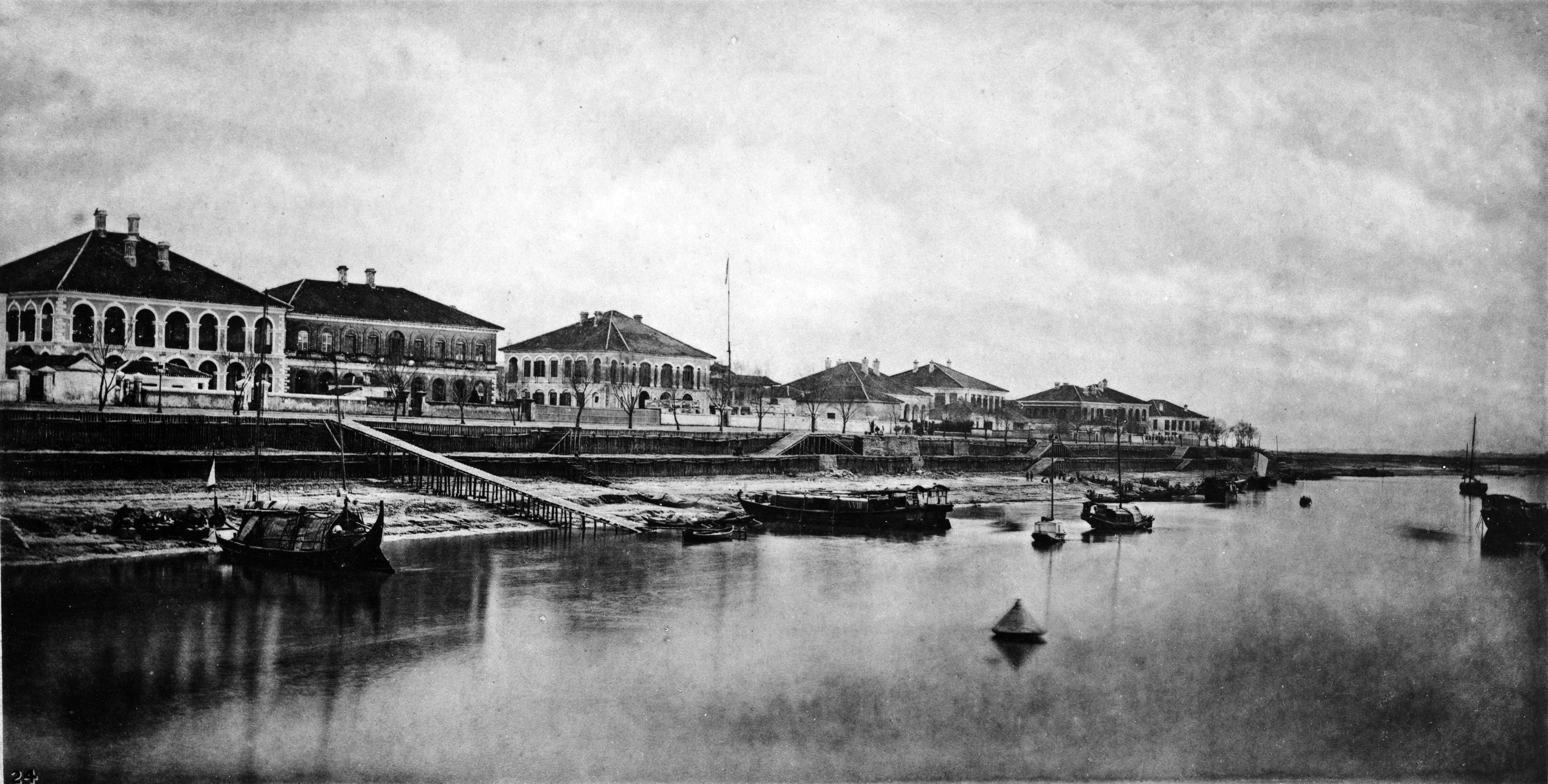
The British concession in Jiujiang c. 1873.

Location of the concession within China

The British concession of Jiujiang (Chinese: 九江英租界; pinyin: Jiǔjiāng Yīng zūjiè), formerly transliterated Kiukiang, was a foreign concession in the Chinese city of Jiujiang which was under the control of the British Empire. Established in 1861 in the aftermath of the Second Opium War as a result of the Treaty of Tientsin, the concession remained under British control until 1929, when it was ceded to the Republic of China under the terms of the Chen-O'Malley Agreement. The only one of its kind in Jiujiang, the concession became home to a sizeable community of European expatriates during its existence.

== Background ==
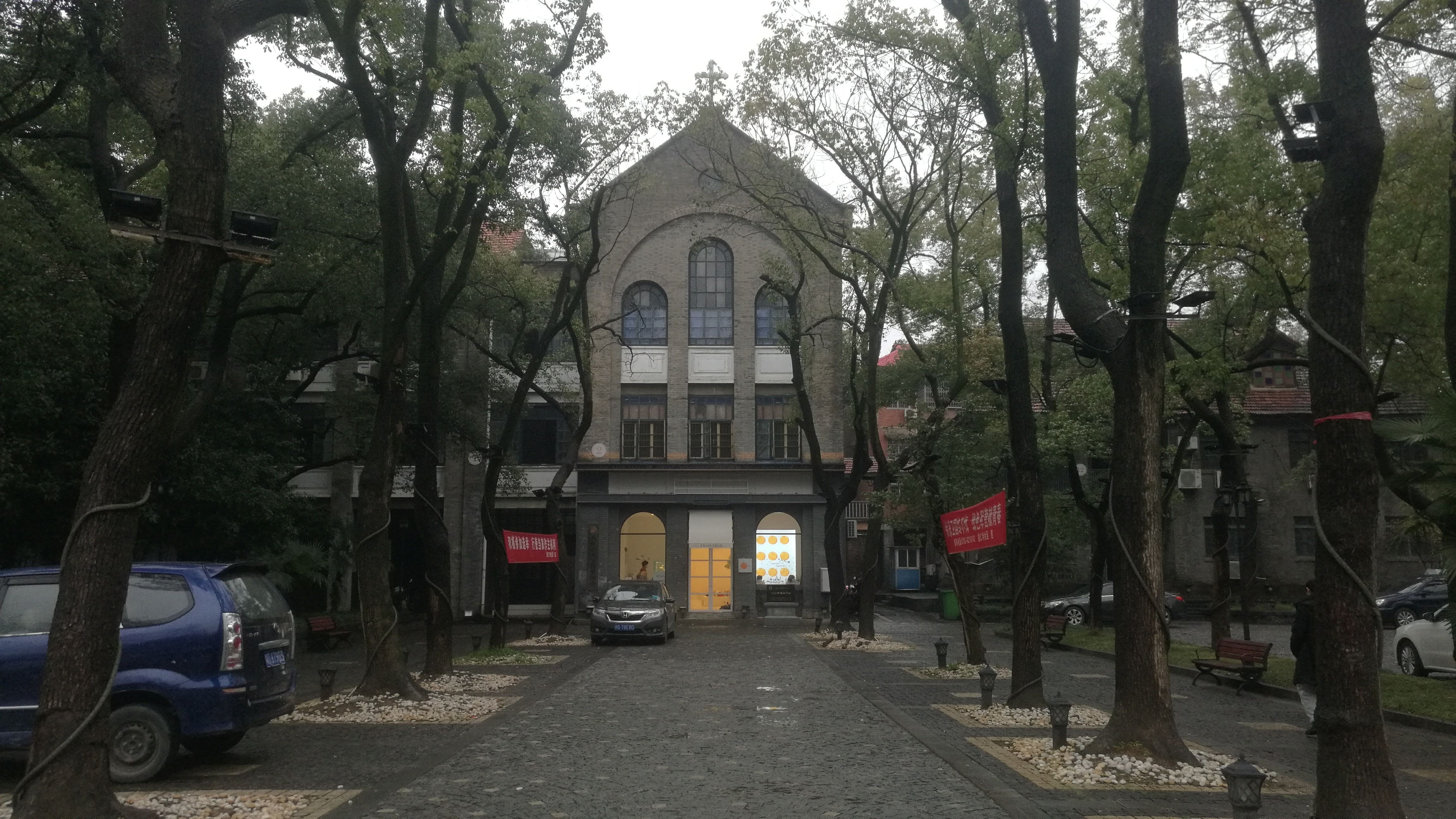
A Christian abbey built during the concession's existence

In 1860, the Second Opium War ended in a British victory, and the government of the Qing dynasty ratified the Treaty of Tientsin during the Convention of Peking, which granted the United Kingdom a foreign concession in a Chinese port city. Beginning in January 1861, British diplomat Harry Parkes travelled through the Yangtze river onboard a Royal Navy vessel to investigate local conditions and select the site of the new concession. After the foreign concessions in Zhenjiang and Hankou were delimited by 22 March, Parkes returned to Jiujiang from Hankou and decided to establish a concession in the city.

== History ==
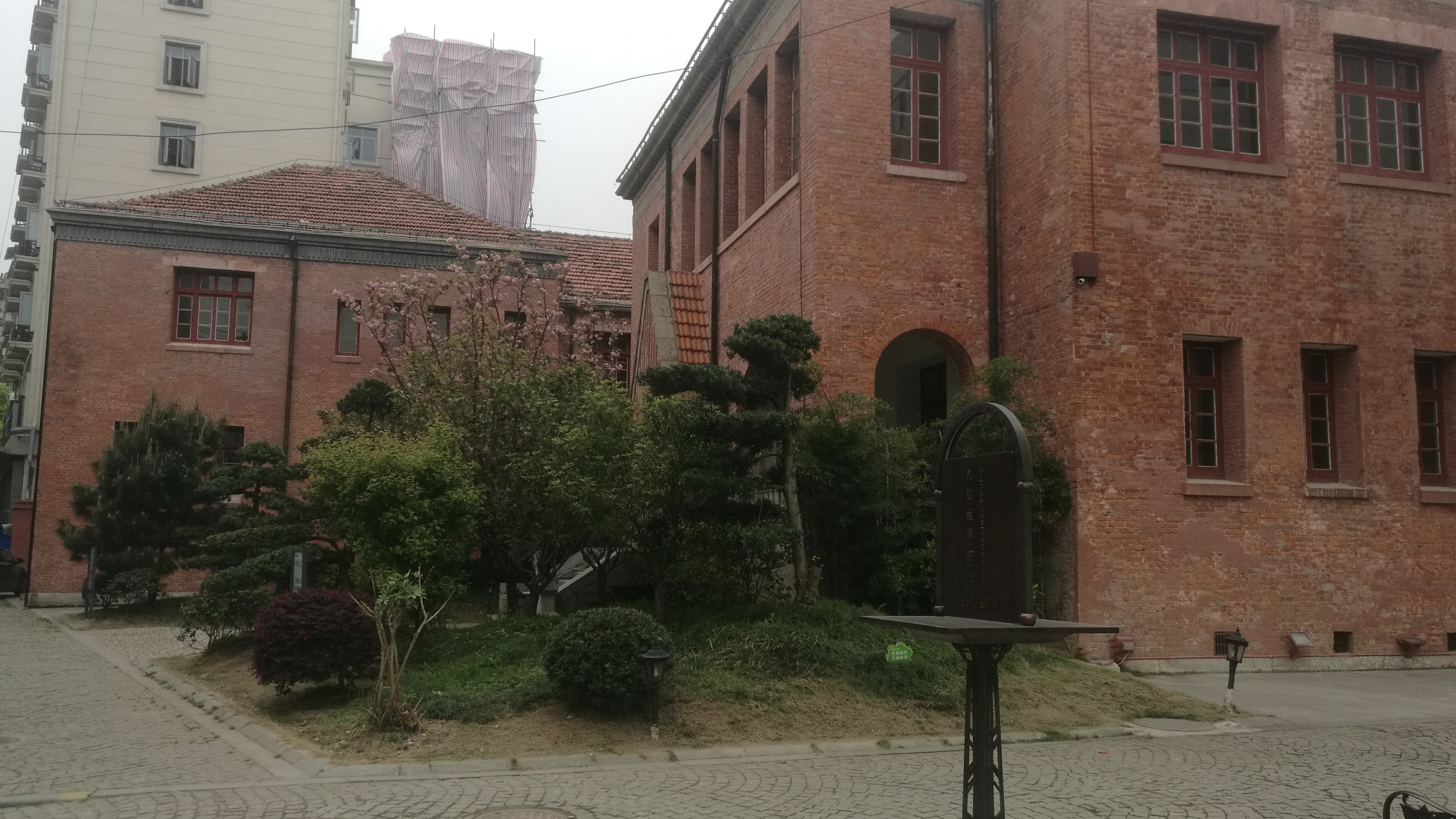
The former Japanese consulate in Jiujiang, which existed during the concession

In 1861, Qing official Zhang Jixin signed the Treaty of Land Lease in Jiujiang with Parkes, which officially established the concession. Its borders were located in a narrow area in the western part of Jiujiang between the Yangtze and Gantang Lake, and covered an area of 150 acres. The southern portion of the concession included a port on the Yangtze. On 27 March 1862, the British concessional authorities resurveyed the boundaries of the concession, which led to a minor confrontation with a group of local residents.

Over the course of 1891, the concessional authorities' Bureau of Industry reclaimed the outer parts of the port, using the reclaimed land to establish an urban park and race track. On 26 April 1909, a local merchant, Yu Facheng, died after an altercation with the concession's police inspector, John Mears. The concession's consular court subsequently acquitted Mears on a charge of manslaughter, despite Mears admitting during the trial that he had possibly given Yu a "poke"; the verdict led to a three-month boycott of British shipping in Jiujiang. In 1919, the concessional authorities' decision to levy taxes on all baggage and goods which transited through Jiujiang led to protests from local residents. On 13 June 1925, in support of the anti-imperialist May Thirtieth Movement, a crowd of local residents attacked the concession.

Encouraged by the occupation of the British concession in Hankou by the National Revolutionary Army (NRA) in October 1926 during the Northern Expedition, local residents in Jiujiang established the "Jiujiang Citizens' Diplomatic Action Committee to Britain" on 9 January 1927. On the afternoon of 13 January, members of the committee held an anti-British demonstration on a local drill ground, which was attended by more than 10,000 people. The concession in Jiujiang was subsequently occupied by NRA troops to prevent it from being looted by local residents. However, the British continued to retain de jure control over the concession until 1929, when under the terms of the Chen-O'Malley Agreement it was officially ceded to the Republic of China.

== Legacy ==
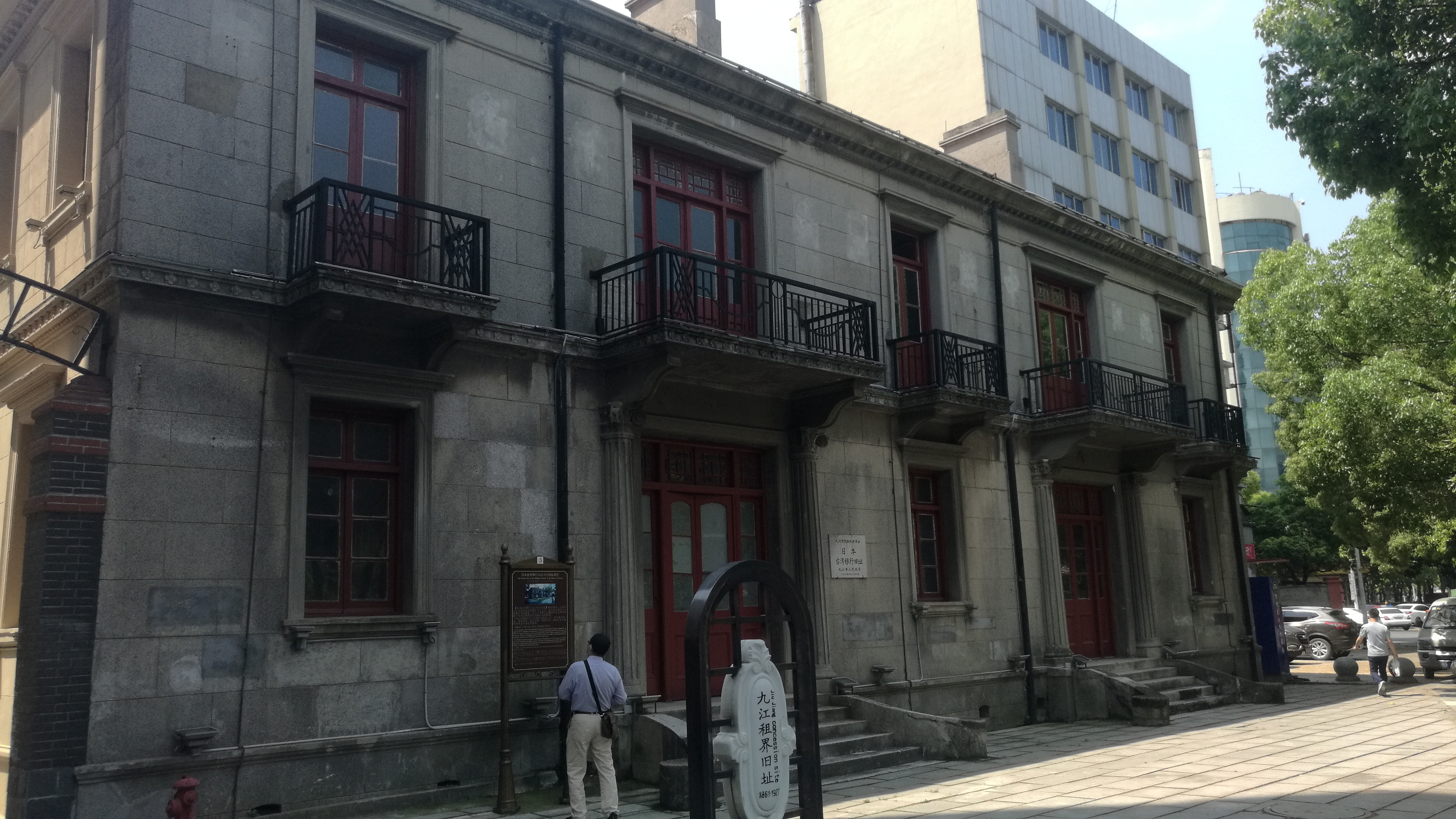
Former Taiwan Bank of Japan

In 2016, the Jiujiang people's government decided to repair four buildings left from the concession and transform them into a cultural and historical block, called Jiujiang 1858. The block is located on Binjiang Road. The four buildings are as follows:

- Former Taiwan Bank of Japan
- Former Japanese Consulate
- Former Japanese Consulate Residential Building
- Former Asiatic Petroleum Firm Residential Building

Of the four buildings, the former site of the Asiatic Petroleum Firm Residential Apartment was turned into British Concession Museum.

In 2018, then Hōfu mayor and president of the National Mayors Association of Japan (NMAJ), Masato Matsuura (松浦正人), led a delegation of NMAJ to visit the museum. Masato Matsuura said: I was born in the former Japanese consulate. Jiujiang is my second hometown. I am deeply attached to the beautiful landscape here.
